= Law Reform Act =

Stock short title used for legislation

Law Reform Act (with its variations) is a stock short title used for legislation in Australia, Malaysia, New Zealand and the United Kingdom relating to law reform. The Bill for an Act with this short title will have been known as a Law Reform Bill during its passage through Parliament.

Law Reform Acts may be a generic name either for legislation bearing that short title or for all legislation which relates to law reform.

== List ==
=== Australia ===
New South Wales

- The Law Reform (Miscellaneous Provisions) Act 1944

Western Australia

- The Law Reform (Property, Perpetuities and Succession) Act 1962

=== Malaysia ===
- The Law Reform (Eradication of Illicit Samsu) Act 1976
- The Law Reform (Marriage and Divorce) Act 1976

=== New Zealand ===
- The Law Reform Act 1936 (No 31)
- The Law Reform Act 1944 (No 18)
- The Law Reform (Testamentary Promises) Act 1949 (No 33)
- The Law Reform Amendment Act 1996 (No 130)
- The Insurance Law Reform Act 1977 (No 14)
- The Insurance Law Reform Act 1985 (No 117)
- The Company Law Reform (Transitional Provisions) Act 1994 (No 16)
- The Animals Law Reform Act 1989 (No 97)
- The Homosexual Law Reform Act 1986 (No 33)

=== United Kingdom ===
==== England and Wales ====
- The Law Reform (Miscellaneous Provisions) Act 1934 (24 & 25 Geo. 5. c. 41)
- The Law Reform (Married Women and Tortfeasors) Act 1935 (25 & 26 Geo. 5. c. 30)
- The Law Reform (Frustrated Contracts) Act 1943 (6 & 7 Geo. 6. c. 40)
- The Law Reform (Contributory Negligence) Act 1945 (8 & 9 Geo. 6. c. 28)
- The Law Reform (Personal Injuries) Act 1948 (11 & 12 Geo. 6. c. 41)
- The Law Reform (Miscellaneous Provisions) Act 1949 (12, 13 & 14 Geo. 6. c. 100)
- The Law Reform (Enforcement of Contracts) Act 1954 (2 & 3 Eliz. 2. c. 34)
- The Law Reform (Limitation of Actions, etc.) Act 1954 (2 & 3 Eliz. 2. c. 36)
- The Law Reform (Husband and Wife) Act 1962 (10 & 11 Eliz. 2. c 48)
- The Law Reform (Miscellaneous Provisions) Act 1970 (c. 33)
- The Law Reform (Miscellaneous Provisions) Act 1971 (c. 43)
- The Law Reform (Succession) Act 1995 (c. 41)
- The Law Reform (Year and a Day Rule) Act 1996 (c. 19)
- The Family Law Reform Act 1969 (c. 46)
- The Family Law Reform Act 1987 (c. 42)

==== Scotland ====
- The Law Reform (Miscellaneous Provisions) (Scotland) Act 1940 (3 & 4 Geo. 6. c. 42)
- The Law Reform (Miscellaneous Provisions) (Scotland) Act 1966 (c. 19)
- The Law Reform (Miscellaneous Provisions) (Scotland) Act 1968 (c. 70)
- The Law Reform (Miscellaneous Provisions) (Scotland) Act 1980 (c. 55)
- The Law Reform (Husband and Wife) (Scotland) Act 1984 (c. 15)
- The Law Reform (Miscellaneous Provisions) (Scotland) Act 1985 (c. 73)
- The Law Reform (Parent and Child) (Scotland) Act 1986 (c. 9)
- The Law Reform (Miscellaneous Provisions) (Scotland) Act 1990 (c. 40)

==== Northern Ireland ====
- The Law Reform (Miscellaneous Provisions) Act (Northern Ireland) 1937 (c. 9 (N.I.))
- The Law Reform (Miscellaneous Provisions) Act (Northern Ireland) 1948 (c. 23 (N.I.))
- The Law Reform (Husband and Wife) Act (Northern Ireland) 1964 (c. 23 (N.I.))

The following Orders in Council are considered to be primary legislation:

- The Family Law Reform (Northern Ireland) Order 1977 (SI 1977/1250 (N.I. 17))
- The Law Reform (Miscellaneous Provisions) (Northern Ireland) Order 2005 (SI 2005/1452 (N.I. 7))
- The Law Reform (Miscellaneous Provisions) (Northern Ireland) Order 2006 (SI 2006/1945 (N.I. 14))

== See also ==
- List of short titles
- Statute Law Revision Act
- Statute Law (Repeals) Act
