= Cox v Ergo Versicherung AG =

- Court: Supreme Court
- Full case name: Cox v Ergo Versicherung AG
- Decided: 2 April 2014
- Citations: [2014] 2 All ER 926 [2014] 1 AC 1379 [2014] RTR 20 [2014] 2 WLR 948 [2014] WLR(D) 150 [2014] 1 CLC 430 [2014] UKSC 22
- Transcript: BAILI

Case history
- Appealed from: [2012] EWCA Civ 1001 (Court of Appeal) [2011] EWHC 2806 (QB) (High Court)

Court membership
- Judges sitting: Lord Neuberger; Lord Mance; Lord Sumption; Lord Toulson; Lord Hodge

Keywords
- conflict of laws; personal injury; damages; road traffic accident; substance and procedure

Cox v Ergo Versicherung AG [2014] UKSC 22 is a judicial decision of the Supreme Court of the United Kingdom relating to the conflict of laws and the assessment of damages following a road traffic accident.

The primary issue for adjudication was to what extent rules relating to the calculation of damages were substantive (and so fell to be determined by German law, as the law of the place where the tort occurred) or procedural (and so fell to be determined by English law, as the law of the forum where the case was being determined).

== Facts ==
On 21 May 2004, Major Christopher Cox, an officer serving with the British Army in Germany, was riding his bicycle on the road when a car hit him, causing fatal injuries. The driver was a German national resident insured by a German insurance company, Ergo Versicherung AG. The governing law of the insurance policy was German law. The claim was brought by Major Cox's widow, Katerina. After the accident she returned to England and entered into a new relationship, and had two children with her new partner.

All parties accepted that liability of the driver of the car and his insurer were governed by German law. It was also common ground that under German law his widow had a direct right of action against the insurer for such loss as she would have been entitled to recover from the driver. She sued the insurers in England for bereavement and loss of dependency.

Liability was not disputed, but there was disagreement relating to the amount of damages. The key issues were (1) whether the damages fall to be determined by German law or English law, and (2) if English law, whether the provisions of the Fatal Accidents Act 1976 applied.

The issues of damages between Mrs Cox and the insurers was determined as a preliminary issue. Major Cox died before the Rome II Regulation came into force, and so the case was determined under the Private International Law (Miscellaneous Provisions) Act 1995.

== Judgment ==
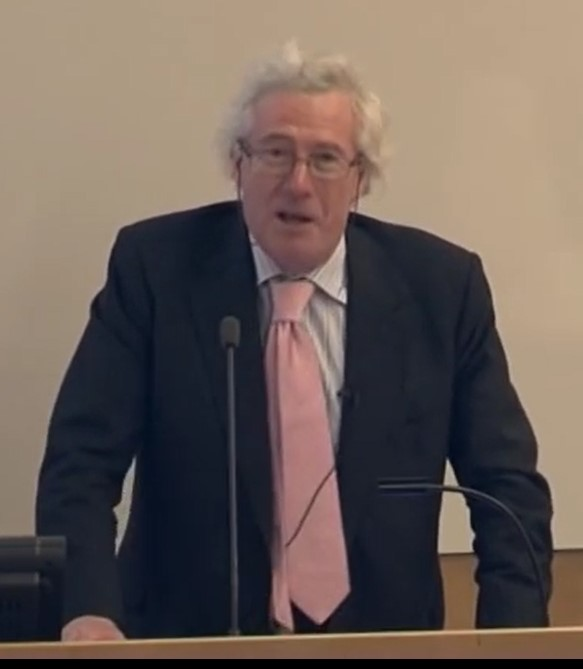
Lord Sumption.

=== Lord Sumption ===
Lord Sumption gave the lead judgment. Lord Sumption noted that English law and German law were broadly similar, but that under English law Mrs Cox would have the benefit of two additional claims over what she would have under German law:

1. Damages awarded to a widow under the German Bürgerliches Gesetzbuch (or "BGB") would take account of any legal right to maintenance by virtue of a subsequent remarriage or a subsequent non-marital relationship following the birth of a child (Mrs Cox had subsequently taken a new partner, and had children with them after returning to England). Section 3(3) of the Fatal Accidents Act expressly excludes remarriage or the prospect of remarriage as a relevant consideration in English law.
2. Section 844 of the BGB confers no right to a solatium for bereavement. Under section 823 of the BGB the widow may in principle be entitled to compensation for her own pain and suffering, but this would require proof of suffering going beyond normal grief and amounting to a psychological disturbance comparable to physical injury.

He then summarised the core issue thus:

English rules of private international law distinguish between questions of procedure, governed by the law of the forum, and questions of substance, governed by the lex causae. The issue in the present case is whether Mrs Cox is entitled to rely on the provisions of sections 3 and 4 of the Fatal Accidents Act 1976.

==== Appropriate choice of law rule ====
He then reviewed the leadings cases, including Harding v Wealands [2006] 2 AC 1 and Boys v Chaplin [1971] AC 356 and approved the test set out by Lord Hoffman in the earlier case to the effect that:

In applying this distinction to actions in tort, the courts have distinguished between the kind of damage which constitutes an actionable injury and the assessment of compensation (ie damages) for the injury which has been held to be actionable. The identification of actionable damage is an integral part of the rules which determine liability. As I have previously had occasion to say, it makes no sense simply to say that someone is liable in tort. He must be liable for something and the rules which determine what he is liable for are inseparable from the rules which determine the conduct which gives rise to liability. Thus the rules which exclude damage from the scope of liability on the grounds that it does not fall within the ambit of the liability rule or does not have the prescribed causal connection with the wrongful act, or which require that the damage should have been reasonably foreseeable, are all rules which determine whether there is liability for the damage in question. On the other hand, whether the claimant is awarded money damages (and if so, how much) or, for example, restitution in kind, is a question of remedy.

Applying the test he held that "I consider that the relevant German damages rules are substantive." He then turned to consider the applicability of the Fatal Accidents Act. He considered that the English rules were procedural. Accordingly, he found himself in the same difficulty as the Court of Appeal in how to square the different approaches of German and English law - if he applied the English common law rules (but without the Fatal Accidents Act) then Mrs Cox would have no claim at all under the old common law rules. He referred to the observations of Lord Parker CJ in Phrantzes v Argenti [1960] 2 QB 19 at 35, that in support of a foreign cause of action, the remedies afforded by English law "must harmonise with the right according to its nature and extent as fixed by the foreign law."

Ultimately he refused to be drawn into mental gymnastics and stepped back and held: "The English court must apply its own rules of assessment, then what rules are these, if not those of the Fatal Accidents Act? I do not think that it is necessary to resort to analogies, because English law does provide a remedy that harmonises with the German law right, namely damages." Accordingly, he cut across the procedural / substantive issue to use the English methods of quantifying the allowable German heads of loss.

He noted: "It is not at all satisfactory that such significant consequences should turn on difficult and technical considerations of the kind considered in the previous paragraph." He felt that the rational answer is that someone in Mrs Cox's position should recover in respect of a German cause of action what she would have recovered in a German court, and noted that although it did not affect this case, that this had now been achieved by changing the law under the Rome II Regulation.

==== Extra territorial effect ====
As a preliminary issue Lord Sumption had to consider whether "the Fatal Accidents Act 1976 should be applied notwithstanding the ordinary rules of private international law, for two reasons ... that as a matter of construction that Act had extraterritorial effect [or] ... that the principles enacted in Fatal Accidents Act represented "mandatory rules" of English law, applicable irrespective of ordinary rules of private international law."

He cited with approval the comments of Lord Scarman in Clark v Oceanic Contractors Inc [1983] 2 AC 130 at 145, that "unless the contrary is expressly enacted or so plainly implied that the courts must give effect to it, United Kingdom legislation is applicable only to British subjects or to foreigners who by coming to the United Kingdom, whether for a short or a long time, have made themselves subject to British jurisdiction". He noted that there was no express words within the Fatal Accidents Act 1976 to suggest that its provisions were intended to apply irrespective of the choice of law derived from ordinary principles of private international law. Accordingly any such intention would have to be implied. He noted that:

Implied extra-territorial effect is certainly possible, and there are a number of examples of it. But in most if not all cases, it will arise only if (i) the terms of the legislation cannot effectually be applied or its purpose cannot effectually be achieved unless it has extra-territorial effect; or (ii) the legislation gives effect to a policy so significant in the law of the forum that Parliament must be assumed to have intended that policy to apply to any one resorting to an English court regardless of the law that would otherwise apply.

He noted that the Act "is an unpromising candidate for implied extra-territorial effect". He rejected extra-territorial application for three main reasons: (1) at the time when the Act was passed, English choice of law rules in tort were subject to the "double actionability " rule. (2) The purpose of section 1 of the Fatal Accidents Act was to correct an anomaly in the English law of tort; there was nothing in the mischief of this legislation which requires it to be applied to provisions of foreign law which are presumably unlikely to exhibit the same anomaly. (3) There was no apparent reason whatsoever why Parliament should have intended the Fatal Accidents Act to apply to foreign fatal accidents with no connection to England. Neither the terms nor the purpose of the Act depend for their effect on its having extra-territorial effect.

Accordingly he held that the Fatal Accidents Act did not have extra-territorial effect.

=== Lord Mance ===
Lord Mance gave a brief concurring judgment expanding upon certain points and reserving others for further consideration in the future.

== Subsequent decisions ==
The decision has been cited with approval by the Supreme Court in Moreno v The Motor Insurers’ Bureau [2016] UKSC 52.

In relation to whether a statute has extra-territorial effect, the subsequent decision of the Court of Appeal in Roberts v SSAFA [2020] EWCA Civ 926 indicated that the decision of Lord Sumption Cox v Ergo is now the leading authority in this area.

== Sources ==
- Collins, Lawrence (2012). Dicey, Morris & Collins: The Conflict of Laws (15th ed.). Sweet & Maxwell. ISBN 978-0-414-02453-3.
- Hill, Jonathan (2016). Clarkson & Hill's Conflict of Laws (5th ed.). OUP. ISBN 978-0-19-873229-7.
- Torremans, Paul (2017). Cheshire, North & Fawcett: Private International Law (15th ed.). OUP. ISBN 978-0-19-967899-0.
