= J. H. C. Morris =

British legal scholar (1910–1984)

John Humphrey Carlile Morris QC DCL FBA (18 February 1910 – 29 September 1984) was a British legal scholar, best known for his contributions to the conflict of laws.

== Early life and education ==
John Morris was born in Wimbledon on 18 February 1910, to Humphrey William Morris and Jessie Muriel, daughter of Henry Vercoe, of Pendarves, Camborne, Cornwall. Humphrey Morris had become a successful London solicitor, following his father, Howard Carlile Morris, who was a partner in a firm he had co-founded. Howard Morris's mother, Sarah Anne Carlile, was of a Scottish family; cousins were the politician and businessman Sir Hildred Carlile, 1st Baronet, and his brother Wilson Carlile, founder of the Church Army.

Like his father, Morris was educated at Charterhouse School where he was elected to a Holford Scholarship to read history at Christ Church, Oxford, although after two terms he switched to study law. He graduated with first class honours degrees in the Final Honour School and subsequently on the BCL. He was elected to an Eldon Law Scholarship, but was unsuccessful in his quest for the Vinerian Scholarship.

In 1934 he was called to the Bar by Gray's Inn, but he did not enjoy legal practice. In 1936 he left to return to Oxford at a tutor in law at Magdalen College, Oxford where (with the exception of one year as a visiting fellow at Harvard) he would spend the remainder of his professional life. During his brief career at the Bar, he did appear on one occasion before the House of Lords in Government of India v Taylor [1955] AC 491.

In 1939 he married (Mercy) Jane, daughter of civil servant Stanley Asher Kinch. They never had children.

== War service ==
At the outbreak of World War II Morris was too old to enlist, so instead joined the Royal Navy Volunteer Reserve. He was posted initially to the Faroe Islands to defend against possible attack, and was later involved in allied training operations preparing for D-Day.

== Academic contributions ==
After arriving at Magdalen, Morris was credited with transforming the teaching of law at the college, including the recruitment of key academics such as Rupert Cross. Two students who claimed to have been particularly influenced by him were Lord Browne-Wilkinson and Ronald Dworkin. Unusually, he never held a chair at Oxford. He was reportedly offered the post of Vinerian Professor of English Law in 1954, but declined in favour of his colleague, Rupert Cross.

He is most famous for his contributions to private international law. Whilst at Harvard he published a notable article in Harvard Law Review on the subject, and he taught the subject for decades to BCL students at Oxford. But he is most famous as general editor of what is now as Dicey Morris & Collins on the Conflict of Laws. However he also published the 9th edition of Theobald on Wills and Cases on Private International Law, and wrote extensively on property law.

Morris was a longstanding critic of the double actionability rule in tort, but did not live long enough to see the rule relaxed by the Privy Council in Red Sea Insurance Co Ltd v Bouygues SA [1995] 1 AC 190.

Upon his retirement Morris was honoured with a book published in dedication to him: Contemporary Problems in the Conflict of Law: Essays in Honour of John Humphrey Carlile Morris. The foreword was written by Lord Scarman, who expressed himself as indebted to Morris for his guidance during his (Scarman's) time as Chairman of the Law Commission.

Outside of his academic and legal career, Morris wrote Thank You, Wodehouse in 1981, a book of essays about the work of comic novelist P. G. Wodehouse, of whom Morris was a devoted fan.
