= Soldiers, Sailors, Airmen and Families Association v Allgemeines Krankenhaus Viersen GmbH =

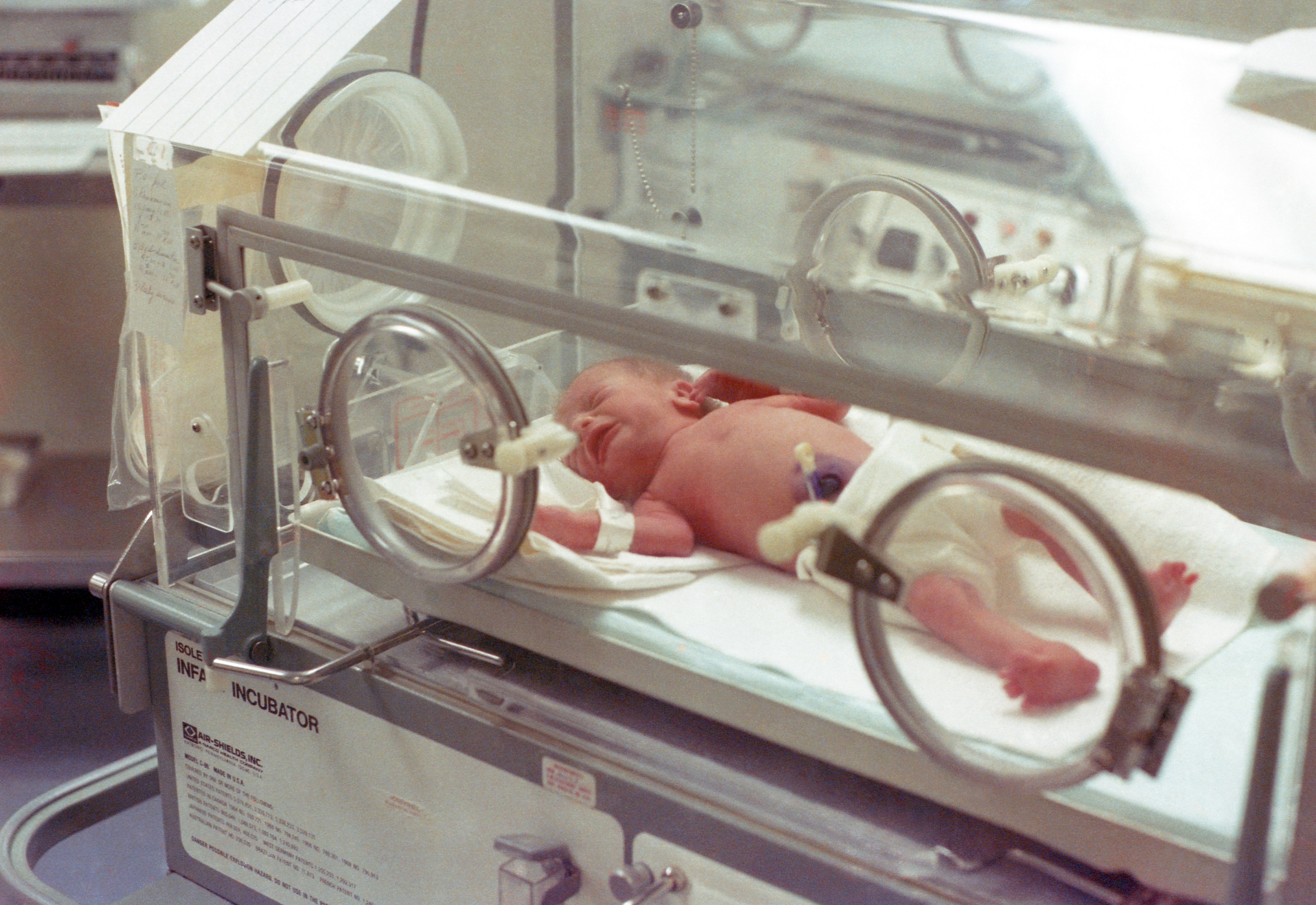
- A neonatal intensive care unit
- Court: Supreme Court of the United Kingdom
- Full case name: Harry Roberts (a minor and a protected party by his mother and litigation friend Mrs Lauren Roberts) v (1) Soldiers, Sailors, Airmen and Families Association, (2) Ministry of Defence, and (3) Allegemeines Krankenhaus Viersen GMBH
- Decided: 2 November 2022
- Citations: [2022] UKSC 29 [2022] 3 WLR 1111 [2023] 1 All ER 1 [2023] PIQR P7 [2023] PNLR 6
- Transcript: BAILII

Case history
- Appealed from: [2020] EWCA Civ 926 [2019] EWHC 1104 (QB)

Case opinions
- Decision by: Lord Reed; Lord Hodge; Lord Kitchin; Lord Hughes; Lord Lloyd-Jones

Keywords
- personal injury; neonatal claims; negligence; contribution; choice of law

Soldiers, Sailors, Airmen and Families Association v Allgemeines Krankenhaus Viersen GmbH [2022] UKSC 29, [2022] 3 WLR 1111 is a judicial decision of the Supreme Court of the United Kingdom in relation to the proper law to govern contribution claims in cross-border torts.

Harry Roberts, was born in Germany and alleged that he had been injured as a result of the alleged negligence of the Soldiers, Sailors, Airmen and Families Association (the "SSAFA") at the time of his birth. Through his mother he brought legal proceedings against the SSAFA and the Ministry of Defence in the United Kingdom. The SSAFA and the Ministry of Defence then served third party contribution notices on the German hospital, alleging that if there was fault in the birth of Harry Roberts, the hospital was partially responsible.

All parties agreed that any tort which had occurred would be governed by German law. The German hospital argued that any right of third party contribution against it was barred because under German law the relevant limitation period had expired. However the SSAFA and the Ministry of Defence argued that the right of contribution was governed not by German law but by English law instead, where the limitation period had not yet expired. Although Harry Roberts was the claimant in the action, the main dispute before the Supreme Court was between the other parties to determine whether the German hospital could be required to contribute to the payment of any damages.

The Supreme Court unanimously ruled that the contribution claim was to be determined by German law, and so the relevant limitation period had expired. Accordingly the German hospital had a defence under the German limitation period against any claim for a contribution by the defendants.

== Facts ==
Harry Roberts was born on 14 June 2000 in the Allegemeines Krankenhaus in Viersen, North Rhine-Westphalia, Germany which was a hospital providing medical services to families and members of UK Armed Forces in which his father was a serving member. The plaintiffs claimed that Harry suffered an acute profound hypoxic brain injury. His injuries were severe. He had level 5 cerebral palsy and had no independent mobility, making him reliant on a wheelchair.

He brought legal proceedings in England through his mother as litigation friend (even though he was over 18 at the time the claim was brought, his mental condition resulted in him being a protected party under the English civil procedure rules). He alleged that the negligent failings of the midwife who attended his mother's labour in the latter stages and who was employed by the SSAFA, caused his injuries. SSAFA disputed liability, but they in turn issued third party proceedings against the German hospital so that in the event they were found to be liable to Harry Roberts, that the hospital should make a contribution to the damages under Part 20 of the Civil Procedure Rules. The German hospital disputed liability as well, and further argued that as against them the limitation period had expired under German law.

Under the Private International Law (Miscellaneous Provisions) Act 1995 (which applied at the time), any alleged tort was governed by German law. However, in the English courts any right of contribution was governed by the Civil Liability (Contribution) Act 1978, and it was argued that the 1978 Act had overriding effect and therefore mandated English law to govern the contribution claims even though German law governed the underlying tort claims, and thus the expiry of the limitation period under German law would be irrelevant. Accordingly, as a preliminary issue, it had to be determined which law should govern the contribution claim. The preliminary issue was agreed by the parties, and certified by Master Yoxall in following terms:

... the relevant question for the purposes of the trial of the preliminary issue is whether or not the 1978 Act has mandatory or overriding effect and applies automatically to all proceedings for contribution brought in England and Wales, without reference to any choice of law rules. If not, German law will apply to the Defendants' claims for contribution against the Part 20 Defendant and they will be time-barred.

== High Court ==
In the High Court the preliminary issue came before Mr Justice Soole, who ruled that the Civil Liability (Contribution) Act 1978 mandated the application of English law to the contribution claims, and thus the proceedings against the German hospital could continue in England even though they were statute barred in Germany.

== Court of Appeal ==
=== Lead judgment ===
In the Court of Appeal the lead judgment was given by Lord Justice Irwin. He began by summarising the facts and then discussing the background to the 1978 Act. He then considered the various authorities relating to the Act and the issue of the proper law to govern contribution claims. He noted that the editors of Dicey Morris & Collins (12th edition) expressed the view that the proper law of the claim would govern the contribution claim as well.

He also reviewed the only decision on the point - the first instance decision of Chadwick J in Arab Monetary Fund v Hashim (The Times, 11 October 1994). In that decision Chadwick J had held that the effect of the Civil Liability (Contribution) Act 1978 was to apply English law to all contribution claims, irrespective of the law which governed the underlying liability.

He noted that the decision in Hashim had been subject to a great deal of academic criticism, including most notably by Professor Adrian Briggs writing in the Lloyd's Commercial and Maritime Law Quarterly. who attacked the decision stating: "The blanket application of English law to the substance of the contribution claim is inappropriate", and criticising the inevitable "anarchy of separated parts of a single story". Irwin LJ also noted that other academic commentators had also been critical, including Professor Robert Stevens and Dr Charles Mitchell.

He further noted that the Law Commission of England and Wales had, prior to the decision in Hashim, expressed the view that contribution claims should also be governed by the proper law of the underlying claim.

He then turned to the interpretation of the Civil Liability (Contribution) Act 1978 itself. He noted that there was a presumption that statutes were not intended to have extra-territorial effect (Clark (Inspector of Taxes) v Oceanic Contractors Inc [1983] 2 AC 130 at 145). The issue, he held, involved not one question, but two: firstly, what is the proper law of the liability in question; and secondly, whether that choice of law is overridden by the mandatory rules of the forum. A statute could be given such effect either expressly or by implication. He cited Lord Sumption in Cox v Ergo Versicherung AG [2014] UKSC 22 at para [29] that for a statute to have overriding effect by implication it would be necessary that:

(i) the terms of the legislation cannot effectually be applied or its purpose cannot effectually be achieved unless it has extra-territorial effect; or (ii) the legislation gives effect to a policy so significant in the law of the forum that Parliament must be assumed to have intended that policy to apply to any one resorting to an English court regardless of the law that would otherwise apply.

In construing the legislation, Irwin LJ felt the decisive issues were the references in sections 1(6) and 2(3)(c) which referred expressly to foreign law. In particular, section 1(6) provided:

… it is immaterial whether any issue arising in any such action was or would be determined (in accordance with the rules of private international law) by reference to the law of a country outside England and Wales.

He noted that section 7(3) also stated that the Act superseded "any right" which he construed to include any right under foreign law. Taken as a whole, he formed the view that the 1978 Act was intended to have overriding application and apply English law to the issue of contribution in all cases.

=== Concurring judgments ===
Both the other members of the court gave short supporting judgments.

Phillips LJ summarised the decision: "The creation of (i) a statutory right of contribution as between persons notwithstanding that the liability of one or more of them arises under foreign law and (ii) the exclusion of other rights of contribution (save for express contractual rights) can and should be read together as giving rise to the plain implication that the 1978 Act has extraterritorial effect."

David Richard LJ agreed with the other two members of the Court that the appeal should be dismissed, and that it was "inescapable that the 1978 Act is intended to have extra-territorial effect, in the sense that claims lie under it even though, applying the principles of private international law, they would be governed by a foreign law." But he disagreed with the other two members of the Court in that he did not view section 7(3) as definitive. He viewed that section as supporting either conclusion.

== Supreme Court ==
Before the Supreme Court, Lord Lloyd–Jones gave the unanimous decision of the court. The court held unanimously that the Civil Liability (Contribution) Act 1978 did not have mandatory or overriding effect, and thus the issue of whether a third party was obligated to make a contribution to a tort claim was a matter to be determined by the proper law of the tort. Accordingly, the claim against the third part for a contribution would fail as it was now barred by the applicable limitation period under German law.

== Commentary ==
The decision in the Court of Appeal was reviewed by Colin Riegels in the Law Quarterly Review, commenting that "[f]rom the point of view of the conflict of laws, the result could fairly be characterised as disappointing", and noting the disparity that this creates between choice of law rules for contribution claims against a third party on the hand (which will always be determined by English law), and contributory negligence claims against the plaintiff on the other (which will be determined by the governing law of the tort or contract). It also expressed concern that the decision in Roberts would still be regarded as good law under the subsequent Rome II Regulation rules because of the effect of article 16.

Also in relation to the Court of Appeal, a blog post by Professor Andrew Tettenborn referred to the ruling in critical terms, stating: "The decision will hardly do much for comity; nor does the result make much sense as part of a sensible scheme of private international law, since where it applies it is an open invitation to come and do some socially-distanced forum-shopping in England." However he added that the decision was of limited importance, as it related to the Private International Law (Miscellaneous Provisions) Act 1995 and expressed the view that the Rome II Regulation (which would now apply) would probably produce a different outcome. Another article noted "[t]his is an important decision with significant practical effect for clinical negligence litigation involving contribution claims in an international context", but cautioned "this case was not governed by the Rome II Regulation".

The Supreme Court decision received more positive attention from academics. Riegels, writing in the Law Quarterly Review, said that it "underscores the principle that there needs to be some clear positive impetus in order to construe a statute as having overriding effect". Harry Sanderson commented in the Lloyd's Maritime and Commercial Law Quarterly that the decision's respect for foreign law "must be viewed within the tortured history of comity within English private international law, in matters reaching beyond the ambit of contribution claims".
