= Singularis Holdings Limited (in liquidation) v Daiwa Capital Markets Europe Limited =

2019 ruling by Supreme Court of the UK

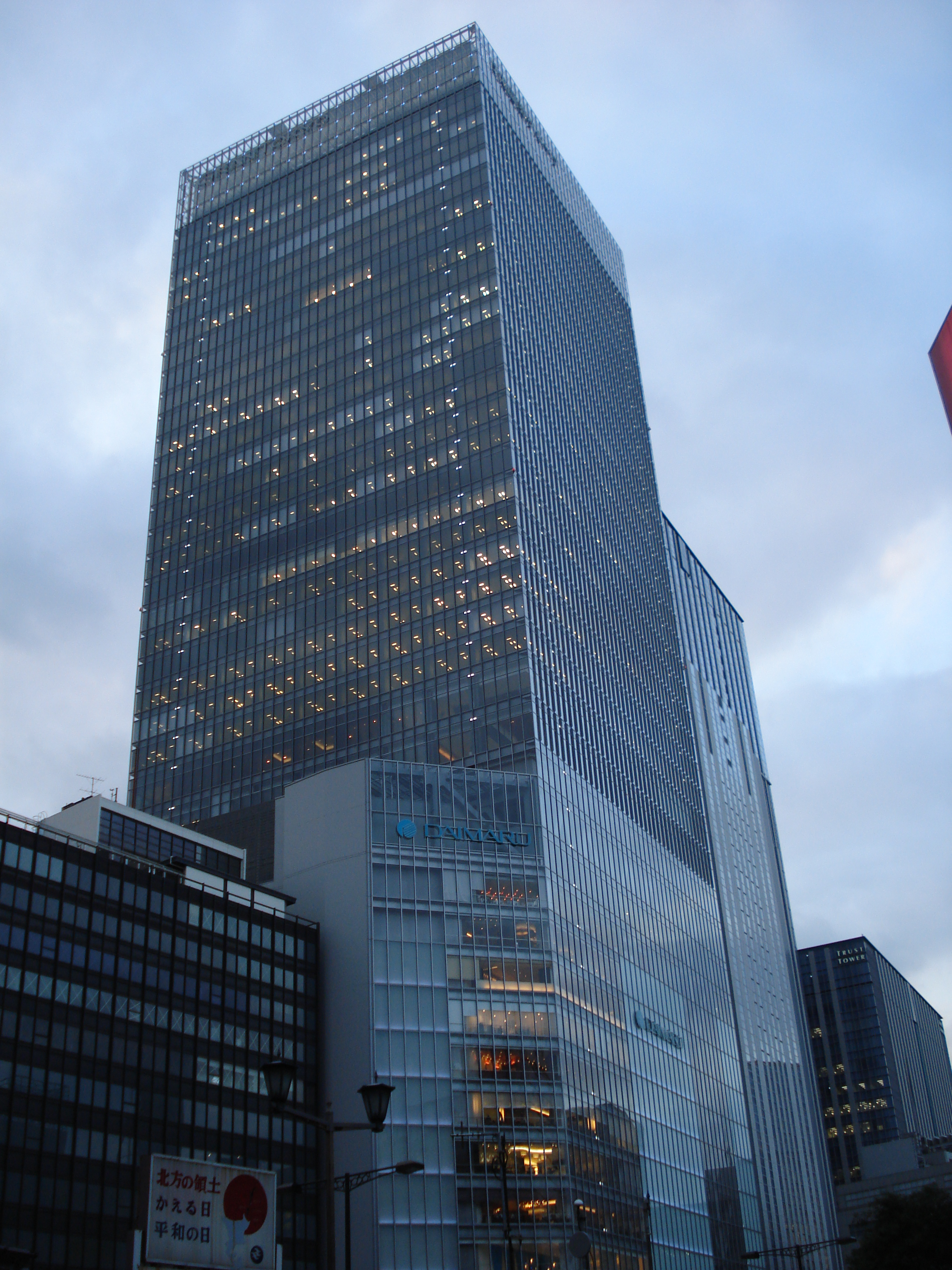
- Court: Supreme Court
- Decided: 30 October 2019
- Citation: [2019] UKSC 50
- Transcript: BAILII

Court membership
- Judges sitting: Lady Hale, Lord Reed, Lord Lloyd-Jones, Lord Sales, Lord Thomas

Keywords
- Duty of care; Fraud; Attribution; Illegality

Singularis Holdings Limited (in liquidation) v Daiwa Capital Markets Europe Limited [2019] UKSC 50 is a judicial decision of Supreme Court of the United Kingdom relating to the duties owed by a bank where a person acting on behalf of a corporate customer of the bank directs the bank to transfer money out of the company's account as part of a fraudulent scheme.

The principal issues in the case were whether the bank had breached its duty to its customer by transferring the monies despite the suspicious circumstances surrounding the transfer request, and if so, whether the claim of the customer against the bank was precluded by the fact that the fraudulent acts of the director should be attributed to the customer so as to bar the claim of the customer against the bank. The Supreme Court upheld the decision of the Court of Appeal, which had held that on the facts that the bank had breached the duty to their customer, and the fact that the fraud was perpetrated by a director of the corporate customer did not preclude the claim by that corporate customer against the bank.

Practical Law reported that this is the first decision where a bank in the United Kingdom had ever been held to be liable for breaching their duty to scrutinise customer transactions for possible fraud.

== Facts ==
Singularis Holdings Limited was a company incorporated in the Cayman Islands which was a personal asset holding company for Mr Maan Al Sanea. Mr Al Sanea was both a director and shareholder of Singularis. Singularis held a bank account with Daiwa Capital Markets Europe Limited which had very substantial sums of money in it.

Between 12 June and 27 July 2009 Mr Al Sanea gave eight separate instructions to Daiwa to make payments totalling approximately US$204 million out of Singularis' account. It was accepted by all parties that these payments instructions were fraudulent. At the time of the payments Singularis was on the verge of insolvency, and the payments were all made to other companies (referred in the judgment as the "Saad Group") which were owned and controlled by Mr Al Sanea.

Daiwa had raised concerns about the financial state of Singularis' financial position, as well as the freezing of Mr Al-Sanea's personal assets. Shortly before the relevant payment instructions, Daiwa's head of compliance sent an internal e-mail to colleagues:

"As you are all aware the SAAD group and some of the related individuals and entities have been experiencing well publicised problems including downgrades and the freezing of bank accounts. Under these circumstances can I re-emphasise the need for care and caution in terms of any activity on their accounts with us. Singularis have reasonably large sums of client money lodged with us and we need to ensure we maintain appropriate oversight of both further deposits and requests for payments … We should therefore ensure that any funds received relate to normal business activities and, if they are unsolicited, can clearly be linked back to their normal investment business … Clearly any payment requests we receive must be properly authorised and be 'appropriate' in the context of our business relationship with them. If there are any doubts or concerns please contact compliance or legal …".

That warning was not heeded, and the eight fraudulent payment instructions were paid out either without demanding any explanation at all, or on the basis of explanations that ostensibly appeared to be false. The Court of Appeal indicated that "There were failures at every level within Daiwa", and the trial judge found that Daiwa had a "dysfunctional structure leading to a sequence of events where everyone assumes that someone else is dealing with investigating the disputed payments but no one troubles to check whether that is right or not".

The trial initially came before Rose J, who handed down a lengthy judgment, in which she held that the bank had breached its duty to the customer, holding that "Any reasonable banker would have realised that there were many obvious signs that Mr Al Sanea was perpetrating a fraud on the company." However she reduced the claim by 25% to reflect the contributory negligence of the customer in allowing Mr Al Sanea to act without restraint. She further held that the fraud of Mr Al Sanea was not to be attributed to the company so as to bar any right of action on the basis of illegality.

== Judgment ==
Daiwa did not appeal against the finding of the trial judge that they had breached their duty of care as a bank to take reasonable care (the so-called Quincecare duty, after the decision of Steyn J in Barclays Bank plc v Quincecare Ltd [1992] 4 All ER 363). Instead they appealed against the decision of Rose J on five separate grounds:

- Mr Al Sanea's conduct and state of mind should have been attributed to Singularis for the purposes of its claim against Daiwa.
- Daiwa's duty did not extend to protecting the interests of Singularis' creditors and that, in circumstances where the only persons who suffered losses were creditors, for whose exclusive benefit the claim was brought, no claim lay against Daiwa.
- Daiwa had an equal and opposite claim for the tort of deceit which should have extinguished its claim.
- Singularis' claim should have been precluded by an illegality defence.
- But, if Daiwa was liable to Singularis, the reduction in damages should be greater than 25% under the Law Reform (Contributory Negligence) Act 1945.

=== Court of Appeal ===
Sir Geoffrey Vos gave the judgment of the Court of Appeal. After reviewing the facts and the relevant authorities, Sir Geoffrey expressed the view that there were essentially six core issues.

The first issue was whether the fraud of Mr Al Sanea should be attributed to Singularis. Counsel for Daiwa strongly urged that as Singularis was a "one man company" the fraud of Mr Al Sanea should be the fraud of the company. The Court of Appeal held that Rose J had correctly applied the test set out by the Supreme Court in Jetivia SA v Bilta (UK) Limited (in liquidation) [2015] UKSC 23, and that Singularis should not have that knowledge attributed to it. He cited with approval the comments of Lord Sumption in Jetivia:

The first was that the illegality defence is available against a company only where it was directly, as opposed to vicariously, responsible for it… Secondly, the majority was agreed in rejecting the primary argument of the auditors that once it was shown that the directing mind and will of a company (whether generally or for the relevant purpose) had caused it to defraud a third party and that the company was relying on that fraud to found its cause of action, the illegality defence necessarily barred the claim. Both Lord Phillips (para 63) and Lord Walker (para 173) rejected this submission as too broad, because it would involve the attribution of the agent's dishonesty to the company even if there were innocent directors or shareholders. Accordingly, both of them regarded it as critical that Stone & Rolls was a "one-man company", ie a company in which, whether there was one or more than one controller, there were no innocent directors or shareholders. Third, Lord Phillips and Lord Walker were agreed that, as between a "one-man" company and a third party, the latter could raise the illegality defence on account of the agent's dishonesty, at any rate where it was not itself involved in the dishonesty.

He further went on to elaborate that he did not find the phrase "one-man company" to be a helpful one. He noted in this case that Mr Al Sanea was not the sole director, although the other directors of Singularis were described as "supine".

The second issue was whether, if Daiwa succeeded on the first issue, the illegality defence would bar the claim of Singularis. The key authority in relation to illegality as a defence was now Patel v Mirza [2016] UKSC 42. As Daiwa had not succeeded on the first issue, Sir Geoffrey declined to spend a great deal of time considering the second issue, but he added only that if he had been called upon to determine the point, he was satisfied that Rose J had correctly applied the test at first instance. Rose J had considered the point fairly shortly herself, dismissing it in only five short paragraphs, but she had formed the view that "Applying the test set out by Lord Toulson points firmly in favour of rejecting the illegality defence put forward by Daiwa."

The third issue was whether the claim ought to fail because any breach by Daiwa was not causative of the loss. The appellants relied upon Berg Sons & Co v Adams [1992] BCC 661. In that case Hobhouse J had held that the directing mind of the company, to whom an auditor's report was directed, already knew the true facts. Therefore, his knowledge was attributed to the company, which meant that the company did not rely on the auditor's report, and the claim failed. The situation here, the appellants submitted, was exactly the same: once Singularis is identified with Mr Al Sanea's fraud, it is a dishonest company, and was not relying on Daiwa to perform its Quincecare duty.

The Court of Appeal dismissed that argument. It has already held that the fraud of its principal was not to be attributed to Singularis. But the court went on to hold that, even if Mr Al Sanea's fraud were to be attributed, the claim would still be rejected because the directors of Singularis who were not acting fraudulently were indeed relying on Daiwa for the performance of its Quincecare duty.

The appellants argued, in reliance upon the decision of Evans-Lombe J's decision in Barings plc v Coopers & Lybrand [2003] PNLR 34, that Daiwa should have an equal and opposite claim in deceit against Singularis.

The Court of Appeal rejected that contention. The court accepted that, ordinarily, a third party who was misled by Mr Al Sanea's false statements into entering into a transaction would be able to recover all losses flowing from that transaction. But in this case Daiwa was not an ordinary third party; it was in breach of a pre-existing legal duty to Singularis to refrain from making the payments whilst the circumstances put it on inquiry. Accordingly, the court held that, even if Mr Al Sanea's fraud were to be attributed to Singularis (which it was not), Singularis' claim cannot be defeated by an equal and opposite claim in deceit by Daiwa against Singularis.

The appellants argued that these claims were all brought by, and for the indirect benefit of, the creditors of Singularis (through the liquidator). The trial judge had held that there was no principle of law which entitled the court to consider what a party intended to do with the money it recovers, and that the solvency or insolvency of Singularis did not affect that principle. The Court of Appeal broadly endorsed that, holding "the identity of those creditors cannot in this situation affect the question of whether the company in liquidation has a claim against Daiwa for breach of its Quincecare duty."

The Court of Appeal indicated that to set aside an assessment of contributory the appellants would need to show that the trial judge had either made an error of principle or reached a conclusion wholly outside the range of reasonable possibilities. They quickly dismissed the suggestion saying that appellant's arguments "do not get off the ground".

The Court of Appeal dismissed all of Daiwa's claims in the appeal, and upheld the decision of the trial judge that it was liable to Singularis for its breach of the Quincecare duty to scrutinise instructions which would put an ordinary banker on notice of fraud.

Sir Geoffrey added a few remarks in closing. He stressed that it will be a rare situation for a bank to be put on inquiry under the Quincecare duty, and that there is a high threshold. In this case "any reasonable banker would have realised that there were many obvious, even glaring, signs that Mr Al Sanea was perpetrating a fraud on the company when he instructed that the money be paid to other parts of his business operations". He stressed that this case was an unusual one.

He also noted Daiwa sought to rely at every level of its argument on the existence of a prior fraud as a reason why it ought to have a successful defence. But this ignored the fact that the prior fraud is an essential ingredient of the claim for breach of the Quincecare duty.

Finally, he stressed in relation to the authorities that there is no proper comparison between the duties of an auditor and the duty of a banker. A banker's duties in respect of properly authorised instructions to make payments are strictly limited. The banker's duty only arises where, abnormally, the banker is put on inquiry by the particular circumstances. He approved the comments of Steyn J said in Quincecare that "trust, not distrust, is the basis of a bank's dealings with its customers".

=== Supreme Court ===
In the Supreme Court the unanimous decision was handed down by Lady Hale, dismissing the appeal.

== Significance ==
Commentary on the decision has been broadly positive. Despite the wide-ranging grounds of appeal in the Court of Appeal most of the commentary has focussed upon the first instance decision being upheld and the bank being found liable for breach of the Quincecare duty. Practical Law reported that, in the 25 years since Quincecare was decided, this is the first decision where a bank had ever been held to be liable for breaching the duty under English law.

Despite the comments of Sir Geoffrey Vos about the unusual facts of the case, and how liability under the Quincecare duty will be rare, inevitably banks will be concerned about being held liable for the frauds of others.
