= Tolofson v Jensen =

- Supreme Court of Canada

Hearing: February 21, 1994 Judgment: December 15, 1994
- Full case name: Leroy Jensen and Roger Tolofson v. Kim Tolofson; Réjean Gagnon v. Tina Lucas and Justin Gagnon by their litigation guardian Heather Gagnon, Heather Gagnon personally, and Cyrille Lavoie
- Citations: [1994] 3 S.C.R. 1022, 120 D.L.R. (4th) 289, 100 B.C.L.R. (2d) 1, 77 O.A.C. 81, [1995] 1 W.W.R. 609
- Docket No.: 23445
- Ruling: Tolofson and Gagnon appeals allowed.

Holding
- The proper law of a tort is the law of where the accident happened (lex loci)

Court membership
- Chief Justice: Antonio Lamer; Puisne Justices: Gérard La Forest, Claire L'Heureux-Dubé, John Sopinka, Charles Gonthier, Peter Cory, Beverley McLachlin, Frank Iacobucci, John C. Major

Reasons given
- Majority: La Forest J., joined by Gonthier, Cory, McLachlin and Iacobucci JJ.
- Concurrence: Major J.
- Concurrence: Lamer C.J.

Tolofson v Jensen, [1994] 3 S.C.R. 1022 is a landmark decision of the Supreme Court of Canada on conflict of laws in tort. The Court held that the primary determiner in selecting a country's law in tort should be the lex loci (the location where the tort occurred). The case was decided with Lucas (Litigation guardian of) v Gagnon.

== Background ==
Prior to this case, the leading case on the matter was McLean v Pettigrew, [1945] S.C.R. 62 which stated that the proper law to apply would always be the lex fori, the local law of the court, irrespective of the connection with the jurisdiction.

=== Tolofson case ===
A father and son from British Columbia are driving in Saskatchewan and are in a motor vehicle accident with Leroy Jensen, a resident of Saskatchewan. The son, Kim Tolofson, sues both Jensen and his father. Under Saskatchewan law the claimant must prove gross negligence in order for a gratuitous passenger to recover and the limitation period is 12 months. Kim did not sue for six years once he became 18 years old.

=== Lucas case ===
The Gagnon family from Ontario were driving in Quebec and were in a motor vehicle accident with Mr. Lavoie, a Quebec resident. No action was allowed under Quebec no-fault system.

== Ruling of the Court ==
Justice La Forest wrote for the majority. He considered the issue of territorial limits of jurisdiction. He concluded that the general policy interests were those of order and fairness. He was highly concerned of confusion resulting from complex rules.

La Forest explicitly stated that exceptions to this rule should be rare. He argued that exceptions would "encourage frivolous cross-claims and joinders of third parties", it would create uncertainty, discourage judges to make summary judgments, and would discourage settlement. He contemplated that there may be exception at the international level where there may be injustice or where both parties are domiciled in the forum.

Alberta later enacted a Limitations Act (R.S.A. 2000, c. L‑12, s. 12) to get around the result in Tolofson.

Subsequent cases have considered the limits of the exception to the Tolofson rule. In Hanlan v Sernesky (1998, Ont.CA) where the court found exception to the rule on an international matter. However, similar reasoning was rejected on provincial matters in Leornard v Houle (1997, Ont.CA).

== See also ==
- List of Supreme Court of Canada cases
- Boys v Chaplin [1969] 2 All E.R. 1085 (H.L.)
- Red Sea Insurance Co Ltd v Bouygues SA [1995] 1 AC 190 (P.C.)
- Morguard Investments Ltd v De Savoye, [1990] 3 S.C.R. 1077, and
- Hunt v T&N plc, [1993] 4 S.C.R. 289

== Sources ==
- J. Walker, "'Are we there yet?' Towards a New Rule For Choice of Law in Tort" (2000) 38 Osgoode Hall Law Journal 331.
