= James Shaw Willes =

Irish-born English judge

Sir James Shaw Willes (1814 – 2 October 1872) was a Judge of the English Court of Common Pleas.

Willes was born in Cork. He was educated at Trinity College, Dublin, where he took his BA degree in 1836, and later received an honorary LLD in 1860. He was called to the English Bar at Inner Temple in 1840, and commenced practice on the Home Circuit.

In 1850, he was appointed to the Common Law Commission, and helped in the preparation of the several Law Procedure Acts. When he was forty-one years old, he was appointed a puisne judge of the Common Pleas, receiving the honour of knighthood at the same time. "He was esteemed one of the wisest and most learned of English lawyers, displaying in his decisions not only a rare and profound knowledge of principles, but a wonderful power of dealing with complicated facts and evidence. His decisions on questions of mercantile and maritime law were especially lucid and convincing.

He presided at the trial in 1865 of Constance Kent for the murder of her young half-brother, Saville Kent at Road Hill House, Wiltshire in 1860, a case which had received massive publicity.

He killed himself, at his residence near Watford, Hertfordshire while suffering under temporary aberration of mind, the result of suppressed gout, aged about 58.

Willes is arguably most famous as the judge in Phillips v Eyre (1870) LR 6 QB and for the double actionability rule which arose from that case.

== Arms ==
Coat of arms of James Shaw Willes

Crest
A demi-lion rampant Or.
Escutcheon
Quarterly 1st & 4th Argent per fess Gules and Argent three lions rampant counterchanged within a single tressure flory counterflory Azure 2nd & 3rd Argent a chevron between three lozenges Ermine.
