= Ma'n =

Arabic male given name

مَعْن
- Romanisation: ALA-LC: Maʻn
- Pronunciation: Arabic pronunciation: [maʕn]
- Gender: male
- Language(s): Arabic

Other names
- Anglicisation(s): Ma'n, Man, Maan

Ma'n (Arabic: مَعْن / ALA-LC: Maʻn, Arabic pronunciation: [maʕn]; informally transcribed as Man or Maan) is an Arabic male given name, most famously borne by the 8th-century general and hero Ma'n ibn Za'ida, also known for his generosity. The word مَعْن (maʿn) has several meanings in Classical Arabic.

== People ==
- Ma'n ibn Za'ida, 8th-century Arab general and hero
- Ma'n, the ancestor of the Ma'n family
- Man Asaad, Syrian weightlifter
- Maan Al-Khodari, Saudi footballer
- Maan Al-Sanea, Saudi businessman
