= Carriage by Air Act 1961 =

Act of the Parliament of the United Kingdom

Carriage by Air Act 1961 (Note: Section 14(1).)
- Act of Parliament
- Parliament of the United Kingdom
- Long title: An Act to give effect to the Convention concerning international carriage by air known as "the Warsaw Convention as amended at The Hague, 1955", to enable the rules contained in that Convention to be applied, with or without modification, in other cases and, in particular, to non-international carriage by air; and for connected purposes
- Citation: 9 & 10 Eliz. 2. c. 27
- Territorial extent: United Kingdom (Note: See sections 12 and 13.)

Dates
- Royal assent: 22 June 1961
- Commencement: 22 June 1961 (Note: The Acts of Parliament (Commencement) Act 1793.)

Other legislation
- Amends: Fatal Accidents Act 1846; Law Reform (Miscellaneous Provisions) Act 1934; Law Reform (Contributory Negligence) Act 1945
- Repeals/revokes: Carriage by Air Act 1932
- Amended by: Limitation Act (Northern Ireland) 1946; Limitation Act 1963; Prescription and Limitation (Scotland) Act 1973; Statute Law (Repeals) Act 1974; Fatal Accidents (Northern Ireland) Order 1977; Civil Liability (Contribution) Act 1978; Carriage by Air and Road Act 1979; International Transport Conventions Act 1983; Carriage by Air Acts (Implementation of Protocol No. 4 of Montreal, 1975) Order 1999; Carriage by Air Acts (Implementation of the Montreal Convention 1999) Order 2002; Statute Law (Repeals) Act 2004; Air Passenger Rights and Air Travel Organisers' Licensing (Amendment) (EU Exit) Regulations 2019

Status: Amended

Text of statute as originally enacted

Revised text of statute as amended

Text of the Carriage by Air Act 1961 as in force today (including any amendments) within the United Kingdom, from legislation.gov.uk.

The Carriage by Air Act 1961 (9 & 10 Eliz. 2. c. 27) is an act of the Parliament of the United Kingdom that brought the amended (1955) Warsaw Convention into British law, repealing the Carriage by Air Act 1932 (22 & 23 Geo. 5. c. 36) which gave the original (1929) convention effect.

== Provisions ==
Sections 1 and 2 of the act cover its application to the United Kingdom, with section 1 allowing it to come into force when the Queen makes an Order in Council authorising it, and section 2 using the same procedure for changing or limiting its territorial extent. Section 5 creates a statute of limitations for the convention, saying that no claim of damages for a violation of the convention can be brought more than two years after the problem, defined as either the date the goods arrived or the date they should have arrived. Section 7 allows the Queen to exclude military people, cargo and aircraft from the convention, and Section 13 binds the Crown to following the act.

== Subsequent developments ==
Schedule 2 to the act was repealed by section 1 of, and part XI of the schedule to, the Statute Law (Repeals) Act 1974, which came into force on 27 June 1974.

== Bibliography ==
- Johnson, D.H.N. (1962). "Carriage by Air Act, 1961". Modern Law Review. 25 (5). Blackwell Publishing. ISSN 0026-7961.
