= Liability of trustees inter se in English law =

The Liability of trustees inter se in English law governs in what circumstances and to what extent a trustee in English trust law is liable for the acts and defaults of their co-trustees under English Law. In general trustees are under a duty to act jointly and have authority to act individually only if the trust instrument so provides. In principle therefore each trustee has an equal say in the management of the trust property and therefore in the event of a breach the trustees are jointly and severally liable for their actions.

However, trustees are only liable for their own breach and so a unilateral action by one trustee that constitutes a breach of trust will not engage the liability of another trustee's.

== Equitable principles still thought to survive ==
In situations where joint and several liability is engaged, contribution claims between parties are governed by the operation of the Civil Liability (Contribution) Act 1978, but, in addition there remain several equitable principles developed by the chancery division of the English Courts that are thought to remain in effect. Such principles are likely to influence the court in their interpretation of the 1978 Act.

=== Solicitor Trustees ===
Head v Gould was a case in English trust law concerning the indemnity of trustees inter se for a breach of a trust. Where a trustee has committed a breach of trust relying on the professional advice of a fellow solicitor trustee they were entitled to be indemnified by virtue of that reliance . It is one of the few common law situations concerning inter-trustee indemnity that is still thought to apply following the passing of the Civil Liability (Contribution) Act 1978. The rise of professional trustee companies has led to the suggestion that it may become of significant case law in the future.

==== Facts ====
Miss Head and Mr Gould were trustees of certain marriage settlements. Gould was a "Solicitor Trustee". The trustees sold the house that was part of the trust property, and in breach of trust paid the proceeds of the sale to a life tenant (Head's mother). Miss Head claimed a right to be indemnified by Gould in respect of her own liability for the breach, on the basis that she had acted in reliance on his professional advice. The court found she had not wholly relied on Gould's advice, and held her fully liable.

In giving judgment, Kekewich J considered the case of In re Turner, commenting

"I do not myself think that Byrne J or any other judges ever intended to hold that a man is bound to indemnify his co-trustee against loss merely because he was a solicitor, when that co-trustee was an active participant in the breach of trust complained of, and is not proved to have participated merely in consequence of the advice and control of the solicitor."

=== Sole Benefit ===
In Bahin v Hughes the situation where a sole trustee benefited from the breach of trust was considered by High Court. In that case there were two trustees, one of whom was passive in the management of the trust, one of those trustees acted honestly but in breach of the trust terms in making an investment. The passive trustee was unsuccessful in claiming an indemnity on the basis that it had been the actions of the other trustee that had caused the breach of trust. Cotton LJ felt that it would be wrong to punish a trustee who had acted honestly more than a trustee who had failed to act at all.

However, it is not clear exactly how far this principle can be extended and it is generally thought that Bahin v Huges should be treated with caution .
