= Red Sea Insurance Co Ltd v Bouygues SA =

Red Sea Insurance v Bouygues SA
- Court: Privy Council
- Full case name: Red Sea Insurance Co Ltd v Bouygues SA and 22 others
- Decided: 18 July 1994
- Citation: [1995] 1 AC 190
- Transcript: judgment

Case history
- Prior action: [1992] HKLR 161

Court membership
- Judges sitting: Lord Keith of Kinkel; Lord Slynn of Hadley; Lord Woolf; Lord Lloyd of Berwick; Lord Nolan

Case opinions
- Lord Slynn of Hadley

Keywords
- Conflict of laws; double actionability; choice of law in tort; flexible exception

Red Sea Insurance Co Ltd v Bouygues SA [1995] 1 AC 190 is a judicial decision of the Privy Council relating to choice of law in tort. The case was an appeal from the decision of the Court of Appeal of Hong Kong, but as the case was decided in Hong Kong pursuant to the English Law Ordinance, section 3(1), it is also taken to be an authoritative statement of English law.

== Facts ==
Bouygues SA together with nine other co-plaintiffs made a claim under a policy of insurance against Red Sea Insurance Co Ltd. Red Sea Insurance was an insurance company incorporated in Hong Kong, but with its head office located in Saudi Arabia. In its counterclaim Red Sea Insurance alleged that one of the co-plaintiffs, PCG, negligently supplied faulty pre-cast concrete building units, and that if it was liable at all, Red Sea Insurance would be subrogated to the claims of the other co-plaintiffs against PCG. PCG applied to strike out that counterclaim.

Red Sea then amended its pleading and claimed that the proper law governing the relations between Red Sea and PCG was the law of Saudi Arabia, and that under Saudi Arabian law, Red Sea had a direct right of action against PCG.

Those claims failed at first instance and in the Court of Appeal because:

- under Hong Kong law the right of action could only arise by way of subrogation once the claim had been paid under the policy of insurance;
- in order succeed in their amended counterclaim Red Sea needed to establish that they had a right of action under both Saudi Arabian law and Hong Kong law to satisfy the double actionability test;
- even though they had a good arguable case that there was a cause of action in tort under Saudi law, because they claim failed under Hong Kong law, it failed the dual actionability test, and therefore the claim was struck out.

Red Sea appealed to the Privy Council.

== Decision ==
Lord Slynn of Hadley gave the decision of the board.

After reviewing the relevant authorities Lord Slynn held that the "flexible exception" to the double actionability requirement which had been created by the House of Lords in Boys v Chaplin [1971] AC 356 could apply in favour of not only the forum (the lex fori) but also in favour of the law of the place where the tort occurred (the lex loci delicti commissi). In this case the facts were overwhelmingly connected with Saudi Arabia, and so Saudi Arabian law only should be applied to the relevant issue.

Lord Slynn further held that although Boys v Chaplin was predicated on a single issue (heads of loss) being subject to the flexible exception, it was possible that an entire claim could be subject to the exception. He stated: "The present appeal is not based on an isolated issue (as was the case in Boys v Chaplin). The contention put forward is that the whole case be decided according to the lex loci delictii. Although the cases may be rare where the exception should be applied the whole case, their Lordships do not consider that to apply the exception to the whole case is in principle necessarily excluded. In their Lordship's view the exception is not limited to specific isolated issues but may apply to the whole claim".

== Authority ==
In England the decision was followed by the Court of Appeal in Pearce v Ove Arup Partnership Ltd [2000] Ch 403, it has now largely been superseded by the Private International Law (Miscellaneous Provisions) Act 1995. However, it remains good law in other common law jurisdictions, and in England for claims relating to defamation.

In Canada, the double actionability rule itself was reversed by the Supreme Court of Canada in Tolofson v Jensen [1994] 3 SCR 1022, although the Supreme Court retained the concept of a flexible exception.

Similarly, in Australia the double actionability rule was abrogated by the High Court of Australia in John Pfieffer Pty Ltd v Rogerson (2000) 203 CLR 503. But similarly, a broad public policy style flexible exception similar to that in Red Sea Insurance v Bouygues SA was retained.
