= Duchy of Cornwall (No. 2) Act 1844 =

Act of the Parliament of the United Kingdom

Duchy of Cornwall (No. 2) Act 1844 (Note: The citation of this act by this short title was authorised by section 5 of, and the second schedule to, the Statute Law Revision Act 1948. Due to the repeal of those provisions, it is now authorised by section 19(2) of the Interpretation Act 1978.)
- Act of Parliament
- Parliament of the United Kingdom
- Long title: An Act to confirm and enfranchise the Estates of the Conventionary Tenants of the ancient Assessionable Manors of the Duchy of Cornwall, and to quiet Titles within the County of Cornwall as against the Duchy, and for other Purposes. (Note: These words are printed against this act in the second column of the second schedule to the Statute Law Revision Act 1948, which is headed "Title".)
- Citation: 7 & 8 Vict. c. 105
- Territorial extent: United Kingdom

Dates
- Royal assent: 9 August 1844
- Commencement: 9 August 1844 (Note: The Acts of Parliament (Commencement) Act 1793.)
Other legislation
Amended by	Limitation Act 1939; Statute Law (Repeals) Act 1978

Status: Amended

Text of statute as originally enacted

Revised text of statute as amended

Text of the Duchy of Cornwall (No. 2) Act 1844 as in force today (including any amendments) within the United Kingdom, from legislation.gov.uk.

The Duchy of Cornwall (No. 2) Act 1844 (7 & 8 Vict. c. 105), sometimes called the Duchy of Cornwall (Limitation of Time) Act 1844, is an act of the Parliament of the United Kingdom.

As of 2026, the act remains partly in force in the United Kingdom.

== Subsequent developments ==
Sections 71–80 of the act were repealed by section 34(4) of, and the schedule to, the Limitation Act 1939 (2 & 3 Geo. 6. c. 21), which came into force on 1 July 1940.

The whole act, except sections 39, 40, 53 to 70 and 92, and the definitions of "Conventionary Tenant" in section 92 of the act, and the schedules, was repealed by section 1(1) of, and part IV of schedule 1 to, the Statute Law (Repeals) Act 1978, which came into force on 31 July 1978.
