= Limitation Act 1980 =

Act of the Parliament of the United Kingdom

Limitation Act 1980 (Note: Section 41(1).)
- Act of Parliament
- Parliament of the United Kingdom
- Long title: An Act to consolidate the Limitation Acts 1939 to 1980.
- Citation: 1980 c. 58
- Territorial extent: England and Wales (Note: Section 41(4).)

Dates
- Royal assent: 13 November 1980
- Commencement: 1 May 1981 (Note: Section 41(2).)

Other legislation
- Amends: Law Reform (Miscellaneous Provisions) Act 1934; Animals Act 1971; Fatal Accidents Act 1976; See § Repealed enactments
- Repeals/revokes: See § Repealed enactments
- Amended by: List: Senior Courts Act 1981; Latent Damage Act 1986; Defamation Act 1996; Arbitration Act 1996; Defamation Act 1996; Trusts of Land and Appointment of Trustees Act 1996; Land Registration Act 1997; Land Registration Act 2002; Commonhold and Leasehold Reform Act 2002; Proceeds of Crime Act 2002; Mental Capacity Act 2005; Serious Organised Crime and Police Act 2005; Proceeds of Crime Act 2002 (External Requests and Orders) Order 2005; Fraud Act 2006; Tribunals, Courts and Enforcement Act 2007; Serious Crime Act 2007; Proceeds of Crime Act 2002 (External Requests and Orders) (Amendment) Order 2008; Coroners and Justice Act 2009; Policing and Crime Act 2009; Cross-Border Mediation (EU Directive) Regulations 2011; Welfare Reform Act 2012; Crime and Courts Act 2013; Proceeds of Crime Act 2002 (External Requests and Orders) (Amendment) Order 2013; Public Bodies (Merger of the Director of Public Prosecutions and the Director of Revenue and Customs Prosecutions) Order 2014; Alternative Dispute Resolution for Consumer Disputes (Amendment) Regulations 2015; Alternative Dispute Resolution for Consumer Disputes (Amendment) (No. 2) Regulations 2015; Enterprise Act 2016; Criminal Finances Act 2017; Automated and Electric Vehicles Act 2018; Cross-Border Mediation (EU Directive) (EU Exit) Regulations 2019; Alternative Dispute Resolution for Consumer Disputes (Extension of Time Limits for Legal Proceedings) (Amendment etc.) (EU Exit) Regulations 2020; Overseas Operations (Service Personnel and Veterans) Act 2021; Building Safety Act 2022; Northern Ireland Troubles (Legacy and Reconciliation) Act 2023; Automated Vehicles Act 2024; Digital Markets, Competition and Consumers Act 2024; Public Authorities (Fraud, Error and Recovery) Act 2025; Crime and Policing Act 2026
- Relates to: Limitation (Northern Ireland) Order 1989

Status: Amended

Text of statute as originally enacted

Revised text of statute as amended

Text of the Limitation Act 1980 as in force today (including any amendments) within the United Kingdom, from legislation.gov.uk.

The Limitation Act 1980 (c. 58) is an act of the Parliament of the United Kingdom applicable only to England and Wales. It is a statute of limitations which provides timescales within which action may be taken (by issuing a claim form) for breaches of the law. For example, it provides that breaches of an ordinary contract are actionable for six years after the event whereas breaches of a deed are actionable for twelve years after the event. In most cases, after the expiry of the time periods specified in the act, the remedies available for breaches are extinguished and no action may be taken in the courts in respect of those breaches.

== Summary of time limits ==
The ordinary time limits allowed by the act are set out below. (Note: The act makes reference to "ordinary time limits" and a number of circumstances in which "special time limits" arise.) These limits may, in some cases, be extended or altered. Most of the time limits run from the day after the accrual of action, which is "the earliest time at which an action could be brought". If the potential claimant was not at least 18 or did not have a sound mind at the time of the accrual of action, time will not run until he is at least 18 and has sound mind. Where there has been fraud or concealment, or the action is for relief from the consequences of a mistake, time will not run until the fraud, concealment or mistake is discovered or could with reasonable diligence be discovered.

Ordinarily applicable limitation periods for common types of claim
| | Type of claim | General limitation period |
|---|---|---|
| Trusts | Fraudulent breach of trust | No limit |
| Trusts | Recovery of trust property and breach of trust | 6 years |
| Land | Recovery of land | 12 years |
| Land | Recovery of money secured by a mortgage | 12 years |
| Land | Recovery of arrears of rent and consequential damages | 6 years |
| Contract | Speciality | 12 years |
| Contract | Simple contract | 6 years |
| Statute | Sum recoverable by virtue of statute | 6 years |
| Tort and personal injury | Tort: general rule | 6 years |
| Tort and personal injury | Personal injury | 3 years |
| Tort and personal injury | Personal injury stemming from sexual abuse of a child | No limit |
| Tort and personal injury | Fatal Accidents Act 1976 claims | 3 years |
| Tort and personal injury | Consumer Protection Act 1987 claims for personal injury or property damage | 3 years |
| Tort and personal injury | Conversion of goods | 6 years from first conversion |
| Tort and personal injury | Claims for personal injury, death or damage against ships or owners | 2 years |
| Tort and personal injury | Defamation and malicious falsehood | 1 year |
| Contribution | Contribution under the Civil Liability (Contribution) Act 1978 | 2 years |
| Contribution | Contribution under the Maritime Conventions Act 1911 | 1 year |
| Contribution | Human Rights Act 1998 claim against a public authority | 1 year |
| Unpaid criminal fine | His Majesty's Courts and Tribunals Service Magistrates' Court | N/A (No time limit) |

== Latent damage ==
The Latent Damages Act 1986 inserted section 14A into the 1980 Act, providing that if latent damage is discovered, the claimant will have three years from the date at which they are deemed to have known of the damage to make a claim in negligence, up to a maximum of 15 years from the accrual of the cause of action. The three year period commences "when the claimant first [has] both 'the knowledge required for bringing an action for damages in respect of the relevant damage' and a right to bring the action".

== Magistrates' court fine non-payment ==
In September 2016 His Majesty's Courts and Tribunals Service (HMCTS) set up the "Historic Debt Project" to tackle long outstanding unpaid criminal fines and financial orders, from debtors who previously were difficult to trace, with the use of new intelligence and tracing tools. Outstanding debts of 10 years and longer are pursued by a dedicated team in the HMCTS National Compliance and Enforcement Service. Magistrates' Court fines, being a criminal matter, are not subject to the Limitation Act 1980, neither can they be included in bankruptcy, an individual voluntary arrangement (IVA) or a debt relief order (DRO).

== Provisions ==
=== Repealed enactments ===
Section 40(3) of the act repealed 7 enactments, listed in schedule 4 to the act.

| Citation | Short title | Extent of repeal |
|---|---|---|
| 2 & 3 Geo. 6. c. 21 | Limitation Act 1939 | The whole act. |
| 7 & 8 Eliz. 2. c. 72 | Mental Health Act 1959 | In Schedule 7, Part I, the entry relating to the Limitation Act 1939. |
| 1963 c. 47 | Limitation Act 1963 | Sections 4 and 5. |
| 1963 c. 47 | Limitation Act 1963 | Section 7(7). |
| 1963 c. 47 | Limitation Act 1963 | Section 14(1). |
| 1963 c. 47 | Limitation Act 1963 | Sections 15 and 16. |
| 1975 c. 54 | Limitation Act 1975 | The whole act. |
| 1976 c. 30 | Fatal Accidents Act 1976 | In Schedule 1, paragraph 3. |
| 1978 c. 47 | Civil Liability (Contribution) Act 1978 | In Schedule 1, paragraph 6. |
| 1980 c. 24 | Limitation Amendment Act 1980 | Sections 1 to 9. |
| 1980 c. 24 | Limitation Amendment Act 1980 | Sections 11 to 13. |
| 1980 c. 24 | Limitation Amendment Act 1980 | Section 14(2) to (4). |
| 1980 c. 24 | Limitation Amendment Act 1980 | Schedules 1 and 2. |
