= Maan Al-Sanea =

Saudi businessman of Kuwaiti origin (born 1955)

Maan Abdul Wahed Al-Sanea
- Born: 1955 (age 70–71); Khobar, Saudi Arabia
- Occupation: Businessman
- Known for: Founding the Saad Group, a conglomerate with operations in construction & engineering, real estate development, financial services and investments
- Criminal status: Arrested in October 2017 in his home in Saudi Arabia

Maan Abdul Wahed Al-Sanea (born 1955, Khobar, Saudi Arabia) is a Saudi businessman of Kuwaiti origin. In 1980, he founded the Saad Group, a conglomerate with operations in construction & engineering, real estate development, financial services and investments. He has also founded a private hospital, several educational facilities and a support center for special-needs children and their families. It is alleged that he funded all this by defrauding his wife's family, the Al Gosaibis.

Al-Sanea’s family investment company, Saad Investments Co. Ltd. collapsed in 2009 and remains involved in a lengthy liquidation process, including the case Singularis Holdings Limited (in liquidation) v Daiwa Capital Markets Europe Limited.

In October, 2017, he was arrested in his home in Saudi Arabia.
