= Vivien Rose, Lady Rose of Colmworth =

British judge (born 1960)

The Right Honourable Lady Rose of Colmworth DBE
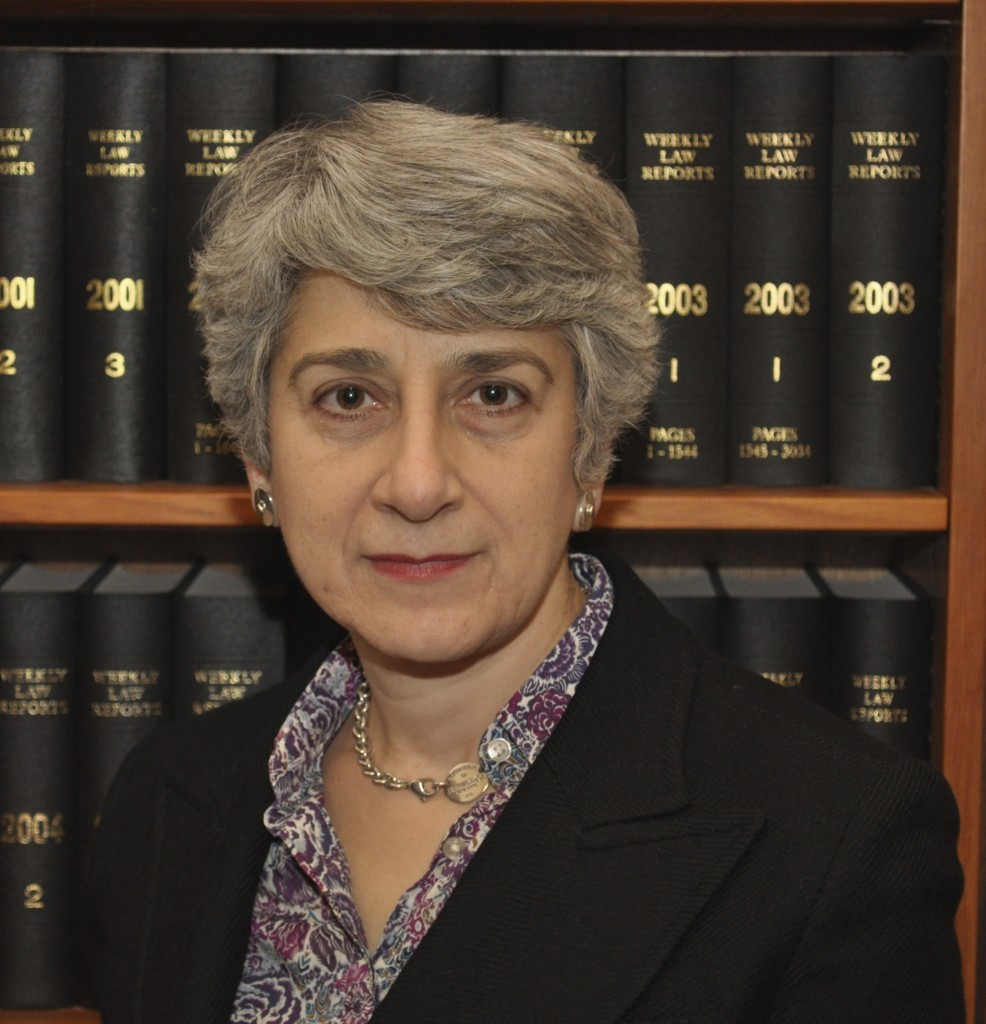

Justice of the Supreme Court of the United Kingdom
- Incumbent
- Assumed office 13 April 2021
- Nominated by: Robert Buckland
- Appointed by: Elizabeth II
- Preceded by: Lady Black of Derwent

Lady Justice of Appeal
- In office 16 January 2019 – 13 April 2021
- Nominated by: David Gauke
- Monarch: Elizabeth II

High Court Judge
- In office 13 May 2013 – 16 January 2019
- Nominated by: Chris Grayling
- Monarch: Elizabeth II

Personal details
- Education: Newnham College, Cambridge; Brasenose College, Oxford

Vivien Judith Rose, Lady Rose of Colmworth, DBE, PC (born 13 April 1960) is a British judge currently serving as a justice of the Supreme Court of the United Kingdom.

== Education ==
Rose was born in London to a Jewish family, daughter of Eric Rose and Jacqueline Sugarman. She took her first degree at Newnham College, Cambridge and the post-graduate BCL at Brasenose College, Oxford.

== Career ==
Rose was called to the bar at Gray's Inn in 1984. In 1992, she was appointed standing counsel to the Director General of Fair Trading. In 2006, she was made a Legal Chairman of the Competition Appeal Tribunal. She was approved to sit as a deputy High Court judge.

On 13 May 2013, she was appointed a High Court judge, assigned to the Chancery Division, and received the customary appointment as a Dame Commander of the Order of the British Empire (DBE). She was President of the Tax and Chancery Chamber of the Upper Tribunal. In 2019, she was appointed to the Court of Appeal, receiving the customary appointment to the Privy Council of the United Kingdom.

On 4 March 2021, it was announced that she would replace Lady Black of Derwent as a Justice of the Supreme Court of the United Kingdom. The Queen made the appointment on the advice of the Prime Minister and Lord Chancellor, following the recommendations of an independent selection commission. She assumed her new office on 19 April 2021, taking the judicial courtesy title of Lady Rose of Colmworth.

== Personal life ==
In 2002 she married Dr Bernard Joseph Bulkin, OBE.

== Notable decisions ==
Notable judicial decisions of Lady Rose include:

- Singularis Holdings Limited (in liquidation) v Daiwa Capital Markets Europe Limited [2017] EWHC 257 (Ch) in relation to breach of the Quincecare duty (upheld by the Court of Appeal on other grounds).
- NCL Investments Ltd v HMRC [2022] UKSC 9 in relation to the accounting treatment of employee share options scheme under tax law

== Links ==
- The Union of Choice for Senior Managers and Professionals in Public Service: Dame Vivien Rose, recent appointee to the High Court Chancery Division and former chair of the Competition Appeal Tribunal; archived on 3 March 2016, accessed 29 June 2026.
- About the Judiciary; accessed 22 March 2014.
- Vivien Rose profile; accessed 16 April 2024.
