= Sulaiman Hamad Al Gosaibi =

Saudi businessman

Sulaiman Hamad Al Gosaibi (Arabic: سليمان حمد القصيبي) was a Saudi businessman. He was the chairman of the board of the Ahmad Hamad Al Gosaibi & Brothers Group of Companies based in Alkhobar, Saudi Arabia until his death in February 2009.

== Early life ==
Sulaiman was born in Al Khobar, the youngest son of Hamad Ahmad Al Gosaibi, the founder of the family business. His brothers were Ahmad and Abdulaziz. He was a cousin of Ghazi Al Gosaibi

== Career ==
Inheriting a small but growing trading company from their father, who started the business in the 1940s, initially in the trade and banking sectors, Sulaiman was the youngest of three brothers who built a diversified business group with interests across the commercial spectrum, keeping pace with the Kingdom's petroleum fueled growth. Sulaiman was, until his death, the sole surviving brother and patriarch of the family conglomerate that was once considered among Saudi Arabia's most formidable merchant empires. He was its largest shareholder though management of the Group has been primarily delegated to the hands of his nephews, Yousef Ahmad Al Gosaibi (Group President) and Saud Abdul Aziz Al Gosaibi (Group Managing Director). His son, Dawood Sulaiman Al Gosaibi, is also active in family investments.

Sulaiman contributed to many philanthropic initiatives in the Eastern Province.

His brother Abdul Aziz Al Gosaibi died in 2003, was a partner in the company, and had an estimated fortune estimated at $2.9 billion.

== Death ==
He died on 23 February 2009, and was buried in the Thuqba Cemetery in Alkhobar.

== See also ==
- Al Gosaibi family
- List of billionaires
- AH Al Gosaibi & Bros website
