= Waite v North-Eastern Rly Co =

1858 English tort law case

Waite v North-Eastern Railway Co (1858) EB&E 719 is an old English tort law case concerning negligence and contributory negligence in the pre-Donoghue v. Stevenson and pre-Law Reform (Contributory Negligence) Act 1945 era. It was heard initially in the Exchequer Chamber.

== Facts ==
An action was brought on behalf of an infant by his next friend. The infant, which was five years of age, was with its grandmother, who took a half-ticket for the child and a ticket for herself to travel by the defendants' line; as they were crossing the railway to be ready for the train the child was injured by a passing train.

== Judgment ==
The jury found that the defendants were guilty of negligence, and that the grandmother was guilty of negligence which contributed to the accident, while there was no negligence of the infant plaintiff. A verdict was entered for the plaintiff, but in the Queen's Bench the verdict was entered for the defendants, without calling on them to argue, on the ground that the infant was identified with its grandmother.

== Subsequent cases ==
Afterwards, the case of the "Bernina," decided in 1888, where a passenger and an engineer on board the "Bushire" were killed in a collision between the "Bernina" and the "Bushire" caused by fault in both ships, but without fault on the part of the deceased, exploded this supposed doctrine, and made it clear that the defence of contributory negligence holds good only when the defendant contends and proves that the plaintiff was injured by his own carelessness.

== See also ==
- English tort law
