= Ahmad Hamad Al Gosaibi & Brothers =

Saudi business

Ahmad Hamad Al Gosaibi & Brothers (A. H. Al Gosaibi & Bros. or AHAB or Al Gosaibi Group) is a family-owned Saudi business group, formed by Hamad Ahmad Al Gosaibi in the late 1940s. It was originally a trading company offering money exchange services in the growing coastal town of Al Khobar. His three sons, Ahmad, Abdulaziz and Sulaiman (all three are deceased), came together to establish “Ahmad Hamad Algosaibi and Bros.” also known as AHAB. The company expanded its operations to include the world's most lucrative Pepsi Cola bottling franchises, oilfield services for oil giant Aramco, Real Estate, Hospitality, Food & Beverages and investments in Banking, Insurance, Shipping, Trading, Finance, and Manufacturing, reorganizing it into a holding company and, in the process, built it into among the most respected business houses in the Middle East.

AHAB is a general partnership, owned by the heirs of the three founding Al Gosaibi brothers. Sulaiman the youngest of the three founding brothers died in February 2009, his equity was then transferred to his son Dawood Sulaiman Algosaibi and his two daughters. The other two founders, Ahmad who died in 1991, transferred his equity to his sons Yousef Ahmad Al Gosaibi, Abdulmohsin Ahmad Al Gosaibi, Khalid Ahmad Al Gosaibi, and three of his daughters. As for Abdulaziz the third founding partner died in 2003 and his equity was then transferred to his wife, son Saud and his six daughters. Each of the three founders own one third of AHAB.

AHAB investments include vast real estate holdings, Al Gosaibi Hotel, Food & Beverage chains (CaliBurger, Popeyes, Vanellis), shipping, trading and manufacturing ventures. The Al Gosaibi Group have corporate partnerships with Jotun, Crown Holdings, in manufacturing operations throughout the Middle East. Their part past trading activities included being the major parts supplier to oil giant, Saudi Aramco, and currently representing companies as diverse as Jeumont of France.

== See also ==
- Al Gosaibi family
