= Civil Liability (Contribution) Act 1978 =

Act of the Parliament of the United Kingdom

Civil Liability (Contribution) Act 1978 (Note: Section 10(1).)
- Act of Parliament
- Parliament of the United Kingdom
- Long title: An Act to make new provision for contribution between persons who are jointly or severally, or both jointly and severally, liable for the same damage and in certain other similar cases where two or more persons have paid or may be required to pay compensation for the same damage; and to amend the law relating to proceedings against persons jointly liable for the same debt or jointly or severally, or both jointly and severally, liable for the same damage.
- Citation: 1978 c. 47
- Territorial extent: England and Wales; Northern Ireland; (Note: Section 10(3).)

Dates
- Royal assent: 31 July 1978
- Commencement: 1 January 1979 (Note: Section 10(2).)
Other legislation
Amends	Law Reform (Married Women and Tortfeasors) Act 1935; Law Reform (Contributory Negligence) Act 1945; Public Utilities Street Works Act 1950; Statute of Limitations (Northern Ireland) Act 1958; Carriage by Air Act 1961; Limitation Act 1963; Carriage of Goods by Road Act 1965; Carriage by Railway Act 1972; See § Repealed enactments
Repeals/revokes	See § Repealed enactments
Amended by	Limitation Act 1980; International Transport Conventions Act 1983; Limitation (Northern Ireland) Order 1989; New Roads and Street Works Act 1991

Status: Amended

Text of statute as originally enacted

Revised text of statute as amended

Text of the Civil Liability (Contribution) Act 1978 as in force today (including any amendments) within the United Kingdom, from legislation.gov.uk.

The Civil Liability (Contribution) Act 1978 (c. 47) is an act of the Parliament of the United Kingdom.

The act repealed the relevant common law and made new provision for contribution between persons who are jointly or severally, or both jointly and severally, liable for the same damage and in certain other similar cases where two or more persons have paid or may be required to pay compensation for the same damage; and to amend the law relating to proceedings against persons jointly liable for the same debt or jointly or severally, or both jointly and severally, liable for the same damage.

The core principle of the act is set out in section 1(1):

Subject to the following provisions ... any person liable in respect of any damage suffered by another person may recover contribution from any other person liable in respect of the same damage (whether jointly with him or otherwise).

== Background ==
Before the 1930s, a common law rule existed forbidding claims of contribution between joint tortfeasors, albeit with some exceptions to the general rule. In 1934, the Law Revision Committee argued for altering the common law rule to allow for claims of contribution between tortfeasors. Parliament enacted the Law Reform (Married Women and Tortfeasors) Act 1935 (and amended Northern Irish law to the same extent through the Law Reform (Miscellaneous Provisions) Act (Northern Ireland) 1937) in response to these recommendations.

In the 1957 case of McConnell v Lynch-Robinson, an owner of a house sued an architect over defects. The architect sought to have the building contractor added as a party over his contribution to the damage. The Northern Irish Court of Appeal refused to allow this application as he was not a tortfeasor under the 1937 law. The Law Commission considered this unsatisfactory and recommended that both the English and Northern Irish laws extend the rules on contribution to cover cases where damage is caused in non-tort contexts (including breaches of contract, trust or other duties).

== Application ==
The act applies to England, Wales and Northern Ireland.

== Interpretation ==
Barrister Daniel Atkinson describes the act as "complicated" and noted for "difficulties of analysis".

In Mouchel Ltd v Van Oord (UK) Ltd (No 2) it was held that "contribution" is not limited to a contribution in respect of damages. In Birse Construction Ltd v Haiste Ltd., Roch LJ pointed out that the word in section 1(1) of the Act "is 'damage', not 'damages', and the two things are quite different. Damages are the financial compensation for the damage, whatever it is that is sustained".

In Rahman v Arearose Ltd it was held that the "same damage" meant the kind of indivisible injury as arises under common law in a case of concurrent torts. This was affirmed by the High Court in Nationwide Building Society v Dunlop Haywards (DHL) Ltd.

In Soldiers, Sailors, Airmen and Families Association v Allgemeines Krankenhaus Viersen GmbH, the Supreme Court held that the Act did not have extra-territorial effect.

The Court of Appeal considered issues raised by the legislation in City Index v Gawler, finding that "knowing receipt" of fraudulently obtained money could fall within the scope of the s1(1) definition.

== Provisions ==
=== Repealed enactments ===
Section 9(2) of the act repealed 13 enactments, listed in schedule 2 to the act.

Enactments repealed by section 9(2)
Citation	Short title	Extent of repeal
25 & 26 Geo. 5. c. 30	Law Reform (Married Women and Tortfeasors) Act 1935	Section 6.
1 Edw. 8 & 1 Geo. 6. c. 9 (N.I.)	Law Reform (Miscellaneous Provisions) Act (Northern Ireland) 1937	Section 16.
8 & 9 Geo. 6. c. 28	Law Reform (Contributory Negligence) Act 1945	Section 1(3).
8 & 9 Geo. 6. c. 28	Law Reform (Contributory Negligence) Act 1945	In section 1(5) the words "or contributions".
10 & 11 Geo. 6. c. 44	Crown Proceedings Act 1947	Section 4(2) (including that section as it applies in Northern Ireland).
1948 c. 23 (N.I.)	Law Reform (Miscellaneous Provisions) Act (Northern Ireland) 1948	Section 2(3).
1948 c. 23 (N.I.)	Law Reform (Miscellaneous Provisions) Act (Northern Ireland) 1948	In section 2(5) the words "or contributions".
1958 c. 10 (N.I.)	Statute of Limitations (Northern Ireland) 1958	Section 74(5).
7 & 8 Eliz. 2. c. 65	Fatal Accidents Act 1959	Section 1(4).
1959 c. 18 (N.I.)	Fatal Accidents Act (Northern Ireland) 1959	Sections 1(4) and 3(1).
9 & 10 Eliz. 2. c. 27	Carriage by Air Act 1961	Section 4(1)(a).
10 & 11 Eliz. 2. c. 43	Carriage by Air (Supplementary Provisions) Act 1962	In section 3(1), the words from "paragraph" to "and in".
1964 c. 1 (N.I.)	Limitation Act (Northern Ireland) 1964	Section 4.
1972 c. 33	Carriage by Railway Act 1972	Section 6(6)(a).
SI 1977/1251 (N.I. 18)	Fatal Accidents (Northern Ireland) Order 1977	In Schedule 1, paragraph 1(2).
