= Phillips v Eyre =

English decision on the conflict of laws in tort

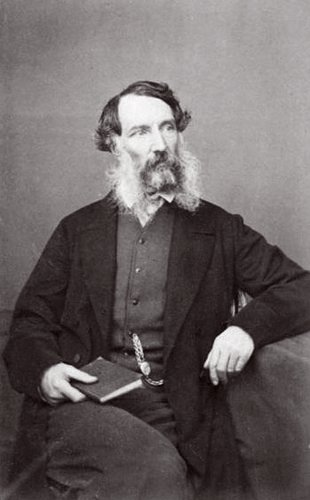
- Court: Court of Exchequer Chamber
- Decided: 23 June 1870
- Citation: (1870) LR 6 QB 1

Court membership
- Judges sitting: Kelly CB; Martin B Piggott B Cleasby B Willes J Brett J

Case opinions
- Willes J

Keywords
- Conflict of laws; double actionability; choice of law in tort

Phillips v Eyre (1870) LR 6 QB 1 is an English decision on the conflict of laws in tort. The Court developed a two limbed test for determining whether a tort occurring outside of the court's jurisdiction can be actionable. In time this came to be referred to as the "dual-actionability test" (or "double actionability test").

== Facts ==
Edward John Eyre had been the governor of Jamaica during the Morant Bay Rebellion. As governor he ordered a forceful response, which led to the deaths of numerous Jamaicans and the arrest and the summary execution of various political figures, whom Eyre believed to be instigators of the uprising. At the end of his term as governor, the colonial assembly had passed an Act of Indemnity covering all acts done in good faith to suppress the rebellion after the proclamation of martial law.

When he returned to England, several Jamaicans sued him for trespass to the person and false imprisonment in the Courts of England.

Peter Handford described the background to the case as follows:

In 1865 Edward John Eyre, the Governor of Jamaica, in the course of suppressing a revolt, caused a leading activist to be tried and executed under martial law. Over the next three years, a group of leading politicians and thinkers in England attempted to have Eyre prosecuted for murder. When the criminal process failed, they attempted to have him sued for trespass and false imprisonment. Though this case, Phillips v Eyre, was mainly concerned with constitutional issues, Willes J laid down a rule for choice of law in tort which endured for nearly a century before it was finally superseded.

The particular activist concerned was George William Gordon, a mixed-race member of the local assembly. Bad blood existed between Eyre and Gordon before the rebellion. Having had Gordon and William Bogle, the brother of Paul Bogle, the main leader in the revolt, arrested on suspicion of treason, both were tried under martial law and then summarily executed within two days. The entire suppression of the rebellion was undoubtedly extremely violent. Some 439 people were killed by British forces, a further 600 odd were flogged and about 1000 houses burned down. Further, evidence showed that some of the British officers treated the task as "hunting sport".

Although most contemporary accounts seem to blame specific British military officers (under the command of General Luke O'Connor), rather than Eyre, sensational reporting of both the rebellion and its bloody suppression made Eyre a controversial figure in Britain. That came to be known as the "Jamaica Question", which essentially boiled down to the question of whether Eyre to be regarded as a hero, who had fulfilled his duties as governor in suppressing the rebellion and saving the white population of Jamaica from massacre, or a murderer, who should be prosecuted and held accountable for his crimes. Attempt to bring criminal proceedings against Eyre failed and so the various activists tried again bringing a civil suit. The activists referred to themselves as the "Jamaica Committee" and included liberal thinkers like John Bright, Charles Buxton, Peter Alfred Taylor, John Stuart Mill, Thomas Hughes, Charles Darwin, Thomas Huxley and Goldwin Smith.

== Judgment ==
Exceptionally, the case was heard by a bench of six judges. Willes J gave the decision of the court.

Curiously, much of the case was dedicated not to the double actionability rule for which it would later be cited, but to argument upon whether (i) a law that was retrospective in nature was repugnant to natural justice and (ii) whether the law was defective as a matter of procedure as the Governor had passed a statute into law in respect of which he had a direct conflict of interest. The findings on double actionability are relegated to a few short passages near the end.

The Court held that Eyre could not be sued for his conduct in Jamaica. To bring an action the claimant must satisfy two requirements. Firstly, the alleged conduct must "be of such a character that it would have been actionable if it had been committed" in the local jurisdiction. Secondly, "the act must not have been justifiable by the law of the place where it was done." That is, it must be non-justifiable at the lex loci actus.

The Act that Eyre passed just before leaving caused his actions to be found to be justifiable by the law of Jamaica and thus he could not be actionable in England.

== Significance ==
One of the especially-contentious parts of Eyre's conduct was that the law he enacted was meant to cover all acts he had already done, which made de facto powers de jure. There is a presumption in English law against retrospective effect, and Willes J, who gave the judgment, noted, "The court will not ascribe retrospective force to new laws affecting rights unless by express words or necessary implication that such was the intention of the legislature". It was held in that case that Eyre's intention was clear.

The double actionability rule has now largely been abrogated in English law pursuant to the Private International Law (Miscellaneous Provisions) Act 1995, but it still applies to defamation claims. However, the case remains good law in a number of other common law jurisdictions.

== See also ==
- Boys v Chaplin [1971] AC 356
- Colin Blackburn, Baron Blackburn
