= Law Reform (Contributory Negligence) Act 1945 =

Act of the Parliament of the United Kingdom

Law Reform (Contributory Negligence) Act 1945 (Note: Section 7.)
- Act of Parliament
- Parliament of the United Kingdom
- Long title: An Act to amend the law relating to contributory negligence and for purposes connected therewith.
- Citation: 8 & 9 Geo. 6. c. 28
- Territorial extent: England and Wales; Scotland; Northern Ireland (in part); (Note: Section 6.)

Dates
- Royal assent: 15 June 1945
- Commencement: 15 June 1945 (Note: The Acts of Parliament (Commencement) Act 1793.)

Other legislation
- Amended by: National Insurance (Industrial Injuries) Act 1946; Carriage by Air Act 1961; Fatal Accidents Act 1976; Civil Liability (Contribution) Act 1978

Status: Amended

Text of statute as originally enacted

Revised text of statute as amended

Text of the Law Reform (Contributory Negligence) Act 1945 as in force today (including any amendments) within the United Kingdom, from legislation.gov.uk.

The Law Reform (Contributory Negligence) Act 1945 (8 & 9 Geo. 6. c. 28) is an act of the Parliament of the United Kingdom, which allows a judge to apportion liability for compensatory damages as he feels to be "just and equitable" between a tortfeasor and an injured person who was partly to blame. Section 1(1) of the act provides:

"Where any person suffers damage as the result partly of his own fault and partly of the fault of any other person(s), a claim in respect of that damage will not be defeated by reason of the fault of the person suffering the damage, but the damages recoverable in respect thereof shall be reduced to such extent as the court thinks just and equitable having regard to the claimant's share in the responsibility for the damage."

== Background ==
Until the act was passed, English tort law had held that contributory negligence was a full defence to negligence. This rule composed what is sometimes called the "unholy trinity" of defences to negligence which wrought particular hardship on 19th century workers, and barred them from any compensation for ghastly workplace injuries (the other two are common employment and volenti non fit injuria). It meant that if an employer was 99% at fault for his worker being mangled in his machinery, but the worker was 1% at fault, then the worker could recover nothing in compensation for injuries. Outside the workplace, an example of the defence is found in Waite v North-Eastern Railway Co where a grandmother and an infant that were hit by a negligently driven train were barred from any claim.

The act was passed during the Churchill caretaker ministry and received royal assent on 15 June 1945, immediately before Parliament was prorogued for the 1945 general election.

This harsh common law defence subsisted longer in other countries than in the United Kingdom. An example is seen in The Wagon Mound (No 1) where the claimant conceded that a burning ship accident was unforeseeable in order to avoid the contemporary Australian contributory negligence bar.

The act was not based on entirely new principles: the Collision Convention of 1910 had already provided that where two ships collide, blame may be apportioned between the two, so that each's contribution to the accident may be calculated to determine the settlement by way of damages. Often, blameworthiness reflected each party's degree of breach of the COLREGS. Normally blame would be apportioned in simple ratios; 50:50, 60:40, 75:25, etc.) Only rarely would the proportion be 100:0, as in The Oropesa.

In the UK, before the wearing of car seatbelts become obligatory, difficult legal questions arose when a passenger who failed to wear a seatbelt was injured. If the passenger had voluntarily chosen not to wear a seatbelt, was that person volenti to the injury? If so, volenti being a complete defence, the passenger would fail in a claim for negligence. In Froom v Butcher, Lord Denning MR sliced the Gordian knot by declaring that such a passenger was not volenti but rather was 20% contributorily negligent in the matter. Denning MR declared that "determining whether one is guilty of contributory negligence is a matter not of the cause of the accident, but of the cause of the damage", and he thereby ensured that the injured passenger could successfully claim against the driver's insurance, albeit that the claim would be only 80% of the loss.

== See also ==
- English tort law
- Misrepresentation in English law
- Gran Gelato Ltd v Richcliff [1992] Ch 560
- Singularis Holdings Limited (in liquidation) v Daiwa Capital Markets Europe Limited
