= Limitation Act 1939 =

Act of the Parliament of the United Kingdom

Limitation Act 1939 (Note: Section 34(1).)
- Act of Parliament
- Parliament of the United Kingdom
- Long title: An Act to consolidate with amendments certain enactments relating to the limitation of actions and arbitrations.
- Citation: 2 & 3 Geo. 6. c. 21
- Territorial extent: England and Wales (Note: Section 34(3).)

Dates
- Royal assent: 25 May 1939
- Commencement: 1 July 1940 (Note: Section 34(2).)
- Repealed: 1 May 1981
Other legislation
Amends	Supreme Court of Judicature Act 1873; Law Reform (Miscellaneous Provisions) Act 1934; See § Repealed enactments
Repeals/revokes	See § Repealed enactments
Amended by	Law Reform (Limitation of Actions, etc.) Act 1954; Limitation Act 1963; Statute Law (Repeals) Act 1969
Repealed by	Limitation Act 1980
Relates to	Limitation Act 1963

Status: Repealed

Text of statute as originally enacted

The Limitation Act 1939 (2 & 3 Geo. 6. c. 21) was an act of the Parliament of the United Kingdom that simplified the law relating to limitation periods in England & Wales. The act was based on the fifth report of the Law Revision Committee and is divided into three parts, with Part I dealing with limitation periods, Part II dealing with exceptions and Part III dealing with general matters.

Section 2 of part I introduces a new limitation period; six years for all cases in tort and contract. The period runs from the point where the injury or problem was created, not from when it was discovered; thus, the act replicates problems later solved by the Limitation Act 1963. Part II allows for a "resetting" of the limitation period in situations where the party is insane, not a legal adult or imprisoned for either the death penalty or for penal servitude.

== Provisions ==
=== Repealed enactments ===
Section 34(4) of the act repealed 21 enactments, listed in the schedule to the act.

Citation	Short title	Description	Extent of repeal
31 Eliz. c. 5	Common Informers Act 1588	An Act concerning Informers.	Section five.
21 Jas. 1. c. 16	Limitation Act 1623	The Limitation Act, 1623.	Sections three, four and seven.
4 & 5 Ann. c. 3 (Note: This is the citation in The Statutes of the Realm.)	Administration of Justice Act 1705	An Act for the amendment of the Law and the better Advancement of Justice.	Sections seventeen to nineteen.
9 Geo. 3. c. 16	Crown Suits Act 1769	The Crown Suits Act, 1769.	The whole act.
9 Geo. 4. c. 14	Statute of Frauds Amendment Act 1828	The Statute of Frauds Amendment Act 1828.	Sections one, three, four and eight.
3 & 4 Will. 4. c. 27	Real Property Limitation Act 1833	The Real Property Limitation Act, 1833.	The whole act.
3 & 4 Will. 4. c. 42	Civil Procedure Act 1833	The Civil Procedure Act, 1833.	Sections three to seven.
7 Will. 4 & 1 Vict. c. 28	Real Property Limitation Act 1837	The Real Property Limitation Act, 1837.	The whole act.
5 & 6 Vict. c. 97	Limitations of Actions and Costs Act 1842	The Limitations of Actions and Costs Act, 1842.	Section five.
6 & 7 Vict. c. 54	Limitation of Actions Act 1843	The Limitation of Actions Act, 1843.	Section three.
7 & 8 Vict. c. 105	Duchy of Cornwall (No. 2) Act 1844	An Act to confirm and enfranchise the estates of the conventionary tenants of the ancient assessionable manors of the Duchy of Cornwall, and to quiet titles within the county of Cornwall as against the Duchy, and for other purposes.	Sections seventy-one to eighty.
19 & 20 Vict. c. 97	Mercantile Law Amendment Act 1856	The Mercantile Law Amendment Act, 1856.	Sections nine to fourteen.
23 & 24 Vict. c. 53	Duchy of Cornwall Act 1860	An Act for the limitation actions and suits by the Duke of Cornwall in relation to real property, and for authorising certain leases of possessions of the Duchy.	Sections one and two.
24 & 25 Vict. c. 62	Crown Suits Act 1861	The Crown Suits Act, 1861.	The whole act.
36 & 37 Vict. c. 66	Supreme Court of Judicature Act 1873	The Supreme Court of Judicature Act, 1873.	Subsection two of section twenty-five.
37 & 38 Vict. c. 57	Real Property Limitation Act 1874	The Real Property Limitation Act, 1874.	The whole act.
51 & 52 Vict. c. 59	Trustee Act 1888	The Trustee Act, 1888.	The whole act.
56 & 57 Vict. c. 61	Public Authorities Protection Act 1893	The Public Authorities Protection Act, 1893.	Paragraph (a) of section one, except so far as it relates to criminal proceedings.
15 & 16 Geo. 5. c. 23	Administration of Estates Act 1925	The Administration of Estates Act, 1925.	In subsection (2) of section thirty the words "within the same time and".
17 & 18 Geo. 5. c. 21	Moneylenders Act 1927	The Moneylenders Act, 1927.	Paragraph (d) of subsection (1) of section thirteen and the word "and" at the end of paragraph (c) of that subsection.
24 & 25 Geo. 5. c. 14	Arbitration Act 1934	The Arbitration Act, 1934.	In section sixteen, subsections (1) and (2), in subsection (4) the words "of this section and for the purpose of the statutes of limitations as applying to arbitrations and," and subsections (7) and (8).

== Subsequent developments ==
The whole act was repealed by section 40(3) of, and schedule 4 to, the Limitation Act 1980, which came into force on 1 May 1981.

== Bibliography ==
- Unger, J. (1940). "Limitation Act, 1939". Modern Law Review. 4 (1). Blackwell Publishing: 45–50. doi:10.1111/j.1468-2230.1940.tb02730.x. ISSN 0026-7961.
