= Statute Law (Repeals) Act =

Stock short title used for UK legislation

Statute Law (Repeals) Act is a stock short title which is used for acts of the Parliament of the United Kingdom whose purpose is to repeal enactments which are no longer of practical utility. These acts are drafted by the Law Commission and the Scottish Law Commission.

Statute Law (Repeals) Acts may collectively refer to enactments with this short title.

The short title "Statute Law (Repeals) Bill" was proposed, in the Law Commission's first report on statute law revision, for the draft bill contained therein, instead of the more usual short title "Statute Law Revision Bill", because that draft bill had a broader scope than previously enacted bills.

Bills prepared by one or both of the Law Commissions to promote the reform of the statute law by the repeal, in accordance with Law Commission recommendations, of certain enactments which (except in so far as their effect is preserved) are no longer of practical utility, whether or not they make other provision in connection with the repeal of those enactments, together with any Law Commission report on any such bill, must be referred to the Joint Committee on Consolidation etc. Bills.

Halsbury's Laws of England said that Statute Law (Repeals) Acts are law reform acts. They are classed as consolidation bills, and as such are subject to an expedited legislative procedure in which they proceed without debate.

== List ==
Acts of Parliament

- The Statute Law (Repeals) Act 1969 (c. 52)
- The Statute Law (Repeals) Act 1971 (c. 52)
- The Statute Law (Repeals) Act 1973 (c. 39)
- The Statute Law (Repeals) Act 1974 (c. 22)
- The Statute Law (Repeals) Act 1975 (c. 10)
- The Statute Law (Repeals) Act 1976 (c. 16)
- The Statute Law (Repeals) Act 1977 (c. 18)
- The Statute Law (Repeals) Act 1978 (c. 45)
- The Statute Law (Repeals) Act 1981 (c. 19)
- The Statute Law (Repeals) Act 1986 (c. 12)
- The Statute Law (Repeals) Act 1989 (c. 43)
- The Statute Law (Repeals) Act 1993 (c. 50)
- The Statute Law (Repeals) Act 1995 (c. 44)
- The Statute Law (Repeals) Act 1998 (c. 43)
- The Statute Law (Repeals) Act 2004 (c. 14)
- The Statute Law (Repeals) Act 2008 (c. 12)
- The Statute Law (Repeals) Act 2013 (c. 2)

Measure of the General Synod

- The Statute Law (Repeals) Measure 2018 (No. 1)

=== Isle of Man ===
- The Statute Law Repeals (Isle of Man) Order 1984

=== Victoria, Australia ===
- The Statute Law Repeals Act 2007 (No 21)

=== Western Australia ===
- The Statutes (Repeals) Act 2014 (No. 32)
- The Statutes (Repeals) Act 2016 (No. 50)

== See also ==
- List of short titles
- Law Reform Act
- Statute Law Revision Act
