= Jill Black, Lady Black of Derwent =

British judge (born 1954)

The Right Honourable Lady Black of Derwent DBE
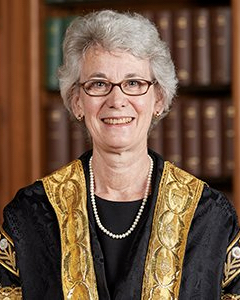

Justice of the Supreme Court of the United Kingdom
- In office 2 October 2017 – 10 January 2021
- Nominated by: David Lidington
- Appointed by: Elizabeth II
- Preceded by: Lord Toulson
- Succeeded by: Lady Rose of Colmworth

Lady Justice of Appeal
- In office 15 June 2010 – 1 October 2017
- Preceded by: Sir Nicholas Wall

Personal details
- Born: 1 June 1954 (age 72)
- Education: Trevelyan College, Durham

Jill Margaret Black, Lady Black of Derwent, DBE, PC (née Currie; born 1 June 1954) is a former Justice of the Supreme Court of the United Kingdom.

== Family ==
She is the daughter of two medical doctors, James Irvine Currie and Margaret Yvonne Currie. She was educated at Penrhos College and read law at the University of Durham. She married David Charles Black in 1978. They had a son and a daughter. After they were divorced in 2013, she married fellow Court of Appeal judge Sir Richard McCombe.

== Career ==
She was called to the bar in 1976 at Inner Temple. She specialised in family law and became a Queen's Counsel in 1994 and was appointed a deputy High Court judge in 1996 and a Recorder in 1999.

She was appointed to the High Court on 1 October 1999, and received the customary appointment as a Dame Commander of the Order of the British Empire. She was assigned to the Family Division, and served as Family Division Liaison Judge to the Northern Circuit from 2000 to 2004. On 15 June 2010, Black became a Lady Justice of Appeal, and was appointed to the Privy Council.

In 2004, she became Chairman of the Judicial Studies Board's Family Committee. She continued in that role until her appointment to the Judicial Appointments Commission as a judicial member in 2008.

It was announced on 21 July 2017 that Lady Justice Black would become the second female judge of the Supreme Court of the United Kingdom, after The Baroness Hale of Richmond. She took office on 2 October 2017, choosing the judicial courtesy title of Lady Black of Derwent. On 30 October 2020 it was announced that Lady Black of Derwent would retire as a Justice of the Supreme Court of the United Kingdom on 10 January 2021.

== Recognition ==
Her name is one of those featured on the sculpture Ribbons, unveiled in 2024.

== See also ==
- List of Durham University people
