= Limitation Act 1963 =

Act of the Parliament of the United Kingdom

Limitation Act 1963 (Note: Section 16(1).)
- Act of Parliament
- Parliament of the United Kingdom
- Long title: An Act to extend in certain cases the time-limit for bringing legal proceedings where damages are claimed which consist of or include damages or solatium in respect of personal injuries (including any disease or impairment of a person's physical or mental condition) or in respect of a person's death; to limit the time within which proceedings for contribution may be brought under section 6 of the Law Reform (Married Women and Tortfeasors) Act 1935 or section 3 (2) of the Law Reform (Miscellaneous Provisions) (Scotland) Act 1940; to make further provision as to the application of the Limitation (Enemies and War Prisoners) Act 1945 to Northern Ireland; and for purposes connected with the matters aforesaid.
- Citation: 1963 c. 47
- Territorial extent: England and Wales (whole act); Scotland (part II); Northern Ireland (section 14); (Note: Section 16(2)–(3).)

Dates
- Royal assent: 31 July 1963
- Commencement: 31 July 1963 (Note: The Acts of Parliament (Commencement) Act 1793.)
- Repealed: 1 May 1981
Other legislation
Amends	Limitation Act 1939; Limitation (Enemies and War Prisoners) Act 1945; Law Reform (Limitation of Actions, etc.) Act 1954
Amended by	Law Reform (Miscellaneous Provisions) Act 1971; Civil Liability (Contribution) Act 1978
Repealed by	Prescription and Limitation (Scotland) Act 1973; Northern Ireland Constitution Act 1973; Limitation Act 1975; Limitation Act 1980
Relates to	Law Reform (Married Women and Tortfeasors) Act 1935; Law Reform (Married Women and Tortfeasors) Act 1935; Limitation (Enemies and War Prisoners) Act 1945

Status: Repealed

Text of statute as originally enacted

The Limitation Act 1963 (c. 47) was an act of the Parliament of the United Kingdom that amended the statute of limitations to allow actions in some cases where the injured party had not discovered the injury until after the standard date of expiration. The act was based on the report of the Davies Committee on Limitation of Actions in Cases of Personal Injury, created after the Court of Appeal decision in the case of Cartledge v Jopling, and the committee notably produced their final report before Cartledge had been heard in the House of Lords. The draft bill was presented to Parliament on 6 May 1963; it was given royal assent on 31 July and came into force on the same day.

The act allowed an injured party to bring a claim outside the normal statute of limitations period if he could show that he was not aware of the injuries himself until after the limitation period had expired and if he gained the permission of the court. After a series of problems emerged, including vagueness on a point even the House of Lords was unable to clarify and poor draftsmanship, the act was repealed bit by bit during the 1970s, with the Limitation Act 1980 scrapping the last remaining sections.

== Background ==
Before the passing of the 1963 act, the only exceptions to the normal statute of limitations (three years after the events that caused the injury, as established by the Law Reform (Limitation of Actions, etc.) Act 1954 (2 & 3 Eliz. 2. c. 36)) were if the claim was being brought for a case of mistake or fraud, in which case the statute of limitations was twelve months from when the claimant could reasonably have been expected to discover the fraud or mistake. In Cartledge v E. Jopling & Sons Ltd the claimant sued Jopling after he developed pneumoconiosis from working in the company's poorly ventilated steel mills. The injuries were sustained in October 1950 but they were not discovered until 1956, and as a result the injured party had no cause of action. Because the injuries had not been discovered until six years after they were caused, and the statute of limitations was three years after the injury itself, Cartledge was not legally allowed to bring a case.

Cartledge pursued the claim anyway in an attempt to have the law changed, and decisions were made against him in both the High Court and the Court of Appeal. After the Court of Appeal decision a Committee on Limitation of Actions in Cases of Personal Injury was created under Mr Justice Davies, which produced its report before the Cartledge case had even got to the House of Lords. The report, published in September 1962, made several recommendations which found their way into a Limitation Bill placed before Parliament on 6 May 1963. While it was passing through the House of Lords, Lord Reid suggested it would be simpler to amend the Limitation Act 1939 (2 & 3 Geo. 6. c. 21), but this was never acted on. The act received royal assent on 31 July 1963 and came into force immediately.

== Act ==
The act created exceptions to the normal statute of limitations in addition to the previous ones of fraud and mistake. It introduced an exception if 1) the permission of the court had been gained to bring a case and 2) the "material facts" of the case included "facts of a decisive character" which the claimant was not aware of until after the expiry of the statute of limitations. Where these two requirements were fulfilled, a case could be brought as long as it was within twelve months of the claimant finding out the "facts of a decisive character". The same principles applied if the injured party were dead and the claim was being brought on behalf of his estate or dependants. If leave was refused to open a case, the decision could be appealed up to the Court of Appeal of England and Wales, but no further.

These provisions covered both Cartledge-like situations and cases where the injured party, while aware of his injuries, does not connect them to the true cause until more than three years after the injuries were sustained. The act had a limited retrospective effect – it covered injuries that had happened before the act came into force if an action had not been brought. If a judgment had already been made in a case, the act could not apply to it, meaning the act actually had no effect on the Cartledge case itself.

== Problem and repeal ==
The main problem with the act was whether or not the claimant had to know he had a method of action or not for the standard limitation period to apply. The House of Lords had an opportunity to resolve this in Central Asbestos Co Ltd v Dodd but "failed spectacularly", making a decision so confused that the Court of Appeal in Harper and others v National Coal Board said they could not actually find a ratio decidendi anywhere in the House of Lords' opinion. The act also suffered from drafting problems – in Central Asbestos Lord Reid described it as having "a strong claim to the distinction of being the worst drafted Act on the statute book". The act was repealed piecemeal by a series of acts during the 1970s, and the Limitation Act 1980 finally repealed the last remaining sections.

== Bibliography ==
- Dworkin, Gerald (March 1964). "Limitation Act, 1963". The Modern Law Review. 27 (2). Blackwell Publishing. ISSN 1468-2230.
- Jolowicz, J. A. (April 1964). "Limitation Act, 1963". Cambridge Law Journal. 22 (1). Cambridge University Press. ISSN 0008-1973.
- Patten, Keith (July 2006). "Limitation periods in personal injury claims - justice obstructed?". Civil Justice Quarterly (25). Sweet & Maxwell. ISSN 0261-9261.
