= Barclays Bank plc v Quincecare Ltd =

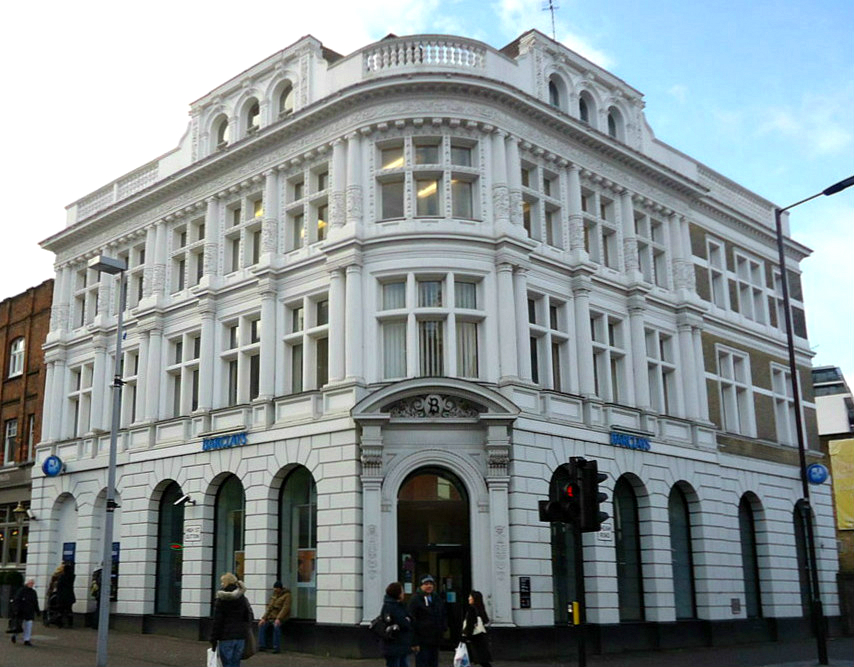
- Court: High Court
- Decided: 24 February 1988
- Citation: [1992] 4 All ER 363

Case history
- Subsequent action: Philipp v Barclays Bank UK plc [2023] UKSC 25

Court membership
- Judge sitting: Steyn J

Keywords
- Duty of care; Fraud; Payment instruction; Banker-customer relationship

Barclays Bank plc v Quincecare Ltd [1992] 4 All ER 363 is a judicial decision of the High Court of Justice of England and Wales in relation to the banker-customer relationship, and in particular in connection with the bank's duties in relation to payment instructions from a customer's agent or purported agent which give rise, or ought to give rise, to a suspicion of fraud.

Although the decision is cited most frequently in relation to the potential liability of a bank to their customer, in the case itself the bank was a claimant, and the customer and its guarantor were seeking to defend their own liability on the basis of the bank's breach of duty.

The decision attracted much comment, and the duty of banks outlined in the decision has come to be referred to as the Quincecare duty.

Although the case was decided in February 1988, it was not subsequently reported in any of the major law reports until 1992, and even then it was reported solely in the All England Law Reports and none of the official law reports. However the significance of the case was recognised by the judiciary much earlier; shortly after the decision was handed down it was extensively cited with approval by the Court of Appeal in Lipkin Gorman (a Firm) v Karpnale Ltd [1989] 1 WLR 1340 (overturned by the House of Lords on other grounds). However, it was criticised and effectively overruled by the Supreme Court in Philipp v Barclays Bank UK plc [2023] UKSC 25.

== Facts ==
The main facts of the case appear in the judgment. Barclays Bank agreed to lend £400,000 to Quincecare Ltd, a company formed specifically to purchase four chemists shops. The chairman of the company, Mr Harry Stiller, caused a sum of about £340,000 to be drawn down and to be misapplied for his dishonest purposes. Mr Stiller was later sentenced to four years' imprisonment, but almost the entire sum was lost. The bank then sued the company as principal debtor, and its guarantor (a company called UniChem). Both the principal debtor and the guarantor defended the claim, and put forward counterclaims. The central issues related to the question whether the bank acted in breach of duty towards either the principal debtor or the guarantor.

The trial judge, Steyn J summarised the principal issue as follows:

At the risk of oversimplifying, but in order to provide a framework for a sketch of the background, I record at once that the most substantial issue in the case is whether the bank, in executing the order to transfer the money, were put on inquiry that the chairman was acting for his own benefit or, in any event, for an unauthorised purpose.

== Decision ==
The decision of the court was given by Steyn J. Having identified the central issue from the outset, much of the decision was a detailed review of the evidence to consider to what extent the bank knew, or ought to have known, of the fraudulent designs of Quincecare's chairman. This included a review of the dealings of the bank with Mr Stiller, and also consideration of expert evidence of the usual customs and practices of bankers.

Although the company and its guarantor advanced a number of different defences, all of which were addressed in the judgment, the most important aspect of the judgment in terms of jurisprudence was the decision in relation to whether or not the bank was in breach of its duty to its customer by failing to be alive to possible fraud, and the test laid down by the court to be applied. The judgment briefly reviewed the principal authorities, being Selangor United Rubber Estates Ltd v Cradock (No 3) [1968] 1 WLR 1555 and Karak Rubber Co Ltd v Burden (No 2) [1972] 1 WLR 602, and the more recent first instance decision in Lipkin Gorman (a firm) v Karpnale Ltd [1987] 1 WLR 987 (subsequently appealed after the decision in Quincecare was handed down).

In an oft-cited passage, Steyn J held that:

The law should not impose too burdensome an obligation on bankers, which hampers the effective transacting of banking business unnecessarily. On the other hand, the law should guard against the facilitation of fraud, and exact a reasonable standard of care in order to combat fraud and to protect bank customers and innocent third parties. To hold that a bank is only liable when it has displayed a lack of probity would be much too restrictive an approach. On the other hand, to impose liability whenever speculation might suggest dishonesty would impose wholly impractical standards on bankers. In my judgment the sensible compromise, which strikes a fair balance between competing considerations, is simply to say that a banker must refrain from executing an order if and for as long as the banker is 'put on inquiry' in the sense that he has reasonable grounds (although not necessarily proof) for believing that the order is an attempt to misappropriate the funds of the company (see proposition (3) in Lipkin Gorman v Karpnale Ltd (1986) [1992] 4 All ER 331 at 349, [1987] 1 WLR 987 at 1006). And, the external standard of the likely perception of an ordinary prudent banker is the governing one. (emphasis added)

He went on to stress that "trust, not distrust, is also the basis of a bank's dealings with its customers", citing with approval similar comments from Bowen LJ in Sanders Bros v Maclean & Co (1883) 11 QBD 327 at 343.

Accordingly, he dismissed the defences and counterclaims of the defendants and gave judgment for the bank in the amount of the loan, plus interest and costs.

== Authority ==
Until 2023 the decision in Quincecare had been broadly accepted as authoritative ever since it was handed down. It was recognised as authoritative by leading academic texts.

It was cited with approval almost immediately after it was decided by the Court of Appeal in Lipkin Gorman (a Firm) v Karpnale Ltd [1989] 1 WLR 1340, which used to be the leading authority in this area of the law. It has also been cited with approval in various other cases including, Fielding v Royal Bank of Scotland Plc [2004] EWCA Civ 64, Shah v HSBC Private Bank (UK) Ltd [2009] EWHC 79 (QB) and Singularis v Daiwa Capital [2018] EWCA Civ 84.

Despite the consternation the decision caused, since Quincecare was decided there has been only one judicial decision in the United Kingdom where a bank has been held to be liable for breaching the Quincecare duty.

=== Philipp v Barclays Bank ===
Quincecare was considered in a unanimous decision of the Supreme Court, in which Lord Leggatt explained that attempts to extend the so-called Quincecare duty to situations where the customer gives payment instructions directly, instead of via an agent, are misconceived. The bank's obligation is only to carry out its customer's instructions. "It is not for the bank to concern itself with the wisdom or risks of its customer's payment decisions." Where payment instructions are received through an agent, then the bank has to follow the agent's instructions, unless the agent is attempting to defraud the customer, in which case the agent will have no actual authority to act. Even then, the agent will still have apparent authority, unless there are facts apparent to the bank which suggest dishonesty by the agent; only then will the bank have a duty to exercise reasonable skill and care in enquiring into whether the instructions have been given with its customer's authority. The court rejected the notion that Quincecare requires banks to protect customers from their own decisions when they have been tricked into sending money to a fraudster.
