= John Roch =

British judge (1934–2021)

The Right Honourable Sir John Roch

Lord Justice of Appeal
- In office 1993–2000

Justice of the High Court
- In office 1985–1993

Personal details
- Born: John Ormond Roch; 19 April 1934
- Died: 1 December 2021 (aged 87)
- Children: 3
- Education: Wrekin College; Clare College, Cambridge

Sir John Ormond Roch, PC (19 April 1934 – 1 December 2021) was a British judge. He was a Lord Justice of Appeal from 1993 to 2000.

== Early life ==
Roch was born in Cardiff to Frederick Ormond Roch and wife Vera Elizabeth Roch, née Chamberlain, Roch was educated at Wrekin College on a scholarship from Barclays Bank (for whom his father worked) and read law at Clare College, Cambridge (BA, LLB). He studied comparative law in Paris for a year, then served as an officer in the Royal Welch Fusiliers, stationed in British Honduras, for his National Service.

== Career ==
He was called to the Bar by Gray's Inn in 1961, and joined a chambers in Cardiff where he specialised in personal injury claims. Roch took silk in 1976, and was elected a Bencher of Gray's Inn in 1985. He was a Recorder from 1975 to 1985.

Roch was appointed a Justice of the High Court in 1985. Assigned to the Queen's Bench Division, he was a Presiding Judge, Wales and Chester Circuit from 1986 to 1990. He was promoted to the Court of Appeal in 1993 and was sworn of the Privy Council. He was one of the judges who quashed the convictions of the Bridgewater Four in 1997. Roch retired in 2000.

== Personal life ==
He married Anne Greaney in 1967 and they had three daughters; she died in 1994. Roch later married Susan Niccols. Roch died of heart failure in a flat in Broad Haven with his wife on 1 December 2021, at the age of 87.
