= Insurance Law Reform Act 1977 =

Act of Parliament in New Zealand

Insurance Law Reform Act [1977]
- Passed: 29 July 1977
- Commenced: 29 July 1977
- Status: Current legislation

The ‘’’Insurance Law Reform Act [1977]’’' was the first of several such named acts that regulated certain aspects of the insurance industry in New Zealand.

Section 4 and 5 prohibits any insurance claim declined due to any misstatement by the applicant that was not substantially incorrect as well as being not immaterial.

Section 7 prohibits any life policy being declined solely due to any misstatement of age, and where such instances occur, requires the insurance company to readjust the policy as if the correct age had been given.

Section 8 prohibits any compulsory arbitration clause in an insurance contract.
