= Law Reform (Miscellaneous Provisions) Act 1934 =

Act of the Parliament of the United Kingdom

Law Reform (Miscellaneous Provisions) Act 1934 (Note: Section 4(1).)
- Act of Parliament
- Parliament of the United Kingdom
- Long title: An Act to amend the law as to the effect of death in relation to causes of action and as to the awarding of interest in civil proceedings.
- Citation: 24 & 25 Geo. 5. c. 41
- Territorial extent: England and Wales (Note: Section 4(2).)

Dates
- Royal assent: 25 July 1934
- Commencement: 25 July 1934 (Note: The Acts of Parliament (Commencement) Act 1793.)
Other legislation
| Amends | Civil Procedure Act 1833; Administration of Estates Act 1925 |
| Amended by | Limitation Act 1939; Limitation (Enemies and War Prisoner) Act 1945; Statute Law Revision Act 1950; Law Reform (Limitation of Actions, etc.) Act 1954; Carriage by Air Act 1961; Administration of Justice Act 1969; Law Reform (Miscellaneous Provisions) Act 1970; Proceedings Against Estates Act 1970; Fatal Accidents Act 1976; Limitation Act 1980; Administration of Justice Act 1982; Statute Law (Repeals) Act 2004 |

Status: Amended

Text of statute as originally enacted

Revised text of statute as amended

Text of the Law Reform (Miscellaneous Provisions) Act 1934 as in force today (including any amendments) within the United Kingdom, from legislation.gov.uk.

The Law Reform (Miscellaneous Provisions) Act 1934 (24 & 25 Geo. 5. c. 41) is an act of the Parliament of the United Kingdom that amended the law of England and Wales as to the effect of death in relation to causes of action, and as to the awarding of interest in civil proceedings.
