= Law Reform (Miscellaneous Provisions) Act 1971 =

Act of the Parliament of the United Kingdom

Law Reform (Miscellaneous Provisions) Act 1971 (Note: Section 6(1).)
- Act of Parliament
- Parliament of the United Kingdom
- Long title: An Act to extend in certain cases the time limit for bringing legal proceedings where damages are claimed which consist of or include damages for personal injuries or in respect of a person's death, and to amend accordingly the Limitation Act 1963; to provide that in assessing damages for widows in actions arising from the death of their husbands, remarriage and prospects of remarriage shall be left out of account; to repeal section 19 of the Administration of Justice Act 1965; and for purposes connected therewith.
- Citation: 1971 c. 43
- Territorial extent: England and Wales; Scotland; (Note: Section 6(3). Section 5(3) of the act also extended to Northern Ireland, but was repealed by the Fatal Accidents Act 1976.)

Dates
- Royal assent: 1 July 1971
- Commencement: 1 August 1971 (Note: Section 6(2).)

Other legislation
- Amends: Limitation Act 1963; Administration of Justice Act 1965
- Amended by: Northern Ireland Constitution Act 1973; Prescription and Limitation (Scotland) Act 1973; Limitation Act 1975; Fatal Accidents Act 1976

Status: Partially repealed

Text of statute as originally enacted

Revised text of statute as amended

Text of the Law Reform (Miscellaneous Provisions) Act 1971 as in force today (including any amendments) within the United Kingdom, from legislation.gov.uk.

The Law Reform (Miscellaneous Provisions) Act 1971 (c. 43) is an act of the Parliament of the United Kingdom that amended the law on limitation periods for personal injury and fatal accident claims, and provided that the remarriage or prospects of remarriage of a widow shall not be taken into account in assessing her damages, in England and Wales and Scotland.
