= Johan Steyn, Baron Steyn =

South African-British judge and Law Lord (1932–2017)

The Right Honourable The Lord Steyn PC

Lord of Appeal in Ordinary
- In office 11 January 1995 – 1 October 2005
- Monarch: Elizabeth II
- Succeeded by: The Lord Mance

Member of the House of Lords
- Lord Temporal
- Lord of Appeal in Ordinary; 11 January 1995 – 28 November 2017

Personal details
- Born: Johan van Zyl Steyn; 15 August 1932 Stellenbosch, Cape Province, South Africa
- Died: 28 November 2017 (aged 85) London, England, United Kingdom
- Education: University of Stellenbosch; University College, Oxford
- Occupation: Judge
- Profession: Barrister

Johan van Zyl Steyn, Baron Steyn, PC (15 August 1932 – 28 November 2017) was a South African-British judge, until September 2005 a Law Lord. He sat in the House of Lords as a crossbencher.

== Early life and education ==
Steyn was born in Stellenbosch in the Union of South Africa, the son of Janet Lacey Blignaut and Izak van Zyl Steyn, a professor of law at the University of Stellenbosch. His father died before he was three years old and he subsequently were sent to live with his paternal grandparents. He received his schooling at the Hoërskool Jan van Riebeeck in Cape Town where he matriculated in 1950. He studied law at the University of Stellenbosch before reading Law as a Rhodes Scholar at University College, Oxford.

== Career ==
He was called to the Bar in South Africa in 1958 and appointed a Senior Counsel of the Supreme Court of South Africa in 1970.

As a result of his opposition to apartheid in his native South Africa, he settled in the UK in 1973, joining the English Bar and building a distinguished international commercial law practice.

He was appointed Queen's Counsel in 1979 and was appointed a High Court Judge in 1985, receiving the customary knighthood, a surprise appointment by the then Conservative Lord Chancellor Lord Hailsham. He served as presiding judge of the Northern Circuit from 1989 to 1991 and was appointed Lord Justice of Appeal in 1992.

On 11 January 1995 he was elevated to Lord of Appeal in Ordinary and was created a life peer as Baron Steyn, of Swafield in the County of Norfolk. As a Law Lord he achieved prominence for his liberal views and espousal of human rights. He was a fierce critic of Augusto Pinochet's claim to stand immune from prosecution. His record of open criticism of Camp X-Ray at Guantanamo Bay led to pressure from the UK government that he make himself unavailable for the hearing on the indefinite detention of suspects under the Anti-terrorism, Crime and Security Act 2001 that began on 4 October 2004. The decision in the latter case caused the government to review its policy of indefinite detention of terror suspects and led to the equally controversial Terrorism Act 2006. His judicial work in the House of Lords has been instrumental in weaving the Human Rights Act 1998 into the fabric of English law. He also drew upon his background as a commercial lawyer.

His Hart Lecture of May 2000 was influential in its criticism of Pepper (Inspector of Taxes) v Hart, a landmark decision of the House of Lords on the use of legislative history in statutory interpretation.

He was one of the few senior judges to support calls for modernisation of the English legal system and abolition of the role of Lord Chancellor. While a Lord of Appeal he refrained from speaking in the House, instead expressing his views on democracy and human rights through judgments and lectures.

He retired as a Lord of Appeal in Ordinary on 30 September 2005. Jonathan Mance was elevated from Lord Justice of Appeal on 1 October 2005 to replace him. After his retirement he was for a period the chairman of the human rights organisation JUSTICE and was vocal in his criticism of Tony Blair's government and its approach to human rights. He had expressed grave misgivings over the proposed powers to allow detention without trial and about the use of existing anti-terror powers.

== Personal life ==
Steyn married Jean Pollard (1933–2023) in 1958. The couple had four children, Martin, Deon, Linda and Karen Steyn. Their daughter Dame Karen Steyn was appointed a High Court judge in 2019.

After his first marriage ended in divorce in 1976, Steyn married Susan Heard (née Lewis) in 1977.

Steyn had eight grandchildren (from his first marriage) and three stepgrandchildren (from his second marriage).

He died in 2017. On 10 October 2021 as part of the traditional 'Wigs and Mitres Service' lecture at Lincoln's Inn Chapel his ashes were interred there.

== Notable judgments ==
- In re L [1999] 1 AC 458, also called the Bournewood judgment – held that a compliant but incapacitated adult informally admitted to a psychiatric hospital was not detained unlawfully (later contradicted by the European Court of Human Rights)
- R (Jackson) v Attorney General [2006] 1 AC 262 – controversial comments on parliamentary supremacy and its common law foundations (and the possibility for the courts to invalidate unconstitutional statutes)
- MacLean v Arklow Investments Ltd [2000] 1 WLR 594 (Privy Council) – fiduciary duty arising from the purchase of Matakana Island
- Barclays Bank plc v Quincecare Ltd [1992] 4 All ER 363
- R v Secretary of State for the Home Department, ex parte Pierson [1998] AC 539 – the Home Secretary can only impose a harsher punishment than was originally imposed in exceptional circumstances
