= Al Gosaibi =

Al-Gosaibi, Al Gosaibi or Algosaibi (Arabic: القصيبي) is a Peninsular Arabic surname. Notable people with this family name include:

- Ghazi Abdul Rahman Al Gosaibi (1940–2010), Saudi Arabian politician, diplomat and technocrat
- Saud Abdul Aziz Al Gosaibi (1963–2003), Saudi Arabian businessman and managing director of Ahmad Hamad Al Gosaibi & Brothers
- Sulaiman Hamad Al Gosaibi (died 2009), Saudi Arabian businessman
