= Froom v Butcher =

English tort law case

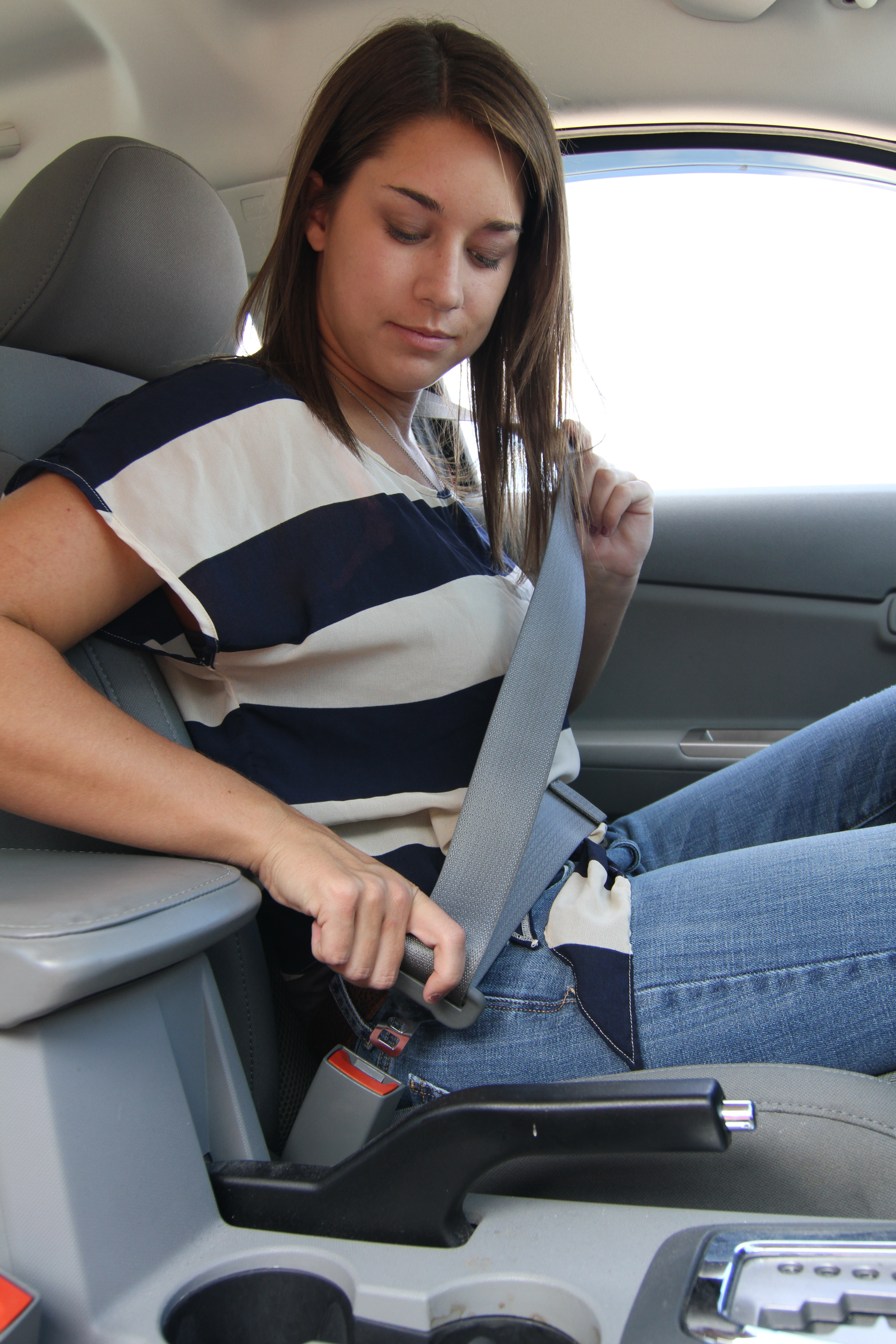
- Court: Court of Appeal
- Citation: [1976] QB 286

Froom v Butcher [1976] QB 286 is an English tort law case, concerning breach of duty.

== Facts ==
The plaintiff did not wear a seat belt. The driver crashed because he was careless. The plaintiff claimed that the driver should pay damages for personal injury.

== Judgment ==
Lord Denning MR said the bad driver cannot say ‘you ought to have been wearing your seat belt’ alone. He held that as a rule of thumb, if the seat belt would have made no difference, there should be no reduction in damages. If it would have made all the difference, then there is 25% contributory negligence. If there would be some difference, then 15%.

== See also ==
- English tort law
