= Law Reform (Limitation of Actions, etc.) Act 1954 =

Act of the Parliament of the United Kingdom

Law Reform (Limitation of Actions, etc.) Act 1954 (Note: Section 8(1).)
- Act of Parliament
- Parliament of the United Kingdom
- Long title: An Act to assimilate, in certain respects and subject to certain exceptions and special provisions, the law applicable to proceedings against public authorities (including the Crown) and persons acting in pursuance or execution or intended execution of enactments to that applicable in other cases; to amend the law as to the time limited for bringing legal proceedings and as to the survival of causes of action against the estates of deceased persons; and for purposes connected with the matters aforesaid.
- Citation: 2 & 3 Eliz. 2. c. 36
- Territorial extent: England and Wales; Scotland; Northern Ireland (in part); (Note: Section 8(2).)

Dates
- Royal assent: 4 June 1954
- Commencement: 4 June 1954 (Note: The Acts of Parliament (Commencement) Act 1793.)
- Repealed: 31 July 1978
Other legislation
Amends	Malicious Damage Act 1812; Malicious Damage (Scotland) Act 1816; Riotous Assemblies (Scotland) Act 1822; Fatal Accidents Act 1846; Public Health (Scotland) Act 1897; Maritime Conventions Act 1911; Law Reform (Miscellaneous Provisions) Act 1934; Limitation Act 1939; Coal Industry Nationalisation Act 1946; New Towns Act 1946; Transport Act 1946; National Health Service (Scotland) Act 1947; Crown Proceedings Act 1947; Electricity Act 1947; Gas Act 1948; Air Corporations Act 1953; Army Act; Air Force Act; See § Repealed enactments
Repeals/revokes	Public Authorities Protection Act 1893
Amended by	Prescription and Limitation (Scotland) Act 1973; Statute Law (Repeals) Act 1974; Statute Law (Repeals) Act 1976
Repealed by	Statute Law (Repeals) Act 1978

Status: Repealed

Text of statute as originally enacted

The Law Reform (Limitation of Actions, etc.) Act 1954 (2 & 3 Eliz. 2. c. 36) was an act of the Parliament of the United Kingdom that amended the law of limitation of actions in England and Wales and Scotland, bringing the limitation period applicable to proceedings against public authorities and the Crown into line with that applicable in other cases, and making further amendments to the law on limitation of actions and the survival of causes of action against the estates of deceased persons.

== Provisions ==
=== Repealed enactments ===
Section 8(3) of the act repealed 17 enactments, listed in the schedule to the act.

Citation	Short title	Extent of repeal
52 Geo. 3. c. 130	Malicious Damage Act 1812	In section four, from the words "Provided also that" to the words "after such offence shall be committed".
56 Geo. 3. c. 125	Malicious Damage (Scotland) Act 1816	In section three, from the words "Provided also that" to the words "after such offence shall be committed".
3 Geo. 4. c. 33	Riotous Assemblies (Scotland) Act 1822	Section fifteen.
44 & 45 Vict. c. 58	Army Act 1881	Subsections (1) and (2) of section one hundred and seventy.
56 & 57 Vict. c. 61	Public Authorities Protection Act 1893	The whole act.
60 & 61 Vict. c. 38	Public Health (Scotland) Act 1897	In section one hundred and sixty-six, from the words "and every action" to the words "shall have arisen".
7 & 8 Geo. 5. c. 51	Air Force (Constitution) Act 1917	Subsections (1) and (2) of section one hundred and seventy.
24 & 25 Geo. 5. c. 41	Law Reform (Miscellaneous Provisions) Act 1934	In paragraph (5) of subsection (3) of section one, the words "the cause of action arose not earlier than six months before his death and".
2 & 3 Geo. 6. c. 21	Limitation Act 1939	Section twenty-one; in section twenty-two, the words "or in the case of actions to which the last foregoing section applies, one year" and paragraph (d) of the proviso; and the proviso to section thirty-two.
9 & 10 Geo. 6. c. 59	Coal Industry Nationalisation Act 1946	Subsections (1) and (2) of section forty-nine.
9 & 10 Geo. 6. c. 68	New Towns Act 1946	Section seventeen.
10 & 11 Geo. 6. c. 27	National Health Service (Scotland) Act 1947	In section seventy, paragraph (b).
10 & 11 Geo. 6. c. 44	Crown Proceedings Act 1947	In subsection (1) of section thirty, from the words "except in the case of" to the words "the service of the Post Office"; subsection (2) of that section; and section forty-eight.
10 & 11 Geo. 6. c. 49	Transport Act 1947	Section eleven.
10 & 11 Geo. 6. c. 54	Electricity Act 1947	Section twelve.
11 & 12 Geo. 6. c. 67	Gas Act 1948	Section fourteen.
2 & 3 Eliz. 2. c. 7	Air Corporations Act 1953	Section three.

== Subsequent developments ==
Section 6 of the act, which contained provisions relating to Scotland, was repealed by section 16 of, and part II of schedule 5 to, the Prescription and Limitation (Scotland) Act 1973, which came into force on 25 July 1973.

Sections 1, 5(2) and 8(3) of, and the schedule to, the act were repealed by section 1 of, and part XI of the schedule to, the Statute Law (Repeals) Act 1974, which came into force on 27 June 1974.

Sections 5 and 7 of the act, and section 8(2) except the words "this Act extends to Great Britain only" were repealed by section 1(1) of, and part I of schedule 1 to, the Statute Law (Repeals) Act 1976, which came into force on 27 May 1976.

The whole act was repealed by section 1(1) of, and part I of schedule 1 to, the Statute Law (Repeals) Act 1978, which came into force on 31 July 1978.
