= Boys v Chaplin =

- Court: House of Lords
- Full case name: David Boys v Richard Chaplin
- Citations: [1971] AC 356 [1969] 2 All ER 1085

Case history
- Prior action: [1967] EWCA Civ 3

Court membership
- Judges sitting: Lord Denning, Lord Upjohn, and Kenneth Diplock, Baron Diplock

Keywords
- Conflict of laws; double actionability; choice of law in tort

Boys v Chaplin [1971] AC 356 is a leading conflict of laws case decided by the House of Lords.

== Facts ==
The plaintiff, a passenger on a motorcycle, was injured through the negligence of the defendant whose car had hit the motorcycle. The plaintiff and defendant were British soldiers stationed in Malta. David Boys was run into by a motor car driven by Richard Chaplin. He was serving in the Royal Naval Air Squadron and was also stationed in Malta at the time.

David Boys was badly injured. He had a fractured skull and was unconscious for three days. The right side of his face was crushed. He was taken to the Royal Naval Hospital in Malta. He was there for about six weeks. Then, he was brought back to England on 19 September 1963 and taken to the Royal Air Force Hospital at Wroughton, Wiltshire.

He was there for over six months, until 7 April 1964. Then, he was an out-patient for two months. Eventually, on 5 June 1964, owing to his injuries, he was discharged from the Royal Air Force. He was wholly and permanently deaf in one ear and his sense of balance was substantially impaired. The right side of his face is partially paralysed, and he suffers much from headaches. Nevertheless, he was able to do good work. Soon after his discharge, he found employment as an electronics engineer at a good wage, and it was unlikely that he will suffer any loss of earnings in the future on account of this accident.

The driver of the car, Richard Chaplin, wa also back in England and was stationed in Culdrose, Cornwall. In August 1965, David Boys was given legal aid to sue Richard Chaplin and issued a writ claiming damages.

== Judgment ==
The Court modified the test in Phillips v Eyre on whether a court can assume jurisdiction over a tort that occurred in another country by requiring "double actionability". Originally, the subject matter had to be actionable in both the foreign and the local jurisdiction. However, Boys v Chaplin stated that it had to be "civilly actionable" only under the law of the forum, where the lex fori had a much closer connection with the dispute, the lex loci delicti limb of the "double actionability" rule could be disapplied.

Dicey & Morris, in relation to the flexible exception, states: "a particular issue between the parties... may be governed by the law of the country which, in respect to that issue, has the most significant relationship with the occurrence and the parties"

This exception was furthered in Red Sea Insurance v Bouygues SA [1995] 1 AC 190 which provided that exception can displace either the law of the forum or the law of the tort such that a tort may be actionable even though it is not actionable under the lex fori or lex loci delicti.

== See also ==
- List of House of Lords cases
- Red Sea Insurance Co Ltd v Bouygues SA [1995] 1 AC 190
