= Double actionability =

Doctrine of private international law

Double actionability is a doctrine of private international law which holds that an action for an alleged tort committed in a foreign jurisdiction can be successful in a domestic court only if it would be actionable under both the laws of the home jurisdiction and the foreign jurisdiction. The rule originated in the controversial case of Phillips v Eyre (1870) LR 6 QB 1.

The rule is no longer used in Canadian law and instead the lex loci delicti rule is used. Likewise, the rule no longer forms part of Australian law which also uses the lex loci delicti rule. This rule holds that the applicable law for a tort committed in a foreign place will be the tort law of the foreign place.

The rule was abolished in New Zealand tort law by section 10 of the Private International Law (Choice of Law in Tort) Act 2017.

The rule has largely been abandoned in English law by virtue of section 10 of the Private International Law (Miscellaneous Provisions) Act 1995, although defamation claims are specifically excluded (cf. section 13(1)). However, even prior to it being abandoned the courts had increasingly distanced themselves from the rule by applying a "flexible exception". The exception was first applied in Boys v Chaplin [1969] 2 All ER 1085 and expanded upon in Red Sea Insurance v Bouygues SA [1995] 1 AC 190.
