= Private International Law (Miscellaneous Provisions) Act 1995 =

Act of the Parliament of the United Kingdom

Private International Law (Miscellaneous Provisions) Act 1995 (Note: Section 19.)
- Act of Parliament
- Parliament of the United Kingdom
- Long title: An Act to make provision about interest on judgment debts and arbitral awards expressed in a currency other than sterling; to make further provision as to marriages entered into by unmarried persons under a law which permits polygamy; to make provision for choice of law rules in tort and delict; and for connected purposes.
- Citation: 1995 c. 42
- Territorial extent: England and Wales; Scotland; Northern Ireland; (Note: Section 18.)

Dates
- Royal assent: 8 November 1995
- Commencement: various (Note: Section 16.)
Other legislation
Amends	Crown Proceedings Act 1947; Arbitration Act 1950; Administration of Justice Act 1970; Matrimonial Proceedings (Polygamous Marriages) Act 1972; Matrimonial Causes Act 1973; Matrimonial Homes Act 1983; County Courts Act 1984; Agricultural Holdings Act 1986; Social Security Contributions and Benefits Act 1992; Drug Trafficking Act 1994
Amended by	Arbitration Act 1996; Family Law Act 1996; Proceeds of Crime Act 2002; Regulatory Reform (Agricultural Tenancies) (England and Wales) Order 2006; Law Applicable to Non-Contractual Obligations (England and Wales and Northern Ireland) Regulations 2008; Retained EU Law (Revocation and Reform) Act 2023 (Consequential Amendment) Regulations 2023

Status: Amended

Text of statute as originally enacted

Revised text of statute as amended

Text of the Private International Law (Miscellaneous Provisions) Act 1995 as in force today (including any amendments) within the United Kingdom, from legislation.gov.uk.

The Private International Law (Miscellaneous Provisions) Act 1995 (c. 42) is an act of the Parliament of the United Kingdom.

The act is made up of several parts. The three principal parts regulate:

- Interest on judgment debts and arbitral awards
- Validity of marriages under a law which permits polygamy
- Choice of law in tort and delict

== Interest ==
The first part inserts a new provision into the Administration of Justice Act 1970 and the County Courts Act 1984 permitting interest to be awarded by the courts on judgments issued in a currency other than sterling, and then updates the relevant section which relate to equivalent provisions in the Arbitration Act 1950 for arbitration awards.

== Polygamous marriages ==
Section 5(1) affirms that:

A marriage entered into outside England and Wales between parties neither of whom is already married is not void under the law of England and Wales on the ground that it is entered into under a law which permits polygamy and that either party is domiciled in England and Wales.

Section 6 gives the section retroactive effect, and section 7 applies equivalent provisions to Scotland.

Section 8(1) confirms that "Nothing in this Part affects any law or custom relating to the marriage of members of the Royal Family."

== Choice of law in tort ==
Part III regulates choice of law for tort and delict. Section 9(2) states "The characterisation for the purposes of private international law of issues arising in a claim as issues relating to tort or delict is a matter for the courts of the forum", which replicates the common law position in relation to that issue.

Section 10 abrogates the common law rule on double actionability from the case of Phillips v Eyre (1870) LR 6 QB 1.

Section 11 lays down the new rule, that the choice of law for tort and delict shall be the lex loci delicti commissi ("place where the wrong occurred"). Subsection (2) clarifies that where the tort occurs across different countries:

- in relation to personal injury or death resulting from personal injury, it is the law of the country where the individual was when he sustained the injury;
- in relation to damage to property, it is the law of the country where the property was when it was damaged; and
- in any other case, it is the law of the country in which the most significant element or elements of those events occurred.

Section 12 creates a "flexible exception" where the tort is overwhelmingly more connected with another country to that indicated by section 11.

Section 13 creates a general exception for libel and slander. Defamation continues to be regulated by the common law rules and still requires double actionability. This was felt necessary to protect British newspapers from being sued under draconian defamation laws overseas.
