= Mental capacity in England and Wales =

In the law of England and Wales, best interest decisions are decisions made on behalf of people who do not have the mental capacity to make them for themselves at the time the decision needs to be taken. Someone who has the capacity to make a decision is said to be "capacitous". Since 2007, there has been a dedicated court with jurisdiction over mental capacity: the Court of Protection, although it mostly deals with adults. Most applications to make decisions on behalf of a child are still dealt with by the Family Court.

In a medical emergency, the patient may be obviously incapable of making a decision because they are unconscious and treatment cannot be put off. In that case an attempt to give treatment will be lawful if the person giving the treatment believes it is in the patient's best interest.

Where there is doubt about someone's capacity to make a decision but their capacity may improve later, the decision should be deferred if possible. People who experience delirium or altered states of consciousness, such as during a urinary tract infection, can temporarily lose capacity. If the person's capacity is unlikely to improve in the future—such as people who have relatively severe dementia, certain kinds of brain injury, or a serious learning disability—a mental capacity assessment should be conducted. Mental capacity assessments are specific to each decision, so if a different decision is needed, the person's capacity may need to be assessed again. For example, a person might be able to make a decision about their care or treatment but lack the capacity to make a financial decision.

Outside an emergency situation, the decision maker should normally take reasonable steps to consult other relevant people (such as the person's next of kin, other relatives, friends or associates) before making a decision on their behalf. If the decision is complex or fraught and will have reasonably serious consequences, an independent advocate should be appointed.

== Mental capacity ==
=== Key principles ===
As of 2025, the main legal framework governing mental capacity in adults is set out in the Mental Capacity Act 2005. The key principles are:-

1. A person must be assumed to have capacity unless it is established that he/she lacks capacity.

2. A person is not to be treated as unable to make a decision unless all practicable steps to help him/her to do so have been taken without success.

3. A person is not to be treated as unable to make a decision merely because he/she makes an unwise decision.

4. An act done, or decision made, under this Act for or on behalf of a person who lacks capacity must be done, or made, in his/ her best interests.

5. Before the act is done, or the decision is made, regard must be had to whether the purpose for which it is needed can be as effectively achieved in a way that is less restrictive of the person's rights and freedom of action.

=== Mental capacity assessments ===
A diagnosis of (for example) dementia, or a learning difficulty, does not necessarily mean the person lacks capacity. A mental capacity assessment should take place when there is an impairment of, or disturbance in the functioning of a person's mind or brain and a decision that needs to be made. The mental capacity assessment checks whether a person can:-

- Understand the information they are given;
- Retain that information for long enough to make a decision;
- Weigh up the information; and
- Communicate their decision.

This assessment is made on the balance of probabilities. The person has capacity if they can do all four of these things, and lacks capacity if they cannot do at least one of them. A mental capacity assessment in respect of a lower-level day-to-day decision may be made by a carer or relative and need not be formally recorded, but capacity assessments about decisions that are complex or have important ramifications for the person are made by social workers, doctors or multi-disciplinary teams on behalf of local authorities and clinical commissioning groups, who have a lead role in implementing the Mental Capacity Act and are required to keep formal records.

== Best interest decisions ==
The decision made in a person's best interests should be the best decision for them. Best interest decisions should promote the person's welfare while respecting their rights, their wishes and feelings, and their freedom. Where there is more than one option that could potentially be in the person's best interests, the decision maker should choose the one that least constrains their liberty ("least restrictive option"). Best interest decisions should not be for the convenience of the person's carers or the decision-maker.

The law assumes that carers and relatives will be able to make lower-level, day-to-day best interest decisions for a person lacking capacity. Generally speaking, a decision would need to involve a social worker or doctor if there is potential disagreement about capacity or what is in the person's best interest, if potentially life-affecting medical treatment is being considered, if abuse or crime is suspected, if significant amounts of money are involved, or if other people might be at risk.

=== Deputies ===
In some circumstances the Court of Protection can grant a deputyship. Deputies may be trusts or people, and if people must be aged 18 or over. They must consent to act as deputy. Once appointed they can make decisions on behalf of the person without capacity, should be consulted on decisions they do not make, and must report to the Office of the Public Guardian (OPG).

=== Advance decisions ===
An advance decision is made when a capacitous adult gives directions about future decisions that might need to be taken when they are not capacitous. If the advance decision is to refuse a particular treatment, then for the most part that treatment may not be given to them. Advance decisions may be withdrawn at any time while the person has capacity. Unless the person specifies otherwise, their advance decision overrules any decision made by someone with lasting power of attorney.

Advance decisions can only be used to refuse a life-sustaining treatment if the decision is in writing, signed and witnessed, and specifically says it relates to life-sustaining treatments.

=== Life-sustaining treatment ===
Best interests typically, but not always, require that the person is given the best life-sustaining treatment available.

The authorities are all agreed that the starting point is a strong presumption that it is in a person's best interests to stay alive. As Sir Thomas Bingham MR said in the Court of Appeal in Bland, at p 808, "A profound respect for the sanctity of human life is embedded in our law and our moral philosophy". Nevertheless, they are also all agreed that this is not an absolute. There are cases where it will not be in a patient's best interests to receive life-sustaining treatment.

— Lady Hale

==== Do not resuscitate ====
Do not resuscitate (DNR) orders, which are also known as "Do not attempt resuscitation (DNAR)" or "Do not attempt CPR", are decisions made by doctors in a patient's best interests. They are used when the likelihood of success is low and the likelihood of harm is substantial; when CPR might prolong or increase suffering; or if a capacitous patient decides that CPR should not be attempted. There is a presumption that CPR will be attempted unless a DNR is in force.

== Power of Attorney ==
A power of attorney is created when a person appoints someone else as their attorney to make decisions on their behalf. The person making the appointment is called the "donor" and the person receiving it is called the "attorney".

An ordinary power of attorney is made by a person who is capacitous, and only lasts while they continue to have capacity. More usually, a power of attorney can be made when the person is capacitous that continues after they lose capacity. The current form is called a lasting power of attorney. It replaces the former enduring power of attorney. (No new enduring powers of attorney can be created, but those that were created before 1 October 2007 can still be registered.)

Enduring power of attorney only applies to the person's finances. The more modern and robust lasting power of attorney can apply either to financial decisions, or health and welfare decisions, or both, depending on what the donor chooses when they set it up.

=== Health & Welfare ===
Someone with lasting power of attorney for health and welfare can make decisions about where the donor should live (e.g. in their own home or in a care home of the attorney's choice), what medical care the donor should receive, what activities they should take part in, and with which people they can have social contact.

=== Finances ===
Someone with lasting power of attorney for finances, or someone with enduring power of attorney, can make decisions about the donor's money such as paying bills on the person's behalf, investing their money, or buying and selling property. The attorney needs to keep accounts of the donor's money separately from their own household accounts.

=== Registration and revocation ===
Powers of attorney can be registered via a solicitor or directly with the Office of the Public Guardian. There is an application fee. If someone already has power of attorney, but the donor wants to change it, then the donor needs to contact the OPG.

== Children ==
Most parents can make most decisions for their minor children, unless the Family Court decides otherwise. Each Local Authority also has a general duty to safeguard and promote the welfare of children who live in its ambit, and must provide for those children who would not otherwise have adequate accommodation and care. A police constable also has powers to remove children from their parents without a Court Order for up to 72 hours.

=== Gillick competence ===
Children are said to be Gillick competent when they are capable of making some kinds of independent decision. The terminology comes from Gillick v West Norfolk AHA [1985] UKHL 7.

As a matter of Law the parental right to determine whether or not their minor child below the age of sixteen will have medical treatment terminates if and when the child achieves sufficient understanding and intelligence to understand fully what is proposed.

— Lord Scarman

=== Fraser guidelines ===
The Fraser guidelines come from Lord Fraser's remarks in the same case. They apply specifically to a doctor giving contraceptive advice and medicine to a girl under 16. A doctor can do so:-

"provided he is satisfied in the following criteria:

- That the girl (although under the age of 16 years of age) will understand his advice;
- That he cannot persuade her to inform her parents or to allow him to inform the parents that she is seeking contraceptive advice;
- That she is very likely to continue having sexual intercourse with or without contraceptive treatment;
- That unless she receives contraceptive advice or treatment her physical or mental health or both are likely to suffer;
- That her best interests require him to give her contraceptive advice, treatment or both without the parental consent."

— Lord Fraser

== Deprivation of Liberty Safeguards ==
General resource here

- European Court of Human Rights decision in R v Bournewood Community and Mental Health NHS Trust and HL v United Kingdom (2004) 40 EHRR 761: UK law at that time was in breach of article 5(1) of the Convention for the Protection of Human Rights and Fundamental Freedoms.
- Outcome was Mental Health Act 2007 and invention of DoLS

=== Children ===
- D (A Child; deprivation of liberty), Re (2015) EWHC 922 (Fam)

overruled by

- In the matter of D (A Child), (2019) UKSC 42

=== Cheshire West ===
- Supreme Court decision the literature calls Cheshire West: An individual is deprived of their liberty if all three of the following are met:-

- Lack the capacity to consent to their care/treatment arrangements
- Are under continuous supervision and control
- Are not free to leave

- These are true irrespective of whether the person is compliant, i.e. they do not need to object—DoLS still applies to people who seem happy to be deprived of their liberty.
- This decision caused considerable dismay among the local authorities and NHS trusts as it implies much more bureaucracy and much higher costs than the previous understanding of the law.

=== Future ===
- Mental Capacity (Amendment) Bill 2019, which passed into law in May 2019 and will replace the DoLS with a new Liberty Protection Safeguards (LPS) system. The ultimate aim is to streamline the process. The LPS will apply to those 16 and above unlike the DoLS which was specifically for 18+. The initial plan was for implementation in October 2020. It was announced by Helen Whately, Minister for Care in July 2020 that the implementation would be delayed, with full implementation expected by April 2022. Some of this delay was due to the Coronavirus disease 2019 pandemic. During this period a draft Code of practice will be produced which will go out to Public consultation. On 4 April 23 a further delay was announced by the government stating any implementation is likely to be beyond the life of this Parliament.

== History ==
- Madhouses Act 1774
- Lunacy Act 1845
- Idiots Act 1886
- Mental Deficiency Act 1913
- Mental Deficiency Act 1927
- Mental Treatment Act 1930
- Mental Health Act 1959
- Mental Health Act 1983
- In re F (Mental Patient: Sterilisation) (1990) 2 AC 1 (here), paragraph 1:- "... no court now has jurisdiction either by statute or derived from the Crown as parens patriae to give or withhold consent to such an operation in the case of an adult as it would in wardship proceedings in the case of a minor."

== Notes ==
=== Sources ===
Mental Capacity Act 2005 Code of Practice (PDF), Department for Constitutional Affairs, 2007

MCA (2005), The Mental Capacity Act 2005, The National Archives

Aintree University Hospitals NHS Foundation Trust v James, British and Irish Legal Information Institute, 2013

Joint statement (2017), Decisions relating to Cardiopulmonary Resuscitation (3rd edition—1st revision), The British Medical Association, the Resuscitation Council (UK), and the Royal College of Nursing

Williams, V; Boyle, G; Jepson, M; Swift, P; Williamson, T; Heslop, P (2012), Making Best Interest Decisions: People and Process, Policy Research Programme, Department of Health

CQC (2011), The Mental Capacity Act 2005: Guidance for Providers (PDF), Care Quality Commission

OPG (2017), Make, register or end a lasting power of attorney, HM Government

Age UK (2017), Powers of Attorney, Age UK

NSPCC (2017), A child's legal rights: Gillick competency and Fraser guidelines, NSPCC

Gillick v West Norfolk and Wisbech AHA, British and Irish Legal Information Institute, 1986
