= Royal Free NHS Foundation Trust v EF & Ors =

2025 British legal case

- Court: Court of Protection
- Full case name: Royal Free NHS Foundation Trust (Applicant) v EF (by his litigation friend the Official Solicitor), NN, and The London Borough of Barnet (Respondents)
- Decided: 19 December 2025
- Citation: [2025] EWCOP 52 (T3)

Court membership
- Judge sitting: McKendrick J

Keywords
- Mental capacity, best interests, residence

Royal Free NHS Foundation Trust v EF & Ors [2025] EWCOP 52 is a UK Court of Protection case concerning mental capacity.

== Facts ==
EF was a 44-year-old man with Down syndrome who did not have capacity to consent to medical treatment. EF also lacked capacity to take part in court proceedings, so he was represented by the Official Solicitor. He needed medication to manage his body chemistry and kidney dialysis three times a week, but had missed or cut short many dialysis sessions, putting him at risk of many complications including, potentially, sudden death.

NN was EF's father and main carer. He was also dealing with the death of his wife, EF's mother, and his own personal bankruptcy. He had an entrenched distrust of medical professionals and his position was that kidney dialysis was unnecessary.

Court proceedings in 2024 and 2025 led to court orders under section 16 (5) of the Mental Capacity Act 2005 that NN must convey or allow to be conveyed EF to his three times a week kidney dialysis appointments; help and encourage EF to take his medication; and not interfere in or obstruct various aspects of his care. NN did not comply with these orders.

In this case the Official Solicitor and the Local Authority jointly sought the Court's approval firstly to remove EF from his father's care, secondly to place EF in supported accommodation, and thirdly, to deprive EF of his liberty. The Royal Free NHS Foundation Trust, needing to maintain a relationship with EF and his next of kin in order to provide life-sustaining treatment, did not actively seek to remove EF from his father's care.

== Law ==
This was a best interest decision.

== Judgment ==
The Court agreed that EF should be removed from NN's care, placed in supported accommodation, and deprived of his liberty.
