= Gillick v West Norfolk and Wisbech Area Health Authority =

1985 British legal case

- Court: House of Lords
- Decided: 20 December 1985
- Citation: [1985] UKHL 7

Court membership
- Judges sitting: Lord Fraser of Tullybelton; Lord Scarman; Lord Brandon of Oakbrook; Lord Bridge of Harwich; Lord Templeman

Keywords
- Minors; consent; mental capacity

Gillick v West Norfolk and Wisbech Area Health Authority [1985] UKHL 7 is a House of Lords case about mental capacity in England and Wales.

== Facts ==
Mrs Gillick was a Roman Catholic who had four daughters under the age of 16, and gave birth to a fifth daughter during the course of the litigation. She asked the local health authority for its assurance that her daughters would not be given contraceptive advice. The local authority replied that it would be unusual for a minor to be given contraceptive advice without her parents' consent, but the decision ultimately rested with the advising doctor. Mrs Gillick wrote to the health authority seeking to forbid them from giving contraceptive advice to her daughters until they were of age. The health authority did not change its view and Mrs Gillick brought court proceedings. She sought a declaration that it would be unlawful for a doctor to give contraceptive advice to her underage children without her consent.

== Law ==
Section 8 of the Family Law Reform Act 1969 reads as follows:

(1) The consent of a minor who has attained the age of 16 years to any surgical, medical or dental treatment which, in the absence of consent, would constitute a trespass to his person, shall be as effective as it would be if he were of full age; and where a minor has by virtue of this section given an effective consent to any treatment it shall not be necessary to obtain any consent for it from his parent or guardian.

(2) In this section ‘surgical, medical or dental treatment’ includes any procedure undertaken for the purposes of diagnosis, and this section applies to any procedure (including, in particular, the administration of an anaesthetic) which is ancillary to any treatment as it applies to that treatment.

(3) Nothing in this section shall be construed as making ineffective any consent which would have been effective if this section had not been enacted.

== Courts below ==
The courts below declined to grant the declaration Mrs Gillick sought.

== Judgment ==
At issue were two questions:

1. Can a minor give valid consent to medical treatment without their parent's knowledge or consent?
2. If a doctor gives advice or prescribes medication to a minor, are they necessarily aiding and abetting a sexual offence?

By 3 to 2 (with Lords Brandon and Templeman dissenting), the court found in favour of the health authority.

== Significance ==
The judgment includes what came to be known as the Fraser Guidelines.

When a medical professional is deciding whether to give contraceptive advice to an underage person without the patient's parents' consent, the professional must satisfy themself that:

1. The young person will understand the professional's advice;
2. The young person cannot be persuaded to inform their parents;
3. The young person is likely to begin, or to continue having, sexual intercourse with or without contraceptive treatment;
4. Unless the young person receives contraceptive treatment, their physical or mental health, or both, are likely to suffer; and
5. The young person's best interests require them to receive contraceptive advice or treatment with or without parental consent.

== See also ==
- Mental capacity in England and Wales
- Gillick competence
