= Enduring power of attorney =

Authorisation under English law to act on someone else's behalf

An enduring power of attorney (EPA) under English law is a legal authorisation to act on someone else's behalf in legal and financial matters which (unlike other kinds of power of attorney) can continue in force after the person granting it loses mental capacity, and so can be used to manage the affairs of people who have lost the ability to deal with their own affairs, without the need to apply to the Court of Protection.

EPA's were created by the Enduring Powers of Attorney Act 1985. It soon became apparent that the law relating to mental incapacity remained inadequate and between 1991 and 1993 the Law Commission published a series of consultation documents. In 1995 it published a report Mental Incapacity which recommended the abolition of EPAs, noting that they could not handle health or welfare issues and assumed that a person either had mental capacity or did not. No provision existed for a partial intervention in a person’s affairs where the person concerned had partial or fluctuating capacity.

The Law Commission proposed the introduction of Continuing Powers of Attorney (CPAs). These were subsequently enacted by the Mental Capacity Act 2005 as Lasting Powers of Attorney (LPAs). The Mental Capacity Act 2005 came into force on 1 October 2007 and no new EPAs can now be drawn up; however, one signed before that date remains valid and may still be registered with the Office of the Public Guardian. This is required when the donor begins to lose mental capacity. Unlike an LPA, an EPA can be used without registration for so long as the donor has mental capacity.

An EPA gives the person appointed as attorney the power to dispose of property, deal with financial affairs, sign documents and make purchases on behalf of the individual and make usual gifts. The attorney does not have the power to make substantial or unusual gifts, or make decisions about personal care and welfare.
