= Murray v United Kingdom =

Murray v United Kingdom was a legal case heard by the European Court of Human Rights in 1994 to determine if part of the United Kingdom's anti-terrorism laws were in violation of the Convention for the Protection of Human Rights and Fundamental Freedoms.

The case was referred to the Court on 7 April 1993 from an application lodged on 28 September 1988 relating to events occurring in 1982. The case was heard in the Human Rights Building, Strasbourg, on 24 January 1994 and the Chamber delivered their judgement on 28 October 1994.

The applicants were six Irish citizens, all members of the same family: Margaret Murray, Thomas Murray, Mark Murray, Allana Murray, Michaela Murray and Rosena Murray.

In June 1982 two brothers of Margaret Murray were convicted in the United States in connection with the supplying of weapons to the Provisional Irish Republican Army (PIRA). Mrs Murray, her husband Thomas, and their four children were then residing in Belfast.

On the morning of 26 July, Margaret Murray was taken into custody by the Army on suspicion of fund-raising for the Provisional IRA in connection with her brothers' activities and taken to the Springfield Road screening centre. The style and procedure of her arrest was under section 14 of the Northern Ireland (Emergency Provisions) Act 1978, her suspected offences were contained with section 21 of the act and also section 10 of the Prevention of Terrorism (Temporary Provisions) Act 1976.

At Springfield Road, Mrs Murray gave her name but refused to answer any other questions and she also declined to be photographed or to submit to an examination by a medical orderly. She sat through two short interviews and was also photographed without her knowledge or consent. She was released after two hours without being charged; the "screening proforma" record form did not list any offence.

On 9 February 1984 Mrs Murray brought an action before the High Court against the Ministry of Defence for false imprisonment and other torts, arguing that her arrest and detention were illegal on a number of grounds - notably that they had been without genuine suspicion that she had committed an offence or any genuine intention to question her, it had been a "fishing expedition" for improper purposes. In his judgment of 25 October 1985 the judge dismissed all the plaintiff's arguments. Mrs Murray took her case to the Court of Appeal, which unanimously rejected her claims on 20 February 1987. The case was appealed to the House of Lords – on the manner of the arrest, the use of the screening proforma, and the length of detention – and was unanimously rejected on 25 May 1988.

The Murrays applied to the ECHR, as previously noted, in 1988. Mrs Murray stating that her arrest and detention were a violation of Article 5 (paragraphs 1, 2 and 5) and that the photograph and record taking was in breach of Article 8. Her family also applied under the same parts of Article 5 because they had been required to assemble in a single room of their house while Mrs Murray prepared to leave with the Army. They also applied under Article 8 in regard to the recording and retention of personal details. The entire family also applied that under Article 8 regarding the entry and visual search of their home and under Article 13 that no effective remedies existed under domestic law.

In February 1993 the Commission supported the Murrays' application in part. There had been a violation of Article 5, but no violation of Article 8, or of Article 13 in regard to the entry and search, or the taking and keeping of a photograph and personal details, or concerning the lack of remedies in domestic law. The case went to a public hearing on 24 January 1994.

At the hearing the Court gave significant weight to the need for a democratic society to protect itself against the threat of organised terrorism and to the problems involved in the arrest and detention of persons suspected of terrorist-linked offences.

The Court dismissed Mrs Murray's claims against her arrest and detention under 5(1)(c); dismissed her contention that she had not been informed promptly of the reasons for the arrest and of any charge (5(2)). Since there had been no violation of 5(1) or 5(2) in the Court's opinion there could be no consideration of 5(5). The Court decided that there had been no violation of Article 8 as the Army's action had been in accordance with the law, as contained in paragraph two of the Article, and had not been disproportionate to the aim pursued. The Court dismissed the Murrays' claims of a violation of Article 13.

The Court's decisions were by majority – 14–4 in regard of Article 5(1), 13–5 in regard of Article 5(2), 13–5 in regard of Article 5(5), 15–3 in regard of Article 8, and unanimous in regard of Article 13.
