= Denial of medical care =

Denial of medical care or refusal of medical care may refer to:

- Failure to provide medical treatment: the refusal to provide healthcare to a patient who requires it
- Refusal of medical assistance: a patient's voluntary refusal to receive medical care
