= Biddy Macfarlane =

English lawyer (1930–2019)

Anne Bridget "Biddy" Macfarlane (née Griffiths, 26 January 1930 – 24 November 2019) was an English lawyer. She was the first female County Court registrar in England, the first woman and first solicitor to be appointed master of the Court of Protection and was an honorary member of the Law Society of England and Wales for life.

== Biography ==
Macfarlane was born Anne Bridget "Biddy" Griffiths on 26 January 1930 in Paddington, London, and had five siblings. Her parents were doctors David Griffith and Grace Griffith (née Gulston). During World War II, she was evacuated to the United States, and attended school both in the US and the UK.

Macfarlane studied law at the University of Bristol, where she met her future husband James Macfarlane. When she qualified in 1954, Macfarlane was one of only two female solicitors in Bristol. She was the first female County Court registrar after her appointment as Registrar of Bromley County Court in 1978. She was also the first woman and first solicitor to be appointed master of the Court of Protection.

Macfarlane was a member of the Child Poverty Action Group (CPAG) for 38 years. She retired in 1995, and was made an honorary member of the Law Society of England and Wales for life.

Macfarlane died from pneumonia on 24 November 2019, aged 89.
