= Emancipation of minors =

Concept of family law

Emancipation of minors is a legal mechanism by which a minor before attaining the age of majority is freed from control by their parents or guardians, and the parents or guardians are freed from the responsibility of the minor. Minors are normally considered legally incompetent to enter into contracts and to handle their own affairs. Emancipation overrides that presumption and allows emancipated children to legally make certain decisions on their own behalf.

Depending on jurisdiction, a child may be emancipated by acts such as child marriage, attaining economic self-sufficiency, obtaining an educational degree or diploma, or military service. In the United States, all states have some form of emancipation of minors.

Even without a court proceeding, some jurisdictions will find a minor to be emancipated for purposes of making a decision in the absence of the minor's parents or guardians. For example, a child in most jurisdictions can enter into a binding contract to procure their own basic needs. However, when a child's needs are not provided by a parent, the child is often deemed a ward of the state and receives a court-appointed guardian.

== History ==
In Roman law the father of the extended household, the pater familias, exercised autocratic authority through patria potestas including his wife, his children and his slaves. Such rights persisted through feudal and English common law, assigning most people the status of personal property (chattel). In common law, emancipation is the freeing of someone from this control. It grants the emancipated the ability to legally engage in civil actions, and frees the former owner of liability.

In common-law jurisdictions, chattel slavery was abolished during the 19th century and married women were given independent rights during the 19th and at the start of the 20th century. Later during the 20th century, common law jurisdictions split over both children's rights and youth rights; in some, such as the USA, a traditional father's control became a right to shared parental control and emancipation remained a remedy for mature minors, but in others, for example England, the idea of absolute control over minors has been repudiated; parent's responsibilities are emphasized and children's rights promoted. In these jurisdictions, the rights of minors to act on their own behalf are granted on a case-by-case basis if a minor can show the capacity and maturity to handle them, and juvenile emancipation from control is deemed unnecessary.

An emancipated minor does not simply acquire all rights of an adult; likewise, a child does not lack such rights merely because they are not emancipated. For example, in the US minors have some rights to consent to medical procedures without parental consent or emancipation, under the doctrine of the mature minor. In England a minor may still not own and administer land. Also in any jurisdiction statute law may limit action due to insufficient age, such as the purchase of alcohol or the right to drive on public roads, without regard to capacity.

== Global understanding of emancipation ==
Common law countries that retain the idea of control and emancipation include Canada, South Africa, and the United States. Countries that have followed the route to gradual civic rights for adolescents include England and Wales, Ireland, Australia and New Zealand. Statutory provision for juvenile emancipation has spread outside of common law jurisdictions, for example in Brazil.

In other countries some aspects of emancipation are in force. The right to engage in civil acts as an adult are granted after marriage, as is the freedom of liability for the parent. In Argentina, where there is no lower age limit on marriage, child marriage is sometimes used as a mechanism for emancipation. The rights granted in such cases may not be as full as common-law emancipation.

== Routes to emancipation ==
Express: When the parent(s) or legal guardian agrees with the minor that the minor can leave home, become self-sustaining, and control their own wages and assets. Courts may review. For example, elements of coercion can void the emancipation, so if a child agrees to leave because their life has been made intolerable through fault, the court may decree the parents still owe a duty of support.

Implied: When circumstances dictate that a child has become emancipated, even though no explicit agreement was made. Common reasons include marriage, military service, or other reasons given by statutory definition or through case law.

Court order: A court may declare a minor to be emancipated when deciding a relevant case or following a petition of emancipation. Not all jurisdictions that support emancipation allow a direct petition to the courts; for example, in Canada only Quebec does. Even in those jurisdictions that do, the court may not allow a minor to file on their own behalf (as they are not yet emancipated), nor may they directly instruct a lawyer to act on their behalf. Instead they petition through an adult next friend. Courts decide in the minor's best interest: between parental control, care through child services (including fostering or adoption), and emancipation.

Partial: A minor may be considered emancipated for some purposes and not others. A grant of partial emancipation may, for example, be given to homeless youths to allow them to consent to state housing programs. Marriage, incarceration, living apart, pregnancy and parenthood may automatically confer some of the rights of emancipation, particularly health consent and privacy in US states unless the minor is younger than the absolute minimum age of emancipation in their state.

Although allowed for in common law, some of these methods could be almost impossible to use in practice in a particular jurisdiction, especially if it has no relevant statute or case law.

== United States ==
In general, minors are under the control of their parents or legal guardians until they attain the age of majority or are otherwise legally emancipated, at which point they legally become adults. In most states, the age of majority is upon reaching 18 years of age. The exceptions are Alabama and Nebraska, where the age of majority is 19, and Mississippi and Puerto Rico, where it is 21. Depending on state laws, minors may be able to obtain medical treatment, marry, or exercise other rights (such as driving, voting, etc.) before reaching the age of majority, without parental consent.

In special circumstances, minors can be freed from control by their guardians (i.e. emancipated) before they reach the age of majority. In some states, marriage automatically emancipates a minor, but not in Massachusetts. In some states (including California and Vermont), membership in the armed forces can also automatically emancipate a minor. In most states, other forms of emancipation require a court order, and some states set a minimum age at which emancipation can be granted. In general, an emancipated minor does not require parental consent to enter into contracts, get married, join the armed forces, receive medical treatment, apply for a passport, or obtain financing.

=== Parental duties ===
Parents have a number of legal duties while bringing up their biological or adopted child (e.g., a fiduciary duty to act in the best interest of the child). Failure to meet these requirements can result in the state taking civil and/or criminal action against the child's parent(s). When the "parent" is not the biological or adoptive parent of the child, such as a stepchild or an informal adoption (not adopted by court order), the matter is more complex; various legal doctrines, as well as statutes in many states, may impose various support obligations on step-parents. Emancipation terminates these parental obligations and duties of support.

While parents may have expectations of particular conduct or contributions from their children, parents may not condition the provision of basic necessities upon the child conducting or contributing. However, they may condition other privileges on particular conduct or contribution by the child. When a child fails to conduct themselves according to rules which ensure their basic safety and the safety of those around them, a parent has recourse to petition a court to declare the child a "person in need of supervision", which essentially transfers guardianship to the state, who in turn subjects the child to supervision in the form of a group home or in foster care monitored by an officer of the court. This does not necessarily discharge parents from their duty of financial support.

Children who have not reached the age of majority are generally not able to manage their property, enter into contracts (including enrollment contracts to university), or make certain life-altering decisions for themselves, such as the right to marry or to join the armed forces. Such decisions can, in some cases, be made with parental consent (e.g., the marriage of a child over age 16), and in other cases are proscribed or require a judicial consent (e.g., the marriage of a child under 13). A legal guardian (including a parent) may dispose of the property (including bank accounts) of the child, generally for the benefit of the child, including the provision of basic necessities. Wages which a child earns may be considered the child's property or may be required to be turned over to their parents to satisfy parental claims for costs associated with discharging parental responsibilities, depending on the laws of the relevant jurisdiction.

Upon emancipation, a minor will no longer be subject to claims by their parent/guardian for contribution out of their wages and will be granted full authority and legal ownership of their property and bank accounts. They would also gain the legal capacity to enter into binding contracts and have the authority to marry or join the armed forces.

=== Emancipation laws ===
Emancipation laws and processes vary from state to state. In most states, minors seeking emancipation must file a petition with the family court in the applicable jurisdiction, formally requesting emancipation and citing reasons it is in their best interest to be emancipated, and must show financial self-sufficiency. In some states, free legal aid is available to minors seeking emancipation, through children law centers. This can be a valuable resource for minors in framing an emancipation petition. Students are able to stay with a guardian if necessary. In some states, an emancipation petition may be filed by a parent, for example in Alabama.

Emancipation is not readily granted because of the subjectivity and narrowness of the "best interest" requirement. Some minors have been victims of abuse. In most cases, the state's department of child services will be notified of potential abuse and the child may be placed in foster care. Other minors may seek emancipation for reasons such as being dissatisfied with their parents' or guardians' rules. In California, a minor cannot use the excuse of not obeying the parent's reasonable and proper orders or directions of parents, and that minor could become a ward of the court, instead of being emancipated.

Where a statute of limitations for bringing a legal action is tolled while a person is a minor, emancipation will usually end that tolling.

Based on federal and state laws, those whose mental disability is so severe that they are incapable of caring for themselves may not necessarily be considered or legally viewed as emancipated, even though they have attained the age of majority. That may or may not affect legal matters related to such things as insurance benefits, SSI, SSDI, wills, tax obligations to them and their caregivers, medical decisions, religious choices, residential and other accommodations, etc. due to their non-emancipated status.

== See also ==
- Youth suffrage
- Age of consent
- Mature minor doctrine
- Gillick competence
- Age of majority
- Marriageable age
- Youth rights
- Disownment
- Child abuse
