= Lasting power of attorney =

Authorisation under English law to act on someone else's behalf

Lasting powers of attorney (LPAs) in English law were created under the Mental Capacity Act 2005, and came into effect on 1 October 2007. The LPA replaced the former enduring powers of attorney (EPA) which were narrower in scope. Their purpose is to meet the needs of those who can see a time when they will lack capacity to look after their own affairs. There are two types of LPA: health and welfare, and property and financial affairs; either or both may be created. The LPA allows them to make appropriate arrangements for family members or trusted friends to be authorised to make decisions on their behalf. The LPA is created and registered with the Office of the Public Guardian (OPG), an executive agency of the Ministry of Justice of the United Kingdom.

== Purpose ==
The LPA is a specific form of the more general power of attorney which is widely used in countries which have a common law system. The word attorney in this context is someone (or in some circumstances an organisation such as a company) legally appointed or empowered to act for another person. The person giving the power is known as the donor. The word 'lasting' in the context of an LPA means that the power may continue even if the person (though still alive) no longer has capacity to exercise the power. The Lasting Power of Attorney can be applied for online. The gov.uk tool offers guidance throughout the process, and prevents the user from making mistakes that may invalidate their LPA application.

The former EPA was simple to administer, but failed to provide for some decisions which may have to be made in circumstances that preclude their being made by the person principally affected. In particular, the attorney's powers under the EPA were largely defined in terms of money and property, and were not related to decisions on medical matters such as the continuation or otherwise cessation of life-sustaining treatment, or welfare matters such as a move to a different kind of accommodation. The primary purpose of the changes under Mental Capacity Act 2005 (MCA 2005) was to rectify this omission, by creating two types of LPA: one for property and financial affairs (the LPA(PFA)) and one for health and welfare (the LPA(H&W)).

== Business Lasting Power of Attorney ==
While the LPA is primarily designed to deal with personal affairs and finances, business owners or directors are faced with more complex considerations. While a close friend or family member may be suitable for managing personal affairs in times of incapacity, businesses may require subject matter experts and depending on the business structure, there are certain governance requirements. Therefore, the Business Lasting Power of Attorney (BLPA) is a separate arrangement that is similar in function to the LPA. Business owners arranging a LPA and BLPA can therefore split between personal and business affairs.

== Administrative and legal background ==
The LPA system is administered by the Office of the Public Guardian (OPG), an agency of the Ministry of Justice of the United Kingdom. Its contact details are explained in section 2.2 below headed 'The role of the OPG in relation to Lasting Powers of Attorney'. The OPG was set up in 2007 under the MCA 2005, replacing the similarly-named Public Guardianship Office which had a more limited range of responsibilities. It is headed by the Public Guardian, whose main role is the protection of people who lack mental capacity.

The MCA 2005 provides a statutory framework to empower and protect vulnerable people who are not able to make their own decisions. It makes clear who can take decisions on their behalf, in which situations, and how they should do so. Through the LPA, the Act enables people to plan for a time when they may lose capacity. Detailed guidance is provided by a Code of Practice to the MCA 2005 to the Act, which people working as professionals in this field are required to 'have regard to': that is, to observe, unless (having decided in specific circumstances not to do so) they are prepared to explain afterwards – most probably in a post-incident inquiry – why not.

Where there are suspicions that an attorney might not be acting in the best interests of the donor, the OPG will arrange an investigation. If the OPG decides that formal action is required, and more generally if any disputes arise on subjects covered by the MCA, the matter is referred to the Court of Protection (CoP), which is part of the Family Division of the High Court and was set up under the MCA for this purpose. The role of the CoP in decision-making is complementary to that of the OPG in relation to matters of regulation and supervision.

=== The 'five principles' ===
The guiding principles of the MCA 2005 are set out in five principles which indicate how the term 'capacity' (implying in this context mental capacity) is to be interpreted:

1. A person must be assumed to have capacity unless it is established that he lacks capacity.
2. A person is not to be treated as unable to make a decision unless all practicable steps to help him to do so have been taken without success.
3. A person is not to be treated as unable to make a decision merely because he makes an unwise decision.
4. An act done, or decision made, under this Act for or on behalf of a person who lacks capacity must be done, or made, in his best interests.
5. Before the act is done, or the decision is made, regard must be had to whether the purpose for which it is needed can be as effectively achieved in a way that is less restrictive of the person's rights and freedom of action.

The test so defined is 'decision-specific'. It can indicate an answer to the question 'Can he any longer use a gas ring safely when unsupervised?', but does not allow for wider questions to be given a firm yes/no answer when the real answer is that he has restricted capacity and so can deal with some aspects but not others. As stated in an official summary of the Act, it is 'a single clear test for assessing whether a person lacks capacity to take a particular decision at a particular time'.

=== Creating an LPA ===
From the point of view of someone who needs (or may potentially need) one or both LPAs, the Office of the Public Guardian is one of the first points of contact.

To apply for a Lasting Power of Attorney, the donor has to fill in the application forms giving details for themselves, the attorneys, and a person who has known the donor well for at least two years, known as the certificate provider, to certify that the decision has been made with the donor's understanding and agreement. An LPA cannot be created once the donor has lost capacity.

A Lasting Power of Attorney is made by filling in a form in a prescribed manner, signed by the donor, the attorneys, the certificate provider, and two witnesses in a prescribed order. There is a website which allows data to be filled in, and then generates a filled-in form in printable PDF format ready to be signed and witnessed. Detailed instructions are provided for both types of LPA, 'Property and Financial Affairs' and 'Health and Welfare', in document form (on request, or by download), or on the Web site. A solicitor may be engaged to prepare the LPA, but this is not a requirement.

The OPG documentation provides some help and advice on drafting the LPA in a way which best meets the requirements of the donor when the LPA needs to be activated.

A fee of £92 is payable at the time of registration from 17 November 2025, increased from £82 previously, for either of the two types of LPA, with exemption or reduction in some cases.

=== Using the lasting power of attorney ===
Before 1 January 2016 the original registered power of attorney had to be presented to an institution for it to accept the attorneys' instructions. An electronic procedure was then implemented whereby it became possible for donors, attorneys and other people or organisations to view a summary of an LPA and to monitor who has been given access to it, using an access code supplied by an attorney. This "Use a lasting power of attorney service" originally applied to LPAs registered from 17 July 2020, with plans to extend it to earlier ones. The electronic procedure replaced the lengthy and often problematic process of requesting power of attorney documents by post for verification purposes.

Once the donor has created a lasting power of attorney and it has been registered with the Office of the Public Guardian, it can be activated when required, allowing the attorneys to act on behalf of the donor, for example, paying the donor's bills, managing investments, and so on. However, in practice, this can prove much harder than it may sound.

The powers granted by the property and financial affairs LPA require the relevant institution (for example, the bank or insurance company) to accept the power of attorney and allow the attorney to act. Many institutions, while in theory accepting the power, make it extremely difficult to put in practice. Many claim that this is to protect the donor or to comply with money laundering regulations, but whatever the reasons, it can make the whole process very challenging and stressful, especially if the donor themselves is by this time unable to support the process, for example, from failing mental capacity.

Ways in which institutions can obstruct the process include:

- requiring identity verification of the donor (which is not required in law and may in practice be very difficult if utility bills have already been redirected to the attorney's address and the donor is now mentally or physically frail)
- by insisting on seeing the sole original copy of the power of attorney, rather than accepting a certified copy
- questioning the identity of the attorney and requiring substantial proofs via certified copies of documents such as passports, even where the address of the attorney remains as stated on the LPA

Even once the authority of the attorney is accepted by the institution, they may choose to limit what the donor can do, for example by:

- not supporting a full range of services, such as internet banking and telephone banking, or refusing to issue cheque books or debit cards to attorneys
- continuing to send correspondence to the donor's address instead of the attorney's
- refusing to accept the attorney's instructions without the confirmation of the donor

The only recourse in these cases is to complain first to the institution in question, and if this fails to the Financial Ombudsman Service.

Sources such as The Guardian and The Telegraph have reported on these challenges.

=== Disclaiming a lasting power of attorney ===
The Office of the Public Guardian refers to the process by which someone may wish to cease to be an attorney under a lasting power of attorney as "disclaiming" the power.
