= Raiffeisen Zentralbank Österreich AG v Five Star General Trading LLC =

2001 judicial decision of the Court of Appeal of England and Wales

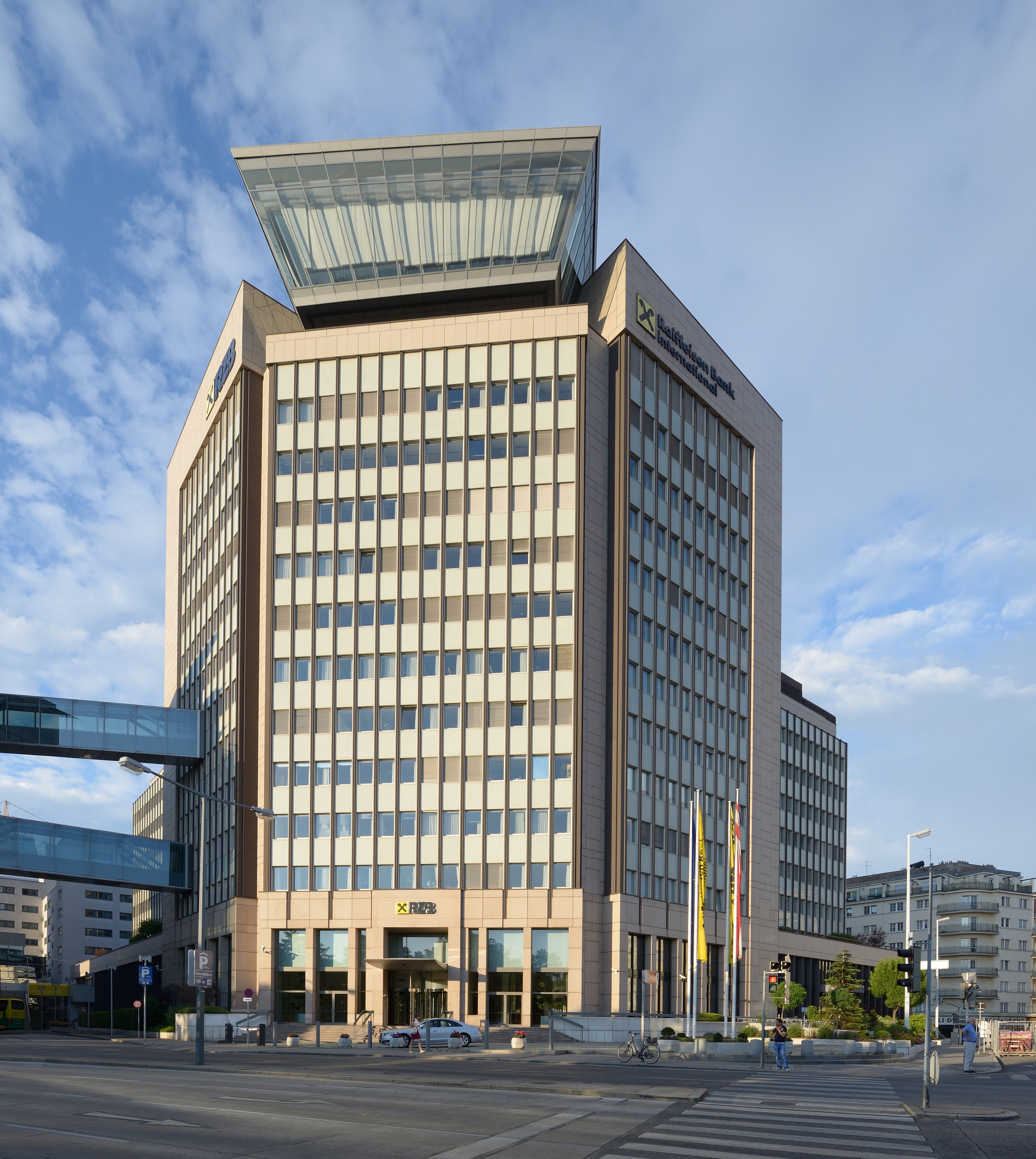
- Raiffeisen Zentralbank Österreich headquarters
- Court: Court of Appeal
- Full case name: Raiffeisen Zentralbank Österreich AG v Five Star General Trading LLC
- Decided: 26 January 2001
- Citations: [2001] QB 825 [2001] 2 WLR 1344 [2001] EWCA Civ 68 [2001] 1 Lloyd's Rep 597 [2001] 1 LLR 597 [2001] Lloyd's Rep IR 460 [2001] 1 All ER (Comm) 961 [2001] 3 All ER 257 [2001] Lloyds Rep IR 460 [2001] CLC 843

Case history
- Appealed from: [2000] 2 Ll.R. 684

Court membership
- Judges sitting: Mance LJ, Aldous LJ and Charles J

Case opinions
- Decision by: Mance LJ
- Concur/dissent: Aldous LJ, Charles J

Keywords
- conflict of laws; mortgage; characterisation

Raiffeisen Zentralbank Österreich AG v Five Star General Trading LLC [2001] EWCA Civ 68, [2001] QB 825 (frequently shortened to RZB v Five Star) is a judicial decision of the Court of Appeal of England and Wales relating to the conflict of laws.

The case related to a security interest which was created in favour of the bank over the insurance proceeds relating to a ship. The ship was later involved in a collision, and the third party sought to assert a claim to the insurance proceeds in priority to the bank's rights under the security agreement. The choice of law rules suggested different outcomes depending upon whether this was characterised as an issue of contract law (in which case it would be determined by English law, and the bank would prevail) or an issue of property law (in which case French law would apply, and the third party would prevail).

The Court of Appeal held that the choice of law rules relating to contracts should be applied, and accordingly, the bank prevailed.

== Facts ==
At the centre of the case was a ship by the name of the Mount I. The owners of the Mount I were based in Dubai. The owners of the Mount I (Five Star General Trading LLC) had purchased the vessel with a loan from Raiffeisen Zentralbank Österreich AG, an Austrian bank. The vessel was insured with a French insurance company, but the insurance policy was expressed to be governed by English law. As part of the security for the loan, the bank had taken a mortgage over the vessel and an assignment by way of security of the insurance proceeds.

On 26 September 1997 there was a collision in the Strait of Malacca between the Mount I and another vessel, the ICL Vikraman. The ICL Vikram sank, with the tragic loss of life of 29 of her crew, and also total loss of her cargo. The ICL Vikram was owned by a group of Taiwanese companies. After the collision of 26 September 1997, the Mount I was arrested in Malaysia by the owners of the ICL Vikraman. She was later sold by order of the Malaysian court. Her sale realised US$3,082,805 which was held by the Malaysian court pending the resolution of the priority dispute between the Austrian bank and the Taiwanese owners of the ICL Vikraman, but those proceeds were insufficient to fully discharge either claim (much less both of them).

Both the Austrian bank and the Taiwanese owners of the ICL Vikraman sought to attach the insurance proceeds relating to the Mount I. The Austrian bank claimed it had a first ranking claim to the proceeds because of the perfected security interest over the policies of insurance. The Taiwanese ship owners claimed that they had a first ranking claim because they had obtained orders of attachment in France which was where the insurer was located, and the bank had not.

The English Court of Appeal had to decide which system of laws to apply to the claim. The Austrian bank claimed that as the policy was governed by English law, that law should apply (and the bank would win). The Taiwanese shipowners claimed that this was not a question of contract, but of property, and the insurance proceeds were deemed to be located where the debtor (ie. the insurance company was located) - in France. They argued French law should thus apply, and that as they had first attachment under French law, their claim should prevail.

== Judgment ==
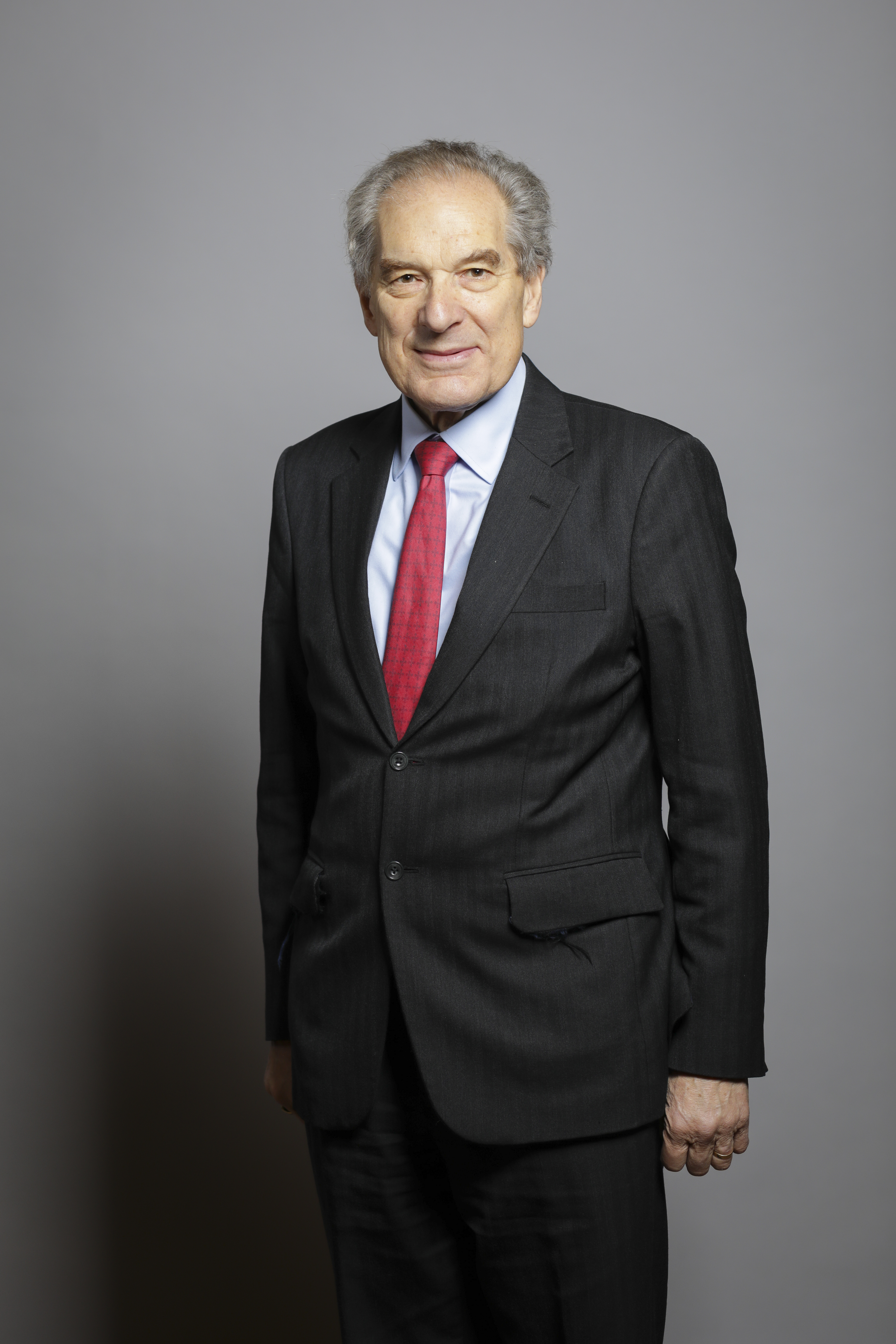
Mance LJ

=== High Court ===
In the High Court the matter came before Longmore J, who commented in the course of his judgment that it was like "being set an examination question on the applicable law". He adjudicated the issue to be one of contract, and held the issue was to be determined by English law (as the chosen governing law of the insurance contract), and so the Austrian bank prevailed. The Taiwanese shipowners appealed.

=== Court of Appeal ===
In the Court of Appeal, Mance LJ gave the only judgment. After reviewing the facts and the decision in the Court, he reiterated that the essential decision that the court had to make was the "choice between the proper law of the insurance and the lex situs of the insurance claim."

==== Choice of law issue ====
He affirmed and restated the general principle set out in Macmillan Inc v Bishopsgate Investment Trust plc (No 3) [1995] EWCA Civ 55, [1996] WLR 387. It is a three-stage process involving: (1) characterisation of the relevant issue; (2) selection of the rule of conflict of laws which lays down a connecting factor for that issue; and (3) identification of the system of law which is tied by that connecting factor to that issue. He also reiterated the general principle that the process falls to be undertaken in a broad internationalist spirit in accordance with the principles of conflict of laws of the forum. (Aldous LJ, who was sitting in this case, was also a member of the Court of Appeal in the Macmillan case.) In an oft-cited passage he noted:

The overall aim is to identify the most appropriate law to govern a particular issue. The classes or categories of issue which the law recognises at the first stage are man-made, not natural. They have no inherent value, beyond their purpose in assisting to select the most appropriate law. A mechanistic application, without regard to the consequences, would conflict with the purpose for which they were conceived. They may require redefinition or modification, or new categories may have to be recognised accompanied by new rules at stage 2, if this is necessary to achieve the overall aim of identifying the most appropriate law (cf also Dicey & Morris on The Conflict of Laws, 13th Ed. paragraph 2-005).

Mance LJ then noted that the three-stage process cannot therefore be pursued by taking each step "in turn and in isolation". There is, he held, an element of inter-play or even circularity in the three-stage process. "[T]he conflict of laws does not depend (like a game or even an election) upon the application of rigid rules, but upon a search for appropriate principles to meet particular situations."

He noted that both England and France were party to the Rome Convention on the Law Applicable to Contractual Obligations (now superseded by the Rome I Regulation). Article 12 of the Convention provides:

12.(1) The mutual obligations of assignor and assignee under a voluntary assignment of a right against another person ("the debtor") shall be governed by the law which under this Convention applies to the contract between assignor and assignee.
(2) The law governing the right to which the assignment relates shall determine its assignability, the relationship between the assignee and the debtor, the conditions under which the assignment can be invoked against the debtor and any question whether the debtor's obligations have been discharged.

He noted that the Guiliano-Lagarde report on the Convention clearly indicated that property rights were not included within the Convention. Conversely, he pointed out that "contractual rights" were to be given an autonomous meaning, taking an internationalist approach, rather than looking at strictly English concepts of contract and property.

After reviewing the arguments he held that the wording of the Convention, and in particular the reference to the rights between the assignee and debtor, meant the Convention rules (ie. the choice of law rules for contracts) must apply in preference to the English common law choice of law rules relating to property. He felt fortified in that conclusion by the comments in the Guliano-Lagarde report that "The words 'conditions under which the assignment can be invoked' cover the conditions of transferability of the assignment as well as the procedures required to give effect to the assignment in relation to the debtor."

==== Assignment issue ====
Having decided that, the Court then had to adjudicate the type of assignment which the security document created. This related to the declaratory relief sought, and the effect which it would have in the related proceedings in France and Malaysia.

Mance LJ noted that "[u]nder English law, an assignment may occur in a pot-pourri of three different forms, with variegated terminology." It can arise at law (either under the Marine Insurance Act 1906, section 50 or the Law of Property Act 1925, section 136(1)), or it can arise in equity. After carefully reviewing the document he held:

On that basis, I consider that there was an assignment of the benefit of any claims under the policy, including collision liability claims. Further, although such assignment cannot in my judgment have taken effect under either s.50 or s.136, there is no reason why it did not take effect in equity.

== Reception ==
Commentary on the decision has been largely position. Alongside Macmillan v Bishopsgate it is now treated as the authoritative process for the process for charactersiation of issues in relation to choice of law.

- Dicey Morris & Collins cites the case extensively for a variety of propositions. These include the propositions that:
  - where a "rule of substantive law should not be regarded as falling within either of the two potentially applicable conflict rules ... a new conflict rule should be created".
  - "the contract of assignment will determine the availability of any remedy which the assignee may have against the assignor for breach of contract".
  - that "the expression “contractual obligations” is to be given an autonomous interpretation" under the Rome I Regulation.
- Cheshire North & Fawcett cites the decision as authoritative in relation to a number of propositions, including the need to take an "internationalist approach" to characterisation, characterisation of security assignments as contractual rather than proprietary, and for the proposition that "there is no appropriate conflicts rule that can cover the substantive rule a new conflict rule should be created".
- Clarkson & Hill make particular reference to the obiter dictum in the judgment relating to the call for flexibility in relation to approach in identifying the appropriate choice of law rule.

== Subsequent decisions ==
The decision has been cited with approval in numerous subsequent cases, including the Supreme Court:

- Knight v Axa Assurances [2009] EWHC 1900 (QB)
- Buhr v Barclays Bank plc [2001] EWCA Civ 1223
- Iran v Berend [2007] EWHC 132 (QB)
- Gorjat v Gorjat [2010] EWHC 1537 (Ch)
- Cox v Ergo Versicherung AG [2014] UKSC 22

== Sources ==
- Collins, Lawrence (2012). Dicey, Morris & Collins: The Conflict of Laws (15th ed.). Sweet & Maxwell. ISBN 978-0-414-02453-3.
- Hill, Jonathan (2016). Clarkson & Hill's Conflict of Laws (5th ed.). OUP. ISBN 978-0-19-873229-7.
- Torremans, Paul (2017). Cheshire, North & Fawcett: Private International Law (15th ed.). OUP. ISBN 978-0-19-967899-0.
