= E (Mrs) v Eve =

- Supreme Court of Canada

Hearing: June 4–5, 1985 Judgment: October 23, 1986
- Full case name: Eve, by her Guardian ad litem, Milton B. Fitzpatrick, Official Trustee v. Mrs. E.
- Citations: [1986] 2 S.C.R. 388
- Docket No.: 16654
- Prior history: Judgment for Mrs. E. in the Court of Appeal for Prince Edward Island.
- Ruling: appeal allowed

Holding
- A proxy decision-maker cannot consent to the non-therapeutic sterilization of a mentally incompetent person.

Court membership
- Chief Justice: Brian Dickson; Puisne Justices: Jean Beetz, Willard Estey, William McIntyre, Julien Chouinard, Antonio Lamer, Bertha Wilson, Gerald Le Dain, Gérard La Forest

Reasons given
- Unanimous reasons by: La Forest J.

E (Mrs) v Eve, [1986] 2 S.C.R. 388 is a judgment by the Supreme Court of Canada regarding a mother's request for the consent of the court to have her disabled daughter sterilized. This was a landmark case which is influential in Canadian legal decisions involving proxy-consented, non-therapeutic medical procedures performed on people of diminished mental capacity.

== Background ==
=== Case ===
Eve was a 24-year-old woman suffering from "extreme expressive aphasia" and was at least "mildly to moderately developmentally delayed" with learning skills at a limited level. She spent the week at a school for adults with mental disabilities, and went back to her mother's home on the weekends. Administrators at Eve's care facility noticed that she was developing a close relationship with a male resident, also disabled, and became concerned. Mrs. E, also, was concerned that Eve might innocently become pregnant. Her disability prevented her from understanding the concept of marriage or the "consequential relationship between intercourse, pregnancy and birth," and she would be unable to carry out the necessary duties of motherhood.

In order to ensure she had the right, as Eve's substitute decision-maker, to consent to the sterilization procedure, Mrs. E requested that:

- Eve be declared a mentally incompetent pursuant to the provisions of the Mental Health Act
- She (Mrs. E.) be appointed the committee of the person of Eve
- Mrs. E. be authorized to consent to a tubal ligation operation being performed on Eve.

A major concern of the court was that tubal ligation, in this instance, was non-therapeutic (i.e. not necessary for medical reasons) and that a hysterectomy, which was "authorized by the Appeal Division", was major surgery.

One of the arguments made against Mrs. E. was that the Canadian Charter of Rights and Freedoms was that a court-ordered sterilization of this person of diminished capacity was depriving that person of her right to procreate, infringing on Eve's right to liberty and security.

=== Previous rulings ===
In the Family Division of the Supreme Court of Prince Edward Island, Mrs. E.'s requests were denied. Although the judge had no issue with the first two petitions (i.e. the appointment of Mrs. E. as Eve's formal guardian), he rejected the third, on the basis that substitute decision makers cannot consent to non-therapeutic surgical procedures.

On appeal, the original ruling was overturned. The majority of the three judge panel stated that there was sufficient evidence to warrant the sterilization of Eve, and that the parens patriae powers of the court allowed it to consent, on behalf of the incompetent individual, to therapeutic surgical procedures. That court stated that the parens patriae powers of the court were to be used for the benefit of the incompetent individual, and that sufficient evidence had been presented to convince them that sterilization was in Eve's best interest.

== Ruling ==
The Supreme Court of Canada, however, ruled in favour of Eve, and unanimously rejected Mrs. E.'s request for authorization to perform a sterilization procedure. The opinion of the Supreme Court of Canada was that "barring emergency situations, a surgical procedure without consent ordinarily constitutes battery, [and] it will be obvious that the onus of proving the need for the procedure is on those who seek to have it performed...In conducting these procedures, it is obvious that a court must proceed with extreme caution; otherwise...it would open the way for abuse of the mentally incompetent, ...[they] would allow the appeal and restore the decision" of the original court, which had rejected the petition.

== See also ==
- List of Supreme Court of Canada cases (Dickson Court)
- Marion's case
