= Mature minor doctrine =

American rule of law

The mature minor doctrine is a rule of law found in the United States and Canada accepting that an unemancipated minor patient may possess the maturity to choose or reject a particular health care treatment, sometimes without the knowledge or agreement of parents, and should be permitted to do so. It is now generally considered a form of patients rights; formerly, the mature minor rule was largely seen as protecting health care providers from criminal and civil claims by parents of minors at least 15 years old.

Jurisdictions may codify an age of medical consent, accept the judgment of licensed providers regarding an individual minor, or accept a formal court decision following a request that a patient be designated a mature minor, or may rely on some combination. For example, patients at least 16 may be assumed to be mature minors for this purpose, patients aged 13 to 15 may be designated so by licensed providers, and pre-teen patients may be so-designated after evaluation by an agency or court. The mature minor doctrine is sometimes connected with enforcing confidentiality of minor patients from their parents.

== Statute ==
In the United States, a typical statute lists: "Who may consent [or withhold consent for] surgical or medical treatment or procedures."

"...Any unemancipated minor of sufficient intelligence to understand and appreciate the consequences of the proposed surgical or medical treatment or procedures, for himself."

== Medical emancipation ==
By definition, a "mature minor" has been found to have the capacity for decisional autonomy, or the right to make decisions including whether to undergo risky but potentially life-saving medical decisions alone, without parental approval. By contrast, "medical emancipation" formally releases children from some parental involvement requirements but does not necessarily grant that decision making to children themselves. Pursuant to statute, several jurisdictions grant medical emancipation to a minor who has become pregnant or requires sexual-health services, thereby permitting medical treatment without parental consent and, often, confidentiality from parents. A limited guardianship may be appointed to make medical decisions for the medically emancipated minor and the minor may not be permitted to refuse or even choose treatment.

== History ==
One significant early U.S. case, Smith v. Seibly, 72 Wn.2d 16, 431 P.2d 719 (1967), before the Washington Supreme Court, establishes precedent on the mature minor doctrine. The plaintiff, Albert G. Smith, an 18-year-old married father, was suffering from myasthenia gravis, a progressive disease. Because of this, Smith expressed concern that his wife might become burdened in caring for him, for their existing child and possibly for additional children. On March 9, 1961, while still 18, Smith requested a vasectomy. His doctor required written consent, which Smith provided, and the surgery was performed. Later, after reaching Washington's statutory age of majority, then 21, the doctor was sued by Smith, who now claimed that he had been a minor and thus unable to grant surgical or medical consent. The Court rejected Smith's argument: "Thus, age, intelligence, maturity, training, experience, economic independence or lack thereof, general conduct as an adult and freedom from the control of parents are all factors to be considered in such a case [involving consent to surgery]."

The court further quoted another recently decided case, Grannum v. Berard, 70 Wn.2d 304, 307, 422 P.2d 812 (1967): "The mental capacity necessary to consent to a surgical operation is a question of fact to be determined from the circumstances of each individual case." The court explicitly stated that a minor may grant surgical consent even without formal emancipation.

Especially since the 1970s, older pediatric patients sought to make autonomous decisions regarding their own treatment, and sometimes sued successfully to do so. The decades of accumulated evidence tended to demonstrate that children are capable of participating in medical decision-making in a meaningful way; and legal and medical communities have demonstrated an increasing willingness to formally affirm decisions made by young people, even regarding life and death.

Religious beliefs have repeatedly influenced a patient's decision to choose treatment or not. In a case in 1989 in Illinois, a 17-year-old female Jehovah's Witness was permitted to refuse necessary life saving treatments.

In 1990, the United States Congress passed the Patient Self-Determination Act; even though key provisions apply only to patients over age 18, the legislation advanced patient involvement in decision-making. The West Virginia Supreme Court, in Belcher v. Charleston Area Medical Center (1992) defined a "mature minor" exception to parental consent, according consideration to seven factors to be weighed regarding such a minor: age, ability, experience, education, exhibited judgment, conduct, and appreciation of relevant risks and consequences.

The 2000s and 2010s experienced a number of outbreaks of vaccine-preventable diseases, such as the 2019–2020 measles outbreaks, which were fueled in part by vaccine hesitancy. This prompted minors to seek vaccinations over objections from their parents. Beginning in the 2020s during the COVID-19 pandemic, minors also began seeking out the COVID-19 vaccine over the objections of their vaccine-hesitant parents. This has led to proposals and bills allowing minors to consent to be administered with any approved vaccine.

== Laws by jurisdiction ==
=== Canada ===
The Supreme Court of Canada recognized mature minor doctrine in 2009 in A.C. v. Manitoba [2009] SCC 30; in provinces and territories lacking relevant statutes, common law is presumed to be applied.

Province or Territory	Minimum age	Notes
Alberta	None	No statute exists in Alberta dictating an age of consent; absent a statute, common law being the mature minor doctrine endorsed by the Supreme Court of Canada applies.
British Columbia	None	The Infants Act does not set an age at which a child becomes capable of consent to medical procedures. A child is capable of consenting if they understand the nature and consequences of the treatment, the reasonably foreseeable benefits and risks, and a medical practitioner determines it is in their best interests.
Manitoba	None	People under 16 are presumed to be incapable of giving consent unless proven otherwise. Otherwise, the mature minor doctrine still applies.
New Brunswick	None	A minor may consent if they're capable of understanding the nature and consequences of the treatment and the practitioner believes it's in their interests.
Newfoundland and Labrador	None	No statute exists in Newfoundland and Labrador dictating an age of consent; absent a statute, common law being the mature minor doctrine endorsed by the Supreme Court of Canada applies.
Northwest Territories	None	No statute exists in Northwest Territories dictating an age of consent; absent a statute, common law being the mature minor doctrine endorsed by the Supreme Court of Canada applies.
Nova Scotia	None	No statute exists in Nova Scotia dictating an age of consent; absent a statute, common law being the mature minor doctrine endorsed by the Supreme Court of Canada applies.
Nunavut	None	No statute exists in Nunavut dictating an age of consent; absent a statute, common law being the mature minor doctrine endorsed by the Supreme Court of Canada applies.
Ontario	None	The Health Care Consent Act allows all persons capable of informed consent to agree to treatment and presumes all people of being capable of giving consent, unless there is reason to believe to the contrary.
Prince Edward Island	None	Comparable to Ontario, all people are presumed capable of consent.
Quebec	14	Minors of the minimum are able to consent to procedures not required for their health. Parental consent is still required for anything that involves serious risks or may cause serious effects to the child.
Saskatchewan	None	No statute exists in Saskatchewan dictating an age of consent; absent a statute, common law being the mature minor doctrine endorsed by the Supreme Court of Canada applies.
Yukon	None	Comparable to Ontario, all people are presumed capable of consent.

=== United States ===
Several states permit minors to legally consent to general medical treatment (routine, nonemergency care, especially when the risk of treatment is considered to be low) without parental consent or over parental objections, when the minor is at least 14 years old. In addition, many other states allow minors to consent to medical procedures under a more limited set of circumstances. These include providing limited minor autonomy only in enumerated cases, such as blood donation, substance abuse, sexual and reproductive health (including abortion and sexually transmitted infections), or for emergency medical services. Many states also exempt specific groups of minors from parental consent, such as homeless youth, emancipated minors, minor parents, or married minors. Further complicating matters is the interaction between state tort law, state contract law, and federal law, depending on if the clinic accepts federal funding under Title X or Medicaid.

State	Minimum age	Notes
Alabama	16	Minors 16 years or older or who have graduated high school can consent to medical procedures. Changed from 14 to 16 effective October 1, 2025. No evaluation of maturity required.
Alaska	None	No evaluation of maturity required. Parental consent is not required for abortion, as this violates the Constitution of Alaska's clause protecting privacy.
Arkansas	None	Any minors capable of informed consent.
California	12	CA Family Code 6926 permits minors to consent to immunization against sexually transmitted infections.
Delaware	None	"Reasonable efforts" must have first been made to secure parental consent. Minors can consent to vaccinations for sexually transmitted infections.
Idaho	None	Any minors capable of informed consent.
Illinois	None	Any minors capable of informed consent, but informed refusal of medical treatment can be overruled.
Kansas	16	Minors aged 16 are permitted de jure to consent to medical treatment when no parent is available. Mature minors are permitted to consent to medical treatment, but maturity must be assessed on a case-by-case basis.
Louisiana	None	Minors are allowed to consent to any medical procedure they deem necessary.
Maine	None	A mature minor's wishes expressed in a living will must be considered.
Massachusetts	None	Mature minors meeting are permitted to consent to medical treatment, but only if their "best interests ... will be served by not notifying his or her parents of intended medical treatment."
Minnesota	None	Minnesota Statutes §144.3441 permits minors to consent to immunization against Hepatitis B.
Montana	None	Any minors who have completed high school are able to consent to medical treatment.
Nevada	None	Mature minors meeting are permitted to consent to medical treatment, but only if the healthcare worker believes the minor would risk a "serious health hazard" absent treatment.
New York	None	NY Public Health Law §2305 permits minors to consent to treatment for and immunization against sexually transmitted infections.
Oregon	15	Minors aged 15 and up have the authority to consent to (but not necessarily refuse) medical treatment.
Pennsylvania	18	Minors aged 18 or who have completed high school can consent to medical treatment.
South Carolina	16	Minors aged 16 and up can consent to any medical treatment other than "operations".
Tennessee	7	Any mature minors capable of informed consent can consent to medical procedures. The courts make the rebuttable presumption that minors aged 7 to 13 are not mature, while minors 14 and up are.
Washington	None	Mature minors may consent to medical procedures, including immunizations.
Washington, D.C.	12	Minors 12 and older may consent to immunization with CDC-approved vaccines, even over parental objections. The law compels healthcare providers to seek payment directly from insurance companies without notifying parents.
West Virginia	None	Any minors capable of informed consent can consent to medical procedures.

== Withholding of consent ==
=== United States ===
In the United States, bodily integrity has long been considered a common law right; The Supreme Court in 1990 (Cruzan v. Director, Missouri Department of Health) allowed that "constitutionally protected liberty interest in refusing unwanted medical treatment may be inferred" in the Due Process Clause of the Fourteenth Amendment to the United States Constitution, but the Court refrained from explicitly establishing what would have been a newly enumerated right. Nevertheless, lower courts have increasingly held that competent patients have the right to refuse any treatment for themselves.

In 1989, the Supreme Court of Illinois interpreted the Supreme Court of the United States to have already adopted major aspects of mature minor doctrine, concluding,

Although the United States Supreme Court has not broadened this constitutional right of minors beyond abortion cases, the [Illinois] appellate court found such an extension "inevitable." ...Nevertheless, the Supreme Court has not held that a constitutionally based right to refuse medical treatment exists, either for adults or minors. ...[U.S. Supreme Court] cases do show, however, that no "bright line" age restriction of 18 is tenable in restricting the rights of mature minors, [thus] mature minors may possess and exercise rights regarding medical care... If the evidence is clear and convincing that the minor is mature enough to appreciate the consequences of her actions, and that the minor is mature enough to exercise the judgment of an adult, then the mature minor doctrine affords her the common law right to consent to or refuse medical treatment [including life and death cases, with some considerations].

In 2016 the case of "In re Z.M." was heard in Maryland regarding a minor's right to refuse chemotherapy.

In Connecticut, Cassandra C. a seventeen-year-old, was ordered by the Connecticut Supreme Court to receive treatment. The court decided that Cassandra was not mature enough to make medical decisions.

=== Canada ===
In 2009, the Supreme Court of Canada ruling in A.C. v. Manitoba [2009] SCC 30 (CanLII) found that children may make life and death decisions about their medical treatment. In the majority opinion, Justice Rosalie Abella wrote:

"The result of this [decision] is that young people under 16 will have the right to demonstrate mature medical decisional capacity. ...If, after a careful analysis of the young person’s ability to exercise mature and independent judgment, the court is persuaded that the necessary level of maturity exists, the young person’s views ought to be respected."

A "dissenting" opinion by Justice Ian Binnie would have gone further:

"At common law, proof of capacity entitles the 'mature minor' to exercise personal autonomy in making medical treatment decisions free of parental or judicial control. ...[A] young person with capacity is entitled to make the treatment decision, not just to have 'input' into a judge’s consideration of what the judge believes to be the young person's best interests."

Analysts note that the Canadian decision merely requires that younger patients be permitted a hearing, and still allows a judge to "decide whether or not to order a medical procedure on an unwilling minor".

== See also ==
- Emancipation of minors
- Marion's Case (Australia)
- Gillick competence (UK)
- Age of consent
- Age of majority
