= James Gillick =

British artist

- Born: 1972 (age 53–54); Norfolk, England, UK
- Known for: Figurative Oil Painting, Drawing, Church re-ordering
- Website: http://www.gillick-artist.com

James Gillick (born 1972, Norfolk) is an artist who works in the figurative tradition. His studio is based in Louth, Lincolnshire. He is known for painting still-life work, and also other subject matter which include game paintings, portraits, horse paintings. He is also known for his work in church re-ordering and gilding.

'Chrysanthemums', 2009

== Life and work ==
Gillick gained a degree in Landscape Architecture from Cheltenham and Gloucester College in 1993. He is the son of Catholic activist Victoria Gillick, and theatre set designer and former UKIP county councilor Gordon Gillick.

James Gillick has an identical twin, sculptor Theodore Gillick. He is a cousin to 2002 Turner Prize nominee Liam Gillick, and his great uncle and aunt were sculptor Ernest Gillick and medallist Mary Gillick.

Gillick has a special affection for the Flemish, Dutch and Spanish masters of the 17th century, in particular Velázquez and work in the Bodegón style. Using techniques from this era, Gillick claims to handcraft all the materials he uses within his studio; including oil paints, waxes, glues, varnishes, canvases and stretchers. He uses a limited palette of six colors plus black and white, having prepared the oils from ground pigments.

In 1998 he won a commission to paint Margaret Thatcher. The three-quarter length portrait was commissioned by the University of Buckingham to commemorate her six years as the chancellor of Britain's only private university. Thatcher is recorded as having been delighted with her portrait and supposedly commented, ‘Can I thank the artist for doing the impossible – a kind portrait of me in a way I would like to be remembered.’

In 2005, a portrait of Pope John Paul II commissioned by The Bishop of Nottingham, the Rt Rev. Malcolm McMahon, was completed. The portrait, as of 2009, hung in the Lady Chapel at St Barnabas' Cathedral in Nottingham, and an identical copy toured the country's parishes on request.

'His Holiness Pope John Paul II', 2005

Gillick also completed various church restorations. This included the churches of St Gregory and St Augustine in Summertown, Oxford. This work included new reredos . Panels were painted featuring the patron saints St Augustine, St Gregory and the Virgin and child, plus a further ten panels in a type of iconostasis.

== Exhibitions ==
Gillick's work has been consistently exhibited at Jonathan Cooper's Park Walk Gallery, London since 2000. It has been included in several mixed exhibitions including; Royal Institute of Oil Painters, Mall Galleries and the Royal Society of Portrait Painters also at the Mall Galleries.

His work has also been exhibited at various art fairs including; Olympia Fine Art and Antiques Fair, BADA British Antiques and Fine Art Fair and the London Art Fair. He is often included in the annual RHS Chelsea Flower Show, the CLA Game Fair and the Burghley Horse Trials.

'Killard Point & Denvale', 2008
