= Richard Brook (chief executive) =

British businessman

Richard Brook was Chief Executive of the UK deafblind charity Sense, The National Deafblind and Rubella Association. He was appointed in July 2008 and left in September 2010. Prior to this he was Chief Executive of the Public Guardianship Office and then first Public Guardian and Chief Executive of the Office of the Public Guardian when this was established on 1 October 2007, until July 2008. He was previously the Chief Executive of Mind, the mental health charity, and has many years experience in the public and not-for-profit sectors.
