= Power of attorney =

Legal form of delegation

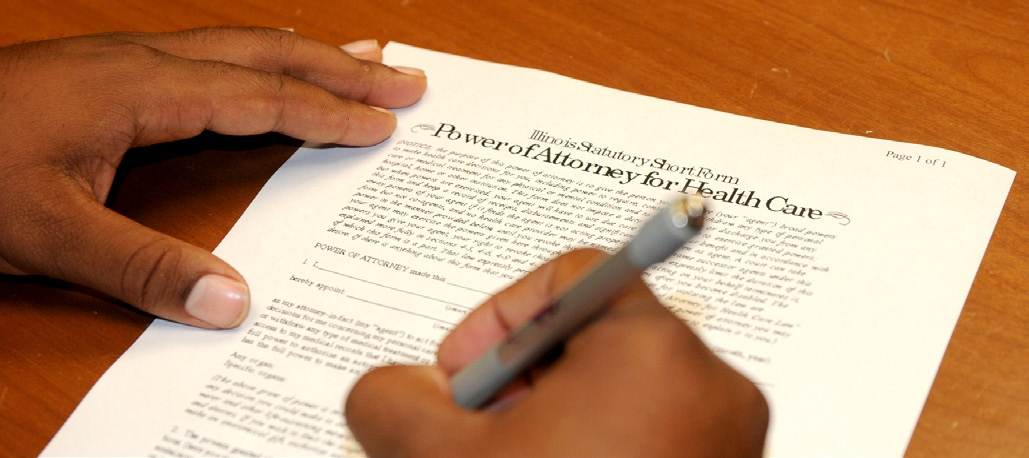
Power of attorney

A power of attorney (POA) or letter of attorney is a written authorization to represent or act on another's behalf in private affairs (which may be financial or regarding health and welfare), business, or some other legal matter. The person authorizing the other to act is the principal, grantor, or donor (of the power). The one authorized to act is the agent, attorney, or in some common law jurisdictions, the attorney-in-fact.

Formerly, the term "power" referred to an instrument signed under seal while a "letter" was an instrument under hand, meaning that it was simply signed by the parties, but today a power of attorney does not need to be signed under seal. Some jurisdictions require that powers of attorney be notarized or witnessed, but others will enforce a power of attorney as long as it is signed by the grantor.

== Attorney-in-fact ==
The term attorney-in-fact is used in many jurisdictions instead of the term agent. That term should be distinguished from the term attorney-at-law. In the United States, an attorney-at-law is a solicitor who is also licensed to be an advocate in a particular jurisdiction. An attorney-in-fact may be a layperson and is authorized to act pursuant to the powers granted by a power of attorney but may not engage in acts that would constitute the unauthorized practice of law.

In the context of the unincorporated reciprocal inter-insurance exchange (URIE) the attorney-in-fact is a stakeholder/trustee who takes custody of the subscriber funds placed on deposit with him, and then uses those funds to pay insurance claims. When all the claims are paid, the attorney-in-fact then returns the leftover funds to the subscribers.

The Uniform Power of Attorney Act employs the term agent. As an agent, an attorney-in-fact is a fiduciary for the principal, so the law requires an attorney-in-fact to be completely honest with and loyal to the principal in their dealings with each other.

An attorney has power to act on behalf of the person; this power can be misused, for example, to steal the assets of a person who may be vulnerable (e.g. elder abuse) or absent.

== Structure and requirements ==
=== Capacity of the grantor ===
A person, known as the grantor or donor in different jurisdictions, can only create a power of attorney if they have the requisite mental capacity. In some powers of attorney the grantor states that they wish the document to remain in effect even after they become incapacitated, creating a durable or lasting power of attorney. If someone is already incapacitated, it is not possible for that person to execute a valid power, although in some jurisdictions, it may be possible for someone to have the capacity to execute a power of attorney even if they do not have the capacity to make the decisions that they are delegating. If a person without a durable power in place does not have the capacity to execute a power of attorney, the only way for another party to act on their behalf may be to have a court impose a conservatorship or a guardianship.

=== Oral and written ===
Depending on the jurisdiction, a power of attorney may be oral and, whether witnessed, will hold up in court, the same as if it were in writing. For some purposes, the law requires a power of attorney to be in writing. Many institutions, such as hospitals, banks and, in the United States, the Internal Revenue Service, require a power of attorney to be in writing before they will honor it, and they will usually keep a duplicate original or a copy for their records. Nursing homes often follow the same practice.

=== Equal dignity rule ===
The equal dignity rule is a principle of law that requires an authorization for someone performing certain acts for another person to have been appointed with the same formality as required for the act the representative is going to perform. This means, for example, that if a principal authorizes someone to sell the principal's house or other real property, and the law requires a contract for the sale of real property to be in writing (which is required under the Statute of Frauds in most U.S. jurisdictions), then the authorization for the other person to sign the sales contract and deed must be in writing too. Likewise, in common-law jurisdictions other than the U.S., a power of an attorney to execute a deed (i.e. instrument under seal or executed in presence of two witnesses) must be itself executed as a deed.

=== Execution ===
For a power of attorney to become a legally enforceable document, at a minimum it must be signed and dated by the principal. Some jurisdictions also require that a power of attorney be witnessed, notarized, or both. Even when not required, having the document reviewed and signed (and often stamped) by a notary public may increase the likelihood of withstanding a legal challenge.

If the attorney-in-fact is being paid to act on behalf of the principal, a contract for payment may be separate from the document granting power of attorney. If that separate contract is in writing, as a separate document it may be kept private between the principal and agent even when the power of attorney is presented to others for the purposes of carrying out the agent's duties.

== Types ==
A power of attorney may be: special (also called limited), general, or temporary. A special power of attorney is one that is limited to a specified act or type of act. A general power of attorney is one that allows the agent to make all personal and business decisions A temporary power of attorney is one with a limited time frame. If ever required, a durable power of attorney can be revoked or changed as long as the principal is still mentally competent to act.

=== Durable ===
Under the common law, a simple power of attorney becomes ineffective if its grantor dies or becomes "incapacitated," meaning unable to grant such a power, if, for example, because of physical injury or mental illness. If the grantor (or principal) specifies that the power of attorney will continue to be effective (endure) even if the grantor becomes incapacitated, this type of power of attorney is called "power of attorney with durable provisions" in the United States or "enduring power of attorney", "lasting" or "continuing" power of attorney elsewhere. In effect, under a durable or lasting power of attorney, the authority of the attorney-in-fact to act and/or make decisions on behalf of the grantor continues until the grantor's death or the PoA is revoked.

==== Health care ====
In some jurisdictions, a durable "health care power of attorney" can be made. This particular affidavit gives the attorney-in-fact the lasting authority to make health-care decisions for the grantor, up to and including terminating care and life support. The grantor can typically modify or restrict the powers of the agent to make end-of-life decisions. In many jurisdictions a health care power of attorney is also referred to as a "health care proxy"; the two terms are sometimes used interchangeably.

Relationship with advance health care directive

Related to the health care power of attorney is a separate document known as an advance health care directive, also called a "living will". A living will is a written statement of a person's health care and medical wishes but does not appoint another person to make health care decisions. Depending upon the jurisdiction, a health care power of attorney may or may not appear with an advance health care directive in a single, physical document. For example, the California legislature has adopted a standard power of attorney for health care and advance health care directive form that meets all of that state's legal wording requirements for a power of attorney and advance health care directive in a single document. By comparison, New York enacted a Health Care Proxy law that requires a separate document to appoint someone as one's health care agent.

=== Springing ===
In some U.S. states and other jurisdictions, it is possible to grant a springing power of attorney; i.e., a power that takes effect only after the incapacity of the grantor or some other definite future act or circumstance. After such incapacitation the power is identical to a durable power, but cannot be invoked before the incapacity. This power may be used to allow a spouse or family member to manage the grantor's affairs in case illness or injury makes the grantor unable to act. If a springing power is used, the grantor should specify exactly how and when the power springs into effect. As the result of privacy legislation in the U.S., doctors of medicine will often not reveal information relating to capacity of the principal unless the power of attorney specifically authorizes them to do so.

Determining whether the principal is "disabled" enough to initiate this type of representation is a formal process. Springing powers of attorney are not automatic, and institutions may refuse to work with the attorney-in-fact. Disputes are then resolved in court.

Unless the power of attorney has been made irrevocable by its own terms or by some legal principle, the grantor may revoke the power of attorney by telling the attorney-in-fact it is revoked. However, if the principal does not inform third parties and it is reasonable for the third parties to rely upon the power of attorney being in force, the principal might still be bound by the acts of the agent, though the agent may also be liable for such unauthorized acts.

=== Standardized forms ===
Standardized forms are available for various kinds of powers of attorney, and many organizations provide them for their clients, customers, patients, employees, or members. However, the grantor should exercise caution when using a standardized POA form obtained from a source other than a lawyer because there is considerable variation in approved formats among the states. In some jurisdictions statutory power of attorney forms are available.

== Implied limitations on agent's power ==
Although a power of attorney grants the agent powers to perform acts in the absence of the grantor, the POA cannot grant powers to the agent that conflict with rules and regulations governing people and companies that the agent deals with. For example, if a bank has regulations that require the grantor to be physically present in the bank to perform certain actions, the POA cannot grant the agent power to perform those actions in the absence of the grantor.

== Specialized uses ==
=== Proxy voting ===
Robert's Rules of Order notes that proxy voting involves granting a power of attorney. The term "proxy" refers to both the power of attorney itself and the person to whom it is granted.

=== Finance ===
In financial situations wherein a principal requests a securities broker to perform extensive investment functions on the principal's behalf, independent of the principal's advice, power of attorney must be formally granted to the broker to trade in the principal's account. This rule also applies to principals who instruct their brokers to perform certain specific trades and principals who trust their brokers to perform certain trades in the principal's best interest.

== Legal status by country ==
=== Australia ===
In Australia, anyone with capacity can grant a power of attorney. This can be done either for a pre-defined period of time, or in perpetuity ("enduring"). The power of attorney can be granted to one individual, or to multiple individuals. When granted to multiple individuals, they may be authorised either to act jointly (all together) or to act severally (each can act individually).

=== Canada ===
In Canada, there are generally two types of Power of Attorney:

- Power of Attorney for Property: Allows the appointed attorney to make financial and property decisions on behalf of the grantor, such as managing bank accounts, selling property, and paying bills.
- Power of Attorney for Personal Care: Allows the appointed attorney to make decisions related to the grantor's health care and personal well-being, such as choosing a place of residence, and making decisions about medical treatment.

It is also possible to have a Combined Power of attorney which allows both the personal care and property management decisions to be taken by the attorney. The laws and regulations for Power of attorney vary by province or territory and the specific requirements for each type of Power of attorney may vary.

==== Ontario ====
In Ontario, a Power of Attorney for Property allows a person (the "grantor") to appoint another person (the "attorney") to make financial and property decisions on their behalf. This Power of Attorney for Property includes a Continuing Power of Attorney for Property (CPOA), and a non-continuing Power of Attorney. The attorney's authority can be limited or broad, and can take effect immediately or only in certain circumstances (such as the grantor becoming mentally incapable). The grantor can also revoke or cancel the Power of Attorney at any time while they still have capacity.

One can make a power of attorney document oneself for free using a web tool created by Community Legal Education Ontario or have a lawyer do it. The Power of Attorney must be in writing, signed by the grantor, and witnessed by someone other than the attorney.

If one doesn’t make a Power of Attorney, the government will not automatically step in if one can’t manage own affairs. In these circumstances a family member has the right to make your health care decisions or apply to become your “guardian” of property. Alternatively, someone else – such as a close friend - could apply to make decisions for you in these matters. The government, through the Office of the Public Guardian and Trustee (OPGT), acts only in situations where it is legally required and where no other suitable person is available, able and willing.

=== England and Wales ===
Powers of Attorney Act 1971 (Note: Section 11(1).)
- Act of Parliament
- Parliament of the United Kingdom
- Long title: An Act to make new provision in relation to powers of attorney and the delegation by trustees of their trusts, powers and discretions.
- Citation: 1971 c. 27
- Territorial extent: section 3: United Kingdom; rest of act: England and Wales; (Note: Section 11(5).)

Dates
- Royal assent: 12 May 1971
- Commencement: 1 October 1971 (Note: Section 11(4).)

Other legislation
- Amends: Trustee Act 1925; Law of Property Act 1925; Supreme Court of Judicature (Consolidation) Act 1925; Administration of Justice Act 1956
- Amended by: Statute Law Revision Act 1948; Senior Courts Act 1981; Law of Property (Miscellaneous Provisions) Act 1989; Solicitors' Incorporated Practices Order 1991; Trustee Delegation Act 1999; Statute Law (Repeals) Act 2004; Regulatory Reform (Execution of Deeds and Documents) Order 2005; Legal Services Act 2007; Powers of Attorney Act 2023

Status: Amended

Text of statute as originally enacted

Revised text of statute as amended

Text of the Powers of Attorney Act 1971 as in force today (including any amendments) within the United Kingdom, from legislation.gov.uk.

In English law, applying in England and Wales, anyone with capacity can grant a power of attorney. These can be general (i.e. to do anything which can legally be done by the donor in relation to their money or assets), or can relate to a specific act only (e.g. to sell freehold property), and are governed by the Powers of Attorney Act 1971 (c. 27). An ordinary power of attorney is only valid for so long as the donor has the mental capacity to ratify the attorney's actions.

There are also powers of attorney for trustees, governed by section 25 of the Trustee Act 1925.

If the donor become incapacitated a normal power of attorney can no longer be used. To provide for such cases a lasting power of attorney must be created. This is a separate and quite different type of power, which must be in a prescribed form, signed and witnessed in a prescribed order, and registered with the Office of the Public Guardian (OPG). This type of power of attorney was introduced in 2007 under the Mental Capacity Act 2005. It replaces the former enduring power of attorney, although enduring powers correctly made before the law changed remain valid. Enduring powers were very different, as they only needed to be registered if the donor later lost capacity.

The OPG provides an online process for registering a lasting power of attorney.

Many of the provisions in American law, described in the sections above, use terminology having different meaning from both common British usage and from the terms used in the Mental Capacity Act 2005. Examples are 'enduring power of attorney', 'advance directive', and 'notary public': in English law, these terms do not have the same meaning as they have in America.

==== Exceptional situations ====
During the coronavirus pandemic that started in 2019, England and Wales permitted documents such as wills to be witnessed via video link; however, a power of attorney still had to be signed by hand by all persons involved, in the right order, and witnessed directly, although possibly through a window or outdoors.

=== Ireland ===
In Irish law there are two types of power of attorney:

- Power of attorney, which may be general or specific, which ceases once the donor becomes mentally incapacitated. This type is virtually identical to an ordinary 1971 Act power of attorney in England and Wales.
- Enduring power of attorney, which takes effect once the donor is incapacitated

The death of the donor ends both.

The relevant legislation is the Powers of Attorney Act 1996 and the Enduring Powers of Attorney Regulations 1996 (SI No. 196/1996) as amended by SI No. 287/1996. Part 7 of the Assisted Decision-Making (Capacity) Act 2015 provides for new arrangements for those who wish to make an Enduring Power of Attorney and once the 2015 Act is brought into force, no new powers of attorney will be created under the 1996 Act.

==== Creating powers of attorney ====
A solicitor is not required to create a Power of Attorney - it is created simply by being signed by the donor, in the presence of (and countersigned by) a witness.

Creating an Enduring Power of Attorney requires the following:

- it must be in a particular format
- a statement from a doctor stating that the doctor thought the donor had the mental capacity to understand the effect of creating the power of attorney when the document was executed
- a statement from the donor to say that they understood the effect of creating the power
- a statement from a solicitor to say they are satisfied that the donor understood the effect of creating the power of attorney
- a statement from a solicitor to say the donor was not acting under undue influence

The courts play a general supervisory role in the implementation of the power.

=== Russia ===
Under Russian law, in article 185 of the Russian Civil Code, a power of attorney can be created by being signed by the donor. Creation of the power of attorney must be witnessed, e.g. countersigned by a public notary. Notarial witnessing is mandatory if the power of attorney is made in order to enter into a contract to buy or sell an interest in land, as this has to be done on a public register.

A power of attorney must also be dated, pursuant to article 186 of the Russian Civil Code. Any POA without an express date of execution is void.

A power of attorney cannot be irrevocable. The grantor may terminate the POA at any time, at his or her sole discretion. Any waiver of this right is void, as provided by the Civil Code.

See Doverennost (in Russian)

=== Scotland ===
The law in Scotland is broadly similar to that of England and Wales.

Scottish practice differs from England in one respect. In Scotland, the Office of the Public Guardian offers eAttorney, the Electronic Power of Attorney (EPOAR) system, for the submission and payment of a power of attorney registration.

== See also ==
- Cestui que
- Delegata potestas non potest delegari
- Estate planning
- Will and testament
- Legal guardian
