= R v Bournewood Community and Mental Health NHS Trust =

UK legal case

In R v Bournewood Community and Mental Health NHS Trust, the House of Lords ruled in 1998 that a man who had been admitted to a psychiatric hospital without capable consent had not been unlawfully detained under the common law. A later European Court of Human Rights ruling, however, found that the man had been unlawfully deprived of his liberty in the meaning of Article 5 of the European Convention on Human Rights.

== Facts ==
HL was an adult male who was autistic and had profound learning disabilities. He had lived in Bournewood Hospital from the age of 13 for over thirty years. In 1994 he was discharged into the community to live in an adult foster placement with carers Mr and Mrs 'E'. On 22 July 1997 HL became agitated at a day centre he attended and was given a sedative. As he remained agitated he was admitted to the Accident and Emergency Department at Bournewood Hospital. HL was compliant and did not resist admission, so doctors judged that he did not require detention under the Mental Health Act 1983. HL never attempted to leave the hospital, but his carers were prevented from visiting him until November 1997. A report by the Health Service Ombudsman heard evidence from a range of professionals that the standard of HL's care had been poor in the hospital, and he had become distressed and agitated. Mr and Mrs 'E' sought from the court a judicial review of the decision of the Bournewood Community and Mental Health NHS Trust "to detain the appellant on 22 July 1997 and the Trust's ongoing decision to continue the Appellant's retention" and a writ of Habeas corpus to direct that HL be discharged and returned to their care.

== Judgment ==
=== Appeals ===
In September 1997, HL, via his cousin and next friend, applied to the High Court for leave to apply for a judicial review of his admission to hospital, a writ of habeas corpus, and compensatory damages for false imprisonment. The High Court refused the application, finding that HL had not been detained in hospital but rather had been admitted informally, and that the common law doctrine of necessity had been satisfied.

In October 1997, the Court of Appeal indicated however that they were likely to decide the case in HL's favour, and he was subsequently detained under section 3 of the Mental Health Act on 31st October 1997, eventually being discharged on 12 December that year, after treating psychiatrists decided that he no longer required assessment or treatment in hospital.

On 2 December 1997, the Court of Appeal issued their ruling, holding that the actions of the Trust had been based on a false premise that they were "entitled to treat L as an in-patient without his consent as long as he did not dissent." On the question of whether the applicant was “detained”, the Court of Appeal noted that this was a question of objective fact which did not depend on the presence or absence of consent. The Court considered that a person was detained in law if those who had control over the premises in which he was situated intended that he should not be permitted to leave and had the ability to prevent him doing so. The court held that HL should have been detained under the Mental Health Act 1983, as the common law only provided for situations not already encompassed by statute. The Court also commented that a troubling feature of the appeal was that the respondent Trust was not alone in misinterpreting the Act, and potentially the judgement could apply to many patients informally detained like HL. They stated that the practice of informal detention in cases like HL could not justify disregarding the Mental Health Act, especially in light of this bypassing its safeguards to detained patients.

=== House of Lords ===
The Court of Appeal decision was appealed to the House of Lords, at the time the highest court in the UK [the Supreme Court not being established until 2009]. The House of Lords heard evidence from the Mental Health Act Commission that the ruling of the Court of Appeal would result in an additional 48,000 patients per year having to be detained under the Mental Health Act. The House of Lords gave judgment on 25 June 1998 and unanimously allowed the appeal, ruling that the admission of incapacitous but compliant patients could be been justified on the basis of the common law doctrine of necessity and that HL had not been unlawfully detained. In assessing whether HL had been detained, they concluded by a majority verdict that he had not been detained in the meaning of the common law tort of false imprisonment because there must be actual and not just potential restraint. They noted that HL was on an unlocked ward and had never attempted to leave the hospital, and that he was compliant with the care he was being provided. Some commentators have suggested this reasoning might be at odds with other false imprisonment precedents. Lord Steyn dissented from this aspect of the judgement, noting that HL was repeatedly administered sedative medication in hospital, and stating that the Trust's argument that HLwas always free to go 'stretched credulity to breaking point' and was 'a fairytale'. Unanimously their Lordships also held that even if HL had been found to have been detained, it would have been justified under the common law doctrine of necessity. Although Lord Steyn felt that HL had been deprived of his liberty, he nonetheless ruled that this detention was justified under the common law doctrine of necessity, and that he had not been unlawfully detained. He commented that this was an 'unfortunate' result as it left compliant but incapacitated patients without the safeguards of patients detained formally under the Mental Health Act.

=== European Court of Human Rights ===
Although HL was in fact released back into the care of Mr. and Mrs. E in December 1997 after being held in hospital for five months, the case was pursued at the European Court of Human Rights (ECtHR) for a declaration that HL had been deprived of his liberty unlawfully in the meaning of Article 5 of the European Convention on Human Rights ('the Convention'). The ECtHR concurred with Lord Steyn that HL had in fact been detained, finding that the distinction relied upon by the House of Lords between actual and potential restraint was not 'of central importance under the Convention'. They further found that the common law doctrine of necessity did not provide the requisite safeguards for informal detention of compliant but incapacitated patients to be described as 'in accordance with a procedure described by law' as required under Article 5(1)(e).

== Response of the UK government to 'the Bournewood judgment' ==
Following the ruling of the ECtHR, the UK government launched a widespread consultation about the potential consequences of 'the Bournewood judgment', as it became known. During this consultation it was considered that compliant but incapacitated adults in care homes, as well as hospitals, might be deprived of their liberty in the meaning of the Convention. This consultation resulted in the amendment of the Mental Capacity Act 2005 to contain the 'deprivation of liberty safeguards'. The deprivation of liberty safeguards were intended to plug the 'Bournewood gap' by providing administrative and judicial safeguards for adults who lack mental capacity who are deprived of their liberty in care homes and hospitals. The safeguards came into force in April 2009, but their uptake has not been as widespread as expected and their implementation has been subject to criticism from a wide range of interested parties.

== See also ==
- False imprisonment
- European Convention on Human Rights
- HL v United Kingdom (2004)
- Mental Capacity Act 2005
- Mental Health Act 1983
- Mental Health Act 2007
