= Secretary of the Department of Health and Community Services v JWB =

Marion's Case
- Court: High Court of Australia
- Full case name: Secretary, Department of Health and Community Services v JWB and SMB
- Decided: 6 May 1992
- Citations: [1992] HCA 15, (1992) 175 CLR 218

Case history
- Prior action: Re Marion (No 2) (1992) 17 Fam LR 336
- Appealed from: Family Court (Full Court)

Court membership
- Judges sitting: Mason CJ, Brennan, Deane, Dawson, Toohey, Gaudron & McHugh JJ

Case opinions
- (4:3) the decision to sterilize an intellectually disabled minor falls outside the ordinary scope of parental powers (per Mason CJ, Dawson, Toohey & Gaudron JJ.) (6:1) the Family Court had jurisdiction to decide whether sterilization was in the best interests of the child (per Mason CJ, Deane, Dawson, Toohey, Gaudron & McHugh JJ.)

Secretary of the Department of Health and Community Services v JWB and SMB, commonly known as Marion's Case, is a leading decision of the High Court of Australia, concerning whether a child has the capacity to make decisions for themselves, and when this is not possible, who may make decisions for them regarding major medical procedures. It largely adopts the views in Gillick v West Norfolk Area Health Authority, a decision of the House of Lords in England and Wales.

== Background ==
"Marion", a pseudonym for the 14-year-old girl at the centre of this case, suffered from intellectual disabilities, severe deafness, epilepsy and other disorders. Her parents, a married couple from the Northern Territory sought an order from the Family Court of Australia authorising them to have Marion undergo a hysterectomy and an oophrectomy (removal of ovaries). The practical effect would be sterilisation and preventing Marion from being able to have children and many of the hormonal effects of adulthood.

Under the Family Law Act the primary concern for matters involving children is that the court must act in the child's best interests. The majority of the High Court made it clear that it was merely deciding a point of law and that the decision about what was in the child's "best interests" would be left to the Family Court of Australia after the case.

The main legal debate that arose was who has the legal authority to authorise the operation. Three options existed: the parents (as legal guardians of their daughter), Marion or an order of a competent court, such as the Family Court of Australia. The Full Court of the Family Court was asked to decide:

1. Could the parents, as joint guardians authorize the sterilization procedure;
2. If not, does the Family Court have jurisdiction to:
(a) authorize the carrying out of such a procedure;
(b) enlarge the powers, rights or duties of the parents to enable them to authorize such a procedure; or
(c) approve the consent of the Applicants, as to the proposed procedure.

The majority of the Family Court, Strauss and McCall JJ held that the parents, as joint guardians could authorize the sterilization procedure. Nicholson CJ held that the Family Court had jurisdiction to authorize the procedure.

The department, together with the Attorney-General for Australia, argued that only a court could authorize such a major operation and that the Family Court jurisdiction included any matter relating to the welfare of a child even if it was not a dispute about custody, guardianship or access.

The parents, however, "argued that the decision to sterilise a child is not significantly different from other major decisions that parents and guardians have to make for children and that the involvement of the Family Court is optional and only of a 'supervisory nature'. Their argument was that, provided such a procedure is in the best interests of the child, parents as guardians can give lawful consent to a sterilisation on behalf of a mentally incompetent child."

== Judgment ==
The High Court recognised the right of everyone to bodily integrity under national and international law, and made a distinction between therapeutic and non-therapeutic surgical procedures as well as the duty of surrogates to act in the best interests of the incompetent patient.

In the case, the High Court ruled that while parents may consent to medical treatment for their children, the authority does not extend to treatment not in the child's best interests. Also, the Court held that if medical treatment has sterilisation as its principal objective, parents do not have the authority to consent on behalf of their child.

== Obiter dictum ==
The statement by Deane J that parents may grant surrogate consent for the non-therapeutic circumcision of male children is obiter dictum and not part of the judgment. Male circumcision was not at issue in the case and no evidence or testimony was offered regarding male circumcision.

Similarly to Re Paul [2008]

== See also ==
- E. (Mrs.) v. Eve
- Mature minor doctrine
- Gillick competence (UK)
- Informed consent
- Age of consent
