= Gillick competence =

Medical legal term

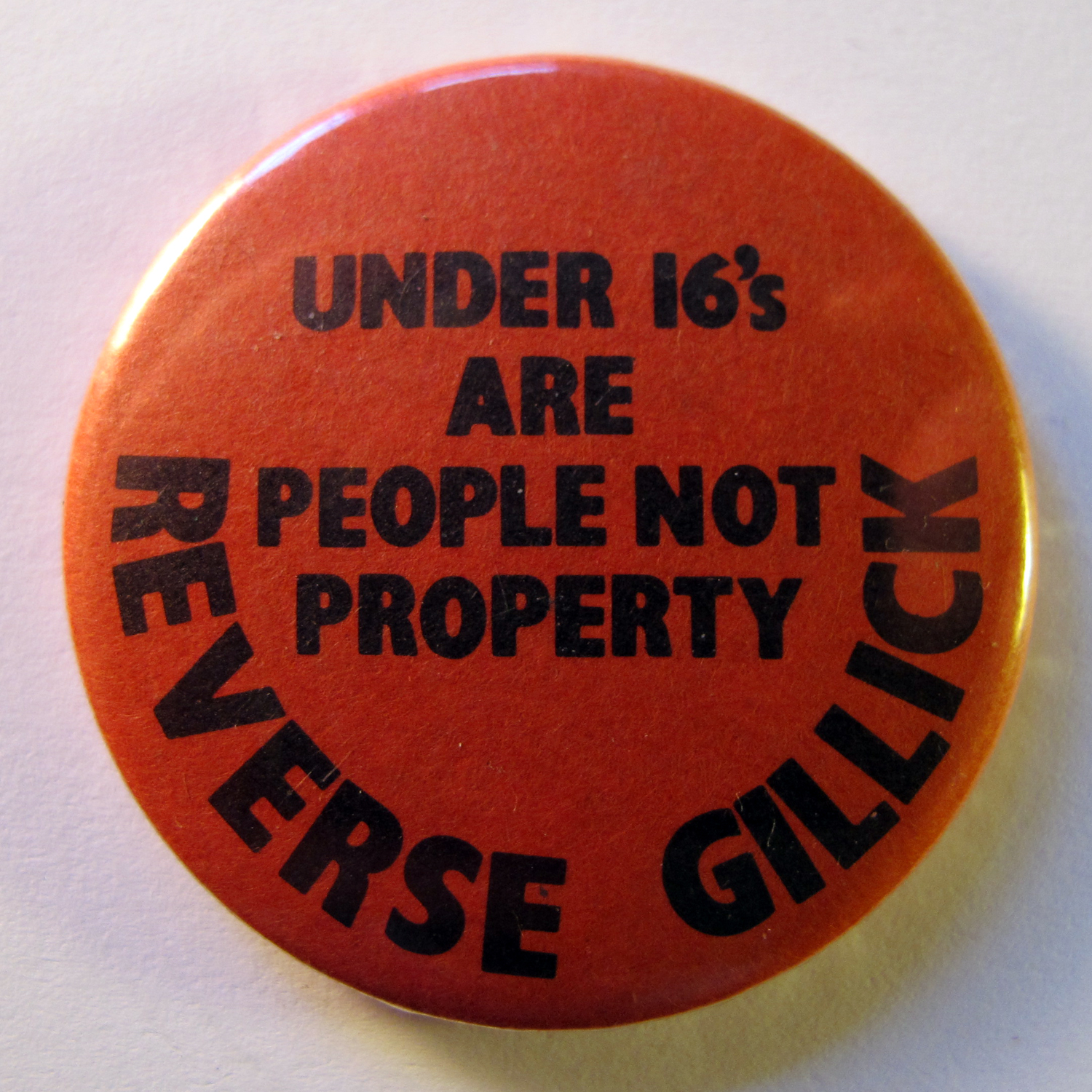
Badge worn by some in protest against Gillick's campaign in the early 1980s. Here, the call to "Reverse Gillick" refers to reversing the Court of Appeal judgment, not the subsequent House of Lords judgment that overturned it.

Gillick competence is a term originating in England and Wales and is used in medical law to decide whether a child (a person under 16 years of age) is able to consent to their own medical treatment, without the need for parental permission or knowledge.

The standard is based on the 1985 judicial decision of the House of Lords with respect to a case of the contraception advice given by an NHS doctor in Gillick v West Norfolk and Wisbech Area Health Authority. The case is binding in England and Wales, and has been adopted to varying extents in Australia, Canada, and New Zealand. Similar provision is made in Scotland by the Age of Legal Capacity (Scotland) Act 1991. In Northern Ireland, although separate legislation applies, the then Department of Health and Social Services stated that there was no reason to suppose that the House of Lords' decision would not be followed by the Northern Ireland courts.

== The Gillick decision ==
Gillick's case involved a health departmental circular advising doctors on contraception for people under 16. The circular stated that the prescription of contraception was a matter for the doctor's discretion and that they could be prescribed to under-16s without parental consent. This matter was litigated because Victoria Gillick ran an active campaign against the policy. Gillick sought a declaration that prescribing contraception was illegal because the doctor would commit an offence of encouraging sex with a minor and that it would be treatment without consent as consent vested in the parent; she was unsuccessful before the High Court of Justice, but succeeded in the Court of Appeal.

The issue before the House of Lords was only whether the minor involved could give consent. "Consent" here was considered in the broad sense of consent to battery or assault: in the absence of patient consent to treatment, a doctor, even if well-intentioned, might be sued/charged.

The House of Lords focused on the issue of consent rather than a notion of 'parental rights' or parental power. In fact, the court held that 'parental rights' did not exist, other than to safeguard the best interests of a minor. The majority held that in some circumstances a minor could consent to treatment, and that in these circumstances a parent had no power to veto treatment, building on the judgement by Lord Denning in Hewer v Bryant that parental rights were diminishing as the age of a child increases.

Lord Scarman and Lord Fraser proposed slightly different tests (Lord Bridge agreed with both). Lord Scarman's test is generally considered to be the test of 'Gillick competency'. He required that a child could consent if they fully understood the medical treatment that is proposed:

As a matter of law the parental right to determine whether or not their minor child below the age of sixteen will have medical treatment terminates if and when the child achieves sufficient understanding and intelligence to understand fully what is proposed.

— Lord Scarman

While it is believed that Gillick competency may apply to all matters involving whether a child is able to understanding something enough to be able to consent, it has been clarified in recent case law that Gillick only applies to consent for treatment.

== Subsequent developments ==
A child who is deemed "Gillick competent" is able to prevent their parents viewing their medical records. Thus medical staff will not make a disclosure of medical records of a child who is deemed "Gillick competent" unless consent is manifest.

The nature of the standard remains uncertain. However, case law and discussion following the decision add clarification on what Lord Scarman meant in different clinical contexts. The aim of Gillick competence is to reflect the transition of a child to adulthood with the degree of maturity and intelligence needed depending on the gravity of the decision (see Re R below).

As of May 2016, it appeared to Funston and Howard—two researchers working on health education—that some recent legislation worked explicitly to restrict the ability of Gillick competent children to consent to medical treatment outside of clinical settings. For example, parental consent is required for the treatment of children with asthma using standby salbutamol inhalers in schools. These restrictions have yet to be tested in court.

=== R and W ===
The decisions In re R (1991) and Re W (1992) (especially Lord Donaldson) contradict the Gillick decision somewhat in the sense that while Gillick competency gives a child the ability to consent to medical treatment, it does not necessarily give them power to refuse medical treatment. From these, and subsequent cases, it is suggested that although the parental right to veto treatment ends, parental powers do not "terminate" as suggested by Lord Scarman in Gillick, only that children with Gillick competency can consent to medical treatment in the absence of parental consent. This means that those with parental responsibility remain able to consent to their children receiving medical treatment even if the child has Gillick competency and does not consent. Also, the parens patriae jurisdiction of the court remains available allowing a court order to force treatment against a child's (and parent's) wishes.

=== Axon ===
In a 2006 judicial review, R (on the application of Axon) v Secretary of State for Health, the High Court affirmed Gillick in allowing for medical confidentiality for teenagers seeking an abortion. The court rejected a claim that not granting parents a "right to know" whether their child had sought an abortion, birth control or contraception breached Article 8 of the European Convention on Human Rights. The Axon case set out a list of criteria that a doctor must meet when deciding whether to provide treatment to an under-16 child without informing their parents: they must be convinced that they can understand all aspects of the advice, that the patient's physical or mental health is likely to suffer without medical advice, that it is in the best interests of the patient to provide medical advice, that (in provision of contraception) they are likely to have sex whether contraception is provided or not, and that they have made an effort to convince the young person to disclose the information to their parents.

=== 2020s ===
In late 2020, Bell v Tavistock considered whether under-16s with gender dysphoria could be Gillick competent to consent to receiving puberty blockers. Due to the unique specifics of that treatment, the High Court concluded that in such cases the answer will almost always be 'no', a priori. In late 2021, the Court of Appeal overturned Bell v Tavistock, as the clinic's policies and practices had not been found to be unlawful.

During the COVID-19 pandemic, government guidance was circulated stating that some older children in secondary school would be considered Gillick competent to decide to be vaccinated against COVID-19 when a parent/guardian has not consented. The Green Book, the UK's guidance on immunisation, states that under 16s "who understand fully what is involved in the proposed procedure" can consent "although ideally their parents will be involved".

== Australian law ==
In 1992, the High Court of Australia gave specific and strong approval for the application of Gillick competence in Secretary of the Department of Health and Community Services v JWB (1992) 175 CLR 189, also known as Marrion's Case. This decision introduced Gillick competence as Australian common law, and has been applied in similar cases such as Department of Community Services v Y (1999) NSWSC 644.

There is no express authority in Australia on In re R and Re W, so whether or not a parent's right terminates when Gillick competence is applied is unclear. This lack of authority reflects that the reported cases have all involved minors who have been found to be incompetent, and that Australian courts will make decisions in the parens patriae jurisdiction regardless of Gillick competence.

== Confusion regarding Gillick competence ==
On 21 May 2009, confusion arose between Gillick competence, which identifies under-16s with the capacity to consent to their own treatment, and the Fraser guidelines, which are concerned only with contraception and focus on the desirability of parental involvement and the risks of unprotected sex in that area.

A persistent rumour arose that Victoria Gillick disliked having her name associated with the assessment of children's capacity, but an editorial in the BMJ from 2006 claimed that Gillick said that she "has never suggested to anyone, publicly or privately, that [she] disliked being associated with the term 'Gillick competent'".

== Fraser guidelines ==
It is lawful for doctors to provide contraceptive advice and treatment without parental consent providing certain criteria are met. These criteria, known as the Fraser guidelines, were laid down by Lord Fraser in the Gillick decision and require the professional to be satisfied that:

- the young person will understand the professional's advice;
- the young person cannot be persuaded to inform their parents;
- the young person is likely to begin, or to continue having, sexual intercourse with or without contraceptive treatment;
- unless the young person receives contraceptive treatment, their physical or mental health, or both, are likely to suffer;
- the young person's best interests require them to receive contraceptive advice or treatment with or without parental consent.

Although these criteria specifically refer to contraception, the principles are deemed to apply to other treatments, including abortion. Although the judgment in the House of Lords referred specifically to doctors, it is considered by the Royal College of Obstetricians and Gynaecologists (RCOG) to apply to other health professionals, "including general practitioners, gynaecologists, nurses, and practitioners in community contraceptive clinics, sexual health clinics and hospital services".

If a person under the age of 18 refuses to consent to treatment, it is possible in some cases for their parents or the courts to overrule their decision. However, this right can be exercised only on the basis that the welfare of the young person is paramount. In this context, welfare does not simply mean their physical health. The psychological effect of having the decision overruled would have to be taken into account and would normally be an option only when the young person was thought likely to suffer "grave and irreversible mental or physical harm". Usually, when a parent wants to overrule a young person's decision to refuse treatment, health professionals will apply to the courts for a final decision.

An interesting aside to the Fraser guidelines is that many regard Lord Scarman's judgment as the leading judgement in the case, but because Lord Fraser's judgement was shorter and set out in more specific terms – and in that sense more accessible to health and welfare professionals – it is his judgement that has been reproduced as containing the core principles, as for example cited in the RCOG circular.

== Gillick competence in the research context ==
The idea of Gillick competence was adopted by some to mean that minors could consent to take part in medical and psychological research without parental consent. The HRA have used the lack of case law to mean that Gillick competency applies in a research setting. A recent Appeal Court ruling, however, has stated that Gillick competence applies only to decisions about medical treatment. This has meant that researchers in the UK have had to review the way they conduct research on minors.

== See also ==
- Age of consent
- Dignity of risk
- Informed consent
- Mature minor doctrine
- Mental capacity in England and Wales
