= Ian Fraser, Baron Fraser of Tullybelton =

British judge

Walter Ian Reid Fraser, Baron Fraser of Tullybelton, PC (3 February 1911 – 17 February 1989) was a British judge.

== Life and career ==
Ian Fraser was born in Glasgow on 3 February 1911, the eldest child of Alexander Reid Fraser, a Glasgow fur merchant, and his wife Margaret Russell MacFarlane. On 23 November 1914, his sister Helen Cross Reid Fraser was born. Fraser was educated at Sandroyd School, Repton School and later studied Philosophy, Politics and Economics at Balliol College, Oxford, graduating in 1932 with First Class Honours. He finished his studies at the University of Glasgow with a Bachelor of Laws in 1935. The following year he was admitted to the Scottish Faculty of Advocates, where he soon earned a reputation as an excellent jurist. At the same time he held a teaching post at the University of Glasgow and from 1948 at the University of Edinburgh. His 1938 work "An Outline of Constitutional Law" (2nd edition 1948) was soon regarded as the standard work on British constitutional law.

During the war he served first as a sergeant in an anti-aircraft battery of the Territorial Army. Later he transferred to the Royal Artillery, was promoted to the rank of major and served in the theatre of war in Burma. In 1945 he was appointed Advocate Depute and eventually rose to be the Home Depute in the Crown Office. In 1953 he was appointed QC. In 1954 he served on the Scottish Law Reform Committee and from 1960 to 1962 on the Royal Commission on the Police. From 1959 to 1964 he served as Dean of the Faculty of Advocates. From 1964 to 1974, he was a Senator of the College of Justice and had the judicial courtesy title of Lord Fraser. In 1974 he was appointed to the Privy Council, and on 13 January 1975 was created a life peer with the title Baron Fraser of Tullybelton, of Bankfoot in the County of Perth, and took the office of Lord of Appeal in Ordinary.

Fraser was a very active member of the House of Lords and dealt primarily with issues of further development of the administration of justice. Even in his retirement, he was a chairman of the University Commission on the reform of higher education. He died on 17 February 1989 in a car crash on the M90 motorway between Perth and Edinburgh during a snow storm.

== Awards and honours ==
Fraser was a member of the Royal Company of Archers. In 1975 he was appointed honorary chairman of the administrative committee of Gray's Inn, where he was an Honorary Bencher. In 1981 he was made an Honorary Fellow of Balliol College. He was awarded honorary doctorates (Legum Doctor) at the University of Glasgow in 1970 and at the University of Edinburgh in 1978.

== Family ==
On 8 November 1943 Fraser married Mary Ursula Cynthia Gwendolen Macdonnell, daughter of Colonel Ian Harrison Macdonnell, with whom he had a son, Andrew.

== Judgments ==
Lord Fraser overturned, along with Lord Edmund-Davies, Lord Roskill, Lord Brandon, and Lord Templeman, the Mandla v Dowell-Lee judgment by Lord Denning in the House of Lords, where he held the following with respect to the Race Relations Act 1976:

For a group to constitute an ethnic group in the sense of the 1976 Act, it must, in my opinion, regard itself, and be regarded by others, as a distinct community by virtue of certain characteristics. Some of these characteristics are essential; others are not essential but one or more of them will commonly be found and will help to distinguish the group from the surrounding community. The conditions which appear to me to be essential are these: (1) a long shared history, of which the group is conscious as distinguishing it from other groups, and the memory of which it keeps alive; (2) a cultural tradition of its own, including family and social customs and manners, often but not necessarily associated with religious observance. In addition to those two essential characteristics the following characteristics are, in my opinion, relevant: (3) either a common geographical origin, or descent from a small number of common ancestors; (4) a common language, not necessarily peculiar to the group; (5) a common literature peculiar to the group; (6) a common religion different from that of neighbouring groups or from the general community surrounding it; (7) being a minority or being an oppressed or a dominant group within a larger community, for example a conquered people (say, the inhabitants of England shortly after the Norman conquest) and their conquerors might both be ethnic groups.

He went on to approve the test set out by Richardson, J. in the County Court, which held that Sikhs were a racial or ethnic group:

"... a group is identifiable in terms of its ethnic origins if it is a segment of the population distinguished from others by a sufficient combination of shared customs, beliefs, traditions and characteristics derived from a common or presumed common past, even if not drawn from what in biological terms is a common racial stock. It is that combination which gives them an historically determined social identity in their own eyes and in the eyes of those outside the group. They have a distinct social identity based not simply on group cohesion and solidarity but also on their belief as to their historical antecedents."

He was one of 5 judges in the famous Gillick case. In fact, the guidelines were framed by him, and are still known as Fraser Guidelines.

== In popular culture ==
In the 2021 mini-series A Very British Scandal, Fraser was played by Nicholas Rowe.

== Notes ==
- Leigh Rayment's Peerage Pages
