= Refusal of medical assistance =

Situation when a patient refuses any or all parts of medical treatment

Refusal of Medical Assistance (RMA) is a term used in emergency medical services (EMS) to describe situations where a patient declines some or all medical treatment in the pre-hospital setting, such as during an ambulance response. In some parts of the United States, it is known as “patient refusal”, Refusal of Medical Aid (RMA), or Patient-Initiated Refusal (PIR).

The concept of RMA is specific to EMS and involves patients choosing not to receive care during an ambulance or emergency medical response. It is part of a broader phenomenon of patients refusing, delaying, or limiting medical treatments, which can also occur in other medical settings, such as hospitals or clinics. In some systems in the United States, pre-hospital refusal of medical assistance rates as high as 26% have been reported.

== Background ==
Refusal of Medical Assistance (RMA) is a process that ensures the continuum of care in emergency medical services (EMS), aligning with the responsibilities of ambulance squads. In a typical emergency call, the ambulance service will assess and transport the patient to an appropriate facility. The ambulance squad's duty towards the patient begins with patient contact and generally ends with transfer to the emergency department of the receiving hospital.

However, emergency calls may terminate in other ways. For example, an ambulance service may cancel their own services if the patient becomes violent, compromising scene safety. Services may also be canceled by on-scene personnel, such as the police or, in the case of a Intensive Care Unit (MICU) service, the on-scene Basic Life Support (BLS) Emergency medical technician (EMT)). Additionally, a dispatcher may redirect the call to another ambulance better positioned to take the call.

In general, once patient contact has been established, the ambulance service must either transport or obtain an appropriate refusal from the patient.

== Types ==
There are three general types of Refusal of Medical Assistance (RMA), designated by scope:

- Complete Refusal: The patient refuses to be evaluated by EMS entirely.
- Evaluation with Refusal: The patient allows EMS to perform an evaluation, including vital signs and an assessment, before refusing further care or transport.
- Partial Refusal: The patient consents to some aspects of care but refuses specific actions, such as C-spine precautions.

== Uses ==
Refusal of Medical Assistance (RMA) policies dictate that ambulance services typically cannot independently release a patient without a medical evaluation at a hospital. Determining whether a patient requires further care is generally the responsibility of a physician. However, in cases where it is apparent that transport is unnecessary, emergency medical services (EMS) personnel may informally guide the patient toward signing an RMA form.

Refusal of Medical Assistance (RMA) is particularly well-suited for situations where immediate medical intervention is unnecessary. For example, a minor cut or bruise or uninjured parties in a motor vehicle accident. It can also be used where non-critical transport is advised, but it would be counterproductive to take the party by ambulance. For instance, an injured but frightened child might be better comforted and transported to a hospital or doctor’s office by a parent instead of an ambulance crew.

In general, ambulance squads are unable to contravene the wishes of a mentally competent patient. This may lead to situations of likely cardiac compromise, likely internal trauma, or other life-threatening situations. However, if the patient is of sound mind, they are generally able to refuse treatment. The EMS provider has limited options at this point, since EMS generally cannot restrain and take a person involuntarily.

However, depending on local policy, the police may be able to place the patient in protective custody. This action, which involves essentially detaining the individual and releasing them to the EMS agency for medical evaluation, is a measure that should only be taken in extreme circumstances. When a patient refuses care under these conditions, the situation is often classified as “Refusal of Medical Assistance Against Medical Advice” (RMA-AMA) to distinguish it from a standard RMA, which usually applies to non-urgent cases or trivial calls.

== Issues with refusal ==
Refusal of Medical Assistance (RMA) is guided by the principle of informed consent, meaning patients must fully understand what they are refusing and the potential consequences of their decision. This ensures that only those capable of making informed decisions—mentally competent individuals—can refuse treatment. Patients who are intoxicated or otherwise incapable of understanding the implications of their refusal, such as those with cognitive impairments, cannot legally provide informed consent. Allowing such individuals to refuse treatment could result in serious risks to their health.

For similar reasons, minors (those under the age of 18) are generally unable to refuse medical care. In these circumstances, the EMS crew may choose to wait for a parent or legal guardian, who has the authority to make medical decisions on behalf of the child.

When a parent refuses medical care for their child, this differs from an adult’s refusal of medical assistance because the decision is not made by the patient (the child) but by the parent or legal guardian acting on the child’s behalf.

== Documenting the refusal ==
Ideally, the refusal is a form provided by and filled out by the agency and signed by multiple parties - usually the EMS agency itself, the patient (or his legal proxy or guardian), and a witness (ideally a family member or police officer). A copy is attached to the patient care report or otherwise secured and retained by the agency, and another copy is usually given to the patient.

The patient is advised of the risks of refusal, including the fact that their condition may worsen, and advised to call 9-1-1 or the emergency number without hesitation if they feel the need.

== See also ==
- Emergency medical services
- Informed refusal
- Patients' rights
- Physician Orders for Life-Sustaining Treatment
