= Informed refusal =

Informed refusal is where a person has refused a recommended medical treatment based upon an understanding of the facts and implications of not following the treatment. Informed refusal is linked to the informed consent process, as a patient has a right to consent, but also may choose to refuse.

The individual needs to be in possession of the relevant facts as well as of their reasoning faculties, such as not being intellectually disabled or mentally ill and without an impairment of judgment at the time of refusing. Such impairments might include illness, intoxication, drunkenness, using drugs, insufficient sleep, and other health problems. In cases where an individual is considered unable to give informed refusal, another person (guardian) may be authorized to give consent on their behalf. The concept grew out of and is similar to that of informed consent, but much less commonly used and applied. In the United States, it is recognized in certain state laws (in 2006: California, Nevada, Vermont, and Michigan) as well as in various court decisions.

As applied in the medical field, a physician has made an assessment of a patient and finds a specific test, intervention, or treatment is medically necessary. The patient refuses to consent to this recommendation. The physician then needs to explain the risks of not following through with the recommendations to allow the patient to make an informed decision against the recommendation. While in the past documentation of refusal of treatment has not been important, the widespread use of managed care, cost containment processes, as well as increased patient autonomy have created a situation where documented "informed refusal" is viewed as becoming more important. When refusal of treatment may result in significant damage or death, the interaction needs to be documented to protect the care giver in a potential later litigation against the allegation that the recommendation was either not made or not understood. On occasion, a patient will also refuse to sign the "informed refusal" document, in which case a witness would have to sign that the informed process and the refusal took place.

The pregnant patient represents a specific dilemma in the field of informed refusal as her action may result in harm or death to the fetus. Ethicists disagree on how to handle this situation.

== See also ==
- Refusal of medical assistance
- Passive euthanasia
- Right to die
- Advance healthcare directive
