= HL v United Kingdom =

European Court of Human Rights 2004 decision

H.L. v. the United Kingdom
- Court: European Court of Justice
- Decided: 5 October 2004
- Citation: 45508/99 [2004] ECHR 720

In the case HL v United Kingdom (45508/99) the European Court of Human Rights found that the informal admission to a psychiatric hospital of a compliant but incapacitated adult was in contravention of Article 5 of the European Convention on Human Rights. The court found that the distinction between actual and potential detention relied upon by the UK House of Lords in their ruling that HL had not been detained in R v Bournewood Community and Mental Health NHS Trust was not of central importance under Article 5. The European Court also held that the practice of informal admission of compliant but incapacitated adults who were de facto detained was not 'in accordance with a procedure described by law' and thus was not lawful under the Convention.

The case resulted in major changes to the admission procedures for incapacitated adults to care homes and hospitals in the UK where they are, or may be, deprived of their liberty (see Deprivation of Liberty Safeguards).

== See also ==
- European Court of Human Rights
- European Convention of Human Rights
- R v Bournewood Community and Mental Health NHS Trust
- Involuntary commitment
- Mental Capacity Act 2005
