= Victoria Gillick =

British activist and campaigner (born 1946)

- Born: Victoria D. M. Gudgeon; 1946 (age 79–80); Hendon, England
- Known for: Legal action which she lost in the 1985 UK House of Lords ruling which became known as the "Gillick competence" test
- Spouse: Gordon Gillick
- Children: 10, including James

Victoria D. M. Gillick (née Gudgeon; born 1946, in Hendon) is a British activist and campaigner best known for the eponymous 1985 UK House of Lords ruling that considered whether contraception could be prescribed to under-16s without parental consent or knowledge. The ruling established the term "Gillick competence" to describe whether a young person below the age of 16 is able to consent to their own medical treatment, without the need for parental permission or knowledge.

A Roman Catholic mother of 10 children (five sons, five daughters), Gillick began her campaign in 1980 in response to a DHSS circular issuing guidance on contraceptive stating a minor could consent to treatment, and that in these circumstances a parent had no power to veto treatment.

In 1982, she sued West Norfolk and Wisbech Area Health Authority for refusing to agree that they would never provide contraceptive advice or technologies to her daughters without parental consent while they were below the age of sixteen. Mr Justice Woolf ruled in favour of the Health Authority. Gillick won an initial appeal but the final judgement of the House of Lords, given by Lord Scarman, upheld the decision in favour of the Health Authority.

In 2000, Gillick lost a libel action against the Brook Advisory Centres, which she claimed accused her of being "morally responsible" for a rise in teenage pregnancies. Costs of £4,298.15 were awarded against her. In 2002, however, she won an apology and damages amounting to £5,000 and costs.

Living in Wisbech, she is married to Cambridgeshire County Councillor and former UKIP councillor Gordon Gillick. One of their sons is the painter James Gillick.
