= William Charles (judge) =

English Judge

Sir Arthur William Hessin Charles (born 25 March 1948) was a judge of the High Court of England and Wales. He retired on 17 February 2018. A former judge of the Family Division of the High Court of England and Wales and the President of the Administrative Appeals Chamber of the Upper Tribunal, he was latterly a judge of the Queen’s Bench Division and vice-president of the Court of Protection.

== Education ==
Charles attended Malvern College, then Christ's College, Cambridge.

== Legal career ==
In 1971, Charles was called to the bar (Lincoln's Inn). He was junior counsel to the Crown Chancery from 1986 until his appointment as first junior counsel to the Treasury in Chancery matters. He continued in that role until his appointment on 12 January 1998 as a High Court judge. He was appointed to the Family Division and received the customary knighthood.

He was appointed President of the Administrative Appeals Chamber of the Upper Tribunal on 4 April 2012. On 13 January 2014, the Lord Chief Justice, following consultation with the Lord Chancellor, transferred Mr Justice Charles from the Family Division to the Queen's Bench Division of the High Court, appointing him as vice-president of the Court of Protection, for a three-year term.

== Arms ==
Coat of arms of William Charles

Motto
Semper Sperans Semper Laborans

== See also ==
- List of High Court judges of England and Wales
- List of Lords Justices of Appeal
- Justice of the Supreme Court of the United Kingdom
- Senator of the College of Justice (Scotland)
