= Henry Brandon, Baron Brandon of Oakbrook =

British judge (1920–1999)

The Right Honourable The Lord Brandon of Oakbrook MC PC

Lord of Appeal in Ordinary
- In office 24 September 1981 – 30 September 1991

Personal details
- Born: Henry Vivian Brandon; 3 June 1920 Worthing, Sussex
- Died: 24 March 1999 (aged 78)

Henry Vivian Brandon, Baron Brandon of Oakbrook, MC, PC (3 June 1920 – 24 March 1999) was a British judge.

== Early life and career ==
Brandon was born in Worthing, Sussex, the younger son of Captain Vivian Ronald Brandon RN and of Joan Elizabeth Maud Simpson. He was educated at Durston House, Winchester College, and King's College, Cambridge, where he initially read Classics. His studies were interrupted by World War II. He was commissioned into the Royal Artillery and won the Military Cross for directing artillery fire behind Vichy lines in Madagascar.

After the war he returned to Cambridge, graduating with a First in Law in 1946. The same year he was called to the bar by the Inner Temple in 1946. He practised in the Probate, Divorce and Admiralty Division of the High Court, becoming the only man at the bar to build up a practice in all three areas. He was appointed a Queen's Counsel in 1961.

== Judicial career ==
Brandon was appointed to the High Court in 1966, at the age of forty-six, and was assigned to the Probate, Divorce and Admiralty Division, where he was the sole Admiralty judge. He received the customary knighthood the same year. In 1971, the Division was reformed into the Family Division under the Administration of Justice Act 1970, and its Admiralty jurisdiction was transferred to the Queen's Bench Division. Brandon remained with the new Family Division, although he sat as an 'additional judge of the Queen's Bench Division' on secondment from the Family Division.

Brandon was appointed a Lord Justice of Appeal in 1978 and sworn of the Privy Council. On 24 September 1981, he was appointed a Lord of Appeal in Ordinary and was created a life peer with the title Baron Brandon of Oakbrook, of Hammersmith in Greater London. In 1991, he retired from judicial service.

== Family ==
Brandon married Jeanette "Jinny" Janvrin on 28 December 1955. She had been born in Calcutta in 1931. In the UK, she worked as a secretary and was acclaimed as "Britain's perfect secretary" in 1953. They had three sons and a daughter. Lady Brandon died in 2018.
