= Court of Protection =

British court created under the Mental Capacity Act 2005

- Royal Coat of Arms of the United Kingdom
- Interactive map of Court of Protection
- 51.518436°N 0.114516°W
- Established: 1 October 2007; 18 years ago
- Jurisdiction: England and Wales
- Location: High Holborn, London Borough of Camden, London
- Coordinates: 51.518436°N 0.114516°W
- Composition method: Judges nominated by Lord Chief Justice of England and Wales or President of the Court of Protection from members of the Judiciary of England and Wales (except magistrates)
- Authorised by: Mental Capacity Act 2005
- Appeals to: Court of Appeal and Supreme Court
- Website: www.gov.uk/courts-tribunals/court-of-protection

President of the Court of Protection
- Currently: Sir Andrew McFarlane
- Since: 27 July 2018; 7 years ago

Vice-President of the Court of Protection
- Currently: Mr Justice Hayden
- Since: 31 July 2018; 7 years ago

In England and Wales, the Court of Protection is a superior court of record created under the Mental Capacity Act 2005. It has jurisdiction over the property, financial affairs and personal welfare of people who lack mental capacity to make decisions for themselves.

== History ==
The Court of Protection evolved from the Office of the Master in Lunacy, which was renamed the Court of Protection in 1947. Its jurisdiction derived from both the Lunacy Act 1890 and De Prerogativa Regis of 1324, which gave the monarch authority over the property of 'idiots' and 'lunatics'. The Court of Protection was responsible for overseeing the management and administration of the estates of individuals who were unable to manage their own affairs, by reason of unsoundness of mind or infirmity.

It was an office of the Senior Courts of England and Wales, later governed by the Mental Health Act 1983. At that time the old Court of Protection was part of the old Office of the Public Guardian; the new Court of Protection and the Public Guardian are now entirely separate organisations with different responsibilities. The earlier Court of Protection dealt exclusively with financial matters, but the new Court of Protection was granted powers to deal with health and personal welfare issues, and has the same powers as the High Court of Justice.

The Court of Protection's powers are defined by the Mental Capacity Act 2005, and was established by order of the Lord Chancellor through the Mental Capacity Act 2005 (Commencement No. 2) Order 2007. The rules of the Court of Protection were established by order of the President of the Family Division through The Court of Protection Rules 2007.

The offices and full-time Judges of the Court of Protection were originally located at Archway Tower, Junction Road, London. Since 9 January 2012, the Court was located in the Thomas More Building at the Royal Courts of Justice on the Strand, London. The Court is currently located at First Avenue House, 42-49 High Holborn, London WC1A 9JA.

As of April 2017, the President of the Court of Protection was Sir James Munby, who is also President of the Family Division, and the Vice-President was Sir William Charles.

== Jurisdiction and powers ==
The Court of Protection has the power to decide if a person lacks capacity to make decisions for themselves, and then to decide what actions to take in the person's best interests. The Court has the power to adjudicate on deprivations of liberty, which includes depriving a person of liberty who is over 16, lacks capacity, and can be living at home.

The Court of Protection has the power to appoint Deputies, who can make decisions on behalf of the person who is deemed to lack capacity. The power to appoint Deputies is granted by Sections 15 to 21 of the Mental Capacity Act 2005. Cardiff University noted that Deputies are most commonly appointed to deal with matters of property and finances, although the Mental Capacity Act 2005 allows for Deputies to make decisions on health and welfare. However, the Court of Protection either makes these decisions itself, and applications are often rejected under Sections 5 and 6 of the Mental Capacity Act 2005.

Among its various roles the Court of Protection is responsible for determining disputes as to the registration of enduring powers of attorney, and Lasting Powers of Attorney, appointing new trustees, appointing deputies to manage the affairs of persons who do not have the mental capacity to make the relevant decisions, authorising certain gifts and making statutory wills. Examples of personal welfare issues determined by the court are decisions about where protected persons live, who they see and how they are cared for.

== Criticism ==
Journalist Christopher Booker wrote a series of articles in The Daily Telegraph critical of the Court of Protection, calling it the "most sinister" and "most secretive" court in the United Kingdom. Booker reported several cases where elderly Britons were forced to hand over their assets to social workers and the courts. The increasing workload of the Court over the period 2008 to 2012 led to lengthy delays in making decisions involving finances of subjects of the Court. The personal difficulties arising from such delays have led to criticism of the Court.

== Notable cases ==
In 2015, the Court of Protection ruled that a woman with six children and an IQ of 70 should be sterilised because another pregnancy would have been a "significantly life-threatening event" for her and the foetus due to her having a very thin uterus.

== Gibraltar ==
The court system of Gibraltar has a similar institution also called the Court of Protection, part of its Supreme Court.

== See also ==
- Mental Health Review Tribunal (England and Wales)
