= Mental Capacity Act 2005 =

Act of the Parliament of the United Kingdom

Mental Capacity Act 2005 (Note: Section 69.)
- Act of Parliament
- Parliament of the United Kingdom
- Long title: An Act to make new provision relating to persons who lack capacity; to establish a superior court of record called the Court of Protection in place of the office of the Supreme Court called by that name; to make provision in connection with the Convention on the International Protection of Adults signed at the Hague on 13 January 2000; and for connected purposes.
- Citation: 2005 c. 9
- Territorial extent: England and Wales, except that paragraph 16(1) of Schedule 1 and paragraph 15(3) of Schedule 4 extend to the United Kingdom and, subject to any provision made in Schedule 6, the amendments and repeals made by Schedules 6 and 7 have the same extent as the enactments to which they relate. (Note: Section 68(4)–(6).)

Dates
- Royal assent: 7 April 2005
- Commencement: Various (Note: Section 68(1)–(3).)
Other legislation
Amends	List: Fines and Recoveries Act 1833; Improvement of Land Act 1864; Trustee Act 1925; Law of Property Act 1925; Administration of Estates Act 1925; National Assistance Act 1948; U.S.A. Veterans' Pensions (Administration) Act 1949; Intestates' Estates Act 1952; Variation of Trusts Act 1958; Administration of Justice Act 1960; Industrial and Provident Societies Act 1965; Compulsory Purchase Act 1965; Leasehold Reform Act 1967; Medicines Act 1968; Family Law Reform Act 1969; Local Authority Social Services Act 1970; Courts Act 1971; Local Government Act 1972; Matrimonial Causes Act 1973; Juries Act 1974; Consumer Credit Act 1974; Solicitors Act 1974; Local Government (Miscellaneous Provisions) Act 1976; Sale of Goods Act 1979; Limitation Act 1980; Public Passenger Vehicles Act 1981; Judicial Pensions Act 1981; Supreme Court Act 1981; Mental Health Act 1983; Administration of Justice Act 1985; Insolvency Act 1986; Building Societies Act 1986; Public Trustee and Administration of Funds Act 1986; Patronage (Benefices) Measure 1986; Courts and Legal Services Act 1990; Child Support Act 1991; Social Security Administration Act 1992; Judicial Pensions and Retirement Act 1993; Leasehold Reform, Housing and Urban Development Act 1993; Goods Vehicles (Licensing of Operators) Act 1995; Disability Discrimination Act 1995; Trusts of Land and Appointment of Trustees Act 1996; Human Rights Act 1998; Trustee Delegation Act 1999; Access to Justice Act 1999; Care Standards Act 2000; Adoption and Children Act 2002; Licensing Act 2003; Courts Act 2003
Repeals/revokes	Enduring Powers of Attorney Act 1985
Amended by	List: National Health Service (Consequential Provisions) Act 2006; Lord Chancellor (Transfer of Functions and Supplementary Provisions) (No.2) Order 2006; Mental Health Act 2007; Legal Services Act 2007; Human Fertilisation and Embryology Act 2008; Health and Social Care Act 2008 (Consequential Amendments No.2) Order 2010; National Health Service (Direct Payments) Regulations 2010; Parental Responsibility and Measures for the Protection of Children (International Obligations) (England and Wales and Northern Ireland) Regulations 2010; Health and Social Care Act 2012; Legal Aid, Sentencing and Punishment of Offenders Act 2012; Tribunals, Courts and Enforcement Act 2007 (Consequential Amendments) Order 2012; Health and Social Care Act 2008 (Regulated Activities) (Amendment) Regulations 2012; Public Bodies (Abolition of Her Majesty’s Inspectorate of Courts Administration and the Public Guardian Board) Order 2012; Crime and Courts Act 2013; Co-operative and Community Benefit Societies Act 2014; Health and Social Care Act 2008 (Regulated Activities) Regulations 2014; Marriage (Same Sex Couples) Act 2013 (Consequential and Contrary Provisions and Scotland) Order 2014; Criminal Justice and Courts Act 2015; Deregulation Act 2015; Care Act 2014 and Children and Families Act 2014 (Consequential Amendments) Order 2015; Social Services and Well-being (Wales) Act 2014 (Consequential Amendments) Regulations 2016; Guardianship (Missing Persons) Act 2017; Court of Protection Rules 2017; Data Protection Act 2018; Regulation and Inspection of Social Care (Wales) Act 2016 (Consequential Amendments) Regulations 2018; Mental Capacity (Amendment) Act 2019; Civil Partnership (Opposite-sex Couples) Regulations 2019; Jurisdiction and Judgments (Family) (Amendment etc.) (EU Exit) Regulations 2019; Judicial Review and Courts Act 2022 (Magistrates’ Court Sentencing Powers) Regulations 2023

Status: Amended

Text of statute as originally enacted

Revised text of statute as amended

The Mental Capacity Act 2005 (c. 9) is an act of the Parliament of the United Kingdom applying to England and Wales. Its primary purpose is to provide a legal framework for acting and making decisions on behalf of adults who lack the capacity to make particular decisions for themselves.

== Features of the act ==
=== The five statutory principles ===
The five principles are outlined in Section 1 of the act. These are designed to protect people who lack capacity to make particular decisions and to maximise their ability to make decisions and participate in decision-making, as far as they are able to do so.

1. A person must be assumed to have capacity unless it is established that he/she lacks capacity.
2. A person is not to be treated as unable to make a decision unless all practicable steps to help him/her to do so have been taken without success.
3. A person is not to be treated as unable to make a decision merely because he/she makes an unwise decision.
4. An act done, or decision made, under this Act for or on behalf of a person who lacks capacity must be done, or made, in his/ her best interests.
5. Before the act is done, or the decision is made, regard must be had to whether the purpose for which it is needed can be as effectively achieved in a way that is less restrictive of the person's rights and freedom of action.

=== Summary of other key elements of the act ===
- The act makes provision for people to plan ahead for a time when they may need support. This introduces advance decisions to refuse treatment.
- The decision (or question) under consideration must be time and decision specific.
- The Act upholds the principle of Best Interest for the individual concerned.
- A Court of Protection will help with difficult decisions. The Office of the Public Guardian (formerly Public Guardianship Office), the administrative arm of the Court of Protection, will help the Act work.
- An Independent Mental Capacity Advocate (IMCA) service will provide help for people who have no intimate support network.
- S(44) of The Act makes it a criminal offence to wilfully neglect someone without capacity.
- The Act generally applies only to those over the age of 16 years, although may apply to some younger people if it is supposed that their capacity will continue to be impaired into adulthood.

== Section 68: Commencement and extent ==
The following orders have been made under this section:

- The Mental Capacity Act 2005 (Commencement No.1) Order 2006 (S.I. 2006/2814 (C. 95))
- The Mental Capacity Act 2005 (Commencement No.1) (Amendment) Order 2006 (S.I. 2006/3473 (C. 133))
- The Mental Capacity Act 2005 (Commencement No. 2) Order 2007 (S.I. 2007/1897 (C. 72))
- The Mental Capacity Act 2005 (Commencement No. 1) (England and Wales) Order 2007 (S.I. 2007/563 (C. 24))
- Mental Capacity Act 2005 (Commencement) (Wales) Order 2007 (S.I. 2007/856 (W. 79) (C. 34))

== Timetable of new features ==
The new measures that the Act introduced were:

April 2007

- A new criminal offence of wilful neglect of a person without capacity
- A new Independent Mental Capacity Advocacy Service in England
- A Code of Practice that tells people how to ensure they are following the Act

October 2007

- Extension of the Independent Mental Capacity Advocacy Service to Wales
- Lasting Powers of Attorney and deputies
- A new Court of Protection
- A new Office of the Public Guardian

== Amendments ==
In response to the ruling by the European Court of Human Rights in HL v UK (2004) (the 'Bournewood' judgement) the Act was amended by the Mental Health Act 2007 in July that year. These additions are known as the Deprivation of Liberty Safeguards (DoLS), and were implemented in April 2009. These amendments created administrative procedures to ensure the Act's processes are observed in cases of adults who are, or may be, deprived of their liberty in care homes or hospitals, thus protecting health and social care providers from prosecution under human rights legislation.

Key elements of the DoLS are that the person must be provided with a representative and given the right to challenge the deprivation of liberty through the Court of Protection, and that there must be a mechanism for the deprivation of liberty to be reviewed and monitored regularly.

The DoLS were introduced in response to the Bournewood case, on which the European Court of Human Rights ruled in October 2004 (HL v United Kingdom) that a detention of an incapacitated patient which did not comply with Article 5 of the European Convention on Human Rights had taken place; in particular, a person who is detained must be told the reasons for the detention and must also, under Article 5(4), have the right of speedy access to a court to appeal against the detention.

=== Mental Capacity (Amendment) Act 2019 ===
Mental Capacity (Amendment) Act 2019 (Note: Section 6(8).)
- Act of Parliament
- Parliament of the United Kingdom
- Long title: An Act to amend the Mental Capacity Act 2005 in relation to procedures in accordance with which a person may be deprived of liberty where the person lacks capacity to consent; and for connected purposes.
- Citation: 2019 c. 18
- Territorial extent: England and Wales (Note: Section 6(1).)

Dates
- Royal assent: 16 May 2019
- Commencement: Various (Note: Section 6(2)–(7).)
Other legislation
Amends	Mental Capacity Act 2005; Mental Health Act 2007

Status: Current legislation

Text of statute as originally enacted

Revised text of statute as amended

The Mental Capacity (Amendment) Act 2019 (c. 18) was passed in May 2019.

This act will replace DoLS with a new legal framework called Liberty Protection Safeguards (LPS). These will be used for anyone 16 or above who lacks capacity rather than 18 as previously used in DoLS. The "acid test' from the Cheshire West case remains, there is still no statutory definition of deprivation of liberty. The target date for implementation was October 2020, but it was announced by Helen Whately, Minister for Care, in July 2020 that the implementation would be delayed, with full implementation expected by April 2022. Some of this delay was attributed to the COVID-19 pandemic. During this period a draft Code of practice will be produced which will go out to public consultation. On 4 April 2023 a further delay was announced by the government, who stated that any implementation is likely to be beyond the life of that Parliament. On 18 October 2025, the new government (DHSC) announced that it intended to implement LPS and would launch a public consultation in the first half of 2026 on LPS, and subsequently create an updated Mental Capacity Act Code of Practice.

=== UK legislation ===
- Text of the Mental Capacity Act 2005 as in force today (including any amendments) within the United Kingdom, from legislation.gov.uk.
- Explanatory notes to the Mental Capacity Act 2005.

== See also ==
- Adults with Incapacity (Scotland) Act 2000
- Mental Health Act 1983
- Mental Health Act 2007
