= Article 5 of the European Convention on Human Rights =

Article 5 of the European Convention on Human Rights (Art.5 ECHR for short) provides that everyone has the right to liberty and security of person. Liberty and security of the person are taken as a "compound" concept - security of the person has not been subject to separate interpretation by the Court.

Article 5 – Right to liberty and security

1. Everyone has the right to liberty and security of person. No one shall be deprived of his liberty save in the following cases and in accordance with a procedure prescribed by law:
  1. the lawful detention of a person after conviction by a competent court;
  2. the lawful arrest or detention of a person for non-compliance with the lawful order of a court or in order to secure the fulfilment of any obligation prescribed by law;
  3. the lawful arrest or detention of a person effected for the purpose of bringing him before the competent legal authority on reasonable suspicion of having committed an offence or when it is reasonably considered necessary to prevent his committing an offence or fleeing after having done so;
  4. the detention of a minor by lawful order for the purpose of educational supervision or his lawful detention for the purpose of bringing him before the competent legal authority;
  5. the lawful detention of persons for the prevention of the spreading of infectious diseases, of persons of unsound mind, alcoholics or drug addicts or vagrants;
  6. the lawful arrest or detention of a person to prevent his effecting an unauthorised entry into the country or of a person against whom action is being taken with a view to deportation or extradition.
2. Everyone who is arrested shall be informed promptly, in a language which he understands, of the reasons for his arrest and of any charge against him.
3. Everyone arrested or detained in accordance with the provisions of paragraph 1.c of this article shall be brought promptly before a judge or other officer authorised by law to exercise judicial power and shall be entitled to trial within a reasonable time or to release pending trial. Release may be conditioned by guarantees to appear for trial.
4. Everyone who is deprived of his liberty by arrest or detention shall be entitled to take proceedings by which the lawfulness of his detention shall be decided speedily by a court and his release ordered if the detention is not lawful.
5. Everyone who has been the victim of arrest or detention in contravention of the provisions of this article shall have an enforceable right to compensation.

== History ==
Article 5 provides the right to liberty and security, subject only to lawful arrest or detention under certain other circumstances, such as arrest on suspicion of a crime or imprisonment in fulfilment of a sentence. The article also provides the right to be informed in a language one understands of the reasons for the arrest and any charge against them, the right of prompt access to judicial proceedings to determine the legality of one's arrest or detention and to trial within a reasonable time or release pending trial, and the right to compensation in the case of arrest or detention in violation of this article.

Some provisions of English and US law provided similar protections as early as the thirteenth century:

- Magna Carta clause 29 (1215, re-enacted 1297) (as currently in force): prohibits deprivation of liberty or property except in accordance with law
- Habeas Corpus Act 1679: provided a judicial remedy for unlawful imprisonment
- Entick v Carrington [1765] EWHC KB J98: found a search and seizure without specific lawful authority to be unlawful; later generalized to prohibit the government from doing anything without lawful authority
- Fourth Amendment to the United States Constitution (1791): prohibits seizure of property or persons without specific lawful authority and probable cause
- Fifth Amendment to the United States Constitution (1791): prohibits deprivation of life, liberty of property without due process of law

== Case law ==
- HL v United Kingdom, App no 45508/99; 40 EHRR 761 (5 October 2004)
- Assanidze v. Georgia, App no 71503/01 (8 April 2004)
- P (by his litigation friend the Official Solicitor) v Cheshire West and Chester Council 2014 (UKSC) 19

== See also ==
- European Convention on Human Rights
