= Office of the Public Guardian (England and Wales) =

Government body

Executive Agency overview
- Formed: 2007
- Preceding Executive Agency: Public Guardianship Office
- Jurisdiction: England and Wales
- Headquarters: Birmingham
- Minister responsible: Sarah Sackman MP, Minister of State for Courts and Legal Services
- Executive Agency executive: Ruth Duffin, Chief Executive and Public Guardian
- Website: gov.uk/opg

The Office of the Public Guardian (OPG) in England and Wales is a government body that, within the framework of the Mental Capacity Act 2005, polices the activities of deputies, attorneys and guardians who act to protect the financial affairs of people who lack the mental capacity for making decisions about such things. It is an executive agency of the Ministry of Justice. The current Public Guardian and Chief Executive of the Office of the Public Guardian is Ruth Duffin, replacing Amy Holmes, who acted as Public Guardian from July 2022 to April 2025.

The OPG was established on 1 October 2007, replacing the Public Guardianship Office (PGO). Initially located in London, most functions transferred to offices in Birmingham and Nottingham during 2009.

== List of Public Guardians ==
Oct 2007 – Jul 2008	Richard Brook
Jul 2008 – April 2012	Martin John
April 2012– 28 June 2019	Alan Eccles
1 July 2019 – March 2022	Nick Goodwin
April 2022 – July 2022	Stuart Howard
July 2022 – April 2025	Amy Holmes
April 2025 – Present	Ruth Duffin

== See also ==
- Office of the Public Guardian (Scotland)
