= Characterisation (law) =

Characterisation, or characterization, in conflict of laws, is the second stage of the procedure to resolve a lawsuit that involves foreign law. The process is described in English law as Characterisation, or classification within the English judgments of the European Court of Justice. It is alternatively known as qualification in French law.

It is used to determine the correct choice of law rules based on the circumstances of the case, primarily relating to matters of property. This is to reconcile differences between laws of different legal jurisdictions. The objective of characterisation is to determine the nature of the action brought by the defendant in order to determine what relevant rules of applicable law apply. This may result in applying laws which differ from the lex fori. Additional factors make this determination not necessarily a simple process as the incidental question and renvoi can make determining the initial point of reference difficult. The leading authorities in England and Wales are Macmillan Inc v Bishopsgate Investment Trust plc (No 3) [1996] WLR 387 and Raiffeisen Zentralbank Österreich AG v Five Star General Trading LLC [2001] EWCA Civ 68, [2001] QB 825.

== Overview ==
Characterisation is one of the key elements in demarcating the choice of law and jurisdiction issues. The first stage is for the court to determine if it has jurisdiction, if appropriate, to avoid forum shopping. Once the forum court decides that it has jurisdiction to hear the case, it must characterise or classify the cause(s) of action, this relates to choice of law matters. That is regarded as the most important and difficult problem in conflict of laws as trade and travel between states have become the norm. The effects of broken promises, defective goods, traffic accidents and marital squabbles are no longer confined to the sovereign territory of one particular state or nation. This is especially complicated because domestic laws usually operate to satisfy domestic interest. Various causes of actions and their respective remedies differ depending on the state. This derive from historical and political circumstances. The addition of the Rome I and Rome II Regulations to the European Union conflict of laws regime is designed to determine the choice of law which applies to situations where commercial or civil matters of broken promises, defective goods, traffic accidents, etc. with a party which is domiciled in a Member State.

The role of characterisation within an international private law adjudication might be highlighted if understood within the simplest example of the sale of a bicycle by A to B. The transaction has both contractual and proprietary elements. Different jurisdictions will characterise the matter in different ways depending on their own laws. As is crucial within the international private law context, it is the responsibility of the adjudicating court to determine the proper law and subsequently apply it.

For example, in English law, two separate methods for characterising the cause of action exist. The first, are commercial and civil matters relating to contractual and non-contractual obligations. The Rome Regulations determine choice of law rules in said matters by providing an allocative framework for characterisation. By contrast, the second method is that of the common law rules, applying to matters of property, marriage, and matters which fall outside the Rome Regulations. In Macmillan Inc. v Bishopsgate Investment Trust plc [1996] 1 ALL E R 585, Auld LJ. accepted that "the proper approach is to look beyond the formulation of the claim and to identify according to the lex fori the true issue or issues thrown up by the claim and the defence". In both cases, characterisation depends on determining the applicable law to the set of facts in order to determine the choice of law. This is often done in reference to the lex causae, the "law of the causes". However, the lex causae would, under certain circumstances, be problematic for determining the facts of the case.

== Characterisation of issues vs. characterisation of laws ==
Characterisation in the conflict of laws can be applied both to issues in dispute in a particular case, and in relation to particular foreign laws.

=== Issues ===
Typically in a dispute which has a cross border element, where an issue arises between the parties the court will characterise the nature of that dispute, and the characterisation or classification of the issue will thereby point to the correct choice of law rule to apply. Although the characterisation process is a fundamental part of the conflict of laws, cases where characterisation is disputed are relatively rare. In most cases the proper characterisation is applied almost "without thought".

In English law two of the most celebrated cases where classification was disputed were the leadings cases of Macmillan Inc v Bishopsgate Investment Trust plc (No 3) [1996] WLR 387 and Raiffeisen Zentralbank Österreich AG v Five Star General Trading LLC [2001] EWCA Civ 68.

In Macmillan the issue was which party had the greater priority claim to certain shares - the mortgagee of the shares, or the innocent third party who had been defrauded by the mortgagor. The mortgagees argued that the issue was properly characterised as an issue of property law (in which case the law of the situs would apply), whereas the defrauded victims argued it was an issue of the law of restitution (in which case the law of the place of enrichment was argued to apply). The Court of Appeal held that the issue of who had priority to title to the shares was an issue of property law.

In RZB v Five Star General Trading LLC [2001] EWCA Civ 68 the issue was who had a better claim to the proceeds of a marine insurance policy - the banks to whom the insurance policy had been mortgaged, or a third party who had obtained an attachment over the policy following a collision at sea. The third party argued that the issue was a matter of property law (in which case the law of the situs - which in this case was France - should apply, and they would prevail). The banks argued it was a matter of the law of contract (in which case the governing law of the contract - English law - would apply). The Court of Appeal held that the issue should properly be characterised as a matter of contract.

=== Foreign laws ===
The English courts will often seek to characterise a rule of foreign law to determine whether or not it applies to the dispute before them. For example, in Huber v Steiner (1835) 2 Bing (NC) 202 the court had to consider the nature of a rule of French law which prohibited the bringing of an action on a promissory note (which was governed by French law) after five years. The court held that the rule of French law was procedural rather than substantive, and that as such it did not apply in the proceedings before the English court as procedural matters were to be determined by English law. Similarly, in Re Maldonado [1954] P 223 a Spanish domiciliary had died intestate with no living heirs. Under Spanish law the state would inherit as 'ultimate beneficiary'. The English court had to decide whether the Spanish law was properly characterised as a rule of succession (in which case it would apply, as the law of the deceased's domicile) or a rule of property law (in which case it would not apply, as the relevant property was located in England and title was determined by the lex situs). The court characterised the Spanish law as a rule of succession and applied it.

== Decision on law to be applied ==
Although it may appear logical to allow the whole of the lex causae, including its characterisation rules, to apply, it actually produces a circular argument: the lex causae is to apply to the process of characterisation before the process of characterisation has led to the choice of the relevant lex causae. Certain exceptions to the application of the Lex Causae are outlined below.

Thus, the conflict rules of the lex fori, the domestic law of the forum, (i.e. the court dealing with the case,) are usually applied even if, in extreme cases, the application of only the substantive provisions of the foreign law by the forum court could produce a judgment that neither the lex causae nor the lex fori would normally have produced. Nevertheless, there are several cases when characterisation is not made by the lex fori:

- choice of law clause (lex voluntatis), such as those regulated by Article 4 of the Rome II Regulation
- subsequent characterisation (which is a problem of the lex causae)
- real estate or immovables (when lex situs applies)
- renvoi
- unknown legal institutions
- law of nationality (when lex patriae applies)
- international treaties

== Process ==
The court is required to analyse the pleadings prepared by the parties and to assign each component element to the most appropriate juridical concept or category. The rules of any given system of law are arranged under different categories, addressing procedure, status, contract, tort, divorce, nullity etc. For each category, there is one or more choice of law rules. Thus, for example, all questions as to the status of a person before a court (a minor or adult, legitimate, legitimated or illegitimate, married or not, mentally incapacitated or not, bankrupt or not etc.) will all be governed by the person's personal law, the law of nationality (the lex patriae) or habitual residence in a civil law state, or the law of domicile (the lex domicilii) in a common law state.

In English law, the complete application of Characterisation is limited in commercial and civil matters by the Rome I and Rome II Regulations which provides a framework for categorisation of said matters within the European Union regime. English common law characterisation has resultantly become limited to all matters which do not fall within Rome Regulations (matters which are not civil and commercial matters). This includes matters of property and marriage. Staughton LJ Macmillan Inc v Bishopsgate Investment Trust sets out three stages

In any case which involves a foreign element it may prove necessary to decide what system of law is to be applied, either to the case as a whole or to a particular issue or issues. Mr. Oliver, for Macmillan Inc., has referred to that as the proper law; but I would reserve that expression for other purposes, such as the proper law of a contract, or of an obligation. Conflict lawyers speak of the lex causae when referring to the system of law to be applied. For those who spurn Latin in favour of English, one could call it the law applicable to the suit (or issue) or, simply, the applicable law. It is presumably here that the Rome regulations intercede. Applying overtop the three stage processes.

In finding the lex causae there are three stages [...] First, it is necessary to characterise the issue that is before the court. Is it for example about the formal validity of a marriage? Or intestate succession to moveable property? Or interpretation of a contract? [...]

The second stage is to select the rule of conflict of laws which lays down a connecting factor for the issue in question. Thus the formal validity of a marriage is to be determined, for the most part, by the law of the place where it is celebrated; intestate succession to moveables, by the law of the place where the deceased was domiciled when he died; and the interpretation of a contract, by what is described as its proper law. [...]

Thirdly, it is necessary to identify the system of law which is tied by the connecting factor found in stage two to the issue characterised in stage one. Sometimes this will present little difficulty, though I suppose that even a marriage may now be celebrated on a video link. The choice of the proper law of a contract, on the other hand, may be controversial.

In an ideal world the answers obtained in these three stages would be the same, in whatever country they were determined. But unfortunately the conflict rules are by no means the same in all systems of law. In those circumstances a choice of conflict rule may have to be made[...]

This means that in England, the specific legal problem will be governed by the law of the connecting factors. The leading text of Dicey & Morris formulates the question, using the example of the constitution of a corporation in the following manner:

[All matters concerning the constitution of a corporation(CATEGORY) are governed by the law of the [place of incorporation(CONNECTING FACTOR)]

Thus, the category, which is determined by understanding the substantive question at hand, is used to identify a relevant connecting factor. The first stage must be used to determine the "character" of the claim (hence characterisation). This is not necessarily the name of the action but the type. i.e. Not necessarily conversion but it is a matter relating to ownership of personal property. Lord Mance in Raiffeisen Zentral Bank expressed caution with relation to allowing the rules to control decision and emphasised the importance of determining the core matter which is sought to be determined. In the case of MacMillan, it was whether the parties were bona fide purchasers for value without notice. This The second and third stages of this test are determined by the lex fori. The Characterising laws as either procedural or substantive is necessary, but that part of the process can be abused by the forum court to maximise the use of the local law.

The generality of the characterisation process is not and cannot be wholly scientific. It is always a matter of interpretation. For example, if A, who is a national of Arcadia, dies having made a valid local will and leaves land situated in Barsoom to C, who is domiciled in Catilage, how is the issue to be classified? One might say that any rights that C might have are vested by the will that was made in Arcadia, the lex loci actus. Equally, the right to succeed to title might be an aspect of C's status as the oldest surviving male heir under Cartilagean law, the lex loci domicilii. Also, it may be a matter for the law of Barsoom since all matters of title to land must be adjusted by the lex situs, as the law of the place of the land. Thus, completely different judgments might result depending on how the forum court characterises the action.

One of the most enduring solutions to this problem was proposed by Friedrich Carl von Savigny (1779–1861). He argued that it was always necessary for the court to find the "natural seat" or "centre of gravity" for the case by identifying the largest cluster of "connecting factors" to a particular legal system. If all courts adopted such an international outlook, he reasoned, that would eliminate forum shopping by producing the same choice of law no matter where the case began. Unfortunately, the theory has not delivered the desired results. Forum shopping remains a problem, and neither legislators nor judges have been able to agree on characterisation issues, producing classifications that extend rather than reduce international divergences.

In an attempt to avoid obviously unjust results in particular cases, some judges have created a number of public policy exceptions to justify decisions "on the merits". Ernest G Lorenzen commented that the strategy was a warning that there must be serious problems with the rules if policy exceptions were the solution.

== Under European Union Regulations ==
Choice of law characterisation within the European regime relating to civil and commercial matters is determined by the Rome I Regulation and Rome II regulation. The Rome I regulation, succeeding the Rome Convention regulates choice of law rules regarding contractual obligations, meaning voluntary obligations between two parties, which uses the definition that is used for Article 7.1 of the Brussels Regulation: "An obligation freely entered into with regard to another, identified, person". By contrast, the Rome II regulation covers non-contractual obligations, including Torts, delicts, and semi-delicts. The determination of whether a matter is contractual or non-contractual may, at first glance, appear straightforward but becomes complicated when one considers how to categorise pre-contractual obligations and liability and disputes, or fiduciary duties existing between contracting parties (which are neither non-contractual nor contractual obligations that may arise as a result of a contract). The question of characterisation becomes crucial to determining which regulation applies. The leading authority of C-359/14 Ergo Insurance SE (2016) outlined the distinction between when a contract, in this circumstance an insurance agreement, would be categorised as either contractual or non-contractual. The decision affirmed that the first stage of applying choice of law rules, particularly those in the European regime, must be determining the categorisation, or "classification" of the disputes. In the European context, 'contractual obligation' and 'non-contractual obligation' must be interpreted independently from national law. The concept of 'non-contractual obligation' was determined broadly and by reference, at least in part, to the obligations which did not fall within 'contractual obligations' (as defined by C-375/13 Kolassa paragraph 39).

== Exclusion of foreign law ==
Because the early system of connecting factors was mechanical and inflexible, the results could offend a court's sense of justice. For example, with the development of the motor car, the classification of the cause as tort required the application of the lex loci delicti commissi rule. In France, the Court of Cassation's insistence on the rule frequently barred or severely limited relief for French parties injured in states with no developed law for the compensation of such victims. The lower courts used a variety of judicial devices to avoid the injustice.

English Method In England, the common law of private international law applies the lex fori or encores any provision of the lex causae if the area of penal, even, and other public laws. This is a matter of justiciability, and not merely jurisdiction. That is to say, not only does the English court hold that it has no jurisdiction in the matter, it is unable to hear matters relating to penal, revenue, or other public laws as the recognition of foreign states is one of statecraft and is a power retained by the sovereign, not with the courts. The reasoning of the court in Australia through the spycatcher case was that complying with friendly foreign government decisions placed the courts in difficult positions in the future to determine matters which derived from the sovereign. This was confirmed in the UK through The Barakat Galleries v Government of the Islamic Republic of Iran. The identification of foreign penal laws or foreign revenge law is relatively straight forward, a foreign penal law is a law which imposes a fine and is paid to the state. English law considers this lex fori. Payment to a private individual is unlikely to be considered penal, even if the payment is seen as a penalty or deterrent. By contrast, a revenue law is one which a party cannot opt out of, enforcement cannot be by action in the English courts. The English courts determine a foreign revenue law on the ground that a party may receive a hand back as evidence that the obligation to pay the state is not a foreign revenue law. The third category of 'other public laws' is traditionally one which relate to a claim in action in which only a state can claim, such as tort damages and costs of quashing a rebellion/revolution. Any claim which is founded on a right which is uniquely governmental will not be adjudicated.

English rules will also limit choice of law where matters offend English public policy. It overrides foreign lex causae. An example may be of where a foreign government passes laws to strip certain parties of property wherein the property is not within the foreign government's jurisdiction. For example, Ruritania passes a law that all Ruritanian gold coins owned by a certain group are now owned by the state. If a Ruritanian citizen is living in London with possession of the coins in London, the English court will not recognise an action for adjudication by the Ruritanian government to recover the coins. This relates both to foreign law and to public policy because the foreign law is so repellent to English standards that even to know that it was made was unbearable. In the non-commercial context, this will often apply to matters of divorce and marriage as well. A foreign law which allows marriage of uncle and niece will not be contrary to English Public Policy, however, if the marriage has nothing to do with England. Therefore, two thresholds of English Public Policy exist in limiting lex causae, one which applies regardless and a second, higher threshold which only applies if issues have a real and substantial connection with England.

U.S. Method Comparatively, in the US, the New York Court of Appeals set a national trend in Babcock v. Jackson, 240 N.E.2d 279 (N.Y. 1963), which abandoned the lex loci delicti rule completely. Most jurisdictions have not been so radical and preferred to retain the framework of categories and choice of law rules but left public policy in place, as an avoidance device. That exception provides that states will not apply any foreign law that offends the deeply held principles of the forum state's legal system. For example, it would be considered improper to give enforcement to a law that defined the status of a person as a slave or as in the possession of another, such as for the purposes of sexual exploitation. In cases involving alleged immorality or injustice, that rule has been criticised as susceptible to abuse, as a court could characterise almost any statute or rule as being offensive to the public policy of their state. Less controversial are bars to any cases that would give extraterritorial effect to laws which are confiscatory, seeking to collect taxes owing in another state, or penal: laws that are designed to punish the party committing the wrong, rather than those to compensate the party that suffered loss or injury. That can sometimes lead to a fine balancing act between claims for compensatory and exemplary damages. In the US, the concept of governmental interest analysis was developed by Brainerd Currie and is preferred by many American conflicts writers. Currie focused on each state's substantive rules, rather than on a metaphorical test, for the seat of the legal relationships and assumed that governments are less interested in what happens within their territorial boundaries than in the well-being of their subjects. The methodology that he proposed relies almost entirely on the personal nexus between the litigants and the states. However, there is no single test for this nexus at an international level. Some states use the concept of domicile, others nationality, and the remainder citizenship; also, definitions of domicile vary from state to state. That methodology has thus never been accepted outside the US. Also, if the litigants are from different states, relying on one personal law rather than another may be arbitrary. To cope with that difficulty, Currie advocated that the lex fori should be applied whenever his method produced what he called a "true conflict".Critics have alleged that Currie's approach is nothing more than a complex pretext to avoid applying foreign law if there are two or more personal laws.

== Modern approach ==
Since characterisation and the choice of law rules were operating inflexibly, the solution has been to allow the growth of judicial discretion within both parts of the system. Hence, most legal systems have opted for what English law calls the proper law approach: the identification and application of the law that has the closest connection with the cause(s) of action. It is accepted that the words have the same apparent spirit as the older approach, which requires some caution in their evaluation.

In theory, flexibility will preserve an international outlook and multilateral approach by the courts and in most places, the results are encouraging.

In the US, however, the test now adopted is termed the most significant contacts test or, in a slightly modified form defined in the Second Conflicts Restatement, the most significant relationship test. However, because different courts have interpreted these impressionistic phrases in different ways, there has been little judicial consistency.
