= Convention on the Law Applicable to Contractual Obligations 1980 =

Choice of law in contract disputes

Rome convention
Convention on the Law Applicable to Contractual Obligations
- States applying Rome instruments Rome I Regulation, Rome Convention Rome Convention
- Signed: 19 June 1980
- Location: Rome
- Effective: 1 April 1991
- Condition: 7 ratifications
- Parties: all Member States of the European Union
- Depositary: Director-General of the Council of the European Communities
- Languages: Danish, Dutch, German, English, French, Irish and Italian (original)

The Convention on the Law Applicable to Contractual Obligations 1980, also known as the Rome Convention, is a measure in private international law or conflict of laws which creates a common choice of law system in contracts within the European Union. The convention determines which law should be used, but does not harmonise the substance (the actual law). It was signed in Rome, Italy on 19 June 1980 and entered into force in 1991.

It has now been replaced by the Rome I Regulation (593/2008) except for in Denmark, which has an opt-out from implementing regulations under the area of freedom, security and justice, and the Overseas countries and territories of European Union member states. In that respect, the convention is applicable in Aruba, the Caribbean Netherlands, Curaçao, Sint Maarten (Kingdom of the Netherlands), Faroer (Denmark), Saint-Pierre and Miquelon, Saint Barthélemy, French Polynesia, Wallis and Futuna and New Caledonia (France). The agreement and regulation were applied by the United Kingdom during its membership of the European Union, and following Brexit it still applies the regulation as part of its domestic law.

== Scope of the convention ==
Under Article 1, the Convention's rules are to apply to all choice of law issues involving contractual obligations and, under Article 10, once selected, the lex causae will govern:

(a) interpretation;
(b) performance but, in relation to the manner of performance and the steps to be taken in the event of defective performance, regard shall be had to the lex loci solutionis, i.e. law of the place in which performance takes place;
(c) within the limits of the powers conferred on the forum court by its procedural law, the consequences of breach, including the assessment of damages in so far as it is governed by rules of law;
(d) the various ways of extinguishing obligations, and the limitation of actions; and
(e) the consequences of nullity of the contract.

Article 15 excludes the operation of renvoi. In addition, a number of issues with a separate characterisation are excluded, namely:

- the status or capacity of natural persons. Article 11 covers the situation where two persons physically present in the same state make a contract, and both parties have capacity under the lex loci contractus. One party cannot invoke incapacity under another law unless the other party was aware of this incapacity at the time the contract was made or was not aware of the incapacity as a result of negligence.
- contractual obligations relating to succession and all rights claimed in property in a marriage or family relationship, particularly where the question of the entitlement of any child who is illegitimate is raised.
- obligations arising under negotiable instruments including bills of exchange, cheques, and promissory notes and connected to their negotiable character;
- arbitration agreements and agreements on the choice of court (see arbitration clauses and forum selection clauses);
- questions governed by the law of companies and other bodies corporate or unincorporate such as the creation, by registration or otherwise, legal capacity, internal organisation or winding up of companies and other bodies corporate or unincorporate, and the personal liability of officers and members for the obligations of the company or body;
- the question whether an agent is able to bind a principal, or an organ to bind a company or body corporate or unincorporate, to a third party;
- the constitution of trusts and the relationship between settlors, trustees and beneficiaries (see trusts (conflict));
- evidence and procedure save that, under Article 14, the Applicable Law applies to the extent that it contains, in the law of contract, rules which raise presumptions of law or determine the burden of proof. Thus, under Article 14 (2) a contract or an act intended to have legal effect may be proved by any mode of proof recognised by the lex fori or by any of the laws referred to in Article 9 under which that contract or act is formally valid, provided that such mode of proof can be administered by the forum court.
- the question of whether a contracts of insurance covers a risk situated in the territories of one of the Member States is determined under the municipal law of the relevant states. This exclusion does not apply to contracts of reinsurance.

== The uniform rules ==
=== Express selection ===
Article 3 states the general rule that the parties to a contract have freedom of choice over the applicable law. To exercise this choice either express words may be used or the intention should be demonstrated with reasonable certainty by the terms of the contract or the circumstances of the case.

The law chosen may apply to the whole or only a part of the contract, and the choice is not irrevocable. The parties can at any time agree to change the applicable law and any such variation will not prejudice the formal validity of the agreement nor adversely affect the rights of third parties.

Where all the elements of a contract, at the time of its conclusion, are connected with only one country, Article 3 may not be used to evade the mandatory provisions of that state (Article 3(4)).

To establish a choice demonstrated with reasonable certainty, there must have been a "real choice". That the parties would have chosen a particular law is not sufficient. The court will take into account both the terms of the contract and the circumstances of the case.

The Guiliano-Lagarde Report gives three examples of situations where a real choice may be demonstrated with reasonable certainty:

- Standard form contracts The report gives as an example a Lloyd's policy of marine insurance.
- Jurisdiction and arbitration agreements
- Course of dealing

=== Implied selection ===
If there is no express choice, Article 4 provides that the contract shall be governed by the law of the country with which it is most closely connected. If the agreement is severable, two applicable laws may be selected. For these purposes, it is presumed that the contract is most closely connected with the lex loci solutionis, i.e. the law of the place where the contract is to be performed, or the law of the habitual residence of the person who is to perform, or, in the case of a body corporate or unincorporate, where its central administration is located. However, if it is a commercial or professional contract, the applicable law will be the law of the place in which the principal place of business is situated or, where under the terms of the contract the performance is to be effected through a place of business other than the principal place of business, the country in which that other place of business is situated except that there is a rebuttable presumption:

- where the subject matter of the agreement is immovable property, the lex situs will apply; and
- contracts for the carriage of goods and charter-parties are governed by the law of the place in which, at the time the contract is concluded, the carrier has his principal place of business if that is also the place at which loading or discharge is to occur or the place where the consignor has his or her principal place of business.

The European Court of Justice pointed out in the case of Intercontainer Interfrigo v Balkenende Oosthuizen (2009) that the reference to "contracts for the carriage of goods" does not cover contracts making available a means of transport for the carriage of goods.

=== Consumer contracts ===
Article 5 applies to contracts for the supply of goods or services to a consumer for a non-commercial purpose, or to a contract for the provision of credit for that object. Although Article 3 gives the parties a free choice of law, this choice cannot deprive the consumer of any protections available under the mandatory law of the country in which he has his habitual residence if the consumer was responding to advertising material or a specific invitation and makes the agreement in that country, or if the other party or his agent received the consumer's order in that country, or if the contract is for the sale of goods and the consumer travelled from that country to another country and there gave his order, provided that the consumer's journey was arranged by the seller for the purpose of inducing the consumer to buy. For these purposes, Article 7 defines "mandatory rules" as rules that must be applied whatever the Applicable Law. In deciding whether rules are mandatory in the lex fori or a law with which the contract has a close connection, regard shall be had to their nature and purpose and to the consequences of their application or non-application.

If the contract is silent on the choice of law, it will be governed by the law of habitual residence if it is entered into in the circumstances described above. But this Article does not apply to:

(a) a contract of carriage;
(b) a contract for the supply of services where the services are to be supplied to the consumer exclusively in a country other than that in which he has his habitual residence.

The Article does, however, apply to a contract which, for an inclusive price, provides for a combination of travel and accommodation.

=== Contracts of employment ===
Under Article 6, no choice of law selection contained in a contract of employment can deprive the employee of the protection afforded to him by the mandatory laws which would be applicable in the absence of that choice. If there is no express selection, an employment contract is governed,

(a) by the law of the country in which the employee habitually carries out his work in performance of the contract, even if he is temporarily employed in another country; or

(b) if the employee does not habitually carry out his work in any one country, by the law of the country in which the place of business through which he was engaged is situated;

unless it appears from the circumstances as a whole that the contract is more closely connected with another country, in which case the contract shall be governed by the law of that country.

The provisions may only apply for the benefit of the employee.

=== Material validity ===
Under Article 8, the material validity of a contract, or of any term in a contract, shall be determined by the law which would govern it under the Convention if the contract or term were valid (i.e. the putative Applicable Law). But, if this would produce an obviously unfair result, a party may rely upon the law of the place of habitual residence to establish that he did not give a free consent.

=== Formal validity ===
Under Article 9, a contract concluded between persons who are in the same country is formally valid if it satisfies the formal requirements of either the Applicable Law or the law of the country where it is concluded. A contract concluded between persons who are in different countries is formally valid if it satisfies the formal requirements of either the Applicable Law or the law of one of those countries. Where a contract is concluded by an agent, the country in which the agent acts is the relevant country for the purposes of the earlier tests. But a contract relating to immovable property is always subject to the mandatory provisions of the lex situs.

=== Transfers of obligation ===
Article 12 deals with a voluntary assignment or novation. Whether the rights and/or obligations can be transferred, the nature of the relationship between the assignee and the debtor that results from a transfer, the conditions under which the assignment can be invoked against the debtor, and any question whether the debtor's obligations have been discharged, are determined by the Applicable Law of the original agreement. The Applicable Law of the transfer will determine the mutual obligations of assignor and assignee as against the third party, i.e. "the debtor". Article 13 deals with subrogation so that whether a third person may enforce an existing liability owed to a "creditor" by a "debtor" is determined by reference to the law which governs the debtor's duty to satisfy the creditor.

=== Ordre public ===
Under Article 16, the forum court may invoke its own public policy as a justification for refusing to apply the lex causae.

=== Composite or federated states ===
Under Article 19, where the choice of law rules point to a country with more than one legal system, the Convention selects the most appropriate municipal law (not the choice of law rules of that law given that renvoi is excluded).

== Signature, ratification and amendment ==
The convention was signed by Belgium, Germany, France, Ireland and Italy, Luxembourg and the Netherlands on 19 June 1980, followed by Denmark and the United Kingdom in 1981, thus covering all members of the European Communities. It entered into force in 1991 for 8 of those countries and one year later for Ireland. During the enlargement of the Communities with Greece (1984), Spain and Portugal (1992) and Sweden, Finland and Austria (1996), and the 10 countries in 2004, treaties were concluded on the extension of the convention to those countries. Those Extension conventions were however not all ratified by the United Kingdom, Denmark and Ireland and thus which hampered entry into force of the convention between those three countries and the acceding countries. With the accession of Romania and Bulgaria, the council of the European Union was empowered to effect the accession to the treaty, which took place in 2008.

== See also ==
- Brussels Regime, regarding jurisdiction.
- Rome II Regulation. The analogous EU regulation for torts and delicts arising from non-contractual obligations.
