= Conflict of divorce laws =

Role of marriage and its termination through divorce

In modern society, the role of marriage and its termination through divorce have become political issues. As people live increasingly mobile lives, the conflict of laws and its choice of law rules are highly relevant to determine:

- the circumstances in which people may obtain divorces in states in which they have no permanent or habitual residence; and
- when one state will recognize and enforce a divorce granted in another state

== The problems ==
Sometimes, people get married who have nationalities or domiciles. This can produce serious problems for the parties and for the court systems which are expected to accept jurisdiction over persons sometimes only transiently within their territorial boundaries, and to enforce the judgments and orders of foreign courts. These more technical problems can be made worse by any personal animosity between the parties which contributed to the marital breakdown. In some more extreme cases, spouses move themselves and/or their assets to other jurisdictions to evade their obligations or liabilities, or they move to establish personal jurisdiction so that they can engage in forum shopping. Hence, suppose a German man marries a Turkish woman and they live in Poland until the breakdown, at which point the wife goes to Nevada because she has heard that the courts of the U.S. allow quick divorces and give generous maintenance and property settlement awards. When he hears of this plan, the husband moves himself and all his assets to Ireland because he has heard that Irish courts do not recognise and enforce U.S. divorce decrees and their ancillary orders.

== The concepts ==
The majority of states recognize the family as the natural grouping upon which society and culture are based, and guarantee to protect the institution in their constitutions both as the source of social order and as indispensable to the future welfare of their nations. Hence, marriage tends to be treated as a moral institution (with or without religious significance) and those who achieve the status of spouse are vested with a number of rights which can only be varied or terminated by court order. A few states, usually because of their prevailing religion, either prohibit or discourage termination by divorce. But the majority of more secular states make no fault divorce a relatively automatic process to reflect the reality that the marriage has broken down, sometimes without the need for both parties to attend at a hearing. This has caused a major shift in social policy in many countries because, if divorce is no longer of major juridical significance in the majority of states around the world, the rules for the international recognition and enforcement of foreign divorces also no longer require cautiously framed rules.

== Relevant policies ==
Three public policies are relevant in the general conflict system:

1. Avoiding so-called “limping marriages”. Wherever possible, there should be international uniformity in defining a person's marital status so that people will not be treated as married under the law of one state, but not married under the law of another. However, there may be situations in which it would be quite unjust and inappropriate for the courts of one state to be bound by another state's laws as to status (see below).
2. Favor matrimonii upholds the validity of all marriages entered into with a genuine commitment. But, as states become increasingly secular and allow the termination of marriage through no fault divorce and other less confrontational mechanisms, the policy for recognition and enforcement of foreign decrees may be changing from favor matrimonii to favor divortii (i.e. upholding the validity of the divorce wherever possible).
3. Wherever possible, the results of any litigation should give effect to the legitimate expectations of the parties as to the validity or termination of their marriage. Most U.S. States have codified this concept with putative spouse laws. In other words, a minor flaw in the marriage ceremony should not invalidate a marriage.
4. That the application of all rules should, wherever possible, produce predictable and appropriate outcomes. There is a clear benefit that laws should be certain and easy to administer. Courts have the benefit of expert evidence and time in which to conduct their legal analysis. But the same issues arise far more often in everyday situations where immigration officers, social welfare and tax authorities, and businesses will have to decide whether persons claiming an eligibility or a liability based on their status as a spouse are validly married. If conflict rules are obscure and complicated, this can result in real difficulties for all involved.

But the conflict rules must be consistent with the forum's domestic policies in relation to marriage. Hence, the further policy considerations are:

1. Even though policies related to community life reflect the views, opinions, and the prejudices of that community, local laws have a strong claim to specify the formal requirements for marriages celebrated within their jurisdiction (this is, after all, the reason that the lex loci celebrationis is usually accepted as the law to determine all formal requirements for the marriage). For example, the public interest requires that marriage ceremonies are performed openly and with due publicity, with all valid marriages properly recorded.
2. The public policy underpinning the lex fori (the law of the forum court) will allow the court to ignore foreign limitations on the right to marry which are considered offensive, e.g. those based on differences of race or ethnic origin, or which allow persons of the same biological sex the capacity to marry. However, some states go further, e.g. in the United States, section 283 Second Restatement of Conflict of Laws provides:
3. A marriage which satisfies the requirements of the state where the marriage was contracted will everywhere be recognized as valid unless it violates the strong public policy of another state which had the most significant relationship to the spouses and the marriage at the time of the marriage.” i.e. it introduces a form of proper law test of policy which could potentially lead to the application of a third state's policies which is a confusing possibility. This principle emulates from the "full faith and credit" clause of Article IV of the Constitution.

== Legal termination of marriage ==
A distinction must be made between forms of divorce that are based in a court system administered under a system of law, and divorces that take place in quasi- or extrajudicial setting, i.e. without any formal supervision from the local court system. In both cases, once jurisdiction has been established, the lex fori will be applied to determine whether the local ground(s) of divorce have been satisfied and, if so, the marriage will be terminated with or without ancillary orders being made.

=== Judicial proceedings ===
Since this is an issue affecting the status of the parties, the standard choice of law rules would be either:

- the lex patriae (the law of nationality) or habitual residence applied in the civil law courts (see Article 1 Hague Convention on Recognition of Divorces and Legal Separations 1970); or
- the lex domicilii (the law of the domicile) applied in the common law courts.

Although the law of the nationality may be reasonably easy to identify since it is often merely a matter of registration in the given country, a person may have, say, a Greek nationality but have had a permanent residence in New York State for twenty years without becoming a naturalised American. Insisting on a test under Greek law may not produce a fair or relevant result.

In the common law, marriage can produce a common domicile for the spouses with the wife taking the domicile of the husband. This rule is derived from the proposition that a dependent wife will follow her husband in all aspects of her life. Although this provides a convenient law which is usually easy to identify (since the requirements for change of domicile depend on demonstrating an intention to reside indefinitely in the state of choice, the domicile of the husband is difficult to change) it may produce a result in which a person is domiciled in one state but the matrimonial home and all other features of the parties' lives may be in a second state. This problem is aggravated by the rules relating to the revival of the domicile of origin when a domicile of choice is abandoned. For example, a husband with a domicile of origin in Japan establishes a domicile of choice in China where he marries a woman with a French domicile. When the relationship breaks down, he abandons his home in China and goes to live in Singapore. Immediately upon his leaving China, his Japanese domicile revives and his wife's domicile also changes to that of Japan even though she might never have set foot in that country. To avoid both the patriarchal implications and potentially unfortunate legal consequences implicit in the domicile of dependence, many states have amended their laws to permit women to retain their domicile of origin upon marriage, or to establish a domicile of choice independently of the husband during the subsistence of the marriage. In cases where the spouses have different domiciles, the choice of law rule must refer to both lex domicilii.

Habitual residence may be a more satisfactory connecting factor than domicile because a person's long-term residence would appear to offer a more practical basis for recognition, whatever his or her intentions may be. Although intention is relevant to establishing a person's habitual residence, it is a less demanding test than for domicile. But it could lead to forum shopping with a Petitioner living in a state only long enough to establish habitual residence under that state's law and so evade obligations or gain unfair advantages. All U.S. States have time periods for establishing residency before divorce jurisdiction can be granted.

Habitual residence has become the leading factor in unraveling a jurisdiction entanglement revolving custody issues raised in a divorce action. Parents may live in separate states when filing for a divorce. Divorce laws allow the parents to file the divorce in either state. However, custody laws only allow jurisdiction to exist in the state where the child or children reside. In 1997 the Uniform Child Custody Enforcement Jurisdiction Act (UCCJEA) was created to address the question of which state has jurisdiction over a child custody case. The UCCJEA primarily rules jurisdiction goes with the state of habitual residence of the child.

Within the European Union, but excluding the member nation of Denmark, Regulation 2201/2003 (known as Brussels II) sets out the rules on jurisdiction and the recognition and enforcement of judgments in matrimonial matters and in matters of parental responsibility for children of both spouses except for orders relating to matrimonial property. Jurisdiction is allowed to the courts of the Member State in which one or both spouses had a common domicile, a common nationality or were habitually resident. Once proceedings have been initiated, other states must refuse jurisdiction. Once a court accepts jurisdiction, it is for the lex fori to apply its own choice of law rules: both Ireland and the United Kingdom apply the lex domicilii; the other EU states apply the law of habitual residence.

=== Quasi- or extra-legal proceedings ===
The most common forms of quasi-legal divorce are the Islamic forms of divorce known as the talaq and its less well-regulated version of triple talaq, and the form of divorce in Judaism known as the get which is regulated by the Beth Din. Unlike the talaq, the process to obtain a get must occur at a specific place and with specified documents.

==== The talaq ====
For a discussion of the relationship between the talaq and secular laws, see talaq in non-Islamic states. Otherwise, there is a clear public policy need to consider whether, in an increasingly multi-racial and multi-ethnic society, transnational Islamic divorces can or should be recognized. For these purposes, a distinction is usually drawn between the Nikah form of talaq which is the normative form of procedural talaq, and the classical bare form of talaq which is used in India and in Azad Kashmir.

If the talaq is executed in a state where it is effective to terminate the marriage, this potentially affects the status and capacity of the spouses so that they are then free to remarry. Within the conflict system, the enforcement of foreign judgments is a reasonably well-regulated area. But this form of divorce is only quasi-judicial at best, so it falls outside the normal rules. The general expectation as to choice of law depends on the characterization of the issue. As a form of divorce, the rule might be that the lex loci actus (the law of the place where the transaction took place) should be applied and recognized universally so that the parties would avoid a limping marriage (i.e. that whether they are considered married will change depending on which states they visit or reside in). However, this may be against public policy because one of the parties is seeking to evade some mandatory provisions of law or it is not in the best interests of any children (see parens patriae). If the characterization is status/capacity, this will be determined under the lex domicilii (the law of the domicile) in a common law state, and under the lex patriae (the law of the nationality) or habitual residence in a civil law state. Alternatively, the court seized of the matter might apply the lex fori (the municipal law of the forum state).

The best answer is always to produce an in rem solution, i.e. wherever possible, the result must be accepted in the majority of states around the world. Thus, if the talaq is effective under the lex loci actus and recognized under the laws relevant to determine status and capacity, it will be recognized so long as the best interests of the children are protected in any orders or agreements made by the parties. For example, in English law, Part II of the Family Law Act 1986 draws the distinction between a divorce obtained by "judicial or other proceedings" and the divorce obtained "otherwise than by means of proceedings". The Nikah form is recognized in UK if:

- it is effective by the lex loci actus (the law of the place where it was obtained), and
- at the relevant date, either party was:

habitually resident in,
domiciled either in accordance with the local law or English law, or
a national of that foreign country.

But a "bare" talaq will only be recognized in UK if:

- it is effective by the law of the country where it was obtained and
- at the relevant date, each party was domiciled in that country (or if only one was domiciled in that country, then the other was domiciled in another country where the bare talaq was recognized).

And no recognition will be allowed if one of the parties has been habitually resident in the UK throughout the period of one year immediately preceding the pronouncement. The intention is to prevent one spouse from evading the local judicial system by traveling to a country that does permit the talaq.

==== The Get ====
The discussion as to choice of law for the talaq is the same and, applying the Family Law Act 1986, the get qualifies under the first limb as "judicial or other proceedings".

==== Japanese divorce ====
Japanese family law is designed to encourage the private resolution of family issues. Under the "family registration" (koseki) system, changes in family status and relationships do not require official approval. Article 763 of the Civil Code of Japan authorizes a husband and wife to divorce by mutual agreement (kyogi rikon divorces), and more than 90% of all Japanese divorces adopt this fast, simple and entirely non-judicial procedure. Kyogi rikon divorces are entirely non-judicial without the involvement of lawyers or any tribunal. The only requirements are that each spouse should sign a form, known as a rikon todoke, in front of two witnesses, and that the form should be filed with the local registration office. The parties do not need to make any appearance at the registry office. International couples may obtain a consent divorce in Japan if one of them is a Japanese citizen: Horei Law on the Application of Laws, Law No. 10 of 1898 (as amended 2001), Art. 16. If the parties cannot agree, judicial divorces may be obtained through the court system.

The standard consent divorces (kyogi rikon) have been recognised as "proceedings" within the meaning of the Family Law Act 1986, such divorces can be recognized if either spouse was domiciled in Japan at the time.

=== Maintenance ===
In the EU, Regulation 44/2001 of 22 December 2000 on Jurisdiction and the Recognition and Enforcement of Judgments in Civil and Commercial Matters (known as Brussels I) and Regulation 805/2004 of 21 April 2004 in respect of Uncontested Claims allow the almost automatic enforcement of all orders affecting maintenance when the parties are domiciled or habitually resident in the Member States with the exception of Denmark. The only exceptions are that enforcement would breach public policy in some way, the maintenance order cannot be reconciled with another judgment, or the application to enforce is "out of time".

The United Nations Convention on the Recovery Abroad of Maintenance ("New York Convention") enables the transnational recovery of maintenance by creating a Central Authority for Maintenance Recovery in the Department of Justice, Equality and Law Reform which is responsible for transmitting and receiving maintenance claims under the Convention.

Quick Divorce in the Dominican Republic is available to foreigners or Dominican citizens residing abroad, when both spouses agree to file this divorce before Dominican Courts. This procedure is very simple and only requires the attendance of one of the spouses during the hearing which takes usually less than half an hour and you can leave Dominican Republic the same day in the afternoon. It takes ten to fifteen days to obtain a divorce decree, which is to be sent to your home or office by courier (DHL or FedEx).

The parties should sign a settlement agreement revised by an attorney in their jurisdiction in order to confirm it complies with spouses local laws. This document should include spouses complete data, a list of property, or statement of non-property, the statement regarding minor children and support agreement, your desire of divorcing before a Dominican Court and the authorization of one of the spouses to the other to attend to hearing on her/his behalf. The settlement agreement can be drafted by an attorney in your jurisdiction.

== See also ==
- Family Law Act (Alberta, Canada)
