= Macmillan Inc v Bishopsgate Investment Trust plc (No 3) =

MacMillan Inc v Bishopsgate Investment Trust plc (No 3)
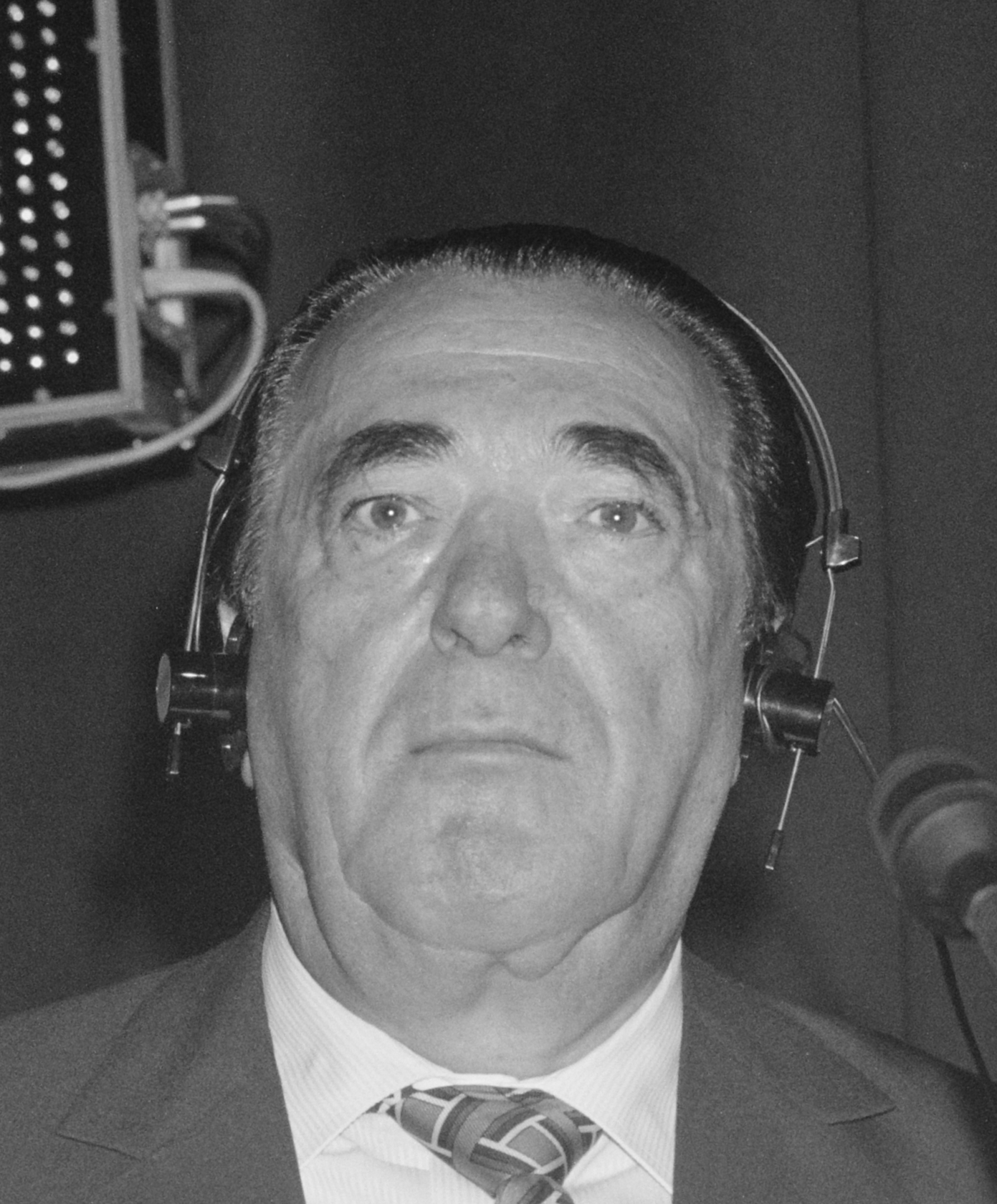
- Robert Maxwell
- Court: Court of Appeal
- Full case name: MacMillan Inc v Bishopsgate Investment Trust plc and Others (No 3)
- Decided: 2 November 1995
- Citations: [1995] EWCA Civ 55 [1996] 1 WLR 387 [1996] 1 All ER 585

Case history
- Appealed from: [1995] 1 WLR 978 [1995] 3 All ER 747
- Subsequent action: Macmillan Inc v Bishopsgate Investment Trust plc (No 4) [1998] EWCA Civ 1680
- Related actions: Macmillan Inc v Bishopsgate Investment Trust plc (No 1) [1993] 1 WLR 1372; Macmillan Inc v Bishopsgate Investment Trust Plc (No 2) [1995] 5 WLUK 313

Court membership
- Judges sitting: Staughton LJ, Auld LJ and Aldous LJ

Keywords
- conflict of laws; lex situs; company shares; mortgage; fraud; characterisation; renvoi; priority

Macmillan Inc v Bishopsgate Investment Trust plc (No 3) [1995] EWCA Civ 55, [1996] WLR 387 is a judicial decision relating to English trusts law and conflict of laws case from the Court of Appeal. The issue arose in relation to frauds conducted by the late Robert Maxwell.

The appeal was not actually an appeal on the full decision, but an appeal to determine a preliminary issue: specifically whether the proper law to determine the issue was English law or New York law. Macmillan argued that the main issue was a claim in restitution, and so the proper law to determine the issue was English law. The respondent banks argued that the main issue was who had title to the shares, and so the proper law to determine that issue was New York law. The reported decision is one of a series of cases in relation to the fraud, and probably the most widely reported and cited decision within that series.

The trial at first instance on the full facts ([1995] 1 WLR 978, before Millett J) had taken "the best part of a year, from October 1992 to July 1993". The respondent banks won at first instance and upon appeal.

== Facts ==
Macmillan Inc was a company incorporated in Delaware, and which was controlled by Robert Maxwell. It owned a majority shareholding in Berlitz International Inc, a New York company. Under the direction of Maxwell the shares in Berlitz were transferred to Bishopsgate Investments Trust plc (a company owned and controlled by Robert Maxwell and his family) as its nominee. Then, without Macmillan's consent or knowledge, the shares were mortgaged by Bishopsgate to secure loans from three different financial institutions to fund Maxwell's private interests. Accordingly, although it was named as the first defendant in the action, Bishopsgate played little part – the main dispute was fought between Macmillan and the banks who had loaned money to Robert Maxwell on the strength of the Berlitz shares as collateral.

The central issue in the case was who had better title to the shares: Macmillan as beneficiary under a trust, or the financial institutions as mortgagees. The key to determining these issues was deciding which was the proper law to determine title to the shares. The only previous case relating to this issue (Colonial Bank Ltd v Cady and Williams (1890) 15 App Cas 267) had been decided over a century before, followed by an "astonishing period of legal barrenness in judicial and academic consideration". However, in the present case the issue was complicated by the fact that many of the shares were held indirectly through a securities depository, Depository Trust Company.

At first instance Millett J held that the proper law to determine priority of claims was the lex loci contractus which was New York law. Accordingly, the banks prevailed. Macmillan appealed against the decision, and it was agreed to hear the appeal as to what the proper law to determine the issue was as a preliminary point. The case was conducted largely under the assumption was that if New York law determined title, then the banks would win because they had no actual notice of wrongdoing. But if English law determined title, then Macmillan had an arguable case that the banks had constructive notice of Robert Maxwell's fraud on the grounds they ought to have known he was engaging in fraud when he caused the shares to be mortgaged for the benefit of loans to his private businesses.

== Judgment ==
=== First instance ===
The matter came before Millett J at first instance. It was an enormous trial, lasting over a year. There were 53 witnesses, and the pleadings alone ran to over 1,000 pages. At the end of his judgment, Millett J castigated the complexity and expense in relation to the way the arguments were put:

The trial began on 26 October 1992. It finished on 30 July 1993. But even that was not the end: further evidence was adduced by consent in November 1993. Since the trial began the subject matter of the action (Berlitz) and the plaintiff (Macmillan) have both been sold; one defendant (Credit Suisse) has been taken over by another (Swiss Volksbank); and Macmillan's parent company, M.C.C. has emerged under a plan of reorganisation approved by the New York Court.

The pleadings filled nearly 1,000 pages. They obscured the issues. When I asked for the issues to be clarified, the parties could not agree what they were. Witness statements were obtained from 53 witnesses, of whom 36 gave oral evidence and were cross-examined, many of them at considerable length. Opinions on foreign law were obtained from 12 witnesses, almost all of whom were cross examined at length. Documents in the case filled more than 120 lever arch files. The experts' reports on foreign law with accompanying authorities filled 24 files. The parties' opening and closing submissions with accompany authorities filled a further 40 files.

Much of this was unnecessary. There was a huge amount of duplication and unnecessary elaboration.

At the conclusion of the trial, Millett J issued a lengthy judgment, which was only partially reported in the law reports. Regrettably, for brevity key parts of the decision relating to recharacterisation (which were not challenged on appeal) were left unreported. In relation to the issue which engaged the Court of Appeal, Millett J followed the House of Lords' decision in Colonial Bank v Cady and Williams (1890) 15 App Cas 267, and held that the proper law to determine the validity of the transfer was the law of the place of the transfer (the lex loci actus), which was New York law.

=== Court of Appeal ===
All three judges in the Court of Appeal gave reasoned decisions. One of the most common criticisms of the decision is that although all three judges agreed as to the outcome (that New York law applied), they all gave different reasons - and all of their reasons were different from that of the trial judge.

==== Staughton LJ ====
The first decision was given by Staughton LJ. He indicated that in relation to a conflict of laws problem, the court essentially has a three-stage problem:

There are in essence three issues before us, corresponding to the three stages in a conflict case which I have mentioned. They are: (a) how does one characterise the question in this action? (b) What connecting factor does our conflict rule provide for questions of that character? (c) What system of law does that connecting factor require to be applied?

He then summarised the facts and reviewed the issues each in turn.

In relation to Stage 1 (characterisation), Macmillan contended the claim relating to restitution (unjust enrichment), and so the issue should be decided in accordance with Rule 201, sub-rule (c) of Dicey & Morris (12th ed.). In the context of this case, that would result in the application of English law, as the law of the place where the enrichment occurs. However he rejected that characterisation - the issue was not whether the banks were enriched - it was whether they had a good defence to the return of the shares. In that case it was not a question of characterising the claim, but characterising the core issue.

In relation to Stage 2 (choice of law) he held that the relevant law was clearly that of the lex situs of the property, and cited various authorities in support including Winkworth v Christie Manson and Woods Ltd [1980] Ch 496 and Inglis v Robertson [1898] AC 616. But he noted that those cases related to goods, and that the same rule applied in relation to negotiable instruments. However, in relation to intangible property such as choses in action, the usual rule was the priority was determined by the proper law of the chose in action, not its situs (citing Dicey & Morris (12th ed.), Rule 123). He then considered whether shares have "a rule of their own". He noted that the evidence of American law (as the law under which the company who issued the shares was incorporated), shares were not negotiable instruments (following Williams v Colonial Bank sub nom Cady (1888) 38 Ch D 388 at 403). He reviewed Cady in some detail and confessed to finding it difficult to draw the boundaries between the issues being discussed. Then with slightly abrupt suddenness he held:

I conclude that an issue as to who has title to the shares in a company should be decided by the law of the place where the shares are situated (lex situs). ... and in this case, that is the law of the place where the company is incorporated. There may be cases where it is arguably the law of the place where the share register is kept, but that problem does not arise today. The reference is to the domestic law of the place in question; at one time there was an argument for renvoi, but mercifully (or sadly, as the case may be) that has been abandoned.

He then went on to consider Stage 3 (system of law). He held that "[w]hether it be situs, place of incorporation or place of share register, the answer is the law of land prevailing in the State of New York."

==== Auld LJ ====
The second (and shortest) judgment was given by Auld LJ. He opened by summarising the issue as "Who has the better right to ownership of shares in a corporation?" He also noted that Macmillan framed this issue as a claim for restitution, but the banks asserted it was an issue of priority of claims in relation to an asset. He reviewed the recent cases in what was called "receipt-based restitutionary claims" and referred to academic articles which cautioned about how new developments in domestic law should be treated when applying historical choice of law rules. He noted that the usual rule in relation to property claims was to apply the lex situs, and then expresses doubts as to whether choice of law based on restitutionary claims is advisable in this case. He noted that the claim for unjust enrichment was difficult in any event, as the banks gave full value. He eventually concluded that "even if the facts could support a claim for unjust enrichment, it is the issue that determined the matter. As I have said, it is essentially a proprietary one". He rejected the view of the trial judge that the lex loci actus was applicable to the issue.

Turning to the issue of what the lex situs of shares was, he review the authorities which he felt were unsatisfactory. He stated that:

In my view, there is authority and much to be said for treating issues of priority of ownership of shares in a corporation according to the lex situs of those shares. That will normally be the country where the register is kept, usually but not always the country of incorporation. If the shares are negotiable the lex situs will be where the pieces of paper constituting the negotiable instruments are at the time of transfer.

He then also reviewed Cady and distinguished it. He affirmed that the proper law to determine the issue was New York law. Although he did not explicitly reject renvoi he stated that the proper law was "the domestic law of New York.

==== Aldous LJ ====
The third and final judgment was given by Aldous LJ. After setting out the facts again in some detail, he also affirmed that Macmillan had argued its case on the basis that English law was the proper law to determine the issue as the issue before the court was one of restitution. Conversely the banks argued that this was an issue as to who had the better priority to the shares as a matter of property law. As with the other judges in the Court of Appeal, Aldous LJ felt that this was an issue of property law. He held: "The issue being one of priority, the law having the closest and most real connection must be New York law. That is the law which governs the right in dispute, namely the right to be placed on the register." He went on to expound:

I have no doubt that the transferability of shares in a corporation, the formalities necessary to transfer them and the right of the transferee to be registered on the books of the corporation as the owner of the shares are all governed by the law of incorporation.

He then proceeded with his own review of Cady (which he asserted supported his position). He also cited a long string of North American decisions relating to the issue. He then concluded: "I believe the appropriate law to decide questions of title to property, such as shares, is the lex situs, which is the same as the law of incorporation."

=== Overview ===
Although the case is often held up as being determinative of the lex situs of a share in a company, and/or as determining that the doctrine of renvoi does not apply to intangible property, neither of those points were actually in issue in the case. Macmillan argued for an entirely separate choice of law issue relating to a different characerisation. And the comments of the Court of Appeal in relation to the situs of shares all agreed that they were located in New York, but expressed somewhat different views as to why that was so. The decision that renvoi was not applicable was similarly not argued, as both sides were content that any reference to a foreign law should solely be to the domestic law. Similarly, neither party argued for a different choice of law rule on the basis that the shares were held through intermediaries rather than directly held.

In relation to whether different issues applied to shares that were negotiable, again the court did not speak with one voice. Both Staughton and Auld LJJ expressed the view that negotiable shares were subject to a different choice of law rule - the law of the place where the relevant certificates were located. But they differed in their judgments as to which law should determine whether shares were negotiable or not: Staughton LJ indicating it was the lex fori and Auld suggesting it was the law of the place where act of negotiation occurs. Ooi rejects both as incorrect. She favours the view of Aldous LJ who implies that the situs of a share, even when negotiable, is the place of the company's incorporation.

== Reception ==
The case broadly received a mixed reception from commentators. It is accepted as authoritative in relation to its approach to characterisation. However its rejection of renvoi is not seen as completely definitive.

In relation to the main subject for which the case is normally cited, the situs of shares in a company, Dicey Morris & Collins accept it as good authority, but note that it has to be read against a large group of cases which seek to impose a different situs in different situations for different purposes. Hill treats it as largely authoritative with respect to the choice of the lex situs, but refrains from commenting upon the identification of the situs for shares. In that regard it is hard to treat it as a definitive statement of the law. Maisie Ooi in her definitive work on the subject expresses discomfort in relation to the parts of the judgment which refer to the situs of shares being determined by the place of the register.

== Subsequent decisions ==
The Supreme Court endorsed the decision in Akers v Samba Financial Group [2017] UKSC 6. Notably Lord Sumption summarised its effects as "transmission of property is governed by the lex situs, which in the case of registered shares is the law of the company's incorporation... This proposition is well established and was not seriously disputed: see Macmillan Inc v Bishopsgate Investment Trust Plc (No 3) [1996] 1 WLR 387." (at para [80]). Lord Mance also referred to the decision with approval, but did not comment specifically on the lex situs of shares.

The case was also cited as authoritative for its proposition in relation to the choice of law process in Raiffeisen Zentralbank Österreich AG v Five Star General Trading LLC [2001] EWCA Civ 68, [2001] QB 825

In Dornoch Ltd v Westminster International BV [2009] EWHC 889 (Admlty) Tomlinson J suggested that the conflicting decisions in Macmillan as to the situs of the shares are actually misconstrued. In his judgment he noted that:

The reasoning in Macmillan cannot of course be understood without paying careful attention to the characterisation of the issue to which it was directed. Thus if transfer of shares may be effected only by registration on a particular register, the shares must inevitably be regarded as situate at the place where the register is kept for the purpose of ascertaining the efficacy of any purported transfer. However for the purpose of ascertaining the priority of competing proprietary or security interests falling short of registered ownership, only Auld LJ in the Court of Appeal seemed to regard the law of the place where the register is kept as significant – see [1996] 1 WLR 387 at 411E. In that case however the place of incorporation, the place where the share certificates were at the time of the relevant transactions and the place where the share register was kept were all the same, New York, so the point did not need to be decided.

In other words, the issue of situs depends upon the purpose. For a transfer it is (or may well be) the place of the register. But for the purposes of priority of title, it is the place of incorporation. This also accords with some older judicial decisions such as Brassard v Smith [1925] AC 371 which indicated: "there are ... so many qualities of a share which are attributable to different places it would seem to follow that there cannot be a proper local habitation for a share at all."

== Criticism ==
There have been various criticisms of the judgment, although not all of them are universally supported.

- Certain academics were highly critical of the decision for its unceremonious rejection of the doctrine of renvoi. However other academics endorsed that as removing the "onerous, expensive, and time-consuming" enquiries that the doctrine results in.
- In each case the judges entirely overlooked the fact that the relevant shares were held in a depository system, which most lawyers consider changes the nature of the property for choice of law purposes. However, this may be because of the way that the case was pleaded and argued.
- But the most common criticism is that in reach three different analyses which led to the same result, it is extremely difficult to tell what the authoritative ratio decidendi of the case is.

== See also ==
- Bishopsgate Investment Management Ltd v Maxwell (No 2) [1993] BCLC 814

== Sources ==
- Collins, Lawrence (2012). Dicey, Morris & Collins: The Conflict of Laws (15th ed.). Sweet & Maxwell. ISBN 978-0-414-02453-3.
- Hill, Jonathan (2016). Clarkson & Hill's Conflict of Laws (5th ed.). OUP. ISBN 978-0-19-873229-7.
- Ooi, Maisie (2003). Shares and Other Securities in the Conflict of Laws. OUP. ISBN 0-19-925613-6.
- Torremans, Paul (2017). Cheshire, North & Fawcett: Private International Law (15th ed.). OUP. ISBN 978-0-19-967899-0.
