= Huber v Steiner =

English choice of law case

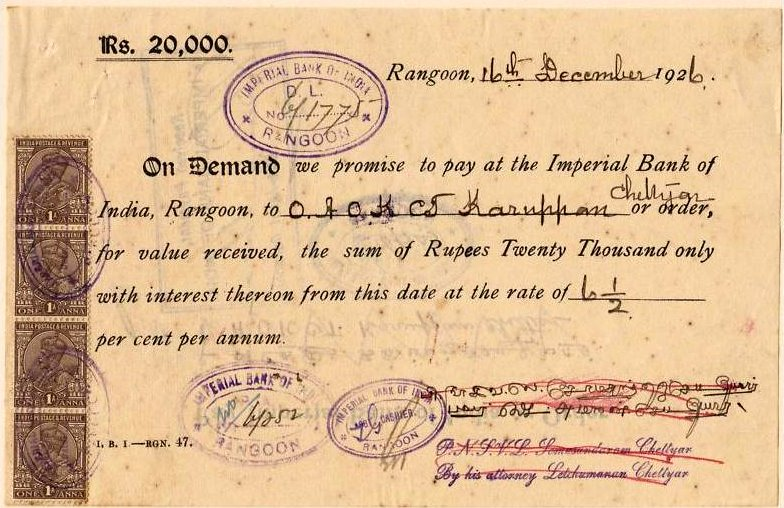
- Promissory note
- Court: Court of Common Pleas
- Full case name: Huber v Steiner
- Decided: 17 June 1835
- Citations: (1835) 2 Bing (NC) 202; 1 Hodg 206; 2 Scott 304; 132 ER 80
- Transcript: StuDocU

Court membership
- Judge sitting: Tindal CJ

Keywords
- conflict of laws; limitation periods; promissory note; procedure

Huber v Steiner (1835) 2 Bing (NC) 202 was a judicial decision of the English Court of Common Pleas relating to choice of law issues in connection with a promissory note.

Huber brought a claim against Steiner in England on a promissory note which had been issued in France. Under French law, the relevant limitation period had expired. The court accepted that the proper law of the promissory note was French law, but the issue was whether the limitation bar was a substantive rule or a procedural one.

The court held that the French limitation period was a procedural rule, and as matters of procedure were determined by the laws of the forum (ie. English law in this case) then irrespective of the fact that the promissory note was governed by French law, the French limitation period would not apply to a case before the English court.

Although the decision in the case is regarded as correct and the precedent is sound, a different result would follow today as a result of the statutory changes brought about by the Foreign Limitation Periods Act 1984 and the Rome I Regulation.

== Facts ==
The two parties to the action, Huber and Steiner, were merchants who were domiciled in and carrying on business in France. On 12 May 1813 the defendant, Steiner, issued a promissory payable to the order of the claimant, Huber. The promissory note was made and delivered in Mulhausen, France. The note provided for repayment in just under four years: on 10 May 1817. Shortly after making the note, both parties left Mulhausen. Huber went to Switzerland, and Steiner went to England, where he resided continuously thereafter.

Steiner failed to make payment on the promissory note when due, and Huber brought the action against him in England.

== Trial ==
The trial initially came before Vaughan J sitting with a jury. The court found for the plaintiff in the substantive action, and dismissed the expert evidence that under French law the limitation period had expired. Under French law it was argued that the limitation period expired after five years (as opposed to England, where it expired after six). The claim had been brought in time under the English limitation rules, but was alleged to be barred by the operation of French limitation rules.

The defendant appealed to the Court of Common Pleas by way of case stated. The matter came before Tindal CJ. It was broadly accepted by counsel for all parties that if the French limitation rule was a substantive rule (ie. the claim was negated by the effluxion of time), then because the promissory note was governed by French law there would be a good defence. However if the French rule was only procedural (ie. it barred the remedy but did not extinguish the right) then it would not apply, as the English court would always apply its own procedure to matters before it and foreign procedural rules were not to be applied.

== Judgment of Tindal CJ ==
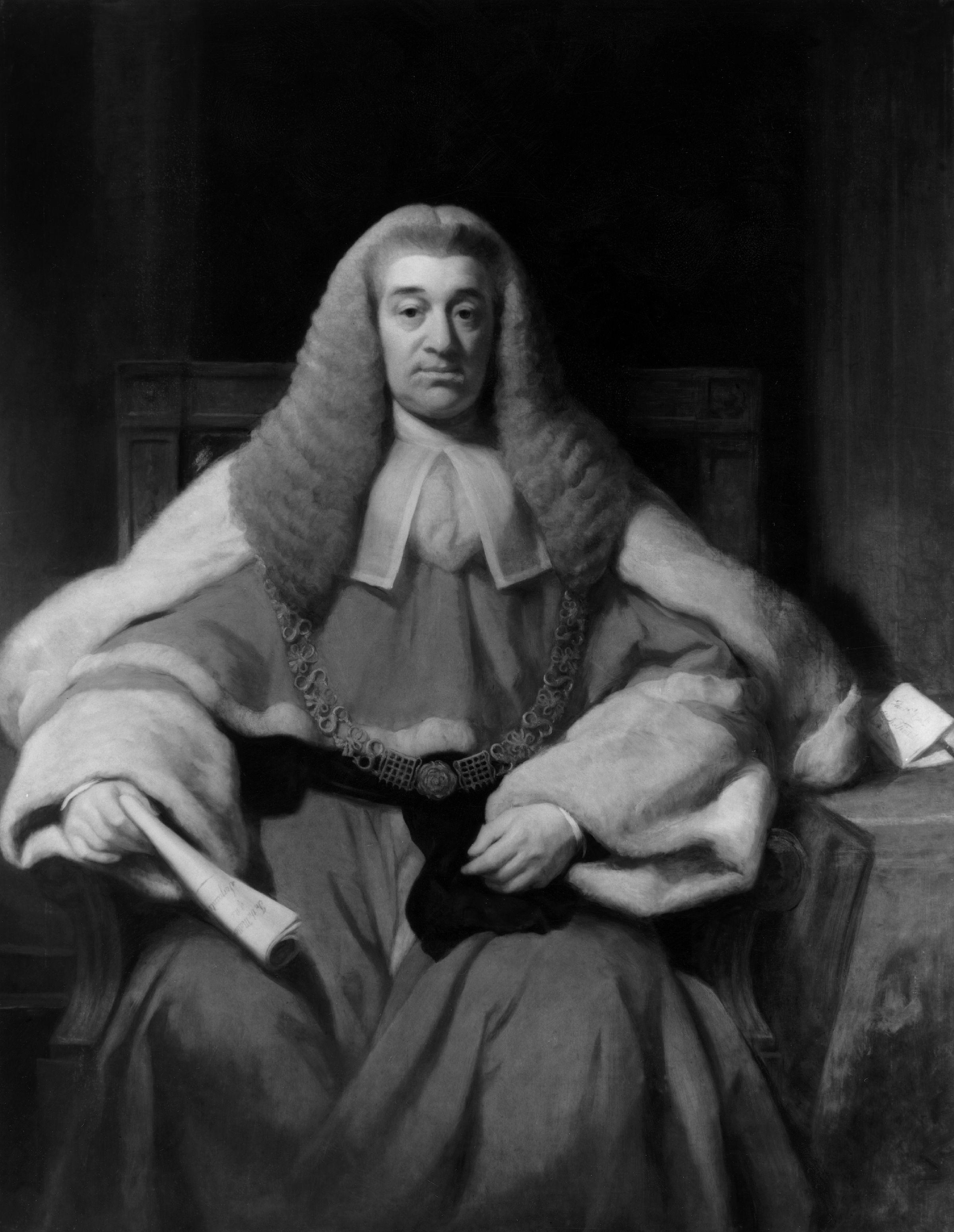
Tindal C

Although both counsel agreed upon the basic principle of law, the Chief Justice reviewed the position quite carefully. He considered the case of British Linen Company v Drummond (1830) 10 B&C 903, 109 ER 683 and the authorities cited therein. He also considered at length the treatise by the American jurist, Joseph Story in his Commentaries on the Conflict of Laws. He then agreed the basic principle that if a foreign rule was procedural it should not be applied in English proceedings. But if it were substantive, and that relevant foreign law was the proper law to determine the issue, then it should. He expressed the point in judicial language characteristic of the era:

The distinction between that part of the law of the foreign country where a personal contract is made, which is adopted, and that which is not adopted by our English courts of law, is well known and established; namely, that so much of the law as affects the rights and merit of the contract, all that relates ad litis decisionem, is adopted from the foreign country; so much of the law as affects the remedy only, all that relates ad litis ordinationem, is taken from the lex fori of that country where the action is brought; and that in the interpretation of this rule, the time of limitation of the action falls within the latter division, and is governed by the law of the country where the action is brought, and not by the lex loci contractus...

Having determined then, Tindal CJ then considered carefully the relevant provisions of French law (in the original French) as well as the commentaries of noted French legal scholars, including Pothier's Traité des Obligations. He decided that the French rule was a rule of procedure as it only barred the bringing of the claim, but did not extinguish the underlying right. That being the case, it did not apply in English proceedings and the claim on the promissory note was upheld.

== Authority ==
=== Textbook writers ===
Although the position on the specific point of law has subsequently changed under English law, the broad principle upheld in Huber v Steiner is still treated as good law today in England and in other Common Law jurisdictions: that a foreign law which is procedural will not be applied in the English courts, and that matters of procedure are matters which are normally to be determined by the laws of the forum. The leading English law textbooks of Dicey Morris & Collins and Cheshire North & Fawcett both cite Huber v Steiner with approval.

=== Judicial precedent ===
Huber v Steiner has been cited with approval widely in both the courts of England and Wales, and also overseas in relation to the principle for which it stands.

In England it has been cited with approval by the House of Lords in Boys v Chaplin [1971] AC 356, and by the Supreme Court in Harding v Wealands [2006] UKHL 32 at para. 21.

In Australia it has been cited by the High Court of Australia with approval in Stevens v Head [1993] HCA 19, 176 CLR 433.

In the United States, it was cited by the US Supreme Court in Hill v. Tucker (1851) 54 U.S. 458.

In India it was followed in Muthukanni v Andappa, AIR 1955 Mad 96 (FB).
