= Incidental question =

In conflict of laws, an incidental question is a legal issue that arises in connection with the major cause of action in a lawsuit. The forum court will have already decided that it has jurisdiction to hear the case (resolving any issue relating to forum shopping) and will be working through the next two stages of the conflict process, namely: characterisation and choice of law. For example, the court may classify the cause as "succession", but it notes that the plaintiff brings the claim for relief as the deceased's widow. Before the court can adjudicate on the main issue, it must first decide whether the plaintiff actually has the status claimed, i.e. the incidental question would be the validity of the claimed marriage. The inconvenient reality is that many lawsuits involve a number of interdependent legal issues. In purely domestic cases, this poses no difficulty because a judge will freely move from one domestic law to another to resolve the dispute. But in a conflict case, the question is whether the incidental question is resolved by reference either to its own choice of law rules, or to the same law that governs the main issue (the lex causae). States have not formulated a consistent answer to this question.

For an incidental question to arise, the forum court must have applied its characterisation rules to determine that:

- the main cause of action is governed by a foreign law;
- as a precondition to the main cause of action, there is a subsidiary question which has its own choice of law rule pointing to a different lex causae;
- there will be a different result depending on which foreign law is applied.

Suppose that a French court hears the case of an American national who dies domiciled in California leaving movables in England. The French choice of law rule would refer the distribution of personal property to California law which has community property provisions entitling his widow to share in his estate. The marriage was in England and, as both the lex loci celebrationis and the lex situs, English law declares it valid even though it is void ab initio under California law because it is considered bigamous (see nullity): a divorce decree granted by the American courts was recognised as valid in England, but not in California. Should the widow's claim be determined by the English or California law? There are different views:

- the widow's claim should be dismissed because otherwise the French conflict rule that succession to movables is governed by California law would be undermined;
- the widow should be entitled to share in her husband's estate because otherwise the French conflict rule that the validity of the marriage is governed by English law would be undermined.

One of the more interesting cases on this topic is the Canadian Supreme Court case of Schwebel v Ungar [1964] 48 DLR (2d) 644 in which a Jewish husband and wife, domiciled in Hungary, married in Hungary. While they were emigrating to Israel, they found themselves in Italy and the husband divorced his wife by get. Under the laws of Hungary (their lex domicilii) and Italy, the religious form of divorce was invalid, but it was recognised as effective by the law of Israel where they acquired a domicile of choice. Subsequently, the wife moved to Canada and, without abandoning her Israeli domicile, went through a second ceremony of marriage. The second husband petitioned for nullity alleging that the marriage was bigamous. The Supreme Court held the marriage to be valid. The main question was the wife's capacity to marry which, under Canadian law, is determined by her lex domicilii, i.e. the law of Israel at the time of the second ceremony. The incidental question was the validity of the divorce which was to be determined either by their lex domicilii at the relevant time or by Italian law as the lex loci actus. The judgment seems to suggest that the court decided both questions by reference to the law of Israel as the law governing the main question.

In Lawrence v Lawrence [1985] Fam 106 the English Court of Appeal was asked by the second husband to rule on the validity of another potentially bigamous marriage. The wife first married in Brazil and then divorced the husband in Nevada (this was not recognised in Brazil) and immediately married the second husband in Nevada. The two laws were the wife's lex domicilii to which English choice of law rules referred her capacity to marry (under Brazilian law she lacked capacity to marry the second husband) and the validity of the second marriage which was determined under the lex loci celebrationis. The case was decided by characterising the case as one of divorce recognition rather than capacity to marry.

The outcome suggests that the same law will be applied to both the main and the incidental questions on the understanding that the forum court is probably making a policy decision on which outcome is the more desirable – in both cases, the courts seem to have been interested in upholding the validity of the second marriage reflecting a rebuttable presumption in both jurisdictions to recognise marriages valid under their lex loci celebrationis in default of any strong policy reason to the contrary.
