= Jonathan Harris (barrister) =

British barrister and legal scholar

Jonathan Harris, QC (Hon.) is a British barrister and legal scholar. He works as a barrister at Serle Court Chambers. He specialises in cross-border, commercial and chancery matters (including jurisdiction, enforcement of judgments and choice of law). He has appeared in the Supreme Court and the Privy Council in a number of cases. He has also drafted legislation for a number of jurisdictions.

He is the joint general editor of the private international law textbook, Dicey, Morris and Collins,. He is also the author of The Hague Trusts Convention and co-author of International Sale of Goods in the Conflict of Laws. He is also a co-editor of the Journal of Private International Law and Oxford Private International Law Series.

Harris is professor of International Commercial Law at the Dickson Poon School of Law at King's College London. He is a senior research fellow at Jesus College, Oxford and at the Commercial Law Centre, University of Oxford. Jonathan Harris was educated at Jesus College, Oxford.

He has been a Visiting Professorial Fellow at the University of New South Wales, Australia and Visiting Professor at the National University of Singapore.

Jonathan Harris is a member of the Lord Chancellor's Advisory Committee on Private International Law.
