= Characterization (disambiguation) =

Characterization is the representation of a character in a narrative or dramatic work.

Characterization or characterisation may also refer to:

- Characterisation (law), a procedural stage to resolve a lawsuit that involves foreign law
- Characterization (materials science), the broad and general process by which a material's structure and properties are probed and measured
- Characterization (mathematics), a set of conditions that, while possibly different from the definition of the object, is logically equivalent to it
