= Re Maldonado =

Judicial decision

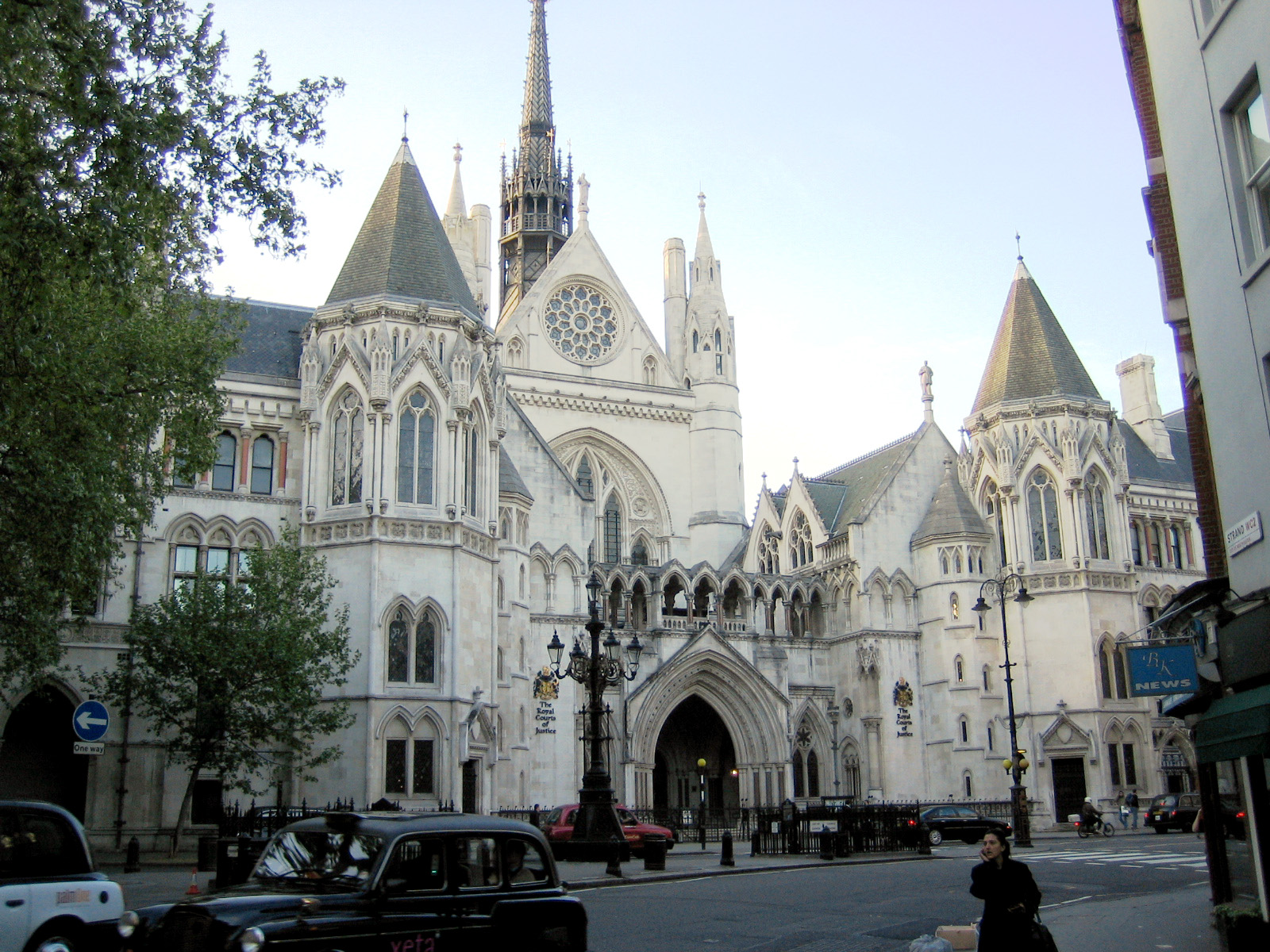
- Royal Courts of Justice
- Court: Court of Appeal
- Full case name: Re Maldonado; State of Spain v Treasury Solicitor
- Decided: 30 November 1953
- Citations: [1954] P 223 [1953] 2 All ER 1579 [1954] 2 WLR 64

Court membership
- Judges sitting: Sir Raymond Evershed MR; Jenkins LJ; Morris LJ

Re Maldonado [1954] P 223 was a judicial decision of the English Court of Appeal relating to who should inherit certain property in the United Kingdom which belonged to an intestate Spanish national who died without any heirs.

Under the English conflict of laws the property of a deceased person is normally distributed in accordance with the law of their domicile. However title to property is normally determined by law of the place where the property is located. Under Spanish law the property would have passed to the Spanish state as 'ultimate heir', but under English law the Crown would take the property as bona vacantia (ownerless property).

The Court of Appeal held that the effect of the Spanish rule was that the Spanish state would inherit under the intestacy of the Spanish national, and therefore the property never became ownerless and the English rules on bona vacantia did not apply.

== Facts ==
Eloisa Hernandez Maldonado was a Spanish subject domiciled in Spain. She died in Spain on 11 October 1924 with no living heirs who were entitled to succeed to her estate on her death under Spanish law. She left property in England - some stocks and shares - valued at the time of her death at the sum of £31,515 5s 4d.

Article 956 of the Spanish Civil Code at the time of her death was translated for the purposes of the case as: "In default of persons having the right to inherit in accordance with the provisions of the foregoing sections the State shall inherit ..."

On 4 June 1930, the State of Spain obtained in Spain a declaration of heirship. The State of Spain then brought proceedings in England claiming that letters of administration should be issued to agents of the Spanish State as the sole and universal heir to her estate by Spanish law. This was opposed by the Treasury Solicitor, who claimed that the property in England should pass to the Crown as bona vacantia.

== High Court ==
The matter initially came before Barnard J on 22 May 1953. After a careful review of the law, he held that on the evidence before him the State of Spain was a true heir just as any individual heir according to Spanish law. He further held that there was nothing contrary to English policy or repugnant to English law in a foreign State being permitted to take possession of the movables of one of its citizens in this country.

He distinguished the earlier decisions in Re Barnett's Trusts [1902] 1 Ch 847 and In the Estate of Musurus [1936] 2 All ER 1666, where the court had previously held that relevant foreign rules (of Austria and Turkey respectively) essentially operated as a matter of property law rather than the law of succession. He therefore granted letters of administration of the English estate.

== Court of Appeal ==
The Treasury Solicitor appealed to the Court of Appeal.

The main decision was given by the Master of the Rolls, Sir Raymond Evershed. Crucially, there was no appeal against the finding of Barnard J as to the proper characterisation of the rule of Spanish law. Nevertheless, the court reviewed the decisions in Re Barnett's Trusts and In the Estate of Musurus, and stressed the differences in how the legal rules were expressed to operate in those jurisdictions. He was satisfied that there was no rule of public policy which precluded a foreign state from inheriting as heir, and upheld the grant of letters of administration.

Jenkins LJ gave a concurring judgment. In concluding his decision, he summarised:

The substance of the matter, as it seems to me, is that by the law to which reference is made, the property in England is not left ownerless, but is to pass to an heir, that heir being the State of Spain.

== Authority ==
The leading English law textbooks of Dicey Morris & Collins and Cheshire North & Fawcett both cite Re Maldonado with approval.

The broad contention that the proper law of succession is the lex domicilii and the law to determine title to property is the lex situs is not controversial. Instead, the case is more normally cited with reference to the proper characterisation of the issue as a matter of the law of succession rather than the law of property.
