= Evasion (law) =

Fundamental public policy doctrine

Evasion in law, is a fundamental public policy doctrine, which exists also in the conflict of laws.

== Definition ==
Although one may legitimately plan affairs to avoid the incidence of obligations or liabilities imposed by the law, but no one may evade the operation of otherwise-mandatory provisions if duties and liabilities have been properly imposed or incurred.

It is a standard doctrine in most jurisdictions: in France, it is termed fraude à la loi; in Spain, fraude de ley; in Italy, frode alla legge; in Germany, Gesetzesumgehung. It reflects the need for governments to prevent their citizens from intentionally and improperly manipulating their behaviour to prevent mandatory provisions in the law from applying to them. As the translated names necessarily imply, the key is an intention to displace the normal operation of the legal system.

Sometimes, that intention is obvious. On other occasions, it is for the courts to decide whether a sufficient intention can be imputed. Once the intention is established, the evasive manoeuvre is void, and the normal legal provisions will apply to the parties.

== Taxation ==
Almost all states operate a collection system for taxation revenues within a framework of law that is enforced by independent courts. Enabling statutes must be strictly applied, and it is generally against public policy to allow the tax administration to agree to reduce the amount of tax payable by any individual. Like criminal law in which agreements by the policing authorities to exempt a criminal are prohibited, tax law has a special status as being essential to an organised society in maintaining public trust through the policy of equal treatment in the legal system.

Nevertheless, a taxpayer who organises affairs to exploit a loophole in the law to avoid the incidence of tax liability will usually be permitted to do so. It is not for the courts to legislate and plug the gaps left by the legislature.

The test of avoidance is whether there is a legitimate purpose for the given behaviour. Many states adopt a "business purpose" test, by decomposing the transaction into its component steps to determine the true purpose of the transaction(s) (see tax avoidance).

== Family law ==
In Family law, the citizens of any state may not be allowed to evade rules like those on marriage by blood relatives or by persons of the same biological sex only by travelling to and going through a ceremony in a state that allows them. The policies underpinning such laws are so fundamental to the culture of a state that they acquire mandatory status (see nullity). The same applies to divorce.

An early case in France (under the civil law system), known as the Princess Bauffremont Affair decided by the Cour de cassation in 1878 [Civ. 18 mars 1878, S.78.1.193 (note Labbé)] saw the princess obtain citizenship in Germany to obtain a divorce there and then remarry. She returned to France where she attempted to re-establish herself. Because the divorce was not recognised in France, her remarriage was declared null as a fraude à la loi.

== Contract law ==
In Contract law, as an exception to the principle of autonomy implicit in the policy of freedom of contract, the parties cannot agree to a voluntary agreement to evade obligations imposed by law or to prevent the courts from taking jurisdiction if a dispute arises.

Also, the courts will examine the entire context for any series of transactions that seeks to avoid the operation of law. Hence, if it is illegal to export particular goods from X to A, such a law cannot be evaded by entering into back-to-back agreements to export the goods first to Y and then to A.

Some laws are so fundamental that they can never be evaded. Thus, even though the contracts might be perfectly legal, they would be denied enforcement if the effect would be against public policy, such as the following:

- protection from unreasonable restraints of trade, such as agreements not to compete after terminating employment or selling a business must allow individuals a reasonable opportunity to earn a living.
- protection of family relationships: an agreement relating to the custody of a child and maintenance cannot exclude the power of a court to examine its terms and to judge whether it is in the best interests of the child.
- Prevention of the enforcement of contracts:
  - involving commission of a tort or crime;
  - inducing breach of fiduciary duties;
  - inducing a breach in a contract with a third party;
  - disclaiming liability for harm caused intentionally, recklessly or negligently (including liability for any misrepresentation). Liability for personal injuries arising from the use of products can be disclaimed only in rare circumstances (for example, if two merchants fairly bargain for it, and the product is experimental).
  - involving the waiver or release of entrenched rights: in the United States, the release of rights granted by the Age Discrimination in Employment Act of 1967, 81 Stat. 602, 29 U.S.C. § 621 will not be effective even if supported by consideration, except under the Older Workers Benefit Protection Act.

== Conflict of laws ==
At either the characterisation or the choice of law stage, the most usual manipulation involves the way in which the connecting factors are pleaded as between the lex fori and the lex loci so that inconvenient local laws are evaded in favour of a "foreign" law.

== Detection ==
Under US Drug Trafficking Vessel Interdiction Act, it is illegal to operate or embark in a submersible vessel or semi-submersible vessel without nationality on an international voyage with the intent to evade detection. That is curious because one of the required proofs of nationality is the documents issued under the 1958 Convention on the High Seas, a convention, which Congress has never acknowledged by ratifying.

== See also ==
- Inchoate offence
- Tax evasion
