= Rome I Regulation =

European Union regulation

States applying Rome instruments Rome I Regulation, Rome Convention Rome Convention

The Rome I Regulation (Regulation (EC) No 593/2008 of the European Parliament and of the Council of 17 June 2008 on the law applicable to contractual obligations) is a regulation which governs the choice of law in the European Union. It is based upon and replaces the Convention on the Law Applicable to Contractual Obligations 1980. The Rome I Regulation can be distinguished from the Brussels Regime which determines which court can hear a given dispute, as opposed to which law it should apply. The regulation applies to all EU member states except Denmark.

Denmark has an opt-out from implementing regulations under the area of freedom, security and justice. The Danish government planned to join the regulation if a referendum on 3 December 2015 approved converting its opt-out into an opt-in, but the proposal was rejected. While the United Kingdom originally opted-out of the regulation, it subsequently decided to opt in.

== Background ==
The regulation sets out which law be used to interpret contracts with an international element (i.e. contracts agreed by parties in different countries). Pursuant to its Articles 28 and 29, the regulation came into force on 17 December 2009 and applies to contracts concluded after that date (beginning 18 December 2009).

== Overview ==
The broad principle of Rome I was not only to harmonise choice of law rules in contract but, subject to certain safeguards, maximise the freedom of the parties to choose the law governing their contractual relations.

=== Exclusions ===
Article 1 contains a list of exclusions from the scope of the Regulation. These include:

1. questions involving the status or legal capacity of natural persons;
2. obligations relating to family relationships (including maintenance obligations or matrimonial property regimes);
3. negotiable instruments such as bills of exchange, cheques and promissory notes;
4. arbitration agreements (which are regulated by the New York Convention) and agreements on the choice of court (which are regulated by the Brussels Regime);
5. matters of company law, including corporate capacity, winding-up and liability of directors and officers;
6. matters of principal and agent;
7. trust law;
8. pre-contractual obligations (which are regulated by the Rome II Regulation); and
9. life insurance contracts.

=== Freedom of choice ===
Article 3 confirms the freedom of parties to choose the governing law of their contracts:

A contract shall be governed by the law chosen by the parties.

The choice of law of the parties can either be expressed in the contract or implied from an agreement that is "clearly demonstrated by the terms of the contract or the circumstances of the case". The implied choice of law must be a real, but not imputed, choice of law that can be objectively ascertained. It is insufficient that the parties would have chosen a particular law if a choice had been made.

It also provides that the parties may agree to change the governing law, or to have different laws govern different parts of the contract.

=== Absence of choice ===
Article 4 deals with contracts where the parties have made no express or implied choice of governing law. It provides broadly that:

1. a contract for the sale of goods shall be governed by the law of the seller's habitual residence;
2. a contract for the provision of services shall be governed by the law of the service provider's habitual residence;
3. a contract relating to land or to a tenancy shall be governed by the law of the country where the property is situated;
4. a franchise contract shall be governed by the law of the country where the franchisee has his habitual residence;
5. a distribution contract shall be governed by the law of the country where the distributor has his habitual residence;
6. a contract for the sale of goods by auction shall be governed by the law of the country where the auction takes place;
7. a contract concluded within an exchange or multilateral system in accordance with non-discretionary rules and governed by a single law, shall be governed by that law.

=== Employment contracts ===
Article 8(2), which supersedes article 6(1) of the 1980 Convention, says,

To the extent that the law applicable to the individual employment contract has not been chosen by the parties, the contract shall be governed by the law of the country in which or, failing that, from which the employee habitually carries out his work in performance of the contract. The country where the work is habitually carried out shall not be deemed to have changed if he is temporarily employed in another country.

The significant change is that the applicable law is that of the country "from which the employee habitually carries out" his or her work. It is intended to cover workers such as airline pilots who might not work "in" any particular country, but work "from" a country.

For a temporary worker posted in another country from her home country, article 8(2) makes the law of the home country apply. It would therefore appear that, for example, the employer of a Greek posted worker in Germany could rely on the lesser protections of Greek law. Article 7(2) of the 1980 Convention stated that 'Nothing in this Convention shall restrict the application of the rules of the law of the forum in a situation where they are mandatory irrespective of the law otherwise applicable to the contract'. Employment law is mandatory. However, article 7(2) was not retained in the Rome I Regulation. The replacement, article 9 defines mandatory provisions as,

provisions the respect for which is regarded as crucial by a country for safeguarding its public interests, such as its political, social or economic organisation, to such an extent that they are applicable to any situation falling within their scope, irrespective of the law otherwise applicable to the contract under this Regulation.

It is clear that employment law is applicable in any situation to a contract falling within its scope, though some have insisted, sceptically, that employment law may not be "crucial" in this sense, following older case law of the ECJ.

=== Mandatory provisions ===
Article 9 states that:

1. Overriding mandatory provisions are provisions the respect for which is regarded as crucial by a country for safeguarding its public interests, such as its political, social or economic organisation, to such an extent that they are applicable to any situation falling within their scope, irrespective of the law otherwise applicable to the contract under this Regulation. 2. Nothing in this Regulation shall restrict the application of the overriding mandatory provisions of the law of the forum.

=== Scope of applicable law ===
Article 12 provides that the applicable law shall govern:

1. interpretation;
2. performance;
3. the consequences of a total or partial breach of obligations, including the assessment of damages;
4. the various ways of extinguishing obligations, and prescription and limitation of actions;
5. the consequences of nullity of the contract.

However, in relation to the manner of performance and the steps to be taken in the event of defective performance, regard must be had to the law of the country in which performance takes place.

=== Assignment and subrogation ===
The relationship between an assignor and an assignee under an assignment or contractual rights (including by way of security) against another obligor under the original contract is governed by the applicable law of the contract of assignment.

However, the applicable law of the original agreement (under which rights are being assigned) will determine if those rights are assignable, and what the relationship between the assignee and the obligor is.

One of the criticisms of Rome I is that it does not address the problems caused by successive assignments (by way of security or absolutely) and the determination of priorities between subsequent assignees. Further consultations were intended in relation to these issues, and those consultations have suggested alternative possibilities, but no definitive solution.

Similar rules apply to transfers of contractual rights by way of subrogation. Whether or not a right of subrogation arises as a matter of law depends upon the applicable law between the parties between whom the subrogation operates, and not the contract in relation to which the rights are subrogated. So, for example: Mr X deposits property with Mr Y under a contract of bailment governed by German law, and during that period that property is damaged. Mr X claims under his policy of insurance governed by English law with Z Co, who pays the claim. It will be a matter of English law whether Z Co is subrogated to any right of action which Mr X might have had against Mr Y under the original contract of bailment.

=== Set-off ===
Article 17 provides that "the right to set-off is not agreed by the parties, set-off shall be governed by the law applicable to the claim against which the right to set-off is asserted." This is potentially problematic, as by definition set-off deals with two separate claims. It seems that set-off is to be viewed defensively with respect to each claim, which creates the possibility of asymmetric application (i.e. set-off might operate to partly extinguish a German law claim, but not partly extinguish the Spanish claim which is relied upon to do so). The better view would presumably be that the set-off must be operative under each governing law to be effective under either.

=== Burden of proof ===
Although procedural matters are largely excluded from Rome I, Article 18 does state that where an applicable law raises presumptions (such as the presumption of advancement) or specifies the burden of proof, then those rules shall apply to the contractual obligations.

=== Renvoi ===
Article 20 excludes the application of the doctrine of renvoi in relation to contracts.

=== Public policy ===
Article 21 provides:

The application of a provision of the law of any country specified by this Regulation may be refused only if such application is manifestly incompatible with the public policy (ordre public) of the forum.

== United Kingdom ==
The United Kingdom originally opted out of the regulation, but subsequently decided to opt-in. As of September 2022, following Brexit, the regulation is retained EU law within the UK, subject to minor amendments.

== See also ==
- Brussels Regime
- Rome II Regulation, relating to non-contractual obligations
- Posted Workers Directive
- UK labour law
- UNIDROIT
