= Renvoi =

Subset of choice of law rules when there is conflict

In conflict of laws, renvoi (from the French, meaning "send back" or "to return unopened") is a subset of the choice of law rules and it may be applied whenever a forum court is directed to consider the law of another state.

== The procedure for conflict cases ==
1. The court must first decide whether it has the jurisdiction to hear the case (which will involve addressing the question of whether the plaintiff is attempting to manipulate the judicial system by forum shopping).
2. Characterisation. The court must analyse the case as pleaded and allocate each component to its appropriate legal classification, each of which will have one or more choice of law rules attached to it.
3. The court will then apply the choice of law rules. In a limited number of cases, usually involving family law issues, an incidental question may arise which will complicate this process.

== Discussion ==
To limit the damage that would result from forum shopping, it is desirable that the same law be applied to achieve the same result no matter where the case is litigated. The system of renvoi is an attempt to achieve that end. If a forum court is directed to consult a foreign law, the first question it must address is whether this is a reference solely to the relevant substantive provisions or to the state's system of law as a whole, which would include its choice-of-law rules. Forums that do not have renvoi provisions refer only to the specific provisions of relevant law. In this way, the same outcome is achieved no matter where the case is litigated, as long as the second state would also have applied its own laws.

But if that second state has choice-of-law rules requiring it to apply the forum law, a difference in outcome might arise depending on where the plaintiff invokes jurisdiction. Whether a difference emerges depends on whether the other state operates a single renvoi system. A single-renvoi forum always refers to the other law's choice of law rules. If those rules would send the issue back to the forum court, the forum court will accept the first remission and applies its own laws. As a result, equality of outcome is always achieved if the competing laws operate different systems. Some early French authorities support this approach (e.g. Forgo's Case (1882) and Soulié's Case (1910)). Similarly, Article 27 of the Introductory Law of the German Civil Code (1900) adopts it. But if both sets of laws operate with either no renvoi system or single renvoi systems, forum shopping will be a potential problem.

Hence, there is another system called double renvoi or the foreign-courts doctrine, which will also ensure parity of result as long as no other relevant law is using it. In this scenario, the forum court considers that it is sitting as the foreign court and will decide the matter as the foreign court would. In this system, there can never be more than two remissions; e.g., English forum refers to French law (a single-renvoi system) so English law is applied (1st remission) and France accepts the remission (2nd and final). At present, only English law uses this approach.

== Application of renvoi ==
Because the doctrine is considered difficult and its results are sometimes unpredictable, application of renvoi has generally been limited to:

- the validity of wills and intestate succession (the validity of transfers of real property); and
- retrospective legitimation by the marriage of the natural parents (validity of divorce decrees).

However, there are indications in some states that it might also apply to two issues in family law: the capacity to marry and the formal validity of marriage.

=== EU ===
In the European Union, application of renvoi is expressly excluded in contract cases under article 20 of the Rome I Regulation (regulation (EC) 593/2008l formerly in Article 15 EC Convention on the Law Applicable to Contractual Obligations, Rome 1980). It has also been rejected for contracts by most Commonwealth countries.

Most states also exclude it in tort cases e.g. in the UK section 9(5) of the Private International Law (Miscellaneous Provisions) Act 1995. Since 11 January 2009, Regulation (EC) 864/2007 (the Rome II Regulation) on the law applicable to non-contractual obligations has been in force, controlling in a uniform way the rules throughout the European Union. Article 24 of this regulation provides: "The application of the law of any country specified by this Regulation means the application of the rules of law in force in that country other than its rules of private international law." hence excluding the possibility of renvoi throughout the EU in tort cases.

=== Australia ===
In Australia, the doctrine of renvoi was revived by the decision of the High Court in Neilson v Overseas Projects Corporation of Victoria Ltd [2005] HCA 54 (29 September 2005). In this decision the High Court considered the situation of Mrs Neilson, who had injured herself falling down the stairs in her apartment in Wuhan, China. Her apartment had been provided by her husband's employer, Overseas Projects Corporation, and Mrs Neilson sued her husband's employer in negligence in the Supreme Court of Western Australia in June 1997, six years after the accident had occurred. Under Australian choice of law rules, the law of the place of the incident or lex loci delicti governs tort situations (following the decision of that court in 2002: Regie Nationale des Usines Renault SA v Zhang). This meant that the law relevant to the resolution of the dispute was that of the People's Republic of China. However under Chinese law, the claim would have been statute barred for exceeding the limitations period (Article 136 of the General Principles of Civil Law of the People's Republic of China). However Mrs Neilson raised Article 146 of the General Principles in her defence, arguing that the provision of that article should apply making the relevant law for the dispute Australian law. Article 146 provided that:

"With regard to compensation for damages resulting from an infringement of rights, the law of the place in which the infringement occurred shall be applied. If both parties are nationals of the same country or domiciled in the same country, the law of their own country or of their place of domicile may also be applied"

As a consequence, the Supreme Court trial judge concluded that Art 146 "gives me a right to choose to apply the law of Australia because both parties are nationals of Australia." This decision was reversed by the Full Court of the Supreme Court of Western Australia.

On appeal to the High Court, Neilson succeeded. In six separate judgments, the majority of the High Court found in favour of Neilson on the basis that the Australian choice of law rule referred to the whole of the law of the place of the wrong. Secondly, that this meant that the applicable law was referred back to Australia and the Australian limitations statute applied, meaning that Neilson's claim was no longer statute barred.

This decision has received strident criticism by Martin Davies, and both the High Court and Full Court decisions have received very close attention by leading contemporary conflicts scholars including Andrew Lu and Lee Carroll, Elizabeth Crawford, and Mary Keyes.

It has been suggested that this messy interpretation of the Australian Court could have been avoided, had the Court followed the general practice that procedural rules always go with the forum and substantive law depends on the "forum most interested" analysis. However, since John Pfeiffer Pty Ltd v Rogerson (2000) 203 CLR 503, statutes of limitations are considered substantive law. Because of this, the applicability of limitation laws no longer go with the local forum; rather, they too follow the lex loci delicti.

=== United States ===
In the United States most courts try to solve conflict of laws questions without invoking renvoi. In Re Schneider's Estate, 96 N.Y.S.2d 652 (1950), is an example where renvoi is recognized as an option, in which the local court chose to apply the foreign country's laws to decide the dispute in the local court. This is most likely to happen in cases involving immovable property or domestic relationships.

== The main difficulties ==
There are three main difficulties in cases where renvoi may be an issue:

1. It gives undue weight to the evidence of the experts on foreign laws.
2. The reference to the conflicts system used in other laws may reveal differences that would have arisen in characterisation or in the choice of law rules to be applied. If these differences would lead to onward transmissions, the forum court will follow the references into third (or further) legal systems. This is unpopular because it requires the parties and the court to consider evidence of multiple legal systems.
3. There may be an "inextricable circle" between sets of laws using either single or double renvoi systems which do not have adequate safeguards built in to guarantee when to stop accepting remissions.

== Sources ==
- Roosevelt, Kermit III (May 1, 2005). "Resolving Renvoi: The Bewitchment of Our Intelligence by Means of Language". Notre Dame Law Review. 80 (5). Notre Dame, Indiana: Notre Dame Law School: 1821–1891. ISSN 0745-3515. OCLC 209129333.
