= Dépeçage =

Parsing of issues to be ruled by various jurisdictions

In law, dépeçage (from the French, meaning "dismemberment") is a concept within the field of conflict of laws whereby different issues within a single case are governed by the laws of different jurisdictions. In common law countries, dépeçage can be used when a single contract provides that different parts of the contract shall be governed by different laws, or in the absence of a contract when a court's own rules on choice of law cause it to apply different bodies of law to different questions.

The concept originated in civil law countries, but has also been adopted in common law countries such as the United Kingdom and Ireland pursuant to the Rome Convention on the law applicable to contractual obligations (Article 3(1)).

In practice, it is relatively rare for a contract to have more than one expressly chosen governing law. Two examples of such situations are:

- In derivatives transactions governed by International Swaps and Derivatives Association (ISDA) standard documentation, it is common for the ISDA Master Agreement to be governed by the laws of New York state, and for the Credit Support Annexe to be governed by English law. This is because the provisions of English law relating to title transfer under the Credit Support Annexe are thought to be more favourable to the secured party than New York law under the equivalent Credit Support Annexe published by ISDA. In reality however, although the Annex is described as forming part of the same agreement as the Master Agreement, physically as well as conceptually, they are really two separate documents.
- In ship financing transactions, it is quite common for a statutory ship mortgage to be taken over the vessel which will be governed by the laws of the state in which the ship is registered (which will often be an Offshore Financial Centre or jurisdiction which provides for flags of convenience), however, such mortgages are usually supplemented by a separate deed of covenants, and these will normally be governed by the law which governs the primary financial documentation.
