= Drug Trafficking Vessel Interdiction Act =

2008 US Act of Congress

- Long title: An Act to amend titles 46 and 18, United States Code, with respect to the operation of submersible vessels and semi-submersible vessels without nationality.
- Acronyms (colloquial): DTVIA
- Nicknames: Drug Trafficking Vessel Interdiction Act of 2008
- Enacted by: the 110th United States Congress
- Effective: October 13, 2008

Citations
- Public law: 110-407
- Statutes at Large: 122 Stat. 4296

Codification
- Titles amended: 18 U.S.C.: Crimes and Criminal Procedure; 46 U.S.C.: Shipping
- U.S.C. sections amended: 18 U.S.C. ch. 111 §§ 2271, 2285; 46 U.S.C. ch. 705 § 70501 et seq.

Legislative history
- Introduced in the Senate as S. 3598 by Daniel Inouye (D-HI) on September 25, 2008; Committee consideration by House Judiciary, House Transportation and Infrastructure; Passed the Senate on September 25, 2008 (Passed unanimous consent); Passed the House on September 29, 2008 (Passed voice vote); Signed into law by President George W. Bush on October 13, 2008

The Drug Trafficking Vessel Interdiction Act of 2008, Pub. L. 110–407 (text) (PDF), 122 Stat. 4296, enacted October 23, 2008, was an act of the United States Congress outlawing operation of or travel in unregistered submersibles and semi-submersibles in international waters with the intent to evade detection.

The act was enacted to combat the use of illicit self-propelled semi-submersible and submersible vessels in international drug trafficking (see narco-submarine). Notably, the act provides for extraterritorial jurisdiction. The law extended earlier legislation such as the Marijuana on the High Seas Act (MHSA) and Maritime Drug Law Enforcement Act (MDLEA).
