= Conflict of marriage laws =

Conflict of laws with respect to marriage in different jurisdictions

Conflict of marriage laws is the conflict of laws with respect to marriage in different jurisdictions. When marriage-related issues arise between couples with diverse backgrounds, questions as to which legal systems and norms should be applied to the relationship naturally follow with various potentially applicable systems frequently conflicting with one another.

== The choice of law ==
The standard choice of law rules for adjudicating on issues relating to marriage represent a balance between the various public policies of the laws involved:

=== Status and capacity ===
Status and capacity are defined by the personal laws of the parties, namely:

- the lex domicilii or law of the domicile in common law states, and
- either the lex patriae or law of nationality, or law of habitual residence in civil law states).

The personal laws will usually define status in rem so that it is recognised wherever the individual may travel subject only to significant public policy limits. Hence, for example, as an aspect of parens patriae, a state will define the age at which a person may marry. If such a limitation could simply be evaded by the young person traveling abroad on a holiday to a country with a lower age limit, this would clearly breach the policy of the "parental" state. The same principle would apply to an adult who wished to create a polygamous marriage or to evade a restriction on consanguinity. In Family Law as opposed to the Law of Contract, there is also a strong case for legal capacity to be universally enforced to limit to ability of individuals to evade normally mandatory rules. The claims of the lex loci celebrationis to apply are weak given that the significance of the location may be no more than the convenience of their laws to those wishing to marry.

=== Validity of the marriage ===
1. The form of the marriage is governed by the lex loci celebrationis or the law of the place where the marriage was celebrated or occurred, and is usually considered definitive on whether the ceremony or legal recognition has been effective to create the relationship of marriage and marital rights (see nullity).
2. The validity of the marriage is governed by the capacity of the parties to marry each other. Capacity to become a spouse is usually governed by the domicile of the parties. Thus for example, a 13-year-old does not have the capacity to marry in England, but does have that capacity in Nigeria (Northern Muslim Community). Likewise, in Canada no person can be "sanctioned" to have multiple spouses.

=== Lex fori ===
The lex fori, or proper jurisdiction to adjudicate legal disputes, will usually be the state where the spouses have sought to make their matrimonial home. This state will usually have a clear and direct interest in the applications of its policies to regulate the nature of relationships permitted to confer the status of husband and wife within their territorial boundaries. It may also attempt to regulate the behavior of those who wish to cohabit within their territory although this may contravene privacy rights.

=== Custom ===
In many states, culturally separate communities have retained their own traditions. A developing modern state had to determine whether it should recognize such traditions as it was establishing a centralized system of law. In South Africa, for example, the Recognition of Customary Marriages Act, 1998 retrospectively recognizes as valid all customary marriages so long as they are registered. Further, s2(3) of the Act provides that, if a person has entered into more than one customary law marriage, all valid marriages entered into before the commencement of the Act, are recognized. The Act similarly recognizes all customary marriages entered into after the commencement of the Act where the High Court approves a written contract regulating the future matrimonial property systems for marriages (both present and prospective spouses must be joined in the application). Such measure represented a major shift, because custom marriages were often potentially or actually polygamous as against public policy, and were not recognized under the new law.

Where a state has produced a formal body of law to control recognition, this will establish a general framework under which international recognition can be managed. Where there is no formal rule within the lex loci celebrationis, a forum court could hear expert evidence on whether the marriage would be accepted as effective (see the public policy of favor matrimonii which creates a rebuttable presumption in favor of the validity of any marriage) but it will be difficult for the parties to justify their failure to comply with the local laws that unambiguously would have created a valid marriage.

=== Common law ===
In some states, the legal acceptability of common law marriage is very limited. Some couples, whether because there are no local formalities relevant to them or because they have strongly held prejudices against compliance with the local forms, decide to create a marriage either by a simple public exchange of vows (per verbis inter praesentes), or by habit and repute. Because the need for conformity between states requires respect for the legal systems, it is now very difficult to identify states with no local system for the celebration and registration of marriages, and even more difficult for the courts of one state to justify a decision to support the prejudices of two of its citizens against the laws of the second state. However, other states permit informal marriages to acquire legal status and, where this happens, there is no reason in principle why international recognition should not follow.

=== Government registration ===
In some countries, the registration of a marriage means that it cannot later be declared invalid, since it has been accepted by the government. In Taiwan, which follows a variation of the Napoleonic Code (received by way of Japan), the presumption is that each country maintains a central registry of its citizens, including their marital status. If a Taiwan citizen marries in another country, however, this information may not find its way into the records. Many thousands of ROC soldiers who came to Taiwan in 1949 left behind wives in mainland China, but married local Taiwanese women. Since the two polities did not share records, the result was a pattern of legally recognized second marriages, despite the ban on polygamy by both sides of the Taiwan Strait. Today, foreigners wishing to marry Taiwan citizens must present letters from their countries' representative offices testifying that they are not already married. (Of course a determined bigamist might marry in some third country.) In the case of countries which lack centralized family records (such as the USA), a notarized affidavit is accepted.

== The age of marriage ==
Different minimum age requirements also can lead to problems in mutual recognition of marriages. A marriage of young children is in some countries deemed to be against the public order, minimum ages for recognition are sometimes set (which may vary from the minimum ages for marriage itself). For example, in the United Kingdom, the Immigration Rules 1986 were introduced to bar persons under the age of 16 from entering the UK in reliance upon their status as a spouse. Nevertheless, for other purposes, such marriages will be recognized as valid so long as the parties had the relevant capacity under their personal laws and the ceremony was effective under the lex loci celebrationis to create a valid marriage.

== Consent ==
In Western cultures, other than the age of consent, the issue of consent is also considered of fundamental importance and, if it is not freely given, it can prevent a valid marriage from ever coming into existence: see nullity. In Islamic law, a nikah contract is not valid if the parties do not consent, although there are differences in juristic opinion about exactly how the consent can be manifested. This supposed lack of clarity has led some Western cultures to question the general morality of "arranged marriages", often stigmatizing the system as being open to abuse and sometimes leading to forced marriages. In the English case of Szechter v Szechter, Sir Jocelyn Simon P. said that for duress to vitiate a valid marriage, it must be proved that:

- the will of one of the parties had been overborne by a genuine and reasonably held fear;
- this fear was caused by a threat of immediate danger for which the party was not himself or herself responsible, usually amounting to a threat of physical or fatal injury, or false imprisonment.

The test requiring an immediate danger never matched the practical realities facing individuals where the consequences of a refusal to marry might not be immediate, but nevertheless serious. In Hirani v Hirani (1982) 4 FLR 332, the Court of Appeal considered the case of a nineteen-year-old Hindu woman who was dating a Muslim man. Her parents told the petitioner that unless she married a Hindu of their choosing, she would be ostracized socially from her family and left to fend for herself. Under the circumstances, the Court agreed that the petitioner had acted without full consent in marrying her parents' choice of husband. Thus, it is for the courts of all countries to strike a balance between well-intentioned parental authority to arrange marriages in the face of a reluctant child, and unreasonable threats that would overbear the will of any reasonable person, while maintaining the trust of local communities whose cultures have included arranged marriages for centuries. As to transnational recognition, it will be difficult to disturb the validity of the marriage if no complaint of coercion was made around the time the ceremony was performed in the lex loci celebrationis or immediately the parties entered the state where proceedings were commenced. It would be more usual to use the local divorce system to terminate the relationship.

== Consanguinity ==
In Christian cultures, the Biblical proscriptions contained in Leviticus 18:6–18 are used as the basis for restricting marriage between persons who are deemed to be too closely related to each other. More generally, the restrictions fall into two classes (and based on Old Testament laws):

- where the parties are related by blood (consanguinity); or
- where parties are related by marriage (affinity).

Several exceptions have been described for various Biblical figures, incestuous relationships such as Abraham and Sarah, Nachor and Melcha, Lot and his Daughters, and Amram and Jochebed.

The limitations based on consanguinity derive from a policy of practical eugenics and reflect the increased possibility that such marriages will produce children with a genetic defect due to the limitations on their combined gene pool. The limitations based on affinity, by contrast, are predominantly legal and social in origin. The rules relating to affinity reflect the need to minimise the prospects of familial jealousies and dysfunction by preventing the intermarriage of people already related by marriage. Difficult questions arise on whether an adopted child may marry his or her adoptive parents, or the natural children of the adoptive parents. No matter what legislative decisions are taken, there will always be citizens who wish to evade the application of the law. There will be no problem if they relocate and establish a matrimonial home in a state that allows their marriage. But any attempt to evade such laws by going through a ceremony in a state that permits the marriage and then returning to the original state (which will usually be their state of domicile, nationality or habitual residence) will fail, and may even expose the couple to the risk of prosecution for incest or an equivalent offense.

== Polygamy ==
Polygamy may be polygyny (one man having more than one wife at the same time) or polyandry (one woman having more than one husband at the same time) and it has been practiced sparsely throughout history in almost all cultures and sanctioned by various religions where it was considered necessary to meet population or economic needs. In some economically poor areas where infant mortality is high but children are a vital source of labor to maintain the earning capacity of the family, polygamy may provide more children. States which prohibit polygamous marriages under national law often also criminalize bigamy. Some countries, such as Canada, have made polygamy an offense under the Criminal Code. Under section 293(a) of the Canadian Criminal Code, everyone who enters into any form of polygamy or any "conjugal union with more than one person at a time" is guilty of an offense, and under s. 293(b), there is a separate offense for any person who "celebrates, assists or is a party to a rite that sanctions a polygamous marriage".

Other states refer to the current religious practices within their territories as the test for legal acceptability: for example, the Marriage Law 1974 (no. 1/74) in Indonesia does not prohibit polygamy for those religions that allow it (i.e. Islam, Hinduism, Buddhism), but permits it with the consent of the existing wife or wives if:

- there is proof of sufficient financial capacity to maintain all spouses and children;
- there are safeguards that husband will treat his wives and children equally; and
- a court is satisfied that there are valid reasons for wishing to contract a polygamous marriage (e.g., that the existing wife is infertile, has an incurable disease, etc.).

The converse is to be found in the halakhah and the Talmud where the general principle is that, "a woman cannot be the wife of two [men]" (Kid. 7a and Rashi). For a wife, the term kiddushin implies her exclusive dedication to her husband and there can be no kiddushin between her and another man while the first kiddushin subsists. Any purported marriage to another man is thus formally invalid but, nevertheless, requires a get to terminate it. A married man may celebrate a second marriage (and any others) unless he has specifically undertaken to his first wife, e.g., in the ketubbah, not to do so, or monogamy is the local custom. Thus, Ashkenazic Jews who live in Christian nations accepted a takkanah (a rabbinic law not deriving from the Talmud) banning polygamy in c. 1000 CE, while Sephardic Jews who live in Islamic societies have not followed this law.

The vast majority of Muslim majority sovereign states recognize polygamous marriages: these states span from West Africa to Southeast Asia, with the exceptions of Turkey, Tunisia, Albania, Kosovo and Central Asian countries.

In India, the Hindu Marriage Act, 1955 bans polygamous marriages, but polygamy is still legal for Muslims in India.

=== Actually polygamous ===
At the time a secular court considers the validity of this marriage, there are already multiple spouses. In English law, for example, §2 Immigration Act 1988 prohibits certain polygamous wives from exercising their right of abode with the result that any application from such a wife has to be considered in accordance with paragraphs 278 to 280 of the Immigration Rules, which contain provisions to restrict settlement in most cases to one wife. But, for less controversial purposes, most states are willing to recognise actually polygamous marriages as valid so long as the parties had the capacity to enter into such relationships and the ceremonies were effective under the lex loci celebrationis.

== Same-sex marriage ==
In a Chinese conception of marriage, a marriage is defined as being a relationship in which unions of various surnames are established in order to increase the lines of succession and property values.

The first law providing for marriage of people of the same sex in modern times was enacted in 2001 in the Netherlands. As of 2025, same-sex marriage is legally recognized in the following countries: Andorra, Argentina, Australia, (Note: Same-sex marriage is performed and recognized by law in continental Australia and in the non-self-governing possessions of Norfolk Island, Christmas Island and the Cocos Islands, which follow Australian law.) Austria, Belgium, Brazil, Canada, Chile, Colombia, Costa Rica, Cuba, Denmark, (Note: Same-sex marriage is performed and recognized by law in continental Denmark, the Faroe Islands and Greenland, which together make up the Realm of Denmark.) Ecuador, (Note: Same-sex marriage is performed and recognized throughout Ecuador, but such couples are not considered married for purposes of adoption and may not adopt children.) Estonia, Finland, France, (Note: Same-sex marriage is performed and recognized by law in metropolitan France and in all French overseas regions and possessions, which follow a single legal code.) Germany, Greece, Iceland, Ireland, Liechtenstein, Luxembourg, Malta, Mexico, (Note: Same-sex marriage is available in all jurisdictions, though the process is not everywhere as straightforward as it is for opposite-sex marriage and does not always include adoption rights.) the Netherlands, (Note: Same-sex marriage is performed and recognized by law in the continental Netherlands, the Caribbean municipalities of Bonaire, Sint Eustatius and Saba, and the constituent countries of Aruba and Curaçao, but not yet in Sint Maarten.) New Zealand, (Note: Same-sex marriage is performed and recognized by law in New Zealand proper, but not in its possession of Tokelau, nor in the Cook Islands and Niue, which make up the Realm of New Zealand.) Norway, Portugal, Slovenia, South Africa, Spain, Sweden, Switzerland, Taiwan, Thailand, the United Kingdom, (Note: Same-sex marriage is performed and recognized by law in all parts of the United Kingdom and in its non-American possessions, but not in its American possessions, namely Anguilla, Bermuda, the British Virgin Islands, the Cayman Islands, Montserrat and the Turks and Caicos Islands.) the United States, (Note: Same-sex marriage is performed and recognized by law in all fifty states of the US and in the District of Columbia, in all overseas territories except American Samoa (recognition only), and in all tribal nations that do not have their own marriage laws, as well as in most nations that do. The largest of the dozen or so tribal nations that do not perform or recognize same-sex marriage are Navajo, Gila River and perhaps Yakama, and the largest (or perhaps only) among the shared-sovereignty Oklahoma Tribal Statistical Areas are the Creek, Citizen Potawatomi and Seminole. These polities ban same-sex marriage and do not recognize marriages from other jurisdictions, though members may still marry under state law and be accorded all the rights of marriage under state and federal law.) and Uruguay. Polls show rising support for legally recognizing same-sex marriage in most of the Americas and Europe. Israel recognizes same-sex marriages abroad but does not allow same-sex marriages to be performed within its borders. In several countries worldwide a same-sex couple can be legally partnered in a civil union, domestic partnership or registered partnership. Couples in these unions or partnerships are afforded rights and obligations similar to, but not identical to, those of a married couple.

On the issue of transsexualism, the European Court of Human Rights in Goodwin v UK and I v UK (July 2002) concluded that there is no justification for barring a transsexual from enjoying the right to marry. In Bellinger v Bellinger [2003] UKHL 21, (2003) Times, 11 April the English courts held that the non-recognition of change of gender for the purposes of marriage in s 11(c) of the Matrimonial Causes Act 1973 was incompatible with Convention rights. But the House of Lords did not consider that the issues raised in the case were suitable for determination by courts and left the matter for Parliament, which has now enacted the Gender Recognition Act 2004 and matches the majority of European states in permitting marriage in the adoptive gender role. The same rights may be allowed in Australia, Canada, and some other states.

== See also ==
- Family Law Act (Alberta, Canada)
- International child abduction
