= Rome II Regulation =

The Rome II Regulation (EC) No 864/2007 is a European Union Regulation regarding the conflict of laws on the law applicable to non-contractual obligations. From 11 January 2009, the Rome II Regulation created a harmonised set of rules within the European Union to govern choice of law in civil and commercial matters (subject to certain exclusions, such as the application being manifestly incompatible with the public policy of the forum) concerning non-contractual obligations. Additionally, in certain circumstances and subject to certain conditions, the parties may choose the law applicable to a non-contractual obligation. Analogous rules were established for contractual obligations by the Rome Convention of 1980. The Rome Convention has, in turn, been replaced by the Rome I Regulation on the law applicable to contractual obligations (Reg. (EC) No. 593/2008). The regulation applies to all EU member states except Denmark.

== Background ==
Initially submitted by the European Commission in July 2003, an amended text was finally adopted on 11 July 2007 and published in the Official Journal on 31 July 2007. It applies to events arising since 11 January 2009. It may apply to obligations arising from events giving rise to damage occurring from an earlier date, 20 August 2007, although the text of the Regulation is unfortunately silent on this point.

== Contents ==
The regulation includes specific rules for tort/delict (harm caused by failure to perform a duty) and specific categories of tort/delict, unjust enrichment, negotiorum gestio (acting as an agent without permission) and culpa in contrahendo (misleading negotiation of a contract).

== Exclusion of defamation and privacy cases ==
Because of the difficulty in reaching a consensus on defamation and privacy cases, the regulation excludes these issues, instead directing the Commission to draw up a new regulation by the end of 2008. A similar directive was issued in 2012. A 2023 law, modeled on the anti-SLAPP laws of many American states, protects journalists from harassing lawsuits filed by people they have criticized.

== United Kingdom ==
While the United Kingdom was a member state of the EU, the Rome II Regulation was directly applicable to all issues in scope. The Law Applicable to Non-Contractual Obligations (England and Wales and Northern Ireland) Regulations 2008 disapplied the existing choice of law provisions in private international law in relation to all issues relating to tort which were covered by Rome II.

As of September 2022, following Brexit, the regulation is retained EU law within the UK, subject to minor amendments.

== See also ==
- Rome I Regulation (Applicable law in contractual obligations)
- Rome III Regulation (Applicable law in divorce cases)
- Tort (conflict)
- Brussels Regime, governing jurisdiction
