= Intercontainer-Interfrigo =

European logistics service provider

Intercontainer-Interfrigo SA (ICF) was an internationally active logistics service provider. The company had its operational headquarters in Basel and its legal headquarters in Brussels. Intercontainer specialized in intermodal container based transport. Intercontainer was created by the principal national railway companies of Europe, and these continued to be its principal shareholders, as well as being principal suppliers of traction and network access to the European national rail networks.

During the middle of the first decade of the twenty-first century the business underwent a strategic rationalization. Concentration focused more than before on linking the dynamic landlocked economies of central western Europe, notably Switzerland and Austria, with major European north-western seaports of Antwerp, Rotterdam, Bremerhaven und Hamburg, as well as the longer inland freight routes within eastern and south-eastern Europe and container freight to the CIS. The business was supported by a company fleet of approximately 2,300 rail wagons. In Switzerland the enterprise was registered as a railway company, with its principal activity given as "Operateur Kombiverkehr" (Operator of Combined (intermodal) transport).

In 2007 Intercontainer-Interfrigo SA employed approximately 100 staff, and achieved a turnover of €140 Million, with a traffic volume equivalent to 415,800 Standard TEU (unit)s. By this time the volume was split between transport to and from sea ports, and transport between land-locked logistics centres, approximately in the ratio 50:50.

== History ==
Intercontainer was established, originally, as a not for profit cooperative partnership between principal European rail companies, in 1967. In 1993 the business acquired and operations were pushed together with those of another not for profit cooperative partnership called Interfrigo which had been founded in 1949 and specialised in timely refrigerated rail transport of high volume goods, notably bananas carried from the port of Rotterdam to principal European markets such as Germany and Switzerland. The resulting combination now became known as Intercontainer-Interfrigo. In 2003 the company was converted into an "Aktiengesellschaft" (a form of Joint-stock company) as defined under Belgian law.

On 26 November 2010 the owners placed the business in liquidation with the stated intention of minimizing disruption to customers by transferring operation of the company's 145 or so weekly trains to the rail companies themselves.
