= Family Law Act (Alberta) =

Law in Alberta, Canada

The Family Law Act came into force in the Canadian province of Alberta on October 1, 2005. It replaced the Domestic Relations Act, the Maintenance Order Act, the Parentage and Maintenance Act, and parts of the Provincial Court Act and the Child, Youth and Family Enhancement Act in that province.

While the federal Divorce Act governs issues arising on divorce in the province of Alberta, matrimonial proceedings other than divorce are governed by the Family Law Act which owes its origins to a major research project that was undertaken by the Alberta Law Reform Institute.

== See also ==
- Family Law Act (Ontario)
