= Parens patriae =

Power of the state to protect a child

In law, parens patriae is the public policy power of the state to intervene against an abusive or negligent parent, legal guardian, or informal caretaker, and to act as the parent of any child, individual or animal who is in need of protection. For example, some children, incapacitated individuals, and disabled individuals lack parents who are able and willing to render adequate care, thus requiring state intervention.

In U.S. litigation, parens patriae can be invoked by the state to create its standing to sue; the state declares itself to be suing on behalf of its people. For example, the Hart-Scott-Rodino Antitrust Improvement Act of 1976 (15 USC 15c), through Section 4C of the Clayton Act, permits state attorneys general to bring parens patriae suits on behalf of those injured by violations of the Sherman Antitrust Act.

== Discussion ==
Parens patriae relates to a notion initially invoked by the King's Bench in the 16th century in cases of non compos mentis adults. The notion dates from at least 1608, as recorded in Coke's report of Calvin's Case, wherein it is said that "moral law, honora patrem… doubtless doth extend to him that is pater patriae".

The parens patrae doctrine was gradually applied to children throughout the 17th and 18th centuries, and has since evolved from one granting absolute rights to the sovereign to one more associated with rights and obligations of the state and courts towards children and incapacitated adults.

== In US federal courts ==
The concept of the parens patriae suit has been greatly expanded in the United States federal courts beyond those that existed in England.

In Louisiana v. Texas, the State of Louisiana brought suit to enjoin officials of the State of Texas from so administering the Texas quarantine regulations as to prevent Louisiana merchants from sending goods into Texas. The US Supreme Court recognized that Louisiana was attempting to sue, not because of any particular injury to a particular business of the state, but as parens patriae for all its citizens.

The Supreme Court recognized a different kind of parens patriae suit in Georgia v. Pennsylvania R. Co.

Then, three decades later, in Hawaii v. Standard Oil Co., the court considered a generally similar damages action Hawaii brought under the antitrust laws for damages to its general economy resulting from a price fix by four oil companies. The court held that the state could sue as parens patriae only for injunctive relief and not for damages. Its citizens would have to sue individually for damages.

In Massachusetts v. EPA, a group of states (mostly coastal states) sought to sue the EPA to require it to regulate greenhouse gas emissions because they were causing global warming and rising sea levels. "These rising seas have already begun to swallow Massachusetts' coastal land." The court stated:

In sum—at least according to petitioners' uncontested affidavits—the rise in sea levels associated with global warming has already harmed and will continue to harm Massachusetts. The risk of catastrophic harm, though remote, is nevertheless real. That risk would be reduced to some extent if petitioners received the relief they seek.

Therefore, states such as Massachusetts had standing as parens patriae to sue EPA to seeks to require it to regulate to protect their coastlines. The Court held that EPA would have to consider the matter and give a reasoned explanation of whatever its decision on the merits would be.

In Pennsylvania v. Mid-Atlantic Toyota Distributors, Inc., the Fourth Circuit held that several state attorney generals were proper parens patriae plaintiffs to sue a group of car dealers for price fixing, in order to recover damages for their citizen injured by overcharges. The court held that because plaintiffs were authorized to pursue antitrust litigation against defendants on behalf of their states' natural-person residents under both 15 U.S.C. §§ 15c–15h and state laws and constitutions, they could sue on behalf of their citizens.

The relation of parens patriae suits brought under state law to the federal Class Action Fairness Act is an unclear issue with implications related to American federalism.

The United States Supreme Court ruled in Haaland v. Brackeen that states do not have the authority to sue the federal government under parens patriae.

== Animals ==
The Supreme Court of India invoked the doctrine of parens patriae in Animal Welfare Board Of India vs A. Nagaraja & Ors. The court observed that "PCA Act (Prevention of Cruelty to Animals Act), is a welfare legislation which has to be construed bearing in mind the purpose and object of the Act and the Directive Principles of State Policy. It is trite law that, in the matters of welfare legislation, the provisions of law should be liberally construed in favour of the weak and infirm. Court also should be vigilant to see that benefits conferred by such remedial and welfare legislation are not defeated by subtle devices. Court has also a duty under the doctrine of parens patriae to take care of the rights of animals, since they are unable to take care of themselves as against human beings."

== See also ==
- Child custody
- in loco parentis
- Joint custody
- Qui tam
- Pater Patriae
- Private attorney general
