= Dicey Morris & Collins =

English law textbook

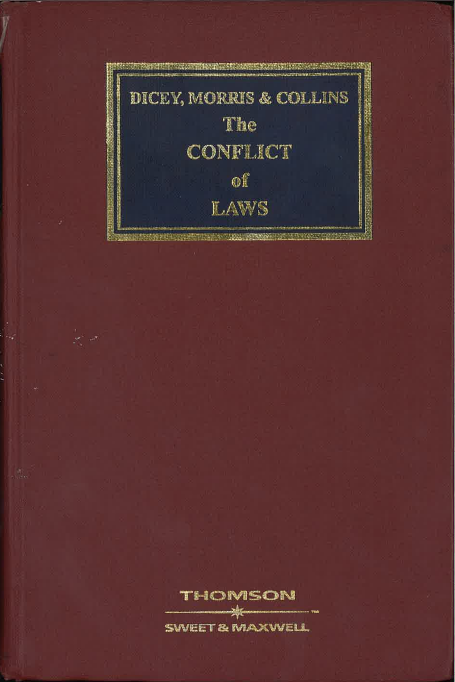
Dicey, Morris & Collins, 14th edition.

Dicey, Morris & Collins on the Conflict of Laws (often simply Dicey, Morris & Collins, or even just Dicey & Morris) is the leading English law textbook on the conflict of laws (ISBN 978-0-414-02453-3). It has been described as the "gold standard" in terms of academic writing on the subject, and the "foremost authority on private international law".

== Editors ==
The textbook has had three principal general editors during its life:

- A. V. Dicey, the constitutional scholar and Vinerian Professor of English Law.
- John H. C. Morris
- Lord Collins of Mapesbury, solicitor and later judge.

Since 2015, Professor Jonathan Harris KC has been joint general editor with Lord Collins of Mapesbury.

Between 1922 and 1949 A. Berriedale Keith was also a general editor of the text, but has not been honoured with a permanent place in the book's title.

In the most recent edition, the team of editors includes Professor C G J Morse, Professor David McClean, Professor Adrian Briggs, Professor Jonathan Harris, Professor Campbell McLachlan KC, Professor Andrew Dickinson and Professor Peter McEleavy.

== Editions ==
The first edition was published in 1896 under the title A Digest of the Law of England with reference to the Conflict of Laws. The 16th and most recent edition was published in 2022.

Dicey, Morris & Collins
Year	Edition	General Editors
1896	First Edition	A.V. Dicey
1908	Second Edition	A.V. Dicey
1922	Third Edition	A.V. Dicey and A. Berriedale Keith
1927	Fourth Edition	A. Berriedale Keith
1932	Fifth Edition	A. Berriedale Keith
1949	Sixth Edition	J.H.C. Morris
1958	Seventh Edition	J.H.C. Morris
1967	Eighth Edition	J.H.C. Morris
1973	Ninth Edition	J.H.C. Morris
1980	Tenth Edition	J.H.C. Morris
1987	Eleventh Edition	Lawrence Collins
1992	(Second Impression)	Lawrence Collins
1993	Twelfth Edition	Lawrence Collins
1994	(Second Impression)	Lawrence Collins
2000	Thirteenth Edition	Lawrence Collins
2006	Fourteenth Edition	Sir Lawrence Collins
2012	Fifteenth Edition	Lord Collins of Mapesbury
2022	Sixteenth Edition	Lord Collins of Mapesbury and Professor Jonathan Harris

== Format ==
Unusually for an academic textbook, Dicey, Morris & Collins is set out in a series of "Rules". The format dates from the time when there was relatively little case law or statute law on the subject, and A.V. Dicey tried to formulate the text from first principles. The format became something of a self-fulfilling prophecy as during the evolution of the subject judges would often cite rules in the textbook as authoritative propositions for their rulings (see for example, Singularis Holdings Limited v PricewaterhouseCoopers [2014] UKPC 36 at paragraph 12).
