= Public policy doctrine =

Body of principles that underpin the operation of legal systems

In private international law, the public policy doctrine or ordre public (French: lit. "public order") concerns the body of principles that underpin the operation of legal systems in each state. This addresses the social, moral and economic values that tie a society together: values that vary in different cultures and change over time. Law regulates behaviour either to reinforce existing social expectations or to encourage constructive change, and laws are most likely to be effective when they are consistent with the most generally accepted societal norms and reflect the collective morality of the society.

In performing this function, Cappalli has suggested that the critical values of any legal system include impartiality, neutrality, certainty, equality, openness, flexibility, and growth. This assumes that a state's courts function as dispute resolution systems, which avoid the violence that often otherwise accompanies private resolution of disputes. That is, citizens have to be encouraged to use the court system to resolve their disputes. The more certain and predictable the outcome of a court action, the less incentive there is to go to court where a loss is probable. But certainty must be subject to the needs of individual justice, hence the development of equity.

A judge should always consider the underlying policies to determine whether a rule should be applied to a specific factual dispute. If laws are applied too strictly and mechanically, the law cannot keep pace with social innovation. Similarly, if there is an entirely new situation, a return to the policies forming the basic assumptions underpinning potentially relevant rules of law identifies the best guidelines for resolving the immediate dispute. Over time, these policies evolve, becoming more clearly defined and more deeply embedded in the legal system.

== Fundamental principles ==
=== Ignorance of the law is not an excuse ===
The fundamental policy in the operation of a legal system is that ignorantia juris non excusat (ignorance of the law is no excuse). It would completely undermine the enforcement of any law if the person potentially at fault was able to raise as a successful defence that he or she had not been aware of the particular law. For this reason, all the main legislatures publish their laws freely whether in hard copy or on the Internet, while others offer them for sale to the public at affordable prices. Because everyone is entitled to access the laws as they affect their personal lives, all adults are assumed responsible enough to research the law before they act. If they fail to do so, they can hardly complain if their acts prove unlawful, no matter how transient they may be within the jurisdiction. The only exception to this rule excuses those of reduced capacity, whether as infants or through mental illness (for example, see the principle of doli incapax which raises an irrebuttable presumption in criminal law that an infant is incapable of committing a crime).

=== Sanctity of life ===
Underpinning most social, moral and religious systems is the policy of sanctity of life (also culture of life). In English criminal law, for example, duress is not allowed as a defence to murder because no threat is supposed to overcome a person's moral aversion to taking the life of another. Lord Jauncy in R v Gotts [1992] 2 AC 412 stated:

The reason why duress has for so long been stated not to be available as a defence to a murder charge is that the law regards the sanctity of human life and the protection thereof as of paramount importance ... I can therefore see no justification in logic, morality or law in affording to an attempted murderer the defence which is withheld from a murderer.

In refusal of treatment and euthanasia, commission and omission by doctors and hospital authorities resulting in the death of patients has become of increasing significance as societies debate whether the duty to preserve life outweighs the right of the autonomous patient to choose death. More contentious are those situations in which the patient is unable to make the choice personally, e.g. because in a persistent vegetative state or en ventre sa mere, i.e. a child in the womb.

=== Doctrine of evasion ===
Similarly, in many branches of law, the doctrine of evasion prevents persons, both natural and artificial, from evading the application of obligations and liabilities already attaching to them. This represents a practical application of the policy that, as an outcome of the social contract, all persons owing allegiance to a state should be entitled to assume that everyone will receive fair and equal treatment before the law, i.e. there will be no favouritism or preferential treatment to any person by virtue of their rank or status within society. As such, this is an exception to the policy in the law of contract which usually allows the parties autonomy to enter into whatever agreement they want and which might otherwise be taken to permit the parties to exclude the normal operation of the law as between themselves (see the policy of freedom of contract).

=== Children ===
There are policies specific to all the main branches of law. Hence, one of the policies in family law is parens patriae, i.e. that the state is the default parent for all those children within its jurisdiction and that, if it is necessary to protect the interests of the child, the state will usurp the rights of the natural parents and assert its own rights as every child's legal guardian. Within the EU, the right of the child to be heard in any proceedings is a fundamental right provided in Article 24 Charter of Fundamental Rights of the European Union. The views of the child shall be considered on matters which concern him or her in accordance with age and maturity. It also provides that the child's best interest shall be the primary consideration in all actions relating to children, whether taken by public authorities or private institutions.

=== Marriage ===
A policy which overlaps between family law and contract law is favor matrimonii which requires that any marriage entered into with a genuine commitment should be held valid unless there is some good reason to the contrary, matching contract law, where the preference is always to give effect to the genuine expectation of the parties.

== Discussion ==
The policies adopted by states have come into being for several reasons. Some are aspects of the concept of sovereignty and reflect the essence of territoriality. Thus, public laws which either define the constitution of the state or regulate its powers can only apply within the boundaries agreed as a part of the process of de jure recognition of statehood by the international community. Other policies are aspects of the social contract, and they define and regulate the relationship between a state and those citizens who owe it allegiance. To that extent, these policies interact with (and sometimes overlap) civil rights and human rights. A number of these rights are defined at a supranational level and it will be necessary for states to consider the extent to which international principles of law are to be allowed to influence the operation of law within their territories. Independently of the work of the international community to produce harmonised principles, the courts in one state may sometimes be faced with lawsuits which either seek to evade the operation of foreign laws through forum shopping or seek the enforcement of "foreign" laws. This is becoming increasingly common as people now move with reasonable freedom between states and international trade routinely services markets in different states. Such lawsuits will not be troublesome if the "foreign" law is the same as the forum law. But serious difficulties will arise if the application of the "foreign" law would produce a different result. These issues are resolved under the systems of law known as "conflict of laws".

In conflict cases, no court will apply a "foreign" law if the result of its application would be contrary to public policy. This is problematic because excluding the application of foreign laws would defeat the purpose of conflict of laws by giving automatic preference to the forum court's domestic law. Thus, for the most part, courts are slower to invoke public policy in cases involving a foreign element than when a domestic legal issue is involved. That said, in those countries that have adopted treaty obligations involving human rights (e.g. the states who submit to jurisdiction of the European Court of Human Rights) broader concepts of public policy may now apply. Thus, courts may have to consider the "justice" implicit in a law that allows a husband to divorce his wife, but not vice versa, as an aspect of sexual discrimination. Similarly, it would be possible to question the propriety of polygamous marriages, the talaq system of divorce which is available in some Islamic states, and Jewish divorce known as the get, but it is likely that the courts would be cautious to avoid any implication that they were discriminating against religions. Equally difficult are the family laws which regulate incestuous relationships and capacity. For example, it is probable that one state should not be too quick to condemn another because it allows a marriage between an uncle and a niece, or allows a marriage with a girl of 13 (e.g. as in Northern Nigeria), particularly if the parties are not proposing residence in the forum state.

Less controversial is the exclusion of foreign laws that are penal or territorial because they seek to collect taxes due to another state, e.g. in English law, if foreign exchange control legislation is used as "an instrument of oppression", it may be denied extraterritorial enforcement (Re Helbert Wagg & Co Ltd [1956] Ch 323, 351). Similarly, otherwise valid contracts may be denied enforcement if to do so would assist an enemy of the forum state or would damage the political relationship with a friendly state. When considering questions of status, English courts have held that incapacities imposed on account of slavery (Somersett's Case [1771] 20 St Tr 1), religion (Re Metcalfe's Trusts [1864] 2 De G J & S 122), alien nationality (Re Helbert Wagg & Co Ltd [1956] Ch 323 at pp. 345/46), race (Oppenheimer v Cattermole [1976] A C 249 at pp. 265, 276/78, 282/83), divorce (Scott v Attorney-General [1886] 11 PD 128), physical incompetence (Re Langley's Settlement Trusts [1962] Ch 541 at pp. 556/57) and prodigality (Worms v De Valdor [1880] 49L J Ch. 261 and Re Selot's Trusts [1902] 1 Ch. 488) will be disregarded. Policy is also a key component to the process for the enforcement of foreign judgments.

== Sources ==
- Cappalli, Richard B. The Disappearance of Legal Method, (1997) 70 Temp. L. Rev. 393.
- Dalton, Clare. An Essay in the Deconstruction of Contract Doctrine, (1985) 94 Yale L.J. 997.
- Goodwin-Gill, Guy, Ordre Public Considered and Developed, (1978) 94 LQR 354.
- Moufang, Rainer. The Concept of Ordre Public and Morality in Patent Law, in Geertrui Van Overwalle (Ed.), Patent Law, Ethics and Biotechnology, Katholieke Universiteit Brussel, Bruxelles, (1998).
- Richardson v. Mellish (2 Bing, 252)
