= Choice of law =

Legal process to determine whose law applies

Choice of law is a procedural stage in the litigation of a case involving the conflict of laws when it is necessary to reconcile the differences between the laws of different legal jurisdictions, such as sovereign states, federated states (as in the US), or provinces. The outcome of this process is potentially to require the courts of one jurisdiction to apply the law of a different jurisdiction in lawsuits arising from, say, family law, tort, or contract. The law which is applied is sometimes referred to as the "proper law." Dépeçage is an issue within choice of law.

== Sequence of events in conflict cases in Common Law jurisdictions ==
1. Jurisdiction. The court selected by the plaintiff must decide both whether it has the jurisdiction to hear the case and, if it has, whether another forum is more suitable (the forum non conveniens issue relates to the problem of forum shopping) for the disposition of the case. Naturally, a plaintiff with appropriate knowledge and finance will always commence proceedings in the court most likely to give a favourable outcome. This is called forum shopping and whether a court will accept such cases is always determined by the local law.
2. Recognition of foreign judgments. Even where a conflict of laws exists, the court will recognize the validity of a foreign judgment in most cases. Under U.S. law, this authority is part of the Full Faith and Credit Clause of the U.S. Constitution. Under international law, this authority is part of the doctrine of comity. The court will invoke comity by its discretion and will usually look to two factors before using its discretionary powers: did the foreign court have jurisdiction, and were fair procedures used in adjudicating the case? Under English law, it is the doctrine of obligation. Within the European Union the Brussels Recast Regulation determines jurisdiction and recognition.
3. Characterization. The court then allocates each aspect of the case as pleaded to its appropriate legal classification. Each such classification has its own choice of law rules but distinguishing between procedural and substantive rules requires care. The court may have adopted a rule of law which prevents it from applying any procedural law other than its own. This can include the court's own choice of law rules. A danger exists if the choice of law requires that a case be heard elsewhere due to the forum's lack of expertise in deciding an issue of foreign law.
4. The court then applies the relevant choice of law rules. In a few cases, usually involving family law, an incidental question can arise which will complicate this process. The United States has adopted a law that almost universally eliminates incidental questions involving family law. The Uniform Child Custody Jurisdiction and Enforcement Act (UCCJEA) requires states to apply the law of the "home state;" that is, the forum which originally determined custody and maintenance. A state court will only apply its own law when no parent retains a connection with the original jurisdiction and when substantial evidence is available in its forum to make a custody or maintenance determination.

== Choice-of-law stage ==
The "traditional approach" looks to territorial factors, e.g. the domicile or nationality of the parties, where the components comprising each cause of action occurred, where any relevant assets, whether movable or immovable, are located, etc., and chooses the law or laws that have the greatest connection to the cause(s) of action. Even though this is a very flexible system, there has been some reluctance to apply it and various "escape devices" have developed, which allow courts to apply their local laws (the lex fori) even though the disputed events took place in a different jurisdiction. The parties themselves may plead the case either to avoid invoking a foreign law or agree to the choice of law, assuming that the judge will not of his or her own motion go behind the pleadings. Their motive will be pragmatic. Full-scale conflict cases take longer and cost more to litigate. However, the courts in some states are predisposed to prefer the lex fori wherever possible. This may reflect the belief that the interests of justice will be better served if the judges apply the law with which they are most familiar, or it may reflect a more general parochialism in systems not accustomed to considering extraterritorial principles of law. One of the most common judicial strategies is to skew the characterization process. By determining that a claim is one involving a contract instead of tort, or a question of family law instead of a testamentary issue, the Court can change the choice of law rules. For example, if an employee is hired by an employer in State A, is injured due to the employer's negligence in State B, and files a lawsuit to recover for the injury in State A, the court in State A might look to the employment contract to see if it contained a clause that governed the employer's duty of care with respect to the employee. If so, the court may be able characterize the claim as a breach of the contract, instead of a tort, and apply the law of the State A either because it was the place where the contract was made (the lex loci contractus) or, if it were the place where the wage or salary was to be paid, where the contract was intended to be performed (the lex loci solutionis).

In this context, since the 1960s, the courts in the United States began developing a number of new approaches, as well as new escape devices. This reflects the number of different laws that might be relevant in any given case before an American court. There is significant interstate trade and social mobility, and with the laws of each state of the Union representing a possible opportunity for conflict, it was necessary to produce a coherent system that could be applied in the courts of all fifty states.

=== Renvoi ===
To limit the damage that would result from forum shopping, it is desirable that the same law is applied to achieve the same result no matter where the case is litigated. The system of renvoi, which literally means "send back", is an attempt to achieve that end.

== Traditional approach ==
The traditional approach is based on the idea that the territorial sovereignty of states must be respected. For example, when an event happens in a state that gives rise to a lawsuit – if two parties are involved in an automobile accident, for example – that state in which the accident occurred provides the parties with certain "vested rights". These rights include such things as the ability of a plaintiff to file a lawsuit, the imposition of a statute of limitations to prevent a defendant from being subjected to a lawsuit after too much time has passed, limitations on recovery, and specified burdens of evidence. These so-called vested rights compete with the policy claims of other states for their laws to be applied. What follows is a generalised summary of the rules. The approach in the U.S. is rather different (see Conflict of laws in the United States).

=== Status ===
Status is relevant for a wide array of issues. Self-evidently, unless the proposed litigant has legal personality, there will be no jurisdiction. It will also be relevant to immigration, entitlement to social security and similar benefits, family law, contract, etc. The choice of law rule, the law of the domicile (lex domicilii) if the forum is common law or law of nationality (lex patriae) or habitual residence if the forum is civil law, applies to determine all question of status and its legal attributes. The lex fori determines the domicile, nationality or habitual residence, and applies that law to establish an in rem set of rights and capacities. Thus, under some laws, the status of illegitimate affects the rights of inheritance in the case of an intestacy, etc. As to corporations, the choice of law rule is the law of incorporation (the lex incorporationis) for all matters of capacity, validity, shareholders' rights, etc.

=== Contracts ===
The choice of law rules for contracts are more complicated than the law affecting other obligations because they depend on the express or implied intentions of the parties and their personal circumstances. For example, questions as to whether a contract is valid may depend on the capacity of the parties to enter into a contract. This could be decided by reference to the lex domicilii, lex patriae or habitual residence of the parties, or for policy reasons, by reference to the lex loci contractus (where the contract was made). But, if the contract was made electronically, where the contract was actually made must first be decided either by the lex fori or the putative proper law depending on the forum rules. There may also be problems if the parties selected the place where the contract was made in the hope of evading the operation of some mandatory provisions in another relevant law.

On the other hand, deciding matters relating to performance will usually depend on the lex loci solutionis. Another unique characteristic of contracts is that the parties can decide which law should apply for most purposes, and memorialize that decision into the contract itself (see forum selection clause and choice of law clause) – although not every jurisdiction will enforce such provisions. For the harmonising provisions on contractual obligations in EU law, see the Rome Convention (contract).

The Rome I Regulation constrains the choice of law for special types of contracts. With a view to the weaker parties, such as consumers, employees and insurants, special choice of law rules are laid down by articles 5-8. The most important rules for companies, mostly closing contracts with consumers, are listed in Art. 6. Art. 6 (I) defines the consumer contract as a contract where the consumer acts as a private person whereas the businessman acts for his commercial purpose. This articles also says that in absence of an explicit choice of law, a protected consumer contract is governed by the law of the consumer's habitual residence. In Art. 6 (II) the involved parties are given the possibility of a free choice of law. But the choice of law is legally void, if the consumer protection is limited by this choice.

=== Tort ===
The presumptive rule for tort is that the proper law applies. This is the law that has the greatest relevance to the issues involved. In public policy terms, this is likely to be the law of the place where the key elements of the "wrong" were performed or occurred (the lex loci delicti commissi). As established in the case of Boys v Chaplin [1969], both plaintiff and defendants were British Soldiers Residents Stationed in Malta. Having an accident in Malta the court looked at the Lex Loci relating to its dual action-ability.

=== Family law ===
As to marriage, both formal and common law, the general rule is the lex loci celebrationis determines its validity, i.e. the law of the place where the marriage is celebrated, unless the purpose of the marriage offends a public policy of the domicile/nationality/habitual residence state. Hence, some states limit the capacity of their citizens to celebrate a monogamous marriage to a person of the opposite biological sex, or prohibit marriage between degrees of consanguinity, etc. Questions of nullity and divorce straddle Family Law and status because the outcome of the judicial proceedings affects status and capacities, and also overlap with the more general question of when the courts of one state will recognize and enforce the judgments of another state.

=== Property ===
The rule for immovable property (called real property in common law states) is that the lex situs applies to all questions of title. Movable property (called personal property in common law states) claims are governed by the law of the state in which the property is located at the time the rights are supposedly created. An important distinction, however, must be made for a contract which has some incidental effect on property, both immovable and movable, such as a loan with property pledged as a collateral. If the property is incidental to the contract, then the contract is evaluated under traditional choice of law principles for a contract. If, however, the primary purpose of the contract is to transfer the property, then the entire contract will be evaluated under the law of the state where the property is located.

=== Trusts and succession ===
Where an inter vivos or testamentary trust includes immovables, reference must be made to the lex situs on all aspects relating to title and land use. Similarly, title to movables including choses in action, should be determined by lex situs, i.e. the law of place where each item is located at the time the trust is created. Once created, all questions of administration are governed by the law specified in the trust instrument. In the unlikely event that the instrument is silent, the trust would be governed by the proper law.

All questions of prenuptial trusts and transfers are determined by the law of the transferor's domicile, nationality or habitual residence at the time of the marriage.

All questions relating to wills (and, as an incidental question, any testamentary trusts which the will purports to create), are governed by the law of domicile, nationality or habitual residence at the time of death. Questions of title affecting immovables are determined under the lex situs.

Illustration: Mr. "Z" died in US leaving immovable properties in US and other immovable properties in Kilimanjaro Tanzania. "lex situs" the law applicable would be of the place where the immovable is located. that is to say those in US to be administered according to the US laws and those in Tanzania according to the laws of Tanzania.(2013)
