= Procedure in conflict of laws =

In all lawsuits involving conflict of laws, questions of procedure as opposed to substance are always determined by the lex fori, i.e. the law of the state in which the case is being litigated.

== What issues are procedural? ==
This is a part of the process called characterisation. Issues identified as procedural include the following:

- By initiating the action before the forum court, the plaintiff is asking for the grant of the local remedies. This will not be a problem so long as the form of the relief is broadly similar to the relief available under the lex causae, i.e. the law selected under the choice of law rules. But forum courts may refuse a remedy in two situations:

if the effect of granting the relief sought would offend against the public policy of the forum court;
if the effect of the relief would be so different from that available under the lex causae that it makes the right sought to be enforced a different right. For example, in English law, the court was asked in Phrantzes v Argenti [1960] 2 QB 19 to enforce a Greek marriage dowry agreement. Although the forum had no public policy objections and agreed that such agreements were enforceable, relief was denied because there were no local rules to calculate the amount to be paid. A different result would have been achieved if the agreement had stipulated a liquidated sum to be paid. Thus, in Shahnaz v Rizwan [1965] 1 QB 390, a deferred mahr (dowry) was enforced as part of an ante-nuptial agreement made in India in consideration of marriage at a time when ante-nuptial agreements were not generally enforceable under English law. The judge accepted the difference between maintenance and a dowry, and enforced payment as a right ex contractu rather than as a matrimonial right. Hence, a remedy was granted to enforce a right in personam, enforceable by the wife or widow against the husband or his heirs. The same result is achieved in the United States, see Aziz v. Aziz [1985] where a New York court enforced a deferred mahr of $5,000 because the terms of the contract complied with New York's General Obligations Law. The court rejected the husband's claim that it was a matrimonial action.

- The local law determines who can sue and be sued as parties to the action. The case law on this question is not very consistent. For example, the English court held in Banque Internationale de Commerce de Petrograd v Goukassow [1923] 2 KB 682 that a dead person cannot be a party to an action even though this was possible under the lex causae. However, if a foreign entity has legal personality under the law where it was established, it can be a party to English proceedings. Thus, in Bumper Development Corp. v Commissioner of Police for the Metropolis [1991] 1 WLR 1362 an Indian temple that was "little more than a pile of stones" could be a party.
- All questions of evidence to determine the admissibility and probative value of evidence and whether a witness is competent, are dealt with under the lex fori, except that presumptions, both rebuttable and irrebuttable, are usually rules of substance. In some cases, the application of the lex fori makes sense—after all, if the forum rules require legal documents to be printed in a twelve-point font, and the choice of law state requires the same documents to be printed in a fourteen-point font, it makes little sense to require the court to determine which font size should be used in a choice of law dispute. However, many contentious cases have centred on findings that issues such as the burdens of proof, the admissibility of evidence, and statutes of limitations are procedural rather than substantive, because these rules can change the outcome of a case.
- In the Law of Contract Article 10(c) EC Convention on the Law Applicable to Contractual Obligations (Rome 1980) provides that the assessment of damages is a matter for the lex causae. In other cases, the cause of action will give rise to issues that are both procedural and substantive. For example, in tort questions of remoteness and causation will be determined by the lex causae whereas the quantification of damages will be determined by the lex fori.
- The status of statutes of limitations is usually regarded as having public policy implications, particularly where foreign periods are either very long or very short. In extreme cases, the lex fori will be applied to protect the interests of vulnerable parties, e.g. the English court held in Jones v Trollope Colls Cementation, The Times, January 26, 1990, that a foreign limitation period of twelve months would be ignored because the plaintiff had spent a significant proportion of this time in hospital and had been led to believe her claim would be met. In the U.S., statutes of limitations would normally be considered procedural, but most states have enacted so-called borrowing statutes, which "borrow" the statute of limitations for the cause of action from the state in which the cause of action arose.
- The lex fori determines whether a foreign judgment can be recognised and, if so, how it will be enforced, e.g. what property belonging to the defendant may be taken to satisfy the judgment (see enforcement of foreign judgments). But in the Law of Contract, this is subject to Article 10 of the Rome Convention 1980 which provides that the applicable law governs the consequences of breach, including the quantification of damages.
