= Conflict of tort laws =

Aspect of law

In conflict of laws, the choice of law rules for tort are intended to select the lex causae by which to determine the nature and scope of the judicial remedy to claim damages for loss or damage suffered.

== History ==
The first attempts to establish a coherent choice of law rule for tort cases involving a foreign law element varied between favouring the lex fori (i.e. the law of the court) and the lex loci delicti commissi (i.e. the law of the place where the tort was committed). The public policy of territorial sovereignty was always the principal consideration. Hence, the forum courts claimed their right to apply their laws to determine whether any lawsuit initiated in their jurisdiction allowed a remedy. Equally, it is the commission of a tort that vests a right of action in a claimant and therefore, it should always be for the law of the place where that right was created to determine the extent of any remedy flowing from it. In the end, a compromise emerged where the lex loci delicti was the first point of reference but courts retained a discretion to substitute the lex fori if the foreign law was deemed unfair and other practical considerations pointed to the application of forum law.

In the U.S., see the New York decision in Babcock v. Jackson, 191 N.E.2d 279 (N.Y. 1963) for a discussion of the issues. This led to a debate in which state interests, rather than strict territorial connections, were suggested as the basis of a new test. In 1971, the American Law Institute produced the Second Conflicts Restatements and section 6 provides that the applicable law should be the one with the "most significant relationship" to the tort. In other common law states, a parallel movement occurred and resulted in the adoption of a proper law test. In substance, both forms are similar in their approach.

== Explanation ==
The presumptive choice of law rule for tort is that the proper law applies. This refers to the law that has the greatest relevance to the issues involved. In public policy terms, this is usually the law of the place where the key elements of the "wrong" were performed or occurred (the lex loci delicti). So if A is a pedestrian injured by B's negligent driving, the law of the state in which the injury occurs would logically be applied because, in public policy terms, the citizens of that state have a clear interest in regulating the standard of driving on their roads. That either or both the parties might have domiciles outside that state would be irrelevant. But, if A buys a car from B in State X and drives it into State Y where A is injured by a defect in the car, the choice of law is not as evident: there is potential liability both for breach of contract and for negligent misstatement, deceit and failure to adequately maintain the vehicle prior to sale. There is no genuine connection either in fact or law with the law of State Y. It was pure chance that the injury occurred there. In fact, the law of State X is the lex loci contractus and the most appropriate law since everything relevant to the potential tortious liability occurred in that state which has the greatest interest in maintaining consumer confidence in the motor trade. Thus, no matter where A sues B, the forum court should apply the law of State X to resolve the various causes of action. For these purposes, the forum conveniens would be the State in which B has residence and/or holds assets. One of the key considerations in any conflict dispute is the enforceability of the resulting judgment. Courts are more willing to accept cases with a foreign law element when one of the parties is domiciled or has residence within their territorial jurisdiction, or has assets against which judgment can be levied.

However, if the tort was intentional, there are two competing theories as to which law is the most appropriate. For example, A writes a defamatory letter in State X and posts it to B in State Y, clearly damaging the reputation of C in State Y. The initiatory or subjective theory provides that the proper law is the law of the state in which all the initial components of the tort occurred. In the example given, A may never have left State X and the argument would be made that State X would have the better claim to determine the extent of liability for those who, whether temporarily or not, owe it allegiance. Hence, if A sent a reference to B about C in the ordinary course of business, or submitted for publication by B a review of an artistic work by C, the policy claims of State X would be strong. The terminatory or objective theory provides that the law of the state in which the last component occurred (i.e. where the loss or damage was sustained) should be the proper law. Here, the argument is that unless and until the damage is sustained, the tort is not complete. Unlike criminal law, there is no liability for attempted tort. Hence, since the tort does not exist to give rise to liability until the letter is read by B in State Y, only State Y has an interest in the application of its laws. There is no international agreement on which theory is to be preferred and each state therefore applies its local choice of law rules. But the enforceability of any judgment would be a relevant consideration. Suppose that the law of State X might offer a partial or complete defence to A. Hence, C naturally prefers to invoke the jurisdiction of State Y's courts. If there is no system for reciprocal and automatic registration and enforcement of judgments between the two states, State Y (and any other State in which jurisdiction might be sought) would be reluctant to accept the case since no court likes to waste its time in hearing a case if it is not going to be enforceable.

In summary, therefore, selecting the proper law in tort cases is subject to a balancing of public policy and practical considerations and, although each set of choice of law rules will give an indication of likely outcome, the individual decisions on the merits are not strictly subject to precedent and outcomes may vary depending on circumstances.

== European harmonisation provisions ==
Under Article 4 of the proposed Rome II Regulation on the Law Applicable to Non-Contractual Obligations (22 July 2003), there would be a general presumption that the lex loci delicti will apply subject to either:

- an exception in Paragraph 2 for the application of the law to any common habitual residence between the parties. The concept of habitual residence is the civil law equivalent of the common law test of lex domicilii. This exception will be satisfactory so long as the laws are substantially the same on the claimed relief.
- an exception in Paragraph 3 for cases in which "the non-contractual obligation is manifestly more closely connected with another country. . ." the so-called proximity criterion.

Until formal guidance is given on the circumstances in which either exception will operate, there will either be considerable forum shopping to select the states with the most favourable interpretation, or courts will resolve the uncertainty by applying the lex fori.

In product liability cases, Article 5 selects the law of the injured party's habitual residence if the product was marketed there with the consent of the defendant. The rationale is that if a defendant knows of, and is benefiting from, sales in the plaintiff's state, the choice of that state's law is reasonable.

Article 6 specifies the lex fori for actions arising out of breach of privacy or defamation, a rule that may increase the risk of forum shopping. Whether the plaintiff has any right of reply in a defamation case will be determined under the law of the state where the broadcaster or publisher is established.

In cases where contract and tort issues overlap, Article 9 proposes that the same law govern both sets of issues.

== English law ==
=== General rule ===
With the exception of defamation which continues to apply the proper law test, s10 Private International Law (Miscellaneous Provisions) Act 1995 abolishes the "double actionability" test, and s11 applies the lex loci delicti rule subject to an exception under s12 derived from Boys v Chaplin [1971] AC 356 and Red Sea Insurance Co Ltd v Bouygues SA [1995] 1 AC 190. Thus, it is no longer necessary for the case to be based on a tort actionable in England. The English courts must apply wider international tests and respect any remedies available under the "Applicable Law" or lex causae including any rules on who may claim (e.g. whether a personal representative may claim for a fatal accident) and who the relevant defendant may be (i.e. the English court would have to apply the applicable law's rules on vicarious liability or the identity of an "occupier" of land).

The first step is for the court to decide where the tort occurred, which may be complicated if relevant events took place in more than one state. s11(2) distinguishes between:

- actions for personal injuries: it is the law of the place where the individual sustained the injury;
- damage to property: it is the law of the place where the property was damaged;
- in any other case, it is the law of the place in which the most significant element or elements occurred.

The first two tests seem to provide a workable balance between the interests of the claimant and the defendant by selecting the law of the place in which the claimant suffered the harm, but problems remain. In Henderson v Jaouen (2002) 2 All ER 705 there was continuing damage as the condition arising from original injury deteriorated. Similarly, in Roerig v Valiant Trawlers Ltd. [2002] 1 Ll Rep 681, where the accident occurred on board an English ship, the main consequences in terms of loss were felt by the deceased's family in the Netherlands (their habitual residence), not England. The third rule which will apply in economic torts, breach of privacy etc., requires a test comparable to the proper law. In Multinational Gas and Petrochemical Co v Multinational Gas and Petrochemical Services Ltd [1983] Ch 258 negligent management decisions were based on financial reports prepared in England. Because the decisions were taken and the losses were sustained outside England, English law was not the most significant. In Metall und Rohstoff AG v Donaldson Lufkin & Janrette Inc [1990] 1 QB 391 action in New York induced a breach of contract in England where the loss was sustained, so English law was the more significant.

=== Section 12 ===
In exceptional circumstances, the lex loci delicti rule is displaced in favour of another law, if the "factors relating to the parties" or "any of the events which constitute the tort" show that this other law will be substantially more appropriate. Suppose that an English employer sends an employee on a business-related journey to Arcadia. During the course of this journey, the employee is injured while driving a car provided by the employer for this purpose. All the relevant connecting factors favor the application of English law except that the injury itself was sustained elsewhere. In Edmunds v Simmonds (2001) 1 WLR 1003 it was held more appropriate to displace the lex loci delicti and to apply English law to the consequences of a road traffic accident in Spain involving two English friends who had travelled abroad for a short holiday and where the majority of the losses and expenses were suffered in England. In Morin v Bonhams and Brooks Ltd. (2003) 2 AER (Comm) 36 a bad buy was made in Monaco as a result of allegedly fraudulent information "fed" to the buyer in London. The case involved representations made about the qualities of a classic car auctioned by the defendants in Monaco and bought by the claimant who had received the brochure which made the alleged misrepresentations in England. He had, to a certain extent, relied on them in England, by arranging to travel to Monaco for the auction, and he had suffered loss in England where the car was found not to meet the description in the brochure. The car had, however, been subject to auction in Monaco where the bid sum was payable. The court held that the claimant's decision to bid and to commit himself to the purchase that was "by far the most significant" act, and that was done in Monaco. The judge offered the obiter dicta that had the claimant made a telephone bid from England, a different judgment would probably have been made.
