= Forum non conveniens =

Conflict of laws legal doctrine

Forum non conveniens (FNC; Latin for 'an inconvenient forum') is a mostly common law legal doctrine through which a court acknowledges that another forum or court where the case might have been brought is a more appropriate venue for a legal case, and dismisses the case. Forum non conveniens may be used to dismiss a case, for example, to encourage parties to file a case in another jurisdiction within which an accident or incident underlying the litigation occurred and where all the witnesses reside.

As a doctrine of the conflict of laws, forum non conveniens applies between courts in different countries and between courts in different jurisdictions in the same country. Forum non conveniens is not applicable between counties or federal districts within a state.

A concern often raised in applications of the doctrine is forum shopping, or picking a court merely to gain an advantage in the proceeding. This concern is balanced against the public policy of deferring to a plaintiff's choice of venue in claims where there may be more than one appropriate jurisdiction. The underlying principles, such as basing respect given to foreign courts on reciprocal respect or comity, also apply in civil law systems in the form of the legal doctrine of lis alibi pendens.

Forum non conveniens is not exclusive to common law nations: the maritime courts of the Republic of Panama, although not a common law jurisdiction, also have such power under more restrained conditions.

== Explanation ==
A country, state, or other jurisdiction enacts laws which are interpreted and applied through a system of courts. The laws applied by a particular system of courts or legal system are termed the lex fori, or law of the forum. As a matter of civil procedure, courts must decide whether and in what circumstances they will accept jurisdiction over parties and subject matter when a lawsuit begins. This decision will be routine, or not raised at all, if the relevant elements of the case are within the territorial jurisdiction of the court. If one or more of the parties resides outside the territorial jurisdiction or there are other factors which might make another forum more appropriate, the question of jurisdiction must be settled.

=== Historical origin ===
Scholars and jurists agree that the concept is of a Scottish origin. Many early Scottish cases invoking FNC were under admiralty law. FNC thus may ultimately have a civil law origin, as has been asserted by several writers, since admiralty law is based in civil law concepts. However, there is no equivalent in the French Civil Code or Roman law.

In ''Piper Aircraft Co. v. Reyno'' (1981), the U.S. Supreme Court established that while a domestic plaintiff's choice of forum is usually given strong deference, a foreign plaintiff's choice is entitled to less deference because the central focus of the doctrine is convenience rather than the plaintiff's preference.

In Scotland, the concept was developed in the 18th century and was later incorporated into English common law. It was first adopted in Scotland in 1610, the case being Vernor v Elvies [1610] Mor 4788, as an extension of forum non competens; two English residents were tried in Scotland argued a Scottish trial would be inconvenient, the court ruling "The Lords will not find themselves Judges betwixt two Englishmen". It was expanded and applied in the 1860s (in Clements v Macauley [1866] 4 S 224 and Longworth v Hope [1865] 3 S 1049), which led to its incorporation into English law. The pleading was used in situations where the competence of the court was unchallenged (unlike forum non competens) but the court was asked to invoke its discretion.

The doctrine had been applied in several jurisdictions under varying names; in the 1793 case Robertson v Kerr, a Massachusetts court refused to apply jurisdiction in a case involving a foreign transaction between non-residents.

According to the "parental function" of Soviet law, the 1964 R.S.F.S.R. code of civil procedure recognised the doctrine of forum non conveniens for civil procedures.

=== United Kingdom ===
As a member of the European Union, the United Kingdom signed the Brussels Convention. The Civil Jurisdiction and Judgments Act 1982 as amended by the Civil Jurisdiction and Judgments Act 1991 states:

Nothing in this Act shall prevent any court in the UK from staying, sisting [staying or stopping a process, or summoning a party], striking out or dismissing any proceedings before it on the ground of forum non conveniens or otherwise, where to do so is not inconsistent with the 1968 [Brussels] Convention or, as the case may be, the Lugano Convention.

The case of Owusu v Jackson and Others before the European Court of Justice, was concerned with the relationship between Article 2 of the Brussels Convention and the scope of FNC within the European Community. In Owusu, the English Court of Appeal asked the ECJ whether it could stay a matter brought to it under Article 2 Brussels Convention pursuant to the English FNC rules. The Court held that the Brussels Convention was a mandatory set of rules designed to harmonise and so produce a predictable system throughout the EU. If states were able to derogate from the Convention using their domestic rules of civil procedure, this would deny a uniform result to proceedings based on forum selection. Hence, at 46. the ECJ held:

the Brussels Convention precludes a court of a Contracting State from declining the jurisdiction conferred on it by Article 2 of that convention on the ground that a court of a non-Contracting State would be a more appropriate forum for the trial of the action even if the jurisdiction of no other Contracting State is in issue or the proceedings have no connecting factors to any other Contracting State.

However, some UK commentators argue that the FNC rules may still apply to cases where the other proceedings are not in a Member state but this remains uncertain. A Scottish Court may sist its proceedings in favour of the Courts of England or Northern Ireland on the ground of FNC, since this is settling intra-UK jurisdiction.

=== Australia ===
In the jurisdictions where the FNC rule survives, a court will usually dismiss a case when the judge determines that the dispute would be better adjudicated in a different forum. After a period of split approach to forum non conveniens, the High Court adopted a consolidated application of the rule in Voth v Manildra Flourd Mills (1990) 171 CLR 538. This decision affirmed the judgement of Justice Deane in Oceanic Sun Line Special Shipping Co v Fay (1988) 165 CLR 197, whereby his Honour departed from the traditional test and articulated the "clearly inappropriate forum" test.

In Voth, the High Court of Australia refused to adopt the "more appropriate forum" approach and instead affirmed Justice Deane's test. This approach requires that continuation of proceedings in Australia would cause vexation or oppression on the defendant, to such an extent that it would amount to a serious injustice. The court found that their approach retained the rationale of the traditional doctrine, while sparing them unduly time consuming considerations associated with the complex questions arising under the traditional test.

Notable subsequent developments of the test include the Zhang and the Henry cases. In Regie National des Usines Renault SA v Zhang (2002) 210 CLR 491, the High Court affirmed the "clearly inappropriate forum" test as Australian law, while stating that even where the law of a foreign country had to be applied to decide a case, Australia would not be a "clearly inappropriate" forum for hearing the matter. In Henry v Henry (1996) 185 CLR 571, the High Court found that it would be prima facie vexatious and oppressive to commence proceedings in Australia after proceedings for substantially the same subject matter were initiated in another jurisdiction.

=== Canada ===
The doctrine of FNC in Canada was considered in Amchem Products Inc. v. British Columbia Worker's Compensation Board, [1993] 1 S.C.R. 897. The Court held that the test for striking out a claim for FNC is where "there is another forum that is clearly more appropriate than the domestic forum." If the forums are both found to be equally convenient, the domestic forum will always win out.

Convenience is weighed, using a multi-factored test that includes elements such as: the connection between the plaintiff's claim and the forum, the connection between the defendant and the forum, unfairness to the defendant by choosing the forum, unfairness to the plaintiff in not choosing the forum, involvement of other parties to the suit (i.e. location of witnesses), and issues of comity such as reciprocity and standard of adjudication.

The Supreme Court has underlined that FNC inquiries are similar to but distinct from the Real and Substantial connection" test used in challenges to jurisdiction. The most important difference is that applying FNC is a discretionary choice between two forums, each of which could legally hear the issue.

The law of the province of Quebec, Canada is slightly different. The Quebec Civil Code 1994, at art. 3135 c.c.q., provides:

Even though a Quebec authority has jurisdiction to hear a dispute, it may exceptionally and on an application by a party, decline jurisdiction if it considers that the authorities of another country are in a better position to decide.

The practical effects are identical to any other jurisdiction but the wording used by the code is different. For decisions applying art. 3135 c.c.q., see H.L. Boulton & Co. S.C.C.A. v. Banque Royale du Canada (1995) R.J.Q. 213 (Quebec. Supr. Ct.); Lamborghini (Canada) Inc. v. Automobili Lamborghini S.P.A. (1997) R.J.Q. 58 (Quebec. C.A.); Spar Aerospace v. American Mobile Satellite (2002) 4 S.C.R. 205, and Grecon Dimter Inc. v. J.R. Normand Inc. (2004) R.J.Q. 88 (Quebec. C.A.)

=== United States ===
The defendant may move to dismiss an action on the ground of FNC. Invoking this doctrine usually means that the plaintiff properly invoked the jurisdiction of the court, but it is inconvenient for the court and the defendant to have a trial in the original jurisdiction. The court must balance convenience against the plaintiff's choice of forum. In other words, if the plaintiff's choice of forum was reasonable, the defendant must show a compelling reason to change jurisdiction. If a transfer would simply shift the inconvenience from one party to the other, the plaintiff's choice of forum should not be disturbed.

Generally, a corporation sued in the jurisdiction of its headquarters is not entitled to seek an FNC dismissal. Thus if an American corporation is sued in an area where it only transacts business but not where it has its headquarters, and the court dismisses based upon FNC, the plaintiff may refile the action in the jurisdiction of the corporation's headquarters.

In deciding whether to grant the motion, the court considers:

- The location of potential witnesses. The defendant must make a full and candid showing, naming the potential witnesses for the defense, specifying their location, specifying what their testimony may be and how crucial it is for the defense, and setting forth how exactly they may be inconvenienced by having to testify in the court chosen by plaintiff.
- The location of relevant evidence and records. The defendant must identify the records; explain who is in charge of the records; address necessity, language, and translation problems; address the volume of such records; address the law governing these records; and rule out the existence of duplicate records in the jurisdiction chosen by the plaintiff. The mere fact that records need to be translated is not sufficient grounds to invoke FNC.
- Possible undue hardship for the defendant. The defendant must explain what the hardship is and how material the costs are. If there are costs involved, they need to be spelled out. If there is a difficulty in getting witnesses out of a foreign court and into the original court, this needs to be revealed to the court. The defendant must explain why the use of letters rogatory or other judicial reciprocity tools are not sufficient and cannot replace actual transfer of the case. The standard that the defendant must meet is “overwhelming hardship” if they are required to litigate in the forum's State.
- Availability of adequate alternative forums for the plaintiff. Merely pointing out that the plaintiff could have sued somewhere else is not sufficient to succeed on an FNC motion.
- The expeditious use of judicial resources. In practice, this is just boilerplate language that comes along with the application. However, sometimes the court chosen by the plaintiff may be logistically or administratively unfit or ill‐equipped for the case; for example, a case may involve a large number of torts.
- The choice of law applicable to the dispute. If all other factors weigh in favor of keeping the case in the jurisdiction where it was filed, then the court may choose between application of local law (lex fori) or relevant foreign law. Thus, the mere fact that foreign law may apply to the event, circumstances, accident, or occurrence is not a strong reason to dismiss the case on FNC grounds.
- Questions of public policy. In analyzing the factors, the subject matter of the complaint may touch on a sensitive issue that is important to the laws of either the original jurisdiction or the alternative forum. Those public policy issues must be pinpointed, analyzed and briefed in a way that makes it clear why this issue overrides the other factors. For example, an employee suing a foreign corporation in a state of employment, may enjoy the public policy to protect local employees from foreign abusers. See the Federal Employers Liability Act (FELA) for further reference.

Additional factors include:

- The location where the cause of action arose. In most states, defendant must usually show that the cause of action arose outside of the jurisdiction.
- The identities of the parties. Who is suing whom? Is the plaintiff suing an individual defendant or a small company without financial means as a method to oppress the defendant with financial and legal costs by litigating in a remote court? Is the defendant a conglomerate making the FNC application simply to force the plaintiff to bear expensive costs of travel and retainer of foreign lawyers? A plaintiff who is a resident in the state where action was filed is normally entitled to have his case heard in his home state.
- Vexatious motive. Where there is no evidence that the plaintiff had improper intent in bringing the case specifically in a particular forum, courts usually deny the FNC motion.
- Jurisprudential development and political conditions at the foreign forum. Is the court going to send the plaintiff to a land where the law is underdeveloped, uncivilized, or where there is no equal protection or due process? Is the court going to send the plaintiff to another court in a country where violence is rampant or in the middle of a war? A suit will not be dismissed if the foreign court does not permit litigation of the subject matter of the complaint, no live testimony of the plaintiff is required by appearance, or if the foreign law is otherwise deficient in its protocols or procedures.

The determination of the court may not be arbitrary or abusive as this is a drastic remedy to be applied with caution and restraint.

As for the transfer of a trial to a jurisdiction outside of the U.S., courts will only grant the transfer if a foreign court is “more appropriate”, and there may be a real opportunity to obtain justice there.

In New York, for example, there is a strong presumption in favor of the plaintiff's choice of forum. See Gulf Oil v. Gilbert, 330 U.S. 501, 508 (1947); R. Maganlal & Co., 942 F.2d 164, 167 (2nd Cir. 1991); Wiwa v. Royal Dutch Petroleum Co., 226 F.3d 88, 101 (2d Cir. 2000); and Maran Coal Corp. V. Societe Generale de Surveillance S.A., No. 92 CIV 8728, 1993 US.Dist. LEXIS 12160 at *6 (S.D.N.Y. September 2, 1993). A defendant must show compelling evidence in order to disturb the choice of forum. The burden of proof is on the defendant: Strategic Value Master Fund, Ltd. v. Cargill Fin. Serv. Corp., 421 F.2d 741, 754 (S.D.N.Y. 2006). The court must also consider the defendant's vast resources compared with the plaintiff's limited resources as an aggrieved individual: See Wiwa at 107: “defendants have not demonstrated that these costs [of shipping documents and witnesses] are excessively burdensome, especially in view of defendant’s vast resources”. Also, Presbyterian Church of Sudan v. Talisman Energy, Inc., 244 F.Supp.2d 289 (S.D.N.Y. 2003) at 341: “A countervailing factor is the relative means of the parties”.

In 2006, the 2nd Circuit Federal Court in New York issued a decision in the famous Coca-Cola case. Coca-Cola took over assets of Jews expelled from Egypt in the 1950s and was sued in New York. Bigio v. Coca-Cola Company, 448 F.3d 176 (2d Cir. 2006), certiorari to Sup. Ct. denied. In that case, the plaintiffs were Canadians and non‐residents of New York. The court denied Coca-Cola's FNC motion and the U.S. Supreme Court denied certiorari. The 2nd Circuit stated that the fact that the New York court would need to apply “modest application” of Egyptian law was not a problem because “courts of this Circuit are regularly called upon to interpret foreign law without thereby offending the principles of international comity”. Also, the fact that there were witnesses abroad was not a problem either. They could be flown into the U.S. or Letters Rogatory could be issued to the Egyptian courts to collect their testimony. Further, it was held that in an FNC scenario, a court applies the balance of conveniences, but preference (and weight) must be given to the fact that plaintiffs chose this particular forum for “legitimate reasons”. The fact that plaintiffs could sue in Canada was not relevant because Coca-Cola was a U.S. company and it was “perfectly reasonable to sue in the US”.

== Europe ==
The doctrine of FNC gained little footing in the civil law world, which prefers the approach of lis alibi pendens (see Articles 21-23 Brussels Convention). The civil law jurisdictions generally base jurisdiction on the residence of the defendant and on choice of law rules favouring the habitual residence of the parties, the lex situs, and the lex loci solutionis (applying actor sequitur forum rei). This reflects an expectation that a defendant should be sued at his "own" courts, modified to reflect different priorities in certain types of case. As an example of this expectation, Article 2 Brussels I Regulation (as well as the corresponding Lugano conventions) provides:

Subject to the provisions of this Convention, persons domiciled in a Contracting State shall, whatever their nationality, be sued in the courts of that State.

Persons who are not nationals of the State in which they are domiciled shall be governed by the rules of jurisdiction applicable to nationals of that State.

But this is subject to the substantial exceptions contained in Articles 3–6, the limitations on insurance actions in Articles 7–12, and consumer contracts in Articles 13–15. Article 16 also grants exclusive jurisdiction to specified jurisdictions as the lex situs of immovable property and a res, and for the status of companies, the validity of public registers with particular reference to the registration and validity of patents, and the enforcement of judgments. Subsequent articles allow forum selection clauses and other forms of agreement between the parties to confer jurisdiction on a given forum. The Brussels Regime therefore represents a harmonised set of rules for the determination of all questions of jurisdiction throughout the EU and EFTA (but not Liechtenstein) excluding FNC.

== Shipping ==
The issue of FNC arises in shipping cases since different parties may be involved as charterers or consignees and because of the international nature of the law of the sea and maritime trade. Despite several different conventions dealing with aspects of international trade, jurisdictional disputes are common. Moreover, in some instances, a case in the United States may be initiated under U.S. state law when Admiralty law (which is a Federal jurisdiction) would be the more appropriate forum. If this occurs, the case may be removed to the Federal Courts or to the courts of another state on FNC grounds.

For example, suppose that a container ship comes into port in Miami, Florida, United States. The ship, which is Liberian-registered, is wanted as security for various debts incurred by its Master while in Denmark. Made aware of the ship's presence, a local lawyer moves to impose a lien which involves a form of arrest by means of de novo proceedings in rem. The local Federal district sitting in Admiralty determines that the ship's Master had ostensible authority as an agent to pledge the credit of the ship's owners (who are English). It also determines that neither the ship nor its owners have violated American law in any way, and the local court is not in a good position to hear witnesses who are all resident in other states. Further, major liability in demurrage to the innocent charterers, forwarders, etc. will be incurred if the ship is detained without just cause, so it would not be unreasonable for the Federal Court to decline jurisdiction. Whether there is subsequent litigation in another state will depend on the tactics of the creditors. Without a lien over the ship or the ability to obtain some form of control over the assets of the debtor, making a claim for money owing may not be cost-effective. But if there have already been proceedings on the issue of liability before a court of competent jurisdiction in another state so that the action in Miami is purely by way of enforcement, the Miami jurisdiction, whether it be state or federal would be the forum conveniens because the ship is physically within the jurisdiction.

== Bibliography ==
- Lindell, Geoffrey. (2002). "Regie National des Usines Renault SA v. Zhang: choice of law in torts and another farewell to Phillips v Eyre but the Voth test retained for forum non conveniens in Australia." October, Melbourne Journal of International Law.
