= Forum selection clause =

Contract clause which requires disputes to be resolved in a given manner or court

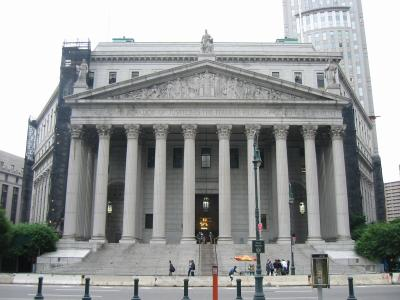
Forum selection clauses often gravitate towards the courts of large commercial centres, like London, New York (pictured) and Hong Kong.

In contract law, a forum selection clause (sometimes called a dispute resolution clause, choice of court clause, governing law clause, jurisdiction clause or an arbitration clause, depending on its form) in a contract with a conflict of laws element allows the parties to agree that any disputes relating to that contract will be resolved in a specific forum. They usually operate in conjunction with a choice of law clause which determines the proper law of the relevant contract.

== Forms ==
Forum selection clauses may seek to restrict the choice of forum for litigation in three ways:

- The clause may require that all disputes must be litigated in a particular court in a jurisdiction agreed upon by the parties;
- The clause may require that disputes must be resolved pursuant to a dispute resolution process, such as mediation, arbitration, or a hearing before a special referee or expert determination; or
- The clause might combine those approaches, such as by first requiring a specific dispute resolution process to be followed and, if that process fails to resolve the dispute, for any subsequent litigation to be conducted in a particular court.

A simple forum selection clause covering both the proper law of the contract and the forum for resolving disputes might provide:

This contract is governed by the laws of England and any dispute shall be finally resolved by the English courts.

When defining a particular jurisdiction for the resolution of disputes, a forum selection clause may take one of two forms:

- A jurisdiction clause that confirms that a particular court may be used by the relevant parties, but does not preclude a party from commencing proceedings in another court; or
- An exclusive jurisdiction clause that mandates that all disputes be resolved by a specific court.

=== Asymmetric clauses ===
Typically a forum selection clause applies to all parties to the contract. However it is possible for a contract to state that if A wishes to sue B, then one procedure applies, and if B wishes to sue A, a different procedure applies. These are various called "option clauses", "asymmetric clauses" or "hybrid clauses".

The validity of asymmetric clauses differs in various legal system. For example, they are generally enforceable under English law, but not under French law.

Similarly, one party may be afforded alternative dispute resolution options. For example, a loan agreement may provide that if the borrower wishes to bring proceedings against the lender, that can only be done by way of arbitration. But if the lender wishes to make a claim against the borrower they may do so by way of arbitration or by proceedings in a certain court.

== Procedure ==
Within the context of litigation, when an issue may be subject to being resolved under the laws of more than one jurisdiction, the Court must engage in a choice of law analysis in order to decide which of several competing laws should be applied to resolve the dispute.

If the parties have selected a jurisdiction as the place for the resolution of a dispute, the court hearing the litigation may nevertheless apply the laws of the forum (lex fori), including general choice of law principles. Thus, the forum court may identify and apply a foreign law as the proper law for resolution of the dispute. The parties will thus often also include a choice of law clause within their contract, so as to specify both the forum and the law to be applied therein. If a contract only specifies the forum, the absence of a choice of law clause suggests that the parties intended that choice of law issues be decided according to the laws of the forum.

Examples of reasons for selecting a specific forum include:

- the parties' belief that the forum has significant expertise in the areas of law relevant to the subject matter of their contract;
- the parties impressions of the quality of judicial decision-making in the forum:
- the parties' belief that the court's procedures are efficient and thus likely to expedite the resolution of a dispute;
- convenience to the parties, for example if all of the major witnesses to a possible dispute reside within the selected jurisdiction;
- to make it more difficult for a party to the dispute to claim that the selected forum is not convenient such that the case should be transferred to a different forum.

== Enforceability ==
Forum selection clauses have been criticised by a minority of courts as improper attempts to divest them of personal jurisdiction over the parties. Some jurisdictions refuse to give effect to these clauses, declaring them to be void as against public policy. However, most jurisdictions recognize and enforce forum selection clauses, as long as the parties made the selection in good faith. If the parties make an express selection, this choice will be respected by a court as long as it is a bona fide choice. A court may decline to uphold such an agreement for reasons including:

- the purpose of the clause was to evade the application of some mandatory provisions of a relevant law,
- there was an element of fraud or duress or undue influence involved in the signing of the contract, or
- there was some other evidence of bad faith (mala fides).

Unlike most contractual clauses, a choice of forum clause may remain enforceable even after a contract is determined to be void. Many legal systems, including English law, provide that jurisdiction and arbitration clauses may still be enforced even when the party relying upon the clause asserts that the contract as a whole is void.

== Effect of breach ==
The existence of a forum selection clause in an agreement normally enables a court to take jurisdiction in a particular matter. When.a party commences litigation in a different forum, the clause may persuade the court to decline jurisdiction.

Forum selection clauses are sometimes enforced against proceedings filed in foreign courts by use of an anti-suit injunction.

Although it is theoretically possible to sue for damages for bringing proceedings in breach of a jurisdiction clause, such claims are rare.

== Related clauses ==
In a complex agreement the forum selection clause will often be accompanied by a number of related clauses (either in the same contract or in a collateral document). These may include:

- appointment of an agent to receive service of process in the relevant jurisdiction - this facilitates initiating process and avoids the need to make an application to court for leave to serve a defendant out of the jurisdiction (service ex juris)
- waiver of any objection to the chosen forum - for example, parties may add a clause where each party waives their right to assert forum non conveniens. This precludes or limits the ability of litigants to apply for proceedings to be stayed or dismissed on the grounds that they have been brought in an inappropriate forum.
- contractual submission to the relevant jurisdiction - this assists in any application to enforce a subsequent judgment in another state
- waiver of a right to trial by jury in the relevant forum - especially if the chosen forum is in the United States
- an arbitration clause requiring the parties to resolve their disputes through arbitration in the appropriate forum
- waiver of other procedural provisions which might apply to foreign litigants, such as the right the request they post security for costs
- waiver of any applicable sovereign immunity which a party might have the benefit of

== Worldwide ==
=== Canada ===
Forum selection clauses were addressed by the Supreme Court of Canada in Z.I. Pompey v ECU Line, 2003 SCC 27. The dispute arose after a breach of a bill of lading resulted in damage to equipment in transit. The exclusive forum selection clause indicated that any claims had to be brought forth in Antwerp. The Supreme Court endorsed forum selection clauses for providing "certainty and security in transaction". The Court reaffirmed the strong cause test found in the English Eleftheri case.

Absent other applicable legislation, the Pompey Test asks whether there is an enforceable contract binding the parties. If there is, the court must grant a stay unless the plaintiff demonstrates sufficiently strong reasons to show that they should not be bound by the forum selection clause. The Court, in exercising its discretion, should consider factors such as: where evidence is situated or more readily available, whether foreign law applies and whether it differs from domestic law, the country with which the parties are connected and how closely, whether the defendants are seeking procedural advantages, and whether the plaintiffs would be prejudiced by the need to sue in a foreign court.

==== Specific issues ====
===== Commercial contracts =====
Forum selection clauses in a commercial contract are typically strictly enforced. In Expedition Helicopters Inc. v Honeywell Inc. [2010 ONCA 51], the Ontario Court of Appeal outlined factors which may justify departing from enforcement including: the plaintiff was induced to agree to the clause, the contract is otherwise unenforceable, the selected forum is unwilling or unable to accept jurisdiction, the claim or circumstances are outside of what was reasonably contemplated by the parties in agreeing to the clause, the plaintiff cannot longer expect a fair trial in the forum due to subsequent events that could not have been reasonably anticipated, or the enforcement of the clause would frustrate clear public policy.

===== Consumer contracts =====
In Douez v Facebook, 2017 SCC 33, the Supreme Court of Canada refused to enforce a forum selection clause between Facebook and a class of users. The plurality of the Court found that the contract was enforceable. However, the plaintiff met the burden of demonstrating strong cause as to why the clause should not be enforced. Factors considered in the majority's decision included: the nature of the right (constitutional right to privacy), the gross inequality of bargaining power between the parties, the lack of alternatives for the consumers, the interest of the courts, clarity and certainty. Secondary factors included the relative cost and inconvenience to parties as well as the purpose and intent of the legislation. Justice Abella found that the contract was unconscionable and thus unenforceable under step one of the Pompey test.

In Uber Technologies Inc. v Heller, 2020 SCC 16, the Supreme Court of Canada also refused to enforce an arbitration clause between Uber and a class of drivers. The clause indicated that disputes were to be resolved by arbitration in the Netherlands. The majority held the clause was unconscionable and thus unenforceable. They assert that standard form contracts can create inequality of bargaining power between the parties. The Court asserted that choice of law, forum selection and forced arbitration clauses can deprive parties of possible remedies thus violating their reasonable expectations.

===== Consumer contracts (Quebec) =====
Quebec's Civil Code renders forum-selection and arbitration clauses in consumer and employment contracts unenforceable. In consumer transactions involving Quebec residents, Article 3149 provides jurisdiction to Quebec Courts to hear the dispute.

=== United States ===
The United States Supreme Court has upheld forum selection clauses on several occasions and has suggested that they should generally be enforced. See The Bremen v. Zapata Off-Shore Company, 407 U.S. 1 (1972); Carnival Cruise Lines, Inc. v. Shute, 499 U.S. 585 (1991); Atlantic Marine Construction Co. v. U.S. District Court for the Western District of Texas, 571 U.S. 49 (2013). The Bremen and Carnival Cruise cases, however, arose under the Court's admiralty jurisdiction, not under diversity of citizenship jurisdiction.

A court in the United States will typically distinguish between exclusive and non-exclusive forum selection clauses. Two October 2011 appellate rulings illustrate the difference. In Future Industries of America v. Advanced UV Light GmbH, 10–3928, the United States Court of Appeals for the Second Circuit in New York City affirmed the dismissal of a case that sent the parties to Germany because the forum selection clause made German courts the exclusive forum. By contrast, the same court in Global Seafood Inc. v. Bantry Bay Mussels Ltd., 08–1358, affirmed the refusal of the lower court to refer the parties to Ireland because the clause was not exclusive.

The state of New York has a statute that directs New York courts not to dismiss a case on the grounds of forum non conveniens if the parties' contract provides that the agreed upon venue is a court in New York and if the transaction involved an amount more than $1 million. Other states have enacted similar statutes directing their courts to enforce forum selection clauses choosing their own courts.

It is common for U.S. states to enact statutes directing their courts not to enforce a forum selection clause choosing the courts of another jurisdiction when the clause is written into a particular type of contract. In Minnesota, for example, an outbound forum selection clause is not enforceable when it is written into a construction contract, a consumer lease, a consumer short-term loan, a covenant not to compete, a franchise agreement, a motor-vehicle franchise agreement, or a sales representative agreement. These invalidating statutes are routinely enforced by state courts. These same statutes are, however, sometimes ignored by federal courts that take the position that federal law (not state law) should govern the question of whether a forum selection clause is enforceable. In one 2024 case, a federal court in Puerto Rico enforced a Massachusetts forum selection clause in a distribution agreement even though enforcement ran directly contrary to Puerto Rico public policy and the clause would not have been enforced by a commonwealth court.

Empirical studies have found that U.S. court enforce outbound forum selection clauses in the overwhelming majority of cases where they are challenged.

=== Specific issues ===
==== Corporate bylaws ====
Prior to 2010, it was uncommon for American corporations to insert forum selection clauses in their bylaws. But that situation changed. Surveying the case law in 2015, Bonnie Roe, Daniel Tabak, and Jonathan Hofer have argued (in Lexology) that forum selection bylaws have become an established part of corporate governance in only a few short years. Their conclusion is that a board of directors adopting a forum selection bylaw "can reasonably expect" that the bylaw will be enforced.

==== Consumer contracts ====
The enforceability of forum selection clauses in the consumer field is controversial. Many opponents of enforcement argue that the contracts that include such forum selection clause are contracts of adhesion. This position is well summarized in an article in the Chicago-Kent Law Review by Marty Gould, who argues that, unlike most federal courts – which have enforced such clauses in the consumer context – a state court in Illinois correctly refused enforcement in connection with a claim relating to an online dating service contract. Proponents of enforceability take issue with the assertion of adhesion.

==== Scope of a forum selection clause ====
Courts are often required to determine whether a forum clause covers all parties (including non-signatories) to a transaction. Many courts resolve the scope issue by applying the "closely related" test. See e.g. Manetti-Farrow, Inc. v. Gucci America, Inc. and Roby v. Lloyd’s. Writing in International Aspects of U.S. Litigation, Eric Sherby argues that most courts that have addressed the issue have glossed over the circular nature of the finding of "closely related" and that even those few judicial decisions that evince an awareness of the circularity problem have themselves fallen into the circular reasoning trap.

==== Franchise and dealership disputes ====
A number of American states have enacted statutes that require franchisors to agree to litigate disputes with franchisees in-state. Those states include California, Wisconsin, and New Jersey. Although not all of these statutes contain language of exclusivity, the case law has generally interpreted these statutes as invalidating contractual clauses that require disputes to be resolved out of the franchisee's home state.

== Proposed international convention ==
In 2005, the Hague Conference on Private International Law issued the Hague Choice of Court Convention. The Hague Convention does not apply to disputes involving consumers, for example Quebec's Consumer Protection Act.
