= Child and Family Agency v RD =

Irish Supreme Court case

- Coat of arms of Ireland
- Court: Supreme Court of Ireland
- Full case name: Child and Family Agency v RD
- Decided: 18 July 2014
- Citation: [2014] IESC 47

Court membership
- Judges sitting: Justice O'Donnell, Justice McKechnie, Justice Laffoy

Keywords
- Children; Right to Travel; Jurisdiction; Family law; Injunction

Child and Family Agency v RD [2014] IESC 47 is an Irish Supreme Court case in which the Court confirmed that jurisdiction of EU states which first issue orders have primacy but that the High Court in Ireland has the right under EU law to grant provisional protection orders to allow a child to stay in Ireland. The case clarified the jurisdiction of Irish courts under Article 20 of the European Union's Council Regulation No 2201/2003 on parental responsibility.

== Background ==
In January 2014, RD and her son, P, moved from Birmingham to Ireland. In February, an order was made by the Birmingham County Court to place P in the care of the Child and Family Agency. A subsequent order by the UK High Court, was made in April, for P to return to England. P was found in Dublin with his father, who authorities believed to be abusive. RD contended that the father had followed them there and she was no longer in a relationship with him.

In June 2014, the UK High Court made two orders. The first was a declaration under Article 17 of Regulation 2201/2003 which meant that Ireland did not have jurisdiction to decide matters concerning parental responsibility of P. This declaration was made on the grounds that the courts of England and Wales were first to hold the issue of care and custody of the child. The second order was made pursuant to Article 20 of the Regulation, and meant that the child would be placed in the care of Birmingham City Council. However, the child would be allowed to finish his school year.

RD appealed these orders in the Supreme Court arguing that she had been a victim of domestic violence and wanted to protect her child, who may be at risk of harm if returned to England. RD expressed in a letter that she was appealing against her child's return to England under the care of the Birmingham City Council. She argued that the care order was made in England when she was already living in Ireland and she was therefore, unaware of the order. The Child and Family Agency advised the court that P wished to remain in Ireland with his mother and that he was doing well in care. The court dismissed the appeal against the declaration made by the UK High Court under Article 17. The court adjourned its decision for the appeal against the order pursuant to Article 20.

== Holding of the Supreme Court ==
Justice O'Donnell delivered the only written judgment for the Supreme Court (with which the other judges agreed).

=== Article 17 ===
It was decided that the courts of England and Wales have jurisdiction pursuant to Article 17. The consequence of this decision is that, it is for the English and Welsh courts to decide on the care and custody of children whose habitual residence is in England and Wales.

=== Article 20 ===
Justice O'Donnell stated that the Irish Supreme Court has jurisdiction pursuant to Article 20, which is provisional and protective relief. Article 20 provides that Member States may exercise its jurisdiction to grant provisional and protective relief to assist in foreign proceedings. It must appropriate for a court to grant this relief.

=== Conclusion ===
The Court dismissed the appeal against the declaration made pursuant to Article 17 and adjourned the court for one week pursuant to Article 20.

== Subsequent developments ==
The Supreme Court's decision in Child and Family Agency v RD was subsequently referred to three times in the judgement of CFA v CJ and JS. RD was referred to in paragraph 45, where it was decided that the Irish courts do not have jurisdiction to rule on the matter of parental responsibility of an English resident.

RD was also relied upon in paragraph 59, where the court stated that, the High Court had jurisdiction pursuant to Article 20, to make provisional and protective measures regarding foreign proceedings.

RD was again referred to in paragraph 65, where the court acknowledged the principles set out in RD. Justice Finlay Geoghegan stated that the High Court "cannot have any greater jurisdiction pursuant to Article 20 than that determined by O'Donnell J".
