= Lex loci =

Rules a court uses to choose the law under which a case will be decided

In conflict of laws, the term lex loci (Law Latin for "the law of the place") is a shorthand version of the choice of law rules that determine the lex causae (the laws chosen to decide a case).

== General principles ==
When a case comes before a court, if the main features of the case (particularly the parties and the causes of action) are local, the court will then apply the lex fori, the prevailing municipal law, to decide the case. However, if there are "foreign" elements to the case, the court may then be obliged, under conflict of laws, to consider whether it has jurisdiction to hear the case (see forum shopping). The court must then characterise the issues to allocate the factual basis of the case to its relevant legal classes. The court may then be required to apply the choice of law rules to decide the lex causae, the law to be applied to each cause of action.

Relevant rules include the following.

== Lex causae ==
Lex causae (Latin for "law of the cause"), in conflict of laws, is the law chosen by the forum court from the relevant legal systems when it judges an international or interjurisdictional case. It refers to the usage of particular local laws as the basis or "cause" for the ruling, which would itself become part of referenced legal canon.

Conflict of laws regulates all lawsuits involving foreign law if the outcome of a legal action would differ by the laws applied. Once the forum court has ruled that it has jurisdiction to hear the case, it must then decide which possible law is to be applied.

== Lex concursus ==
The lex concursus (or, sometimes, lex fori consursus) is the Latin term for the "law of the place of insolvency proceedings" relating to cross-border insolvency. It is also sometimes used more generally in relation to the distribution of a limited fund within the control of the court.

== Lex domicilii ==
The lex domicilii or lex loci domicilii is the Latin term for "law of the domicile" in the conflict of laws. Conflict is the branch of public law regulating all lawsuits involving a "foreign" law element where a difference in result will occur depending on which laws are applied.

== Lex fori ==
Lex fori (Latin: the law of the forum) is a choice of law rule. If applicable, it provides that the law of the jurisdiction or venue in which a legal action is brought applies.

When a court decides that it should, by reason of the principles of conflict of law, resolve a given legal dispute by reference to the laws of another jurisdiction, the lex causae, the lex fori still governs procedural matters.

== Lex loci actus ==
In the conflict of laws, lex loci actus or lex actus is the law of the place where the act occurred that gave rise to the legal claim. This is often confused with lex loci delicti commissi which is where the tort is committed. While typically they both point to the same location, in the case of product liability, for example, the lex loci actus would be the place of manufacturing, while the lex loci delicti commissi would be the place of injury.

== Lex loci arbitri ==
The lex loci arbitri is the Latin term for "law of the place where arbitration is to take place" in the conflict of laws. Conflict is the branch of public law regulating all lawsuits involving a "foreign" law element where a difference in result will occur depending on which laws are applied.

When a case comes before a court and all the main features of the case are local, the court will apply the lex fori, the prevailing municipal law, to decide the case. But if there are "foreign" elements to the case, the forum court may be obliged under the conflict of laws system to consider:

- whether the forum court has jurisdiction to hear the case (see the problem of forum shopping);
- it must then characterise the issues (i.e., allocate the factual basis of the case to its relevant legal classes); and
- then apply the choice of law rules to decide which law is to be applied to each class.

The lex loci arbitri is an element in the choice of law rules applied to cases testing the validity of a contract. As an aspect of the public policy of freedom of contract, the parties to an agreement are free to include a forum selection clause or a choice of law clause and, unless there is a lack of bona fides, these clauses will be considered valid. If there is no express selection of a proper law, the courts will usually take the nomination of a forum as a "connecting factor", i.e. a fact that links a case to a specific geographical location. For these purposes, one of the "forums" that may be selected is arbitration. Hence, the fact that the parties have chosen a state as the place of arbitration is an indication that parties may have intended the local law to apply. This indication will be weighed alongside other connecting factors. The state that has the largest number of connecting factors will be the lex causae applied to resolve the dispute between the parties. If there is a tie, the connecting factors which relate to performance will be given a greater weighting.

== Lex loci celebrationis ==
Lex loci celebrationis is a Latin term for a legal principle in English common law, roughly translated as "the law of the land (lex loci) where it was celebrated". It refers to the validity of the union, independent of the laws of marriage of the countries involved: where the two individuals have legal nationality or citizenship, or where they live (reside or are domiciled). The assumption under the common law is that such a marriage, when lawfully and validly celebrated under the relevant law of the land, is also lawful and valid.

=== British legal tradition ===
In the United Kingdom, the jurisdiction of England, or England and Wales, as well as in many other legal jurisdictions largely or partly following the British tradition of jurisprudence, in addition to their modified local versions of the English common law, the legal principle behind the legal term was modified, qualified and further elaborated, both by legal developments in the common law (Lord Dunedin's Berthiaume v D'Astous case (HL 1930) (AC 79), in which Dunedin in the Appellate Committee of the House of Lords ruled that "If a marriage is good by the laws of the country where it is effected, it is good all the world over, no matter whether the proceedings or ceremony which constituted marriage according to the law of the place would not constitute marriage in the country of the domicile of one or other of the spouses. If the so-called marriage is no marriage in the place where it is celebrated, there is no marriage anywhere, although the ceremonial proceedings if conducted in the place of the parties’ domicile would be considered a good marriage"), as well as by codification in statute by the Foreign Marriage Act 1892 (55 & 56 Vict. c. 23). Under the English common law, whether a party needs to be present is treated as a formality of the marriage ceremony, so if a proxy marriage is valid by the law of the place where the marriage was celebrated then it will be recognised in England.

== Lex loci contractus ==
In the conflict of laws, the lex loci contractus is the Latin term for "law of the place where the contract is made".

== Lex loci delicti commissi ==
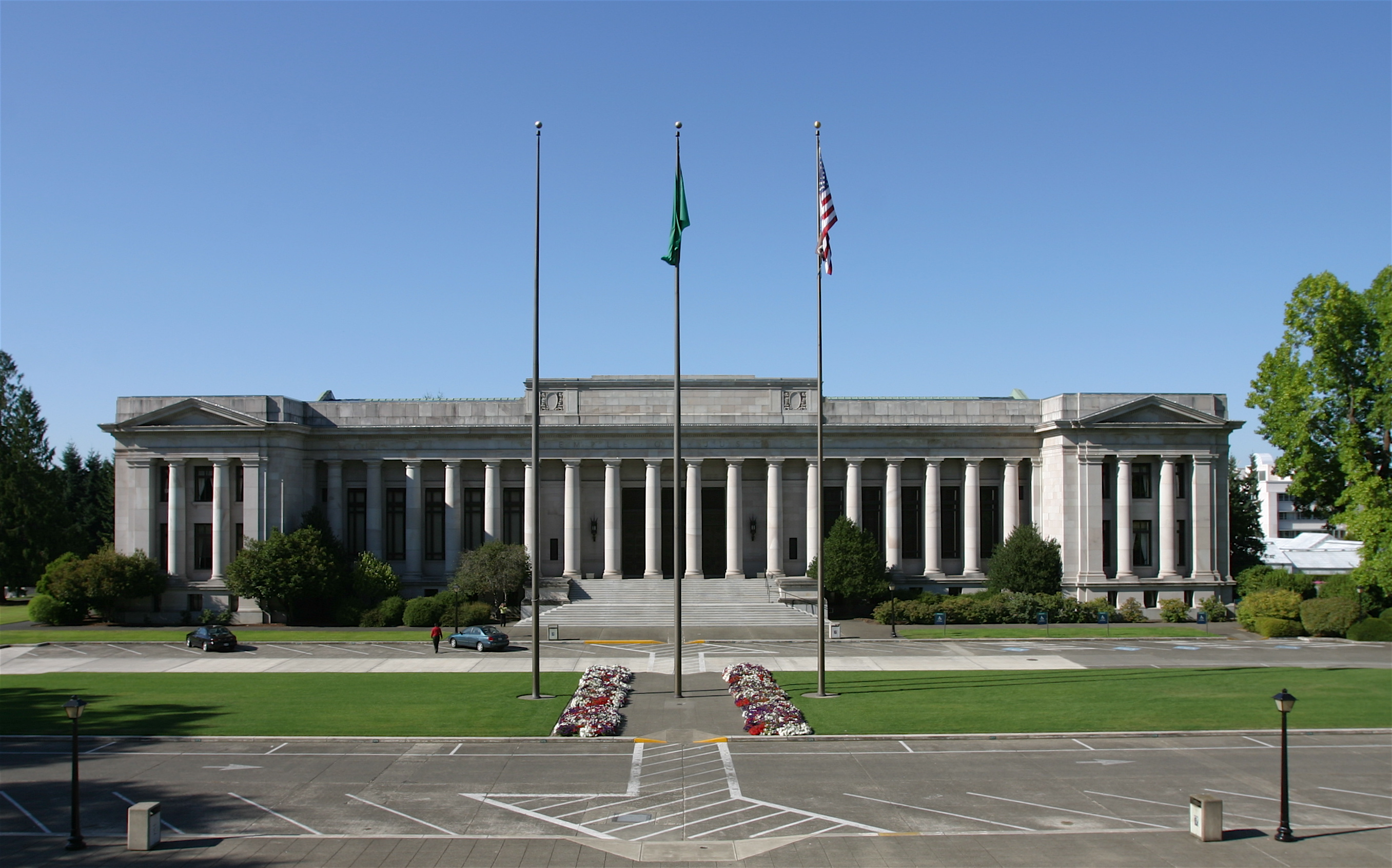
The Washington Supreme Court meets in the Temple of Justice in Olympia. There is also a Federal Court. Two courts with overlapping jurisdictions can create a conflicts of law in torts (delict) cases.

The lex loci delicti commissi or lex loci delictus is the Latin term for "law of the place where the delict [tort] was committed" in the conflict of laws. Conflict of laws is the branch of law regulating all lawsuits involving a "foreign" law element where a difference in result will occur depending on which laws are applied.

The term is often shortened to lex loci delicti.

== Lex loci protectionis (Schutzlandprinzip) ==
Lex loci protectionis (Latin: "[the] law of the place where the protection is [claimed]") is a choice of law rule applied to cases concerning the infringement of intellectual property (IP) rights, such as copyrights or patents.

It stipulates that the law applied to such cases is the law of the locus protectionis, that is, the law of the country for which legal protection for the intellectual property is claimed. Consequently, the law of the country where the intellectual property was created or registered is not applied.

Lex loci protectionis is generally accepted as the prevailing choice of law rule for IP rights, at least as concerns the existence, validity, scope and duration of the rights. Article 8 (1) of the European Union's Rome II Regulation codifies it as follows:

The law applicable to a non-contractual obligation arising from an infringement of an intellectual property right shall be the law of the country for which protection is claimed.

== Lex loci rei sitae (or Lex situs) ==
Lex loci rei sitae (Latin for "law of the place where the property is situated"), or simply lex situs, is the doctrine that the law governing the transfer of title to property is dependent upon and varies with the location of the property, for the purposes of the conflict of laws. Conflict is the branch of public law regulating all lawsuits involving a "foreign" law element if a difference in result will occur, depending on which laws are applied.

== Lex loci solutionis ==
Lex loci solutionis (Latin: "law of the place of performance"), in conflict of laws, is the law applied in the place of an event.

Lex loci solutionis is one of the possible choice of law rules applied to cases that test the validity of a contract or that deal with a tort. For example, if a person domiciled in Bolivia and a person habitually resident in Germany make a contract by e-mail and agree to meet in Arizona to research a book, there would be several possibly-relevant choice of law rules:

- the lex domicilii, lex patriae or the law of habitual residence to determine whether the parties had the capacity to enter into the contract;
- lex loci contractus, which could be difficult to establish since both parties never left their own state (reliance on postal rules for offer and acceptance in the several putative lex causae might produce different results)
- lex loci solutionis might be the most relevant since Arizona is the most closely connected to the substance of the obligations assumed
- the proper law
- lex fori, which might have public policy issues if one of the parties is a minor.

== Lex patriae ==
Lex patriae (Latin: law of the fatherland, in modern usage, nationality law), in conflict of laws, is the system of public law applied to a lawsuit if a choice is to be made between two or more laws that would change the outcome.

== Locus in quo ==
Locus in quo means, in British common law, the "scene of the event"

The phrase comes from the Latin language, meaning "The place in which".

In civil cases, locus in quo refers to "the place where the cause of action arose", that is, the land to which the defendant trespassed. In criminal cases, it may be used to refer to the scene of the crime. It may also be used, more generally, as any place mentioned, that is, the venue or place mentioned.

== See also ==
- Choice of law
- Domicile
- Hannah v Peel
- Latin phrases
- Privilegium fori
- Tort
- Trespass
