= Lex loci contractus =

Resolving contractual disputes under law of wherever the contract was created

In contract law, the lex loci contractus is the Law Latin term meaning "law of the place where the contract is made". It refers (in the context of conflict of laws) to resolving contractual disputes among parties of differing jurisdictions by using the law of the jurisdiction in which the contract was created.

== Explanation ==
When a case comes before a court and all the main features of the case are local, the court will apply the lex fori, the prevailing municipal law, to decide the case. But if there are "foreign" elements to the case, the forum court may be obliged under the conflict of laws system to consider:

- whether the forum court has jurisdiction to hear the case (see the problem of forum shopping);
- it must then characterise the issues, i.e. allocate the factual basis of the case to its relevant legal classes; and
- then apply the choice of law rules to decide which law is to be applied to each class.

The lex loci contractus is one of the possible choice of law rules applied to cases testing the validity of a contract. For example, suppose that a person domiciled in Canada and a person habitually resident in France, make a contract by e-mail. They agree to meet in New York State to record a CD of hip hop music. The possibly relevant choice of law rules would be:

- the lex domicilii and law of habitual residence to determine whether the parties had the capacity to enter into the contract;
- the lex loci contractus which could be difficult to establish since neither party left his own jurisdiction (reliance on postal rules for offer and acceptance in the several putative leges causae might produce different results);
- the lex loci solutionis might be the most relevant since New York is the most closely connected to the substance of the obligations assumed;
- the proper law; and
- the lex fori which might have public policy issues if, say, one of the parties was an infant.

== Implications ==
The provisions of this legal concept can be construed to confirm the following:

- If a contract is valid where it was consummated, it is (generally) valid everywhere (i.e. in all comity states);
- If a contract is void where it was consummated, it is void everywhere (i.e. in all comity states);
- An exception in comity exists: The agreement will not be held valid in the forum country if it violates the law of the forum country, or if it violates the law of nature, or if it violates the Law of God;
- A contract may be deemed valid in lex loci contractus, but if it is a revenue law of that state it will not be enforced in the forum state.

If a contract is consummated in one state but its content specifies that it is to be carried out in another state, two loci are thus generated: locus celebrate contractus (where it was signed) and locus solutionis (where it is to be performed). The laws of the locus celebrate contractus state will govern all matters concerning the mode of constructing the contract, the meaning of each factor therein, the nature of the contract, and its validity. The laws of the locus solutionis state will apply to the performance or execution of the contract.

== Determination at law ==
Sometimes, the locus contractus is difficult to determine, for example if the contract was signed at sea or on a moving train or if the details of the contract signing were not well documented. If a court is called upon to determine the applicable state, it may use any or all of the following factors:

- The residence or main domicile of the signatory parties;
- The main place of business of the signatory parties;
- The state in which the business was incorporated;
- The state nominated for arbitration proceedings in case of a conflict (lex loci arbitri);
- The language used to write the contract;
- The format of the contract (only relevant if the contract format is unique to a state or group of states within the comity group);
- The currency in which payment for performance of the contract is specified to be paid;
- The nation of registration of any ship involved in performance of the contract;
- The state where completion of the contract is specified to occur (lex loci solutionis);
- A pattern of similar contracts involving the same parties;
- The state where any third parties to the contract are located;
- The state where any insurance companies connected with the contract are located.

== See also ==
- Lex loci celebrationis
- Lex loci delicti commissi
- Lex loci rei sitae
