= Sri Jumahaliah Hanifa =

Indonesian legal scholar (born 1924)

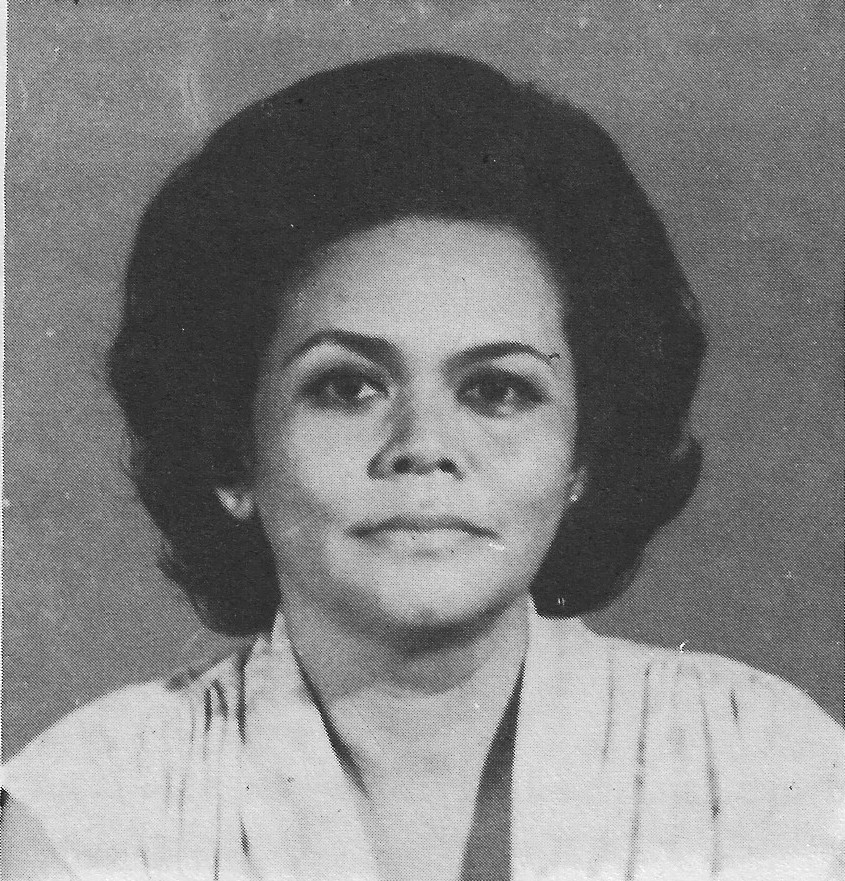

Dean of the Faculty of Law of the University of Indonesia
- In office 1978 – 29 February 1984
- Preceded by: Padmo Wahyono
- Succeeded by: Mardjono Reksodiputro

Personal details
- Born: 7 November 1924 Bandung, West Java, Dutch East Indies
- Died: 18 November 1991 (aged 67)
- Education: University of Indonesia (S.H.)

Sri Jumahaliah Hanifa Wiknyosastro (7 November 1924 – 18 November 1991) was an Indonesian legal scholar and university administrator who was the dean of the Faculty of Law of the University of Indonesia from 1978 until 1984.

== Career ==
Born on 7 November 1924 in Bandung, Sri began teaching at the University of Indonesia upon receiving her law degree from the university. She also taught as an associate professor at the Military Law Academy, lecturing on private international law. She was appointed as the head of the faculty's education bureau in 1964, before being appointed as deputy dean for academic affairs by dean Padmo Wahyono in 1974. Two years later, she became the deputy dean for community service. She succeeded Padmo as dean in 1978 and became the first woman to lead the faculty. She was reappointed as dean on 17 February 1981 and served until she was replaced by Mardjono Reksodiputro on 29 February 1984.

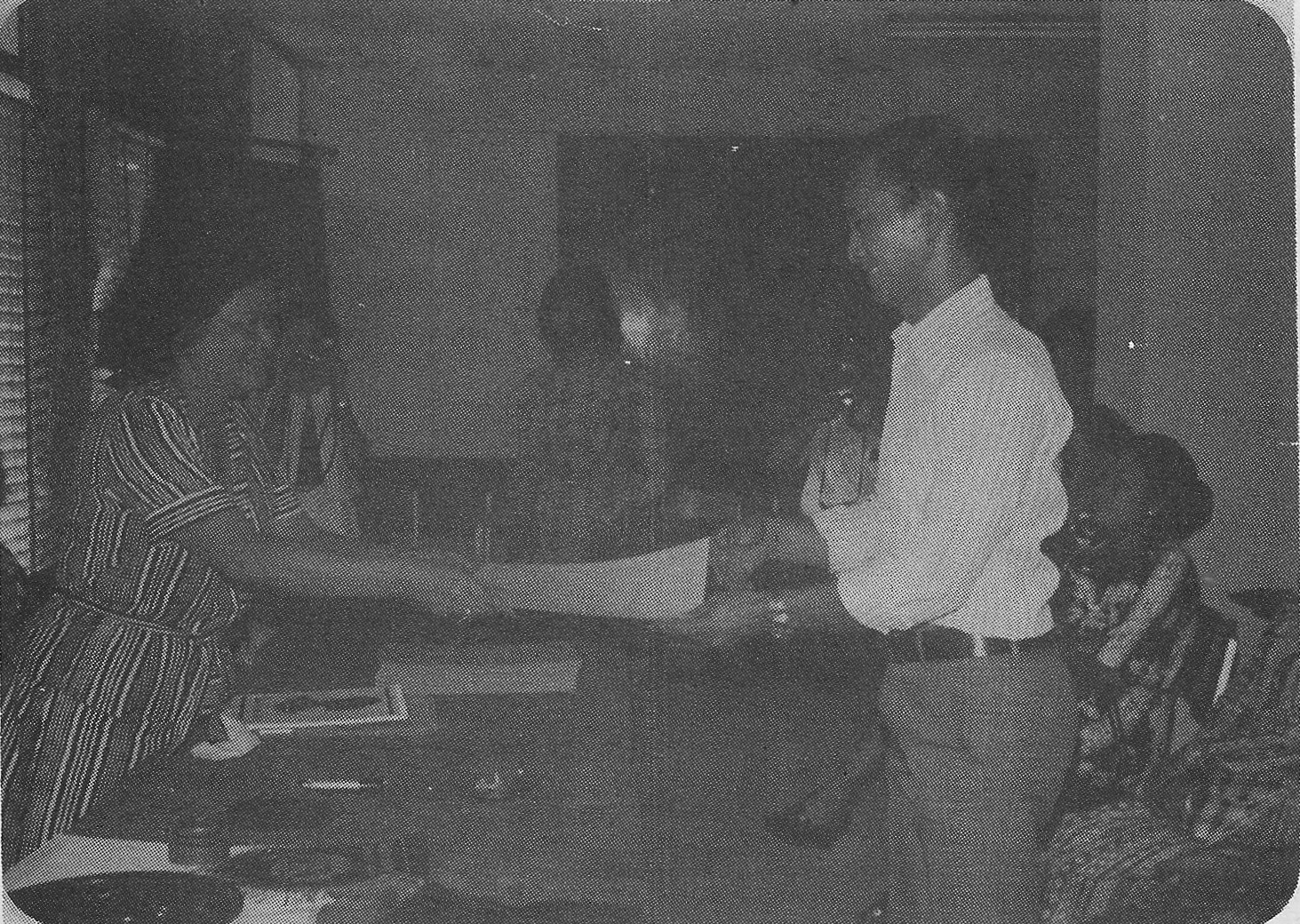
Sri (left) handing over a certificate to a course participant.

During her tenure as dean, in 1978 the faculty held an exhibition of legal literatures published in Indonesia since 1842. In 1979, she formed a working team to establish a postgraduate programme in the faculty, which was chaired by her successor Mardjono Reksodiputro. The postgraduate programme was established on 19 January 1981, with Secretary to the Minister of Environment Koesnadi Hardjasoemantri as its coordinator. The management of the programme was transferred from the law faculty to the postgraduate faculty two years later.

After serving as dean, Sri became the head of the international law department in the faculty and the coordinator for transnational relations law specialization in the undergraduate programme.

== Personal life ==
Sri was married to Hanifa Wiknyosastro, a professor of obstetrics and gynaecology at the University of Indonesia. The couple has three sons. She died on 18 November 1991 and was buried at the Tanah Kusir public cemetery.
