= Hilton Moscow Leningradskaya =

Hotel in Moscow, Russia

- Гостиница Ленинградская
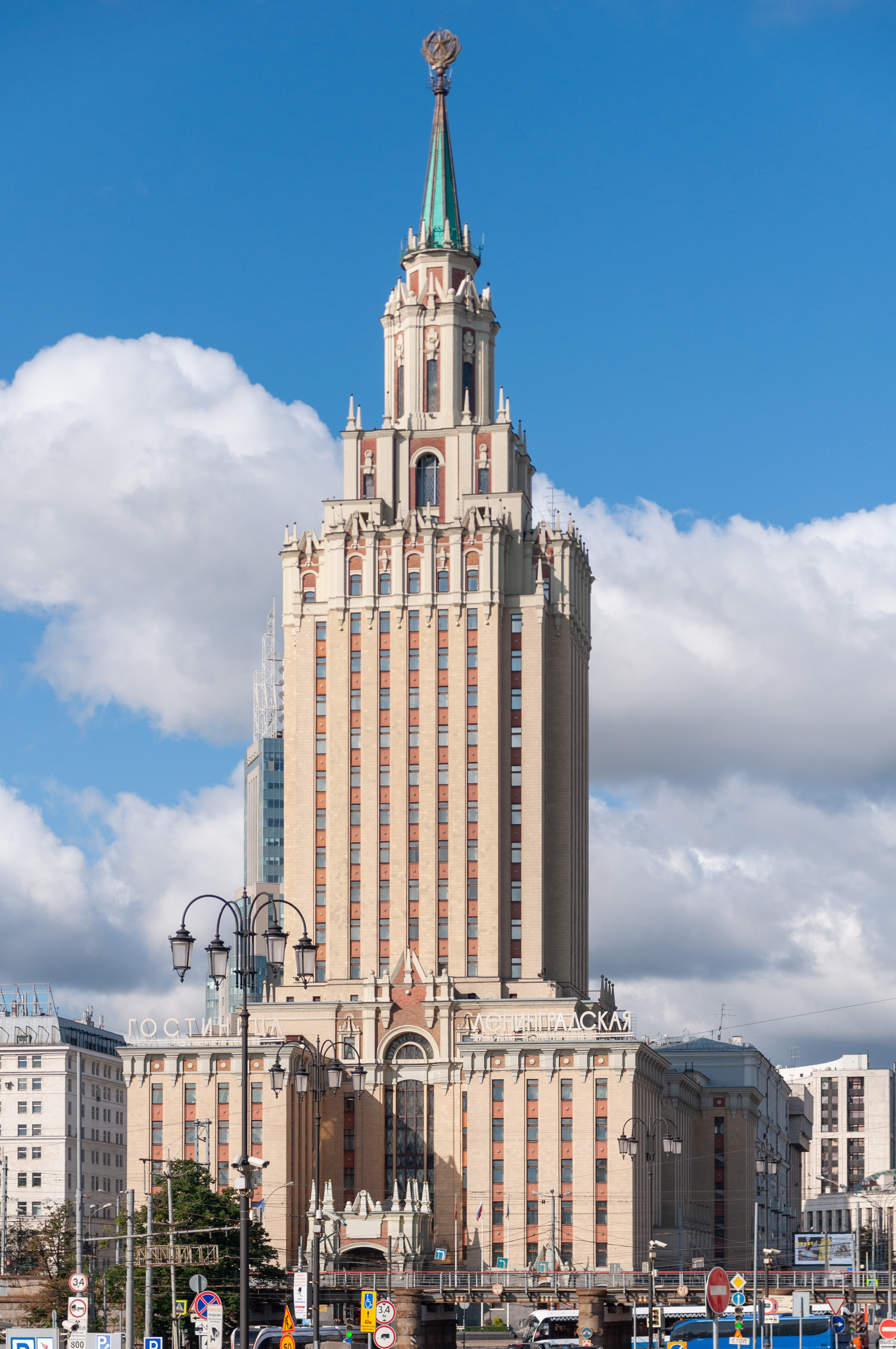
- Interactive map of the Hilton Moscow Leningradskaya area

General information
- Type: Hotel
- Architectural style: Stalinist
- Location: Komsomolskaya Square, Moscow, Russia
- Coordinates: 55°46′26″N 37°39′06″E
- Completed: 1954
- Opening: 2008
- Owner: Hilton Worldwide
- Management: Hilton Hotels & Resorts

Height
- Roof: 136 m (446 ft)

Technical details
- Floor count: 21 (of which 19 are usable)
- Lifts/elevators: 4 (of which 3 are for guests and 1 for staff)

Website
- Official website

The Hilton Moscow Leningradskaya (Russian: Гостиница Ленинградская) is one of Moscow's Seven Sisters, skyscrapers built in the early 1950s in the Stalinist neoclassical style. Stalinist neoclassical architecture mixes the Russian neoclassical style with the style of American skyscrapers of the 1930s. A main element of Stalinist neoclassicism is its use of socialist realism art. The hotel, completed in 1954, was designed to be the finest luxury hotel in Moscow.

The staircase features one of the longest lighting fixtures in the world—it was once in The Guinness Book of Records. The halls and corridors of the hotel's upper floors are panelled in dark cherry wood.

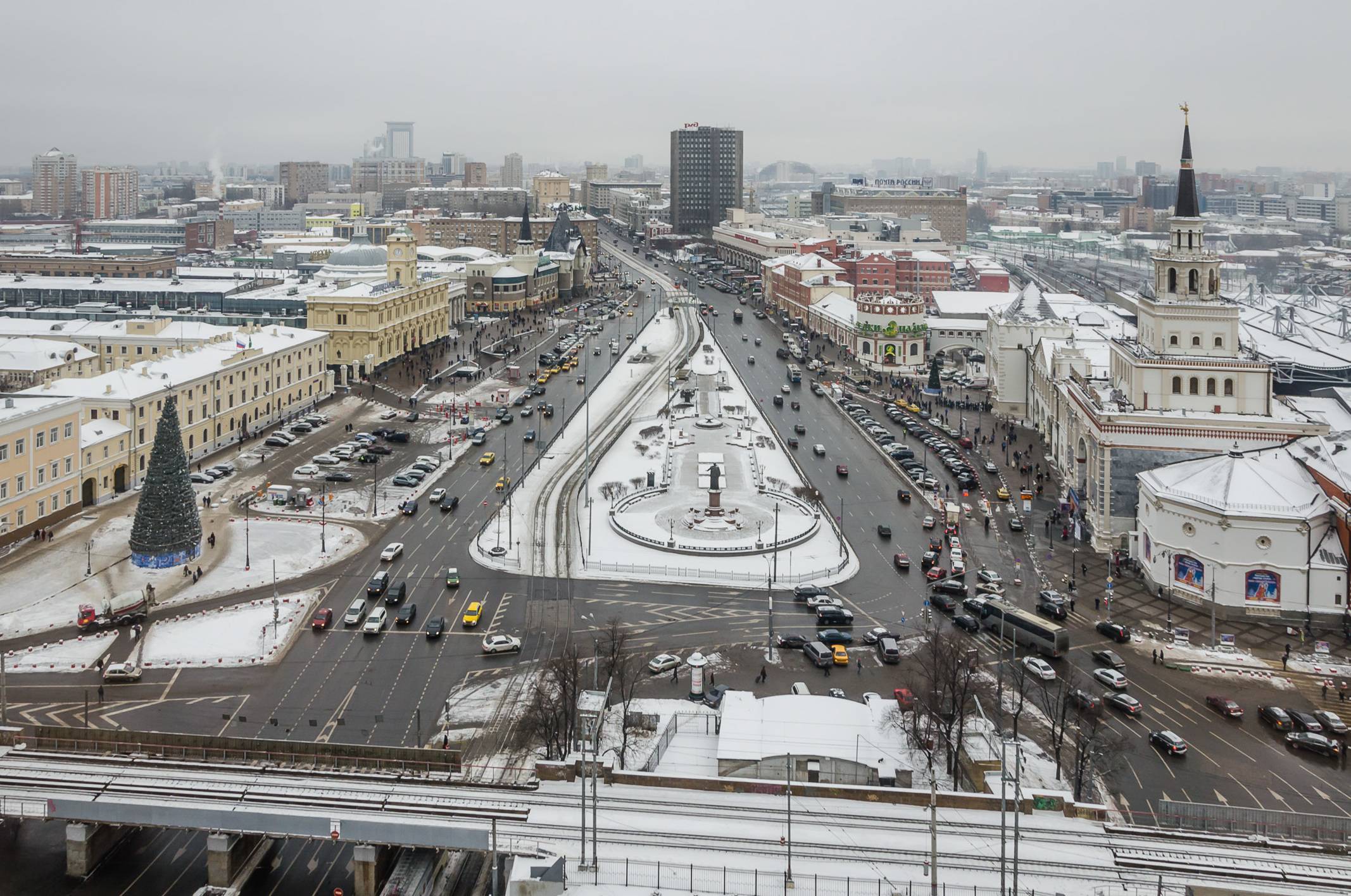
Komsomolskaya Square, view from the Hilton Moscow Leningradskaya

The hotel includes a restaurant, bar, lounge, spa and beauty salon, fitness centre with swimming pool, bureau de change, gift shop, meeting rooms, grand ballroom, and business center. The tower of the Hilton Moscow Leningradskaya Hotel dominates Komsomolskaya Square, with its three railway stations (the Leningradsky, Yaroslavsky and Kazansky) located nearby, along with a main ring road of downtown Moscow.

The hotel joined the Hilton Hotels chain in 2008 after completing a restoration and renovation.

== Architectural and design features ==
In the 1930s, a new architectural style began to take shape in the Soviet Union, later called the "Stalinist". One of the characteristic features directly dictated by the Soviet government were borrowings from the culture of previous epochs. This position of the authorities was not a recommendation, but a must: "serious shortcomings in the mastering [by architects] of the cultural heritage of the past show little attention to the national heritage, to the Russian architectural classics, to national and folk art". This attitude led to the appearance of the Leningradskaya Hotel project, which was implemented.

The influence of medieval Russian architecture was more evident in the exterior design of the building than in other Stalinist skyscrapers. Contemporaries noted that the white-red-gold colouring of the walls "recalls the favourite colours of ancient Russian architecture", the central section is stylistically close to the Kremlin towers. The main entrance is designed in the form of a terem porch. It is decorated with multi-cornered cornices, fanciful pediments, hanging weights and pinnacles. The ribs and emblem of the octagonal spire, the rosettes between the pylons and the orbs on the obelisks are covered in gold.

The stylistic borrowings in the interiors of the hotel are even more significant. Elements of decoration were copied from samples of pre-Petrine palaces and churches. The lift hall, decorated with golden smalt and Shoksha porphyry, is made in the form of an altar niche. The chandeliers in the halls and on the staircases are stylised as paniculars. Motifs from Russian history were used in the decoration of the interiors: on the ground floor, two round medallions are placed above the stairwells. One of them symbolises the Russian victory at the Kulikovo Field, the other the victory at the Battle of the Ice.

== Gallery ==
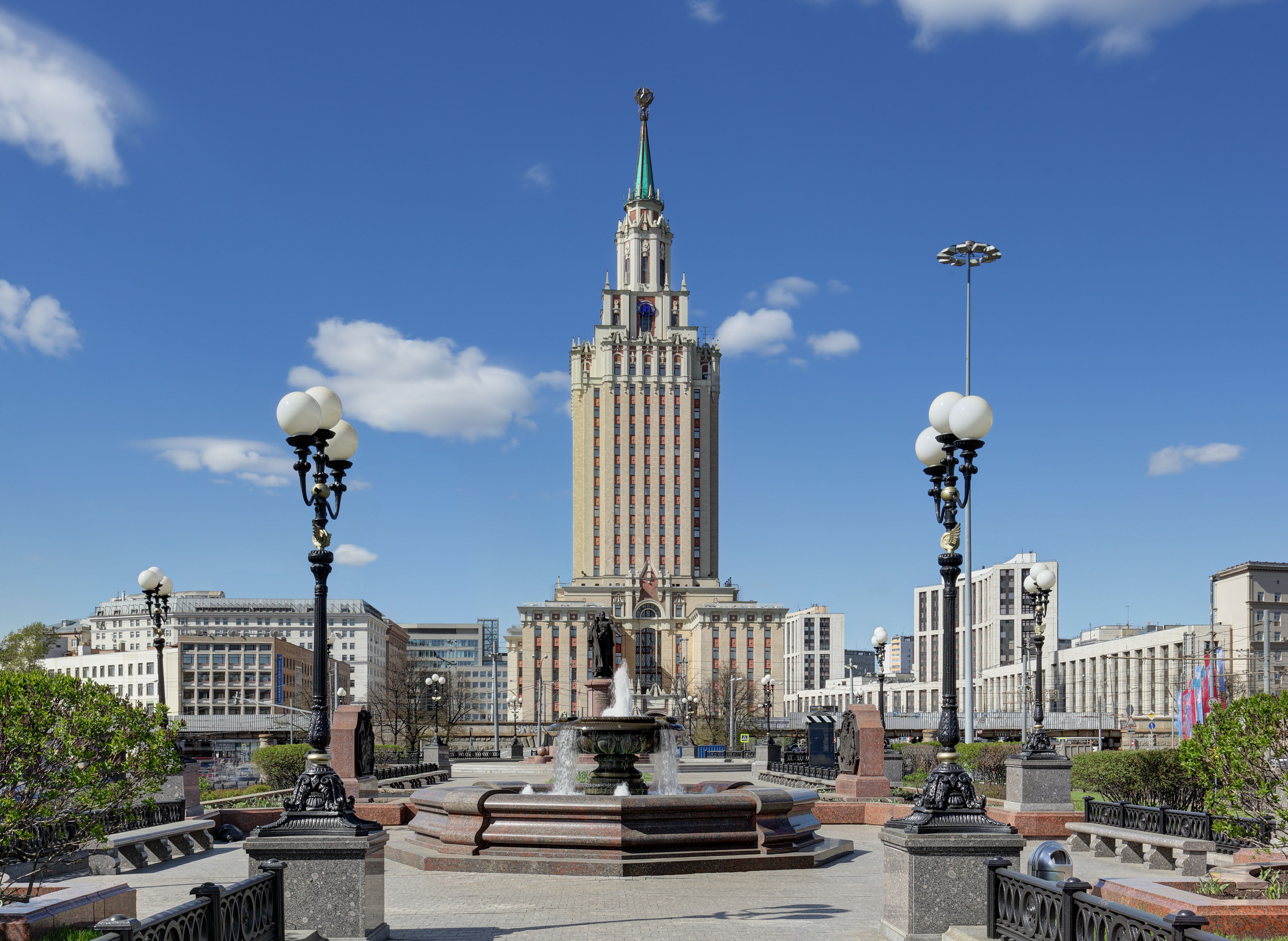
The facade of the hotel (2015)

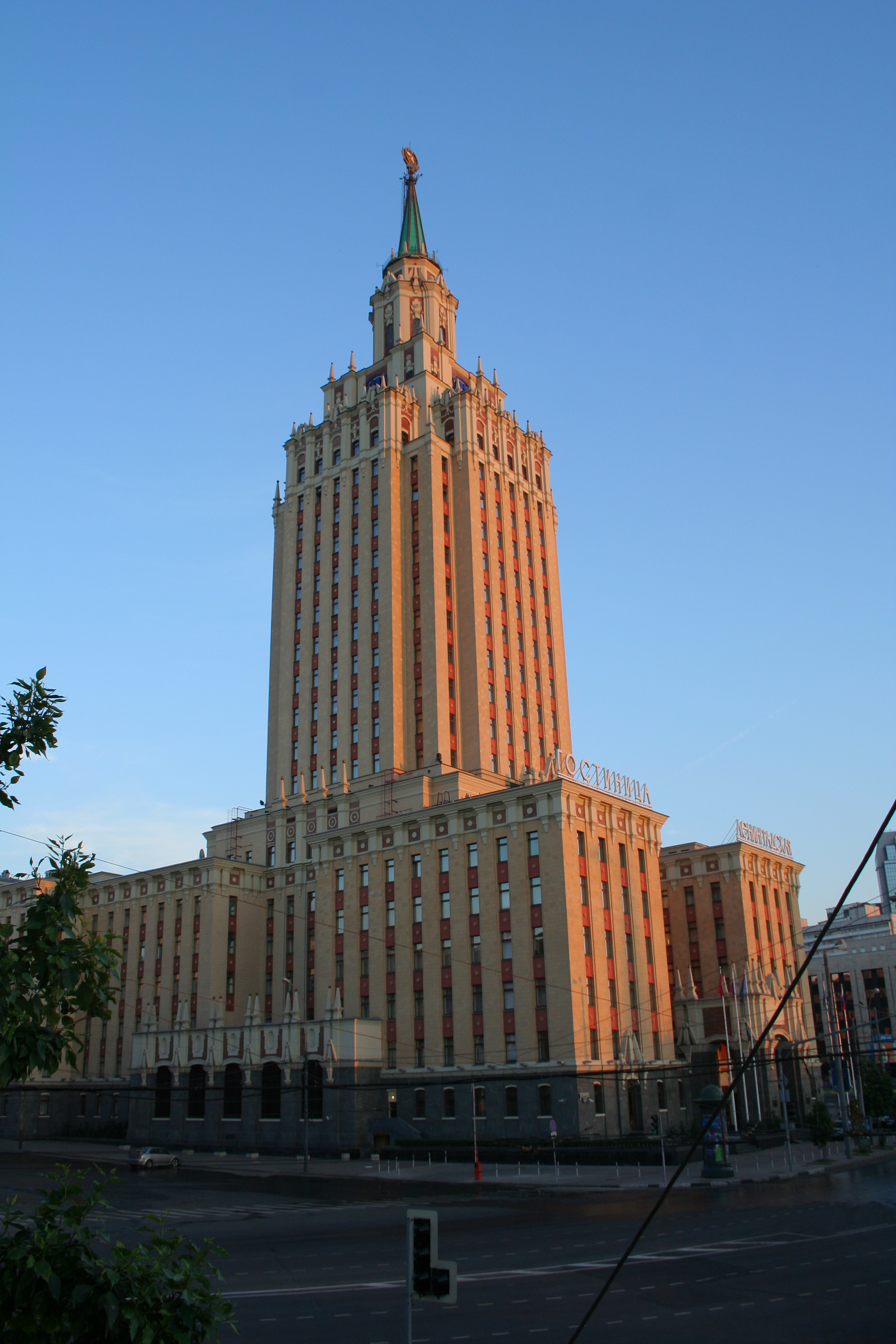
2010

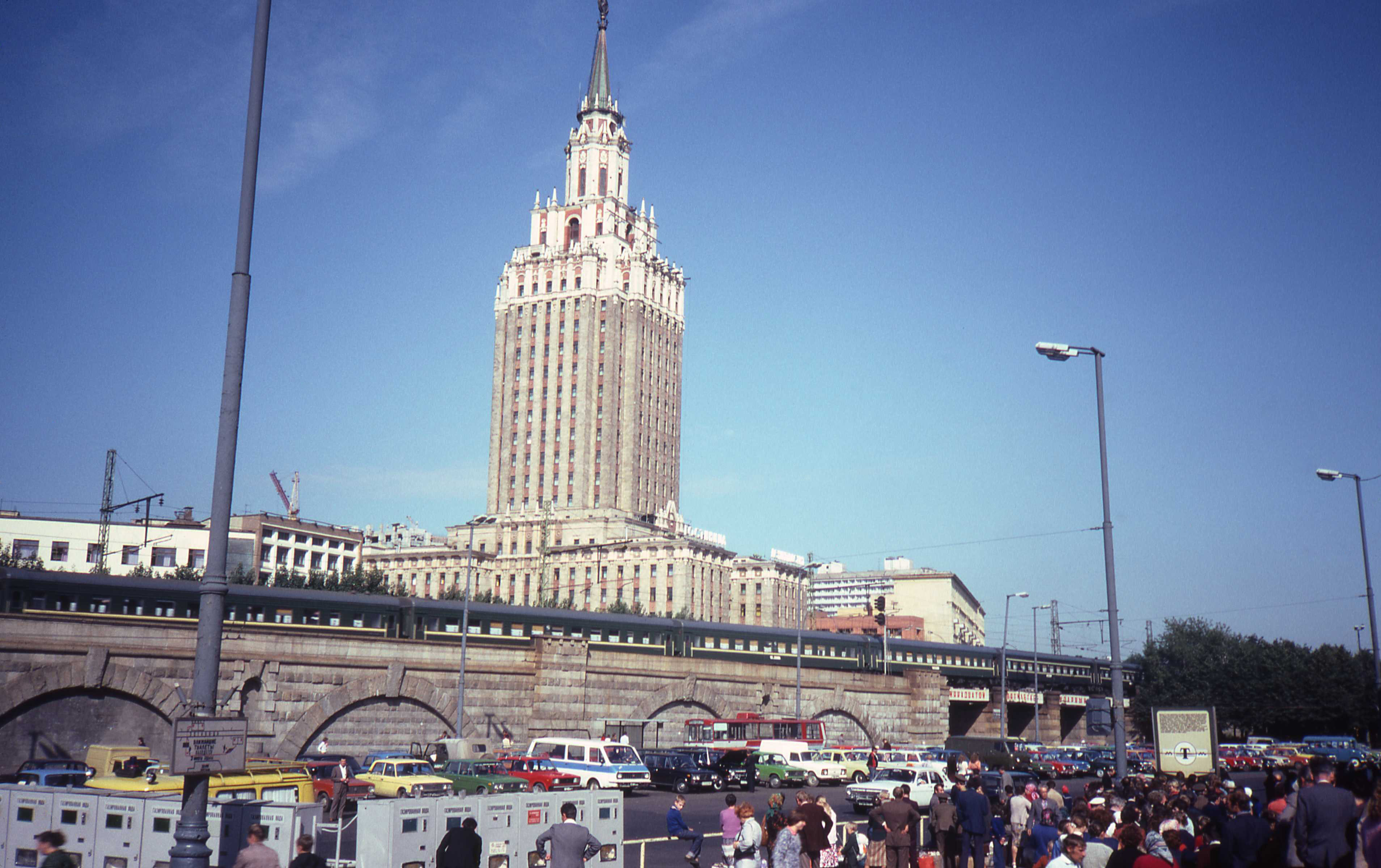
View of the hotel from the side of the Kazan railway station (1982)
