= Komsomolskaya Square (Moscow) =

Square in Moscow, Russia

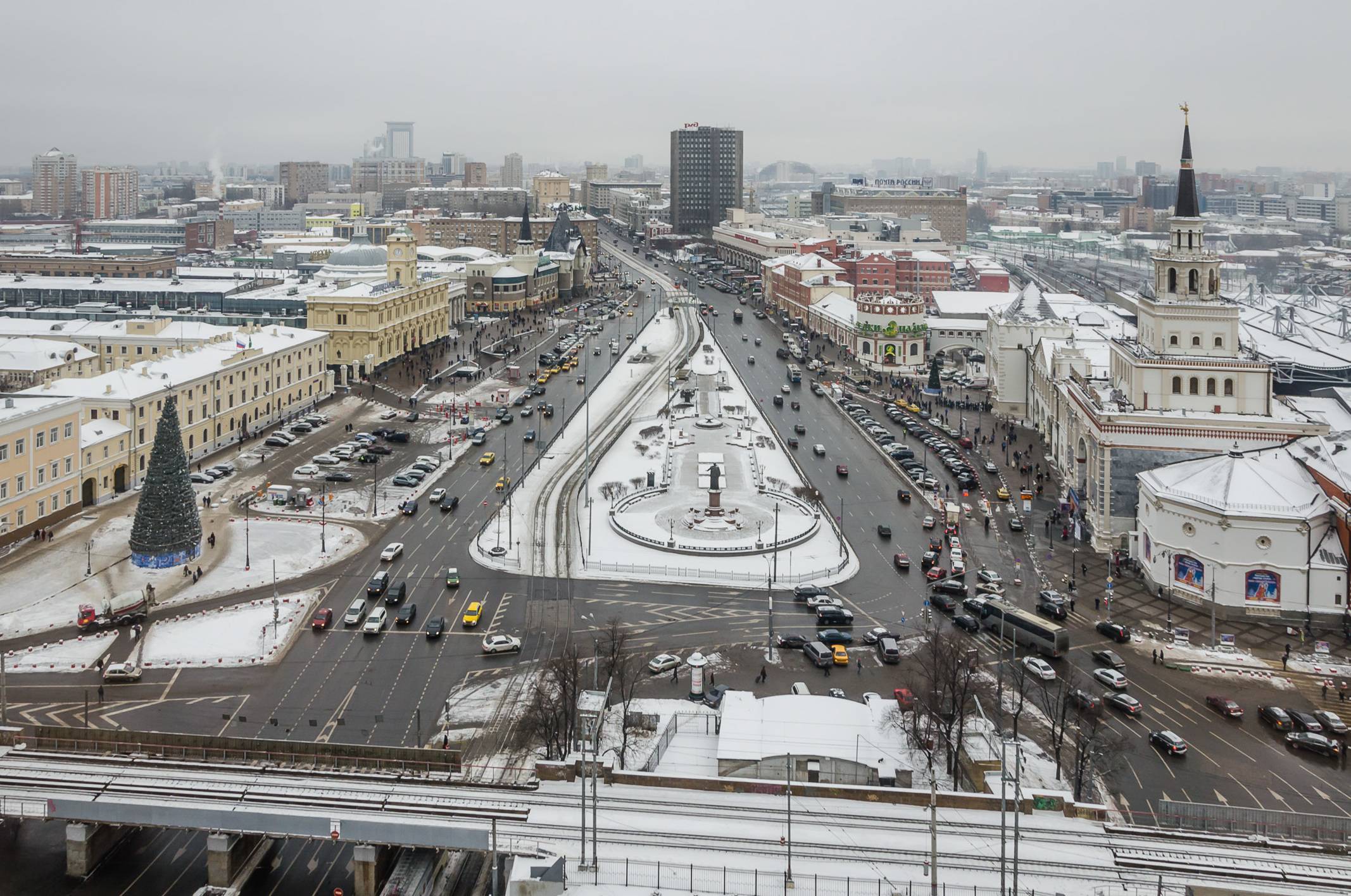
- View of the square from the Leningradskaya Hotel: the Kazansky rail terminal on the right, the two other rail terminals on the left.
- Native name: Комсомольская площадь (Russian)
- Location: Moscow; Central Administrative Okrug; Krasnoselsky District
- Nearest metro station: Komsomolskaya; Komsomolskaya
- Coordinates: 55°46′30″N 37°39′15″E

Komsomolskaya Square, (Note: Russian: Комсомольская площадь, romanized: Komsomólskaya plóshchad, IPA: [kəmsɐˈmolʲskəjə ˈpɫoɕːɪtʲ]) known as Kalanchyovskaya (Note: Russian: Каланчёвская площадь, romanized: Kalanchyóvskaya plóshchad, IPA: [kəɫɐnˈtɕɵfskəjə ˈpɫoɕːɪtʲ]) before 1932, is a square in Moscow, with a blend of revivalist Tsarist and Stalinist architecture. It is informally referred to as Three Station Square (Note: Russian: Площадь трёх вокзалов, romanized: Plóshchad tryokh vokzálov, IPA: [ˈpɫoɕːɪtʲ trʲɵɣ vɐɡˈzaɫəf]) after the three rail termini situated there: Leningradsky, Yaroslavsky, and Kazansky. These stations connect Moscow with Saint Petersburg, northwestern Russia, the Volga region, and Siberia via the Trans-Siberian Railway.

Its origins lay in the construction of the Moscow-Saint Petersburg Railway in the 1840s, when Kalanchyovskoye Field, outside the Garden Ring, was selected as location for the Nicholas Railway Station (later renamed Leningradsky). In 1862 the Yaroslavsky Rail Terminal, a terminus of the Trans-Siberian Railway, was constructed nearby. On the opposite side of the field the Kazansky Rail Terminal was inaugurated two years later. Until 1909, a railway line leading to Kursky Rail Terminal traversed the square; it is now elevated so as not to interfere with street traffic.

During the Soviet period, four other structures were added. Between 1925 and 1926, Alexey Shchusev designed a Constructivist edifice—the Central Club of Railway Workers. The square received its present name, in the honour of the Komsomol (Communist Union of Youth) members, in 1932. A Stalinist skyscraper of the Hilton Moscow Leningradskaya Hotel and a Neoclassical vestibule of the Komsomolskaya-Koltsevaya metro station were completed in the early 1950s. The most recent addition is the Moskovsky department store on the eastern side of the square (1983).

In 2003, at the behest of the Ministry of Transportation, a bronze statue of Pavel Melnikov (1804–1880) was erected on the square. Melnikov was the Russian minister of transportation who oversaw the construction of the first railways in Russia.

Statue of Pavel Melnikov on Komsomolskaya Square, Moscow
