= Ordinarily resident status =

British legal term

Ordinarily resident status is a concept in the law of the United Kingdom which affects entitlement to the National Health Service. It formerly affected taxation, but the concept of ordinary residence was abolished for the purposes of tax years 2013/14 onwards.

== Related concepts ==
Indefinite leave to remain and right of abode are related concepts in immigration law. A person who is a British citizen is not necessarily an ordinary resident in the UK. The policy relates to the Home Office hostile environment policy.

== Guidance ==
The Department of Health and Social Care states:

A person is ordinarily resident if they are living in the United Kingdom:

- lawfully
- voluntarily
- for settled purposes as part of the regular order of their life for the time being, whether for a long or short duration

Pre-settled or settled status for EEA/Swiss nationals [...] is required for EEA/Swiss nationals that were living or studying in the UK on or before 31 December 2020.

Guidance on implementing the overseas visitor hospital charging regulations is provided to assist NHS bodies to make and recover charges for NHS hospital treatment from chargeable overseas visitors.

HM Revenue and Customs issued guidance (booklet HMRC 6) in respect of taxation which included reference to renting, leasing or buying property. This is not mentioned in the NHS guidance.

The concept is also embedded in the National Health Service (Charges to Overseas Visitors) (Scotland) Regulations 1989.

== Law ==
"Ordinarily resident" has not been defined by Act of Parliament. It has been developed in case law. The leading case is R v. Barnet London Borough Council, Ex parte Nilish Shah, which was decided by the House of Lords in 1982. The case was concerned with the meaning of ‘ordinary residence’ as used in the Education Acts. The five appellants were all students who had come to the UK to study. None of them had the right of abode in the United Kingdom. It established these principles:

Ordinary residence is established if there is a regular habitual mode of life in a particular place "for the time being", "whether of short or long duration", the continuity of which has persisted apart from temporary or occasional absences. The residence must be voluntary and adopted for "a settled purpose".

A person can be ordinarily resident in more than one country at the same time. This is not the case in respect of domicile.

Ordinary residence is proven more by evidence of matters capable of objective proof than by evidence as to state of mind.

== Administration in the NHS ==
In October 2016, it was reported that the government had set a target of recovering £500 million a year from overseas visitors treated in NHS hospitals in England, which had been "refined" to £346m for 2017-18, according to the National Audit Office. £289m was collected in 2015–16 and £73m in 2012–13. The NAO reported that only 58% of hospital doctors knew some people were chargeable for NHS healthcare at all. According to Joseph Meirion Thomas, a former cancer specialist at the Royal Marsden Hospital, failure to enforce the charging regulations is costing the British taxpayer £3 billion a year.

== Ireland ==
In the Republic of Ireland there is a similar concept. People who have lived in the Republic for a minimum of one year or intend to live there for a minimum of one year qualify for help with prescription charges.

== See also ==
- Immigration health surcharge
- Habitual residence
- Habitual residence test
