= Hannah v Peel =

Hannah v Peel, 1 K.B. 509, was a 1945 English legal case decided in the King's Bench Division of the High Court. The court held that the owner of the locus in quo does not have a superior right to possession over the finder of lost property that is unattached to the land.

== Facts ==
The defendant, Major Hugh E. E. Peel, owned Gwernhaylod House, Overton-on-Dee, Shropshire. He bought it in December 1938, but did not move in, and shortly after the Second World War broke out, the house was requisitioned for military use.

In August 1940, the plaintiff, Lance-Corporal Duncan Hannah of the Royal Artillery, was staying in the house on army business. During his stay, LCpl Hannah found a brooch on top of a window frame. From its dirty, cobwebby state the brooch seemed to have been there for a long time. LCpl Hannah consulted his commanding officer who advised him to hand it to the police, which Hannah did.

Nobody claimed the brooch, and in August 1942, the police returned it to Major Peel. Peel then sold it for £66.

LCpl Hannah asked Maj Peel for this money. Peel offered Hannah a reward, but he refused and said he wanted the brooch or its cash value instead. Maj Peel, because he owned the building in which the brooch was found, claimed it was his. LCpl Hannah brought the case to dispute this.

== Judgment ==
Birkett J found that Hannah's claim to the brooch outweighed Peel's.
