= Shoksha quartzite =

Decorative stone mineral

Coordinates: 61°29′N 35°2′E

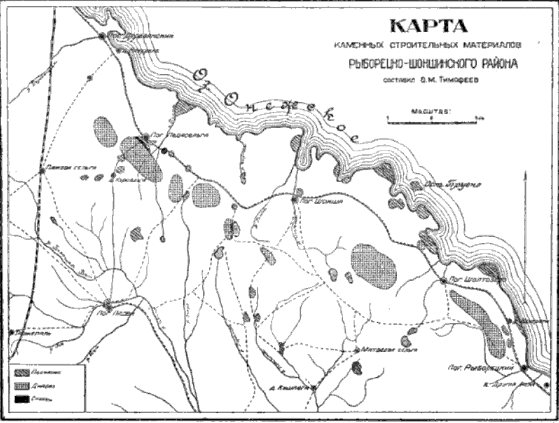
Map of Shoksha district quarries, 1921. Shoksha is in the middle; the quartzite quarry is on the east bank of the Shoksha bay of Lake Onega directly northwards of Shoksha

Shoksha quartzite, Shoksha porphyry, or crimson quartzite (Russian: малиновый кварцит, literally "raspberry quartzite") is quartzose sandstone of deep red color variously described as purple or crimson resembling true porphyry. It is named after Shoksha, Karelia, a village in Prionezhsky District, Karelia, Russia, close to its deposits. Currently it is mined mostly in the nearby miner's settlement of Kvartzitny by Lake Onega. Its shades of red color is due to iron oxides.

This durable and expensive material was used for decoration of many Russian palaces, cathedrals and sculptures.

Scrap crimson quartzite is of various utility in Russia. Due to its high heat resistance it is used for fireplaces in banyas and saunas. Its durability makes it suitable for pavements. Due to its aesthetic qualities it is used minor decorations, etc.

In Soviet times the major usage of Shoksha quartzite was in glass industry, for grinding balls and linings used in grinders for grinding mineral components for glass.

In 1981 the estimated volume of the Shiksha quartzite field was over 1.3 million cubic meters.

== Notable uses ==
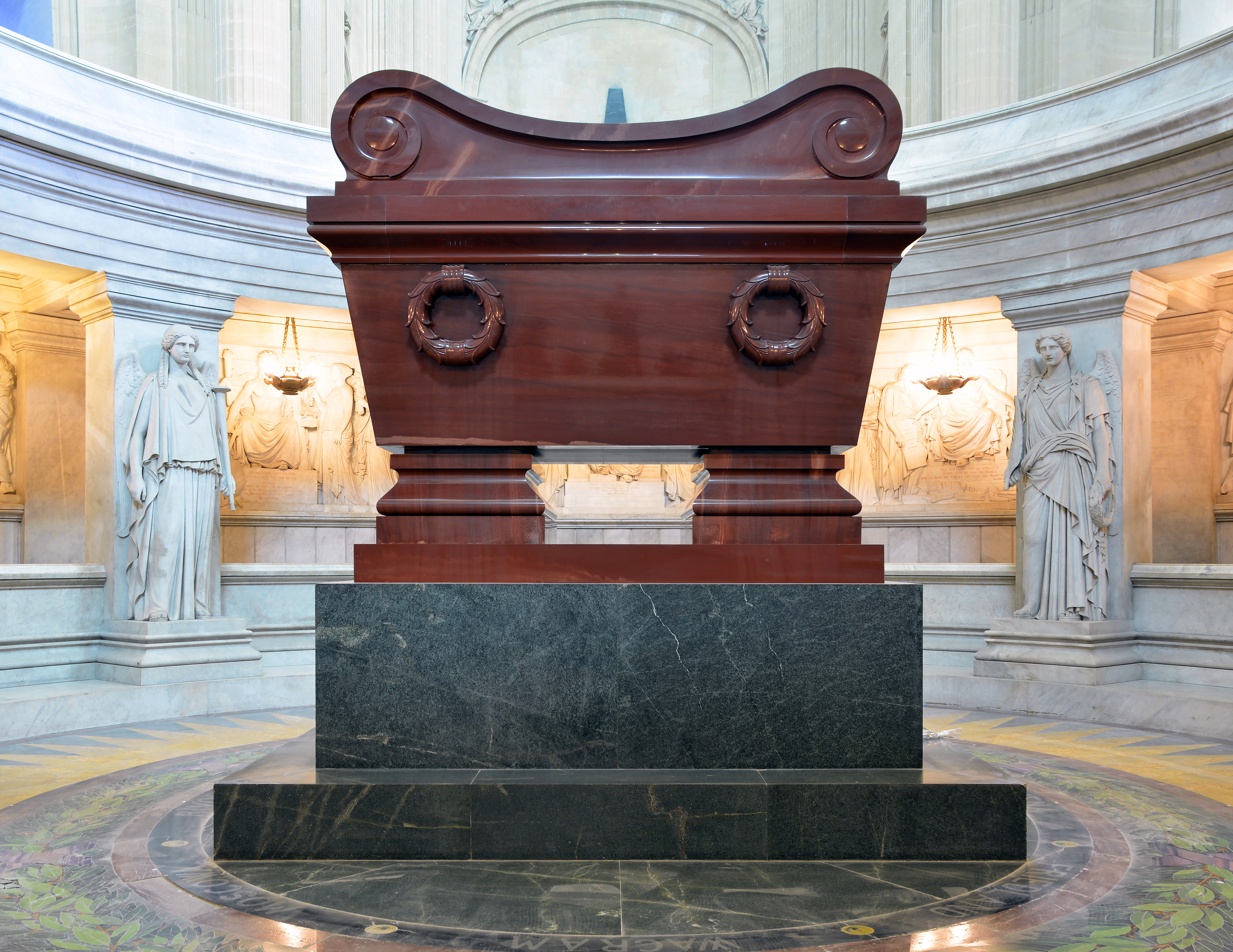
Sarcophagus of Napoleon

- Napoleon's tomb
- Decorations of the lift hall of Hilton Moscow Leningradskaya, one of "Stalinist skyscrapers"
- Several elements of Saint Isaac's Cathedral, including details of the bust to the cathedral's architect Auguste de Montferrand
- Friezes in the main façade of Saint Michael's Castle
- Pedestal of the Tsar Nicholas I monument
- Letters "LENIN" and some other elements of Lenin's Mausoleum
