= Douez v Facebook =

Douez v Facebook Inc.
- Supreme Court of Canada

Hearing: November 4, 2016 Judgment: June 23, 2017
- Citations: 2017 SCC 33, [2017] 1 S.C.R. 751
- Prior history: Judgement for Facebook Inc. in the British Columbia Court of Appeal.
- Ruling: The appeal should be allowed.

Court membership
- Chief Justice: Beverley McLachlin; Puisne Justices: Rosalie Abella, Michael Moldaver, Andromache Karakatsanis, Richard Wagner, Clément Gascon, Suzanne Côté, Russell Brown, Malcolm Rowe

Reasons given
- Plurality: Karakatsanis, Wagner and Gascon JJ, joined by Abella, J.
- Dissent: McLachlin C.J., Moldaver and Côté JJ.

Douez v Facebook Inc., 2017 SCC 33 is a Supreme Court of Canada case which analyzes the enforceability of forum selection clauses in consumer facing contracts.

== Background ==
In 2011, Facebook introduced a “sponsored stories” feature which used the name and photo of Facebook users to advertise products and companies to other users. Facebook is headquartered in California, while the representative plaintiff resided in British Columbia. The plaintiff alleged that the use of her name and likeness without obtaining prior consent violated British Columbia’s provincial Privacy Act and sought to certify her class. Facebook’s terms and conditions included a clause reading:

"You will resolve any claim, cause of action or dispute (claim) you have with us arising out of or relating to this Statement or Facebook exclusively in a state or federal court located in Santa Clara County. The laws of the State of California will govern this Statement, as well as any claim that might arise between you and us, without regard to conflict of law provisions. You agree to submit to the personal jurisdiction of the courts located in Santa Clara County, California for purpose of litigating all such claims."

Per section 4 of British Columbia's Privacy Act, any actions must be heard and determined by the province's Supreme Court. In a preliminary motion, Facebook requested a stay on the basis that the above clause indicated that any disputes had to be resolved in California. The Chambers Judge of the British Columbia Supreme Court declined to enforce the forum selection clause as it was overridden by the Privacy Act. The British Columbia Court of Appeal reversed the judgement. The Court found the forum selection clause was enforceable, and the plaintiff failed to demonstrate a strong cause not to enforce it.

== Issues ==
- Did the provincial Privacy Act override the forum selection clause?
- Should the forum selection clause be enforced?

== Holding ==
The Privacy Act provision was not sufficiently specific to override the forum selection clause. In addition to factors traditionally considered under the Pompey Test, courts should also take into account public policy considerations related to gross inequality of bargaining power between the parties and the nature of the rights at stake. Enforceability of foreign selection clauses in contracts may be challenged where constitutional and quasi-constitutional rights are involved.

== Reasons of the Court ==
The plurality judgement was given by Karakatsanis, Wagner, and Gascon JJ.

Appeal allowed. The majority acknowledged the importance of forum selection clause for business efficacy. Where there is no legislation to the contrary, the common law test for forum selection clauses in Z.I. Pompey Industrie v. ECU-Line N.V will apply, and the analysis will remain separate from the Court Jurisdiction and Proceedings Transfer Act (CJPTA). Section 4 of the Privacy Act was not clear and specific enough to override the forum selection clause.

The first step of the Pompey test requires the party seeking a stay to demonstrate that the clause is valid, clear, enforceable, and applies to the cause of action before the court. If the party succeeds, the onus shifts to the plaintiff who must show strong cause why the court should not enforce the forum selection clause and stay the action. At this second step of the test, a court must consider all the circumstances, including the convenience of the parties, fairness between the parties and the interests of justice. Courts may also consider public policy. Forum selection clauses may be interpreted differently, depending on whether the contract is based on a commercial or consumer relationship. Courts may consider the gross inequality of bargaining power between the parties and the nature of the rights at stake in their public policy analysis.

On the first step of the Pompey test, the Court found that the forum selection clause was enforceable. However, the plaintiff met her burden in establishing strong cause not to enforce the clause under the second section of the Pompey test. The court recognized “gross inequality” in bargaining power, and a lack of choice as to whether to accept the terms of use. Canadian courts have a greater interest in adjudicating cases impinging on constitutional and quasi-constitutional rights. Public policy concerns weighed in favour of a strong cause.

They also considered two secondary factors. The domestic court was better placed to assess legislative intent. Only a domestic court’s interpretation of the Privacy Act would provide clarity and certainty about the scope of rights to others in the province. Further, the Court compared the expense and inconvenience for the parties should the claim be adjudicated in British Columbia as opposed to California.

Per Abella, J.

Justice Abella found the clause unenforceable under the first step of the Pompey Test. Due to the nature of the contract, consumers are unable to bargain with the company regarding the terms. Clauses which impair consumer’s access to remedies should be scrutinized more intensively. She found that both the elements of inequality of bargaining power and unfairness were met, rendering the contract unconscionable.

She found the public policy concerns were also significant as it dealt with the right to privacy. The statute recognized that privacy rights are entitled to protection in British Columbia by judges of the British Columbia Supreme Court. Enforcing a forum selection clause in a consumer contract that would deprive a party of access to a statutorily mandated court would be contrary to public policy.

== See also ==
- Rudder v Microsoft Corporation, (1999), 2 CPR (4th) 474
- Uber Technologies Inc. v Heller, 2020 SCC 16
