= Service ex juris =

Service ex juris is legal notice of an upcoming proceeding given to a defendant who resides outside of the jurisdiction of the court. Rules of service ex juris are typically found in the rules of civil procedure and are limited by subject matter, the strength of the connection between the subject and the jurisdiction, and the doctrine of forum non conveniens.

== See also ==
- Long-arm jurisdiction
