= Habitual residence test =

Eligibility test for social security benefits

The Habitual Residence Test is used by the United Kingdom and the Republic of Ireland to determine eligibility for social security benefits.

In both countries a right to reside in the Common Travel Area counts for the purpose of this test.

Habitual residence is not defined in legislation. The term has repeatedly been considered in caselaw.

For many benefits there is also a test of presence in the country.

== United Kingdom ==
The test was introduced in 1994. It required close ties to the United Kingdom and intention to settle in the UK. It was revised in May 2004 to include a ‘right to reside’ requirement, based on directives of the European Union regarding right of residence. Provisions regarding right to reside include conducting business, working or looking for work, being a student, or having sufficient resources to be self-supporting.

=== European Commission objections ===
In May 2013 the European Commission after a long dispute with the UK over the matter decided to take a case to the European Court of Justice with respect to denial of welfare benefits to European citizens who fail the test. The Commission alleges that the UK test does not conform to European directives. The UK, which, on the basis of failure to pass the test of right to reside, rejects over half of the applications of European Union citizens to the UK for benefits, has announced it will contest the matter.

== Republic of Ireland ==
Only the person claiming benefits has to satisfy the test. From 2014 a further condition was added - that the person must remain habitually resident in the State.

== See also ==
- Habitual residence
- Ordinarily resident status
