= The Bremen v. Zapata Off-Shore Co. =

The Bremen v. Zapata Off-Shore Company
- Supreme Court of the United States

Argued March 21, 1972 Decided June 12, 1972
- Full case name: The Bremen, et al. v. Zapata Off-Shore Company
- Citations: 407 U.S. 1 (more) 92 S. Ct. 1907; 32 L. Ed. 2d 513

Holding
- The forum-selection clause, which was a vital part of the towing contract, is binding on the parties unless respondent can meet the heavy burden of showing that its enforcement would be unreasonable, unfair, or unjust.

Court membership
- Chief Justice Warren E. Burger Associate Justices William O. Douglas · William J. Brennan Jr. Potter Stewart · Byron White; Thurgood Marshall · Harry Blackmun; Lewis F. Powell Jr. · William Rehnquist

Case opinions
- Majority: Burger, joined by Brennan, Stewart, White, Marshall, Blackmun, Powell, Rehnquist
- Concurrence: White
- Dissent: Douglas

The Bremen v. Zapata Off-Shore Company, 407 U.S. 1 (1972), was a United States Supreme Court case in which the Court considered when a U.S. court should uphold the validity of a contractual forum selection clause.

The parties had entered into an agreement for a drilling rig to be towed from Louisiana to Italy, which included a clause stating that disputes would be settled by a court in England. When a storm forced the towing party to make land in Tampa, Florida, the other party sued there. After the lower courts refused to uphold the forum selection clause, the Supreme Court held that it was enforceable unless the party seeking to avoid it could meet the high burden of showing it to be unreasonable or unjust.

== Rationale ==
In the light of present-day commercial realities and expanding international trade, [the Supreme Court] conclude[d] that the forum clause should control absent a strong showing that it should be set aside. Although their opinions are not altogether explicit, it seems reasonably clear that the District Court and the Court of Appeals placed the burden on Unterweser to show that London would be a more convenient forum than Tampa, although the contract expressly resolved that issue. The correct approach would have been to enforce the forum clause specifically unless Zapata could clearly show that enforcement would be unreasonable and unjust, or that the clause was invalid for such reasons as fraud or overreaching. Accordingly, the case must be remanded for reconsideration.
