= Conflict of contract laws =

Aspect of law

In the conflict of laws, the validity and effect of a contract with one or more foreign law elements will be decided by reference to the so-called "proper law" of the contract.

== History ==
In England, until the middle of the 19th century, the courts generally applied the lex loci contractus as the proper law.

== Proper law ==
=== Express selection ===
In England, as of 1 October 1983, when the parties express a clear intention in a choice-of-law clause, this is generally the proper law.

=== Implied selection ===
In England, as of 1 October 1983, when the parties have not used express words, their intention may be inferred from the terms and nature of the contract, and from the general circumstances of the case.

=== Closest and most real connection ===
In Mount Albert Borough Council v Australasian etc Assurance Society Ltd, it was held that, in default, the court has to impute an intention by asking, as just and reasonable persons, which law the parties ought to, or would, have intended to nominate if they had thought about it when they were making the contract. But see The Assunzione.

=== Dépeçage ===
Some legal systems provide that a contract may be governed by more than one law. This concept is referred to as dépeçage.
