= Proper law =

The doctrine of the proper law is applied in the choice of law stage of a lawsuit involving the conflict of laws.

When the jurisdiction is in dispute, one or more state laws will be relevant to the decision-making process. If the laws are the same, this will cause no problems, but if there are substantive differences, the choice of which law to apply will produce a different judgment. Each state, therefore, produces a set of rules to guide the choice of law, and one of the most significant rules is that the law to be applied in any given situation will be the proper law. This is the law that seems to have the closest and most real connection to the facts of the case, and so has the best claim to be applied. The term "proper" refers back to the older English sense as being "proper to". In other words, the law proper to the contract or the contractual term or issue involved.

All laws, to a greater or lesser extent, are reflections of the public policies of the state that enacted them. The more important the policy to the society, the greater the claim of the relevant law to be applied. Thus, if laws exist to protect citizens, the law of the place where loss or damage is sustained might have a strong claim to apply: e.g. in a traffic accident, two cars collide because of faulty maintenance and both drivers are injured – the local laws exist to provide some degree of protection for all those who use the roads in that state, setting minimum standards for the design and maintenance of vehicles, specifying what levels of insurance should be carried, setting the minimum age and qualifications for the right to drive, etc.

But the problem with accepting the claim of anyone state to have its law apply is that the result may be somewhat arbitrary. So, in the example given, if neither driver had a residence in the state, and the cars were both maintained outside the state, the laws of other states may have an equal or better claim to apply. The advantage of the proper law approach is that it builds in flexibility rather than offering a mechanical rule. Suppose that there is a contract between an Italian company and an English partnership for the sale of goods made in Greece to be shipped from Belgium on a ship flying the flag of Panama to a Swedish port. Adopting a rule such as the lex loci contractus, i.e. apply the law of the place where the contract was made, might actually select a law having no other connection with the substance of the bargain made by the parties. Similarly, picking the lex loci solutionis, i.e. the law of the place where the contract is to be performed, may prove to be equally irrelevant, assuming that there is only one place where performance is to occur: in the example, there is manufacture in Greece, delivery to Belgium, loading in Belgium, carriage on the high seas, and unloading in Sweden. So, if the contract does not make an express selection of the law to apply (see the choice of law clause), the parties are deemed to have chosen to be bound by the law with which the contract has the closest and most real connection.

The general rule is that the proper law is the primary system of law that governs most aspects of the factual situation giving rise to the dispute. This does not imply that all the aspects of the factual circumstances are necessarily governed by the same system of law, but there is a strong presumption that this will be the case (see characterization). So, the process of legal analysis undertaken by the courts in each case identifies all the facts that have a specific geographical connection, e.g. where the parties reside or their businesses operate, where an agreement was made, where relevant actions were performed, etc. Once all the relevant connecting factors have been identified, the law of the state that has the greatest number of connections will be the proper law. In the event of a tie, the connecting factors which relate to performance will be given greater weight than the connecting factors affect form. In most cases, this weighting will produce a clear winner.
