= Borrowing statute =

Within the United States, a statute of limitations is typically deemed to be a procedural law, meaning that a state will ordinarily apply its own statute of limitations to any case that is filed within its courts. A borrowing statute, is a statute under which a U.S. state may "borrow" a shorter statute of limitations for a cause of action arising in another jurisdiction.

== Purpose and applications ==
The purpose of borrowing statutes is to prevent plaintiffs from engaging in forum shopping in order to find the longest available statute of limitations.

A borrowing statute is applied where a plaintiff sues in a state different from the state where the act that is the basis of the lawsuit occurred. For example, if a person is injured in a car accident in state A, that person may sue the at-fault driver in state B (presuming state B has jurisdiction, usually because it is the driver's home state). If the state in which the lawsuit is filed has a borrowing statute, that state will usually apply the other state's statute of limitations, as long as it is a shorter statute of limitations than that of the borrowing state.

In determining which state is the one in which the cause of action arose, states will apply various choice of law principles, which may be very complicated. States that do not have borrowing statutes may apply their own statutes of limitation to most or all lawsuits filed in their state courts, although at times they may apply an out-of-state limitations period based upon a choice of law analysis.

In some states, the borrowing statute will only be applied if the plaintiff was not a resident of that state at the time the cause of action accrued; in others, it will only apply if the defendant was not a resident. Some states limit the use of borrowing statutes to specific types of cases, such as breach of contract actions.
