= Habitual residence =

Legal standard in conflict of laws

In conflict of laws, habitual residence is the standard used to determine the law which should be applied to determine a given legal dispute or entitlement. It can be contrasted with the law on domicile, traditionally used in common law jurisdictions to do the same thing.

Habitual residence is determined based on the totality of circumstances which may include both future intention and past experience. There is normally only one habitual residence where the individual usually resides and routinely returns to after visiting other places. It is the geographical place considered "home" for a reasonably significant period of time.

== Description ==
In conflict of laws there are three personal connecting factors that help courts determine which law should apply to a particular dispute or issue. These are nationality, domicile, and habitual residence. Habitual residence is the newest concept of the three and is becoming a more commonly used factor than domicile in many common law jurisdictions and within statutes and international conventions.

=== General principles ===
There is no internationally agreed upon definition of habitual residence. Even within specific jurisdictions, many courts have yet to fully define the term. Numerous domestic statutes and conventions that use habitual residence, such as the Hague Conference on Private International Law, also do not define the term. This may be to avoid "the rigidity associated with the alternative concepts of domicile and nationality". The lack of definition means that habitual residence is generally left to judicial interpretation by the courts in whichever jurisdiction uses it as a connecting factor.

Although there is no definition, habitual residence can generally be considered something less than domicile but something more than simple residence: a midpoint between the two. Previous definitions suggested that habitual residence required someone to be physically present in a place for a certain period of time to be considered habitual resident in that place. However, many scholars and courts have disagreed with this and believe that there are a number of factors that are to be considered in determining someone's habitual residence; while the amount of time spent in a given place is one of those factors, it is not determinative. Other factors that may be relevant depend on the jurisdiction; for example in the European Union, continuity and durability of the residence are considered in addition to the duration.

=== Application ===
Domestically, the use and application of habitual residence depends on which states are involved in the dispute. Each jurisdiction may use habitual residence in different instances. Therefore, habitual residence can have a significant impact on a person when it is the sole factor, or a factor, used to determine which law applies to a particular dispute or issue. A person's habitual residence could affect marital disputes, land-related disputes, succession, and other types of disputes or matters, depending on the rules of the states involved.

=== International Conventions ===
The concept of habitual residence is used in a number of international conventions, beginning with the Hague Convention on Civil Procedure of 14 November 1896. Since then it has become the basis of a number of other conventions either to complement or supplant the traditional connecting factor of domicile. One example of this is in the Convention on International Child Abduction, which uses habitual residence throughout to determine the applicable law in an actual or potential child abduction case.

=== Comparison with nationality ===
Habitual residence may also be more discriminating that the test of nationality or lex patriae in that the connection is to a specific location within a state rather than to the country of nationality, which may contain several subnational jurisdictions (such as states or provinces). Hence, where a country contains more than one legal system, the residence must determine which of the several possible laws might apply (e.g. in the United States, which of the laws of the U.S. states is to be applied). A supranational example of this selection process is contained in Article 19 of the Rome Convention:

States with more than one legal system
1. Where a State comprises several territorial units each of which has its own rules of law in respect of contractual obligations, each territorial unit shall be considered as a country for the purposes of identifying the law applicable under this Convention.
2. A State within which different territorial units have their own rules of law in respect of contractual obligations shall not be bound to apply this Convention to conflicts solely between the laws of such units.

=== Comparison with domicile ===
Habitual residence is fact-dependent; it cannot be a purely legal concept and there are different views about the factual situations that it is supposed to denote. Much of the case law on habitual residence suggests it is purely objective, seeking evidence of physical presence over a considerable period of time. However, there is an argument to be made that habitual residence has a subjective element like domicile since intention may, at times, be a factor in considering an individual's habitual residence. This is particularly true if habitual residence it is considered synonymous with ordinary residence, which requires an analysis of a person's "ordinary mode of living". However, it is not universally accepted that habitual residence and ordinary residence are the same, making it debatable if habitual residence has subjective elements like ordinary residence.

In comparison, to establish a domicile of choice, it is necessary to have a clear factual base in one state and that must be accompanied by an animus semper manendi (Latin: intention to reside indefinitely). Although it is not so difficult to produce evidence that an individual has established a home in a state, it is very difficult to prove that someone has no intention of ever establishing a home in another state. Therefore, the test for habitual residence is less demanding without this subjective element of intention. The court focuses on the past experience of the individual and not so much on future intention.

However, it may be more difficult to determine where a person has a habitual residence if they are constantly on the move with no real or continuing connection with any of the countries through which they have passed. This could be resolved by reference to the individual's intention, which is well-defined in the case law for the purposes of domicile, but not for the purposes habitual residence.

The subjective element required for domicile is the most important difference when comparing the factor with habitual residence. This could be either positive or negative, depending on the situation.

== In specific jurisdictions ==
=== Canada ===
The use of the term "habitual residence" in Canadian law stems from the Hague Convention on Private International Law. At common law, a person's habitual residence is a question of fact determined on a case by case basis. Canadian courts have not provided a clear definition on the term; however, the word "habitual" qualifying the term "residence" suggests that more than just physical presence is required to find someone to be a habitual residence of a place. Also required is "a minimum connection with some form of dwelling" and "a stay of some duration". Duration of time, while important as a factor to consider, is not determinative. Evidence of present intention to reside is also a factor to be considered.

In Canadian legislation, residence is becoming more common as the primary personal connecting factor instead of domicile, following the lead of international conventions like the Hague Convention. Habitual residence specifically is also becoming more common in legislation as drafters use the term as the primary connecting factor. One example is in the Federal Divorce Act which uses a one year period of habitual residence as the basis for which a court in a province has a jurisdiction to hear and determine a divorce proceeding.

==== Interpretation of habitual residence in the Hague Convention ====
When determining habitual residence pursuant to Article 3 of the Hague Convention on the Civil Aspects of International Child Abduction, courts are to apply the hybrid approach outlined by the Supreme Court of Canada in Office of the Children's Lawyer v Balev, 2018 SCC 16 which places emphasis on the best interests of the child. There is no specific test for defining habitual residence under the Convention, rather, a non-exhaustive list of potentially relevant factors. The importance of the factors may vary depending on the child's age. The Court is not to focus solely on parental intention or the child's acclimatization, but to all relevant considerations. Factors to be considered include the child's links to and circumstances in Country A, the circumstances of the move between countries, and the child's links to and circumstances in country B. Other factors suggested by the majority include the nationality of the child, as well as the duration, regularity, conditions and reasons for the child's stay in a jurisdiction.

==== Ontario ====
In Ontario the legislature has started to use and define habitual residence in certain statutes. For example, habitual residence is defined in the Children's Law Reform Act . Under the act, a child will be considered habitually resident in the last place where the child resided with both parents; or if the parents are living separate and apart, with one parent under a separation agreement, consent, or acquiescence of the other, or under a court order; or with a person other than a parent on a permanent basis or for a significant period of time.

==== British Columbia ====
In British Columbia, habitual residence is now used in a number of statutes, specifically in provincial family law statutes. For example, British Columbia's Family Law Act uses habitual residence throughout the act as the only connecting factor and has similar wording to Ontarios Children's law Reform Act in determining where a child is habitually resident.

==== Quebec ====
The Quebec Superior Court has defined habitually as meaning "almost constantly, generally". Habitual residence is the place one regularly, normally or customarily lives. Habitual residence requires more durable ties than mere residence; merely passing through a place is not sufficient to establish habitual residence.

In the context of International Child Abductions, the Quebec Court of Appeal outlined that determining habitual residence requires focussing on the reality of the child not the parents; considering the duration of time necessary for the child to develop ties and be integrated into the new environment; the child's real and active connection with their place of residence. To be habitual, the residence must have a certain degree of continuity, but, there is no minimum period necessary to establish the acquisition of the new habitual residence.

==== Manitoba ====
Manitoba has abolished any common law use of domicile and habitual residence by codifying it through The Domicile and Habitual Residence Act. Under the act habitual residence is to be determined under the act and not by the common law. Under the act the basis for determining the habitual residence of each person is set out in section 8(1) of the act which states the following:

8(1) The domicile and habitual residence of each person is in the state and a subdivision thereof in which that person's principal home is situated and in which that person intends to reside.

(2) For the purposes of subsection (1), unless a contrary intention is shown, a person is presumed to intend to reside indefinitely in the state and subdivision thereof in which that person's principal home is situated.

== See also ==
- Ordinarily resident status
- Habitual residence test
