= Conflict of laws =

Law for cases in multiple jurisdictions

Conflict of laws, also known as private international law, is the set of rules or laws a jurisdiction applies to a case, transaction, or other occurrence that has connections to more than one jurisdiction. This body of law deals with three broad topics: jurisdiction, rules regarding when it is appropriate for a court to hear such a case; foreign judgments, dealing with the rules by which a court in one jurisdiction mandates compliance with a ruling of a court in another jurisdiction; and choice of law, which addresses the question of which substantive laws will be applied in such a case. These issues can arise in any private law context, but they are especially prevalent in contract law and tort law.

In practice, conflict-of-laws issues also arise in international arbitration, particularly in jurisdictions that maintain distinct procedural regimes for domestic and international proceedings. Academic commentary has noted that, in dualist systems such as Colombia, the characterization of an arbitration as domestic or international may affect the applicable procedural framework and the grounds for annulment, with international awards being subject to a more limited review focused on fundamental due process guarantees and international public policy rather than substantive reconsideration of the merits.

== Scope and terminology ==
The term conflict of laws is primarily used in the United States and Canada, though it has also come into use in the United Kingdom. Elsewhere, the term private international law is commonly used, for example in Switzerland, the Federal Act on Private International Law (PILA) regulates which law should be applied when a dispute has connections with more than one jurisdiction. Some scholars from countries that use conflict of laws consider the term private international law confusing because this body of law does not consist of laws that apply internationally, but rather is solely composed of domestic laws; the calculus only includes international law when the nation has treaty obligations (and even then, only to the extent that domestic law renders the treaty obligations enforceable). The term private international law comes from the private law/public law dichotomy in civil law systems. In this form of legal system, the term private international law does not imply an agreed upon international legal corpus, but rather refers to those portions of domestic private law that apply to international issues.

Importantly, while conflict of laws generally deals with disputes of an international nature, the applicable law itself is domestic law. This is because, unlike public international law (better known simply as international law), conflict of laws does not regulate the relation between countries but rather how individual countries regulate internally the affairs of individuals with connections to more than one jurisdiction. To be sure, as in other contexts, domestic law can be affected by international treaties to which a country is party.

Moreover, in federal states where substantial lawmaking occurs at the subnational level, notably in the United States, issues within conflict of laws often arise in wholly domestic contexts, relating to the laws of different states (or provinces, etc.) rather than of foreign countries.

== History ==
Western legal systems first recognized a core underpinning of conflict of laws—namely, that "foreign law, in appropriate instances, should be applied to foreign cases"—in the twelfth century. Prior to that, the prevailing system was that of personal law, in which the laws applicable to each individual were dictated by the group to which he or she belonged. Initially, the mode of this body of law was simply to determine which jurisdiction's law would be most fair to apply; over time, however, the law came to favor more well-defined rules. These rules were systematically summarized by law professor Bartolus de Saxoferrato in the middle of the fourteenth century, a work that came to be cited repeatedly for the next several centuries.

Later, in the seventeenth century, several Dutch legal scholars, including Christian Rodenburg, Paulus Voet, Johannes Voet, and Ulrik Huber, further expounded the jurisprudence of conflict of laws. Their key conceptual contributions were twofold: First, nations are wholly sovereign within their borders and therefore cannot be compelled to enforce foreign law in their own courts. Second, in order for international conflicts of law to work rationally, nations must exercise comity in enforcing others' laws, because it is in their mutual interest to do so.Scholars began to consider ways to resolve the question of how and when formally equal sovereign States ought to recognize each other's authority. The doctrine of comity was introduced as one of the means to answer these questions. Comity has undergone various changes since its creation. However, it still refers to the idea that every State is sovereign; often, the most just exercise of one State's authority is by recognizing the authority of another through the recognition and enforcement of another state's laws and judgments. Many states continue to recognize the principle of comity as the underpinning of private international law such as in Canada. In some countries, such as the United States of America and Australia, the principle of comity is written into the State's constitution.

In the United States, salient issues in the field of conflict of laws date back at least to the framing of the Constitution. There was concern, for example, about what body of law the newly created federal courts would apply when handling cases between parties from different states (a type of case potentially within the jurisdiction of the federal courts). Within the first two decades following ratification of the Constitution, over one hundred cases dealt with these issues, though the term conflict of laws was not yet used. The Constitution created a "plurilegal federal union" in which conflicts are inherently abundant, and as a result, American judges encounter conflicts cases far more often—about 5,000 per year as of the mid-2010s—and have accumulated far more experience in resolving them than anywhere else in the world.

Alongside domestic developments relating to conflict of laws, the nineteenth century also saw the beginnings of substantial international collaboration in the field. The first international meeting on the topic took place in Lima in 1887 and 1888; delegates from five South American countries attended, but failed to produce an enforceable agreement. The first major multilateral agreements on the topic of conflict of laws arose from the First South American Congress of Private International Law, which was held in Montevideo from August 1888 to February 1889. The seven South American nations represented at the Montevideo conference agreed on eight treaties, which broadly adopted the ideas of Friedrich Carl von Savigny, determining applicable law on the basis of four types of factual relations (domicile, location of object, location of transaction, location of court).

Soon after, European nations gathered for a conference in The Hague organized by Tobias Asser in 1893. This was followed by successive conferences in 1894, 1900, and 1904. Like their counterparts in Montevideo, these conferences produced several multilateral agreements on various topics within conflict of laws. Thereafter, the pace of these meetings slowed, with the next conventions occurring in 1925 and 1928. The seventh meeting at The Hague occurred in 1951, at which point the sixteen involved states established a permanent institution for international collaboration on conflict-of-laws issues. The organization is known today as the Hague Conference on Private International Law (HCCH). As of December 2020, HCCH includes eighty-six member states.

As attention to the field became more widespread in the second half of the twentieth century, the European Union began to take action to harmonize conflict of laws jurisprudence across its member states. The first of these was the Brussels Convention agreed in 1968, which addressed questions of jurisdiction for cross-border cases. This was followed in 1980 by the Rome Convention, which addressed choice-of-law rules for contract disputes within EU member states. In 2009 and 2010, respectively, the EU enacted the Rome II Regulation to address choice-of-law in tort cases and the Rome III Regulation to address choice-of-law in divorce matters.

== Jurisdiction ==
One of the key questions addressed within conflict of laws is the determination of when the legislature of a given jurisdiction may legislate, or the court of a given jurisdiction can properly adjudicate, regarding a matter that has extra-jurisdictional dimensions. This is known as jurisdiction (sometimes subdivided into adjudicative jurisdiction, the authority to hear a certain case, and prescriptive jurisdiction, the authority of a legislature to pass laws covering certain conduct). Like all aspects of conflict of laws, this question is in the first instance resolved by domestic law, which may or may not incorporate relevant international treaties or other supranational legal concepts. That said, relative to the other two main subtopics of conflicts of law (enforcement of judgements, and choice of law, which are both discussed below), the theory regarding jurisdiction has developed consistent international norms. This is perhaps because, unlike the other subtopics, jurisdiction relates to the particularly thorny question of when it is appropriate for a country to exercise its coercive power at all, rather that merely how it should do so.

There are five bases of jurisdiction generally recognized in international law. These are not mutually exclusive; an individual or an occurrence may be subject to simultaneous jurisdiction in more than one place. They are as follows:

- Territoriality—A country has jurisdiction to regulate whatever occurs within its territorial boundaries. Of all bases of jurisdiction, the territoriality principle garners the strongest consensus in international law (subject to various complexities relating to actions that did not obviously occur wholly in one country).
- Passive personality—A country has jurisdiction over an occurrence that harmed its national.
- Nationality (or active personality)—A country has jurisdiction over a wrong of which its national is the perpetrator.
- Protective—A country has jurisdiction to address threats to its own security (such as by pursuing counterfeiters of official documents).
- Universal—A country has jurisdiction over certain acts based on their intrinsic rejection by the international community (such as violent deprivations of basic human rights). This is the most controversial of the five bases of jurisdiction.

Countries have also developed bodies of law for adjudicating jurisdiction disputes between subnational entities. For example, in the United States, the minimum contacts rule derived from the Due Process Clause of the Fourteenth Amendment to the U.S. Constitution regulates the extent to which one state can exercise jurisdiction over people domiciled in other states, or occurrences that took place in other states.

== Choice of law ==
Courts faced with a choice of law issue have a two-stage process:

1. the court will apply the law of the forum (lex fori) to all procedural matters (including the choice of law rules);
2. it counts the factors that connect or link the legal issues to the laws of potentially relevant states and applies the laws that have the greatest connection, e.g. the law of nationality (lex patriae) or the law of habitual residence (lex domicilii). (See also 'European Harmonization Provisions': "The concept of habitual residence is the civil law equivalent of the common law test of lex domicilii".) The court will determine the plaintiffs' legal status and capacity. The court will determine the law of the state in which land is situated (lex situs) that will be applied to determine all questions of title. The law of the place where a transaction physically takes place or of the occurrence that gave rise to the litigation (lex loci actus) will often be the controlling law selected when the matter is substantive, but the proper law has become a more common choice.

=== Contracts ===
Many contracts and other forms of legally binding agreement include a jurisdiction or arbitration clause specifying the parties' choice of venue for any litigation (called a forum selection clause). In the EU, this is governed by the Rome I Regulation. Choice of law clauses may specify which laws the court or tribunal should apply to each aspect of the dispute. This matches the substantive policy of freedom of contract and will be determined by the law of the state where the choice of law clause confers its competence. Oxford Professor Adrian Briggs suggests that this is doctrinally problematic as it is emblematic of 'pulling oneself up by the bootstraps'.

Judges have accepted that the principle of party autonomy allows the parties to select the law most appropriate to their transaction. This judicial acceptance of subjective intent excludes the traditional reliance on objective connecting factors; it also harms consumers as vendors often impose one-sided contractual terms selecting a venue far from the buyer's home or workplace. Contractual clauses relating to consumers, employees, and insurance beneficiaries are regulated under additional terms set out in Rome I, which may modify the contractual terms imposed by vendors.

== See also ==
- A. V. Dicey
- Comity
- List of Hague Conventions on Private International Law
- Place of the Relevant Intermediary Approach
- Microsoft Corp. v. Motorola Inc.
