= Jurisdiction (area) =

Legal authority and area of control

A jurisdiction is the legal authority of a court, government, or other entity to make and enforce laws within a defined area.

Each state in a federation—such as Australia, Germany, and the United States—forms a separate jurisdiction. Certain laws, however, may be uniform across the constituent states and enforced by federal courts, resulting in a single jurisdiction for those purposes.

A jurisdiction may also prosecute individuals for crimes committed outside its territory if the perpetrator returns. Citizens from other jurisdictions can sometimes be extradited to a jurisdiction where the act is illegal, even if it occurred elsewhere.

Unitary states usually constitute a single jurisdiction. Notable exceptions include the United Kingdom, which has three separate legal systems: England and Wales, Scotland, and Northern Ireland. (Note: Devolution in Wales means some legislation applies only to England or Wales.) China also has separate jurisdictions for Hong Kong and Macao.

== See also ==
- Change of venue
- Ecclesiastical jurisdiction
- Federated state
- Political division
- Sovereign state
- State law
- State (polity)
