= Conflict avoidance =

Behaviors to prevent or minimize conflict

Conflict avoidance is a set of behaviors aimed at preventing or minimizing disagreement with another person. These behaviors can occur before the conflict emerges (e.g., avoiding certain topics, changing the subject) or after the conflict has been expressed (e.g., withholding disagreement, withdrawing from the conversation, giving in). Conflict avoidance can be employed as a temporary measure within a specific situation or as a more permanent approach, such as establishing "taboo topics" or exiting a relationship.

Although conflict avoidance can exist in any interpersonal relationship, it has been studied most closely in the contexts of family and work relationships. Consequently, research on conflict avoidance spans various disciplines including clinical psychology, social psychology, organizational behavior, communication studies, and family studies.

Scholars use the term conflict avoidance to characterize specific behaviors as well as a broader conflict style. A conflict happens when two opposing forces meet and cannot be easily resolved. A conflict management style is an individual's preferred method for handling conflict. Those with an avoidant style tend to sidestep disagreement, postpone dealing with conflict, or withdraw.

Traditionally, conflict avoidance has been considered a dysfunctional approach to managing conflict by researchers, clinicians, and the general public because it leaves issues unresolved and can lead to resentment. However, studies on conflict avoidance have produced mixed results, identifying functional benefits such as strengthening relationships, reducing stress, and increasing productivity. The general consensus is that avoidance is neither inherently good nor bad for conflict management but depends on the specific relationship, topic, and context.

== Terminology ==
Conflicts are inevitable and not always the result of malintent or other underlying problems. Avoiding all conflict is impossible. For example, a person may experience a conflict because they want to attend two different events at the same time. Conflicts also arise when the legitimate needs or desires of two people or groups do not coincide. For example, people need sleep when they are sick, but parents may find that their need for sleep is in conflict with their need to care for an equally ill child. They may have opposing interests (e.g., the parent's interest in sleep versus the child's interest in having the parent awake) or incompatible actions (e.g., the parent cannot sleep because the child is crying).

Conflict management is the process of responding to a conflict; its goal is a satisfactory resolution of the conflict. Conflict resolution is finding ways to resolve the conflict. For example, the person could decide which event to attend, or the parent could ask someone else to help the sick child.

A conflict management style is the habitual way that a person responds to conflict. In the Thomas-Kilman model, there are five styles, of which avoidance is one. For example, if the person invited to two events has an avoidant style, they might procrastinate on deciding which event to attend until it is too late to attend either of them.

== Origins and theoretical framework ==
=== Strategic goals ===
Early research in conflict management focused on effective ways to actively manage conflict within the organizational setting. This line of research was largely inspired by the Management Grid introduced by theoreticians Robert R. Blake and Jane Mouton as well as Morton Deustch's Theory of Cooperation and Competition. In the 1970s and 80s, various management scholars redeveloped these models, renaming the various dimensions and developing self-report scales to measure individual conflict management styles. One of the most popular versions to come out of this research was the Dual Concerns Model introduced by Pruitt & Rubin (1986) to predict behavior in negotiations. They labeled the two dimensions: concern for self and concern for others. The avoidance conflict style is marked by a low concern for self and low concern for their negotiation partner. While the specific labels for each dimension and conflict styles vary across different models, avoidance is generally considered a passive, lose-lose approach.

=== Personality ===
Conflict avoidance is often rooted in early socialization and personality traits that influence individuals' perception of potential harms or opportunities. According to communication scholar Michael Roloff, individuals often seek to create and maintain a state of interpersonal harmony in their relationships, which is defined by consensus about most issues. The existence of conflict threatens harmony, and some individuals report that they generally wish to avoid conflict. For example, some individuals have a low tolerance for disagreement, tend to take conflict personally, and believe that conflict is always destructive. Research has found that conflict avoidance is positively associated with agreeableness and neuroticism. One study of 350 undergraduates and 100 managers discovered that personality traits, as measured by the Big Five, accounted for 20% of the variance in avoidant conflict style.

=== Cultural influences ===
According to Stella Ting-Toomey's Face Negotiation Theory, avoidant behavior may also be motivated by face concerns, defined as the self-image an individual has in social interactions. This theory is used by cross-cultural researchers to explain how people from different cultures interpret and react to conflict. For example, in collective societies, there is more of a sensitivity to hierarchy compared to the West, leading to greater avoidance when there is significant separation between the parties involved. In collective societies, there are also greater relationship-oriented values and a belief that a direct approach will harm a relationship, causing a greater prevalence of conflict avoidance. Generally, individuals from collectivist societies are more likely to avoid conflict compared to individuals from individualistic societies.

== Consequences of conflict avoidance ==
Research within conflict avoidance psychology has identified three areas that are significantly impacted by an individual's choices surrounding conflict: stress, loneliness, and relationship satisfaction. According to communication scholar Michael Roloff, the general sentiment is that leaving conflicts unresolved and unaddressed causes interpersonal issues to fester, resulting in either explosive confrontation or crippling emotional suppression. However, empirical research has found mixed results, associating conflict avoidance with both positive and negative outcomes.

=== Intimate relationships ===
Partners in long-term relationships often "pick their battles" and withhold complaints to manage conflict. However, withdrawing from conflict has been associated with higher rates of divorce and lower relationship quality. According to communication scholars Caughlin & Scott, explicit avoidance is far more damaging than implicit or tacit avoidance.

Conflict avoidance is just as prevalent within stable marriages as in unstable ones. Overall, the effect of conflict avoidance may depend on the interpretation of the behavior rather than the behavior itself.

=== Family relationships ===
Conflict in families can serve an important function, supporting child development through individuation and communicating the specific needs of individual family members. When conflicts are avoided, individuals may perceive their family as unresponsive or indifferent to their needs, which increases frustration and hostility. Conflict avoidance has been associated with poor outcomes for children, including loneliness and maladjustment.

Conflict avoidance can result in family estrangement, as a person may break off the relationship to avoid dealing with the messy reality of other people having conflicting needs and desires. A pattern of conflict avoidance can result in social isolation and not learning the skills to manage emotions.

=== In the workplace ===
Conflict avoidance has received considerably less study and attention compared to active conflict management behaviors such as mediation or integrative negotiation. This is partly due to the difficulty of studying unobservable behaviors such as "not engaging" or "avoiding" conflict. In the workplace, avoiding conflict often leads to emotional suppression and feelings of powerlessness, which can increase stress, burnout, and fatigue. From a productivity perspective, conflict avoidance is negatively related to information exchange and team cohesiveness. Unresolved conflict in the workplace has been linked to miscommunication resulting from confusion or refusal to cooperate, increased stress, reduced creative collaboration and team problem-solving, and distrust. However, this negative effect depends on the quality of workplace relationships; in generally positive relationships, avoiding conflict can be associated with higher productivity.

== Measuring conflict avoidance ==
There are two main approaches to studying conflict avoidance in academic research: self-report scales and behavioral observation. Several instruments have been developed to measure conflict management styles based on the dual-concerns model and are listed below:

| Instrument | Author | Context |
|---|---|---|
| Conflict Strategies in Serial Arguments | Bevan (2014) | Romantic Couples |
| Dutch Test for Conflict Handling (DUTCH) | De Dreu et al. (2001) | Workplace Conflict |
| Management of Differences Exercise (MODE) | Thomas & Kilmann (1977) | Workplace Conflict |
| Organizational Communication Conflict Instrument (OCCI) | Putnam & Wilson (1982) | Workplace Conflict |
| Rahim Organizational Conflict Inventory II (ROCI - II) | Rahim (1983) | Workplace Conflict |

== Interventions ==
Experts suggest that management should not wait for formal complaints to take action and should establish unrelated complaint networks such as counselors to provide a more effective outlet for avoiding employee distress. Managers should also develop strong cooperative goals and proactively train employees in conflict management which promotes more constructive conflict management.

== See also ==
- Organizational conflict
- Conflict management
- Conflict management style
- Interpersonal relationship
