= Self-complexity =

Person's perceived knowledge of themself

Self-complexity is a person's perceived knowledge of themself, based upon the number of distinct cognitive structures, or self-aspects, they believe to possess. These self-aspects can include context-dependent social roles, relationships, activities, superordinate traits, and goals of the individual, which combine to form the larger, associative network of their self-concept. According to self-complexity theory, an individual who has a number of self-aspects that are unique in their attributes will have greater self-complexity than one who has only a few self-aspects, or whose self-aspects are closely associated to one another. In other words, self-complexity may invoke the question, “How full is the self-concept”?

== The self-complexity model ==
The term self-complexity was first coined by psychologist Patricia Linville (1985, 1987), who also developed a model for the concept. Linville's model for self-complexity suggests that self-aspects are “activated” in the context of a relevant experience, and it is these experiences that impact how particular self-aspects are viewed. If an individual experiences a favourable event towards which they feel positively, self-aspects that have been activated by the experience will be associated with positive feelings. In contrast, self-aspects will be associated with negative thoughts and feelings when they are activated by unfavourable experiences. In addition, the more similar self-aspects are to one another, the more likely it will be for the thoughts and feelings associated with one self-aspect to “spillover”, influencing the thoughts and feelings linked to other, overlapping self-aspects. Consequently, the self-complexity model suggests that highly self-complex individuals who possess the greatest number of distinct self-aspects will be less vulnerable to swings in affect and self-appraisal in response to life events, relative to individuals who possess limited and/or indistinct self-aspects (i.e., low self-complexity). This is due to the fact that highly self-complex individuals are suspected of being better able to compartmentalize their life events, as well as having a smaller proportion of their self-aspects affected by any salient emotional event, whether positive or negative. In essence, after receiving any form of self-relevant feedback individuals high in self-complexity will have less of their self-concept represented, and as a result will exhibit less extreme affective responses.

== Approaches ==
=== Developmental perspective ===
A variety of different views are held concerning the nature of self-complexity. From a developmental perspective, self-complexity is viewed as one of the primary features of development, and it is thought to increase with age. Young children are believed to possess relatively few and undifferentiated self-aspects (i.e., low self-complexity), resulting in a simplified self-concept. As children grow in terms of their physical, social, and cognitive selves, they should attain the cognitive capacity necessary to identify a greater number of distinct self-aspects (i.e., increasing self-complexity) and thus reflect a more developed, multi-faceted self-concept. The developmentalist perspective would therefore expect older children to have not only a greater number of self-aspects in comparison to younger children, but also to have less interrelation between their self-aspects. The perspective also stresses the need to examine other indices of development, including identity status, cognitive developmental level, and ego development, as factors that have the potential to provide an enhanced understanding of self-complexity development.

=== Clinical and personality perspectives ===
Contrary to the developmental viewpoint, clinical and personality perspectives focus predominantly upon the potential protective factors of self-complexity that carry into adulthood. Specifically, the perspective suggests that highly self-complex individuals are at less risk for depression and psychopathologies, such as borderline personality disorder, because they can compensate for their negatively affected self-aspects by focusing on their unaffected self-aspects, thus preserving their global self-worth. In comparisons of clinical and normal adolescent populations, the self-concept domains of psychiatric inpatients are often found to be significantly more interrelated, suggesting low self-complexity. Additionally, clinical and personality perspectives not only consider low self-complexity as a factor in psychopathology, they also infer that individuals with psychopathologies may be delayed in the normal development of self-complexity.

== Implications for high vs. low self-complexity ==
In accordance with clinical and personality perspectives, variations in self-complexity are suggested to be factors that either contribute to, or protect against damages to individuals’ physical and mental well-being. In particular, individual differences in self-complexity are predictive of emotional stability and reactivity to stress, which can moderate depression, physical illnesses, and self-esteem.

=== Benefits of high self-complexity ===
According to Linville, individuals who possess high self-complexity may use their unaffected self-aspects as cognitive buffers, protecting against negative affects/self-appraisals and the health consequences associated with these stressors. For example, a woman who considers herself a successful lawyer, mother, wife and friend may experience less negative affects and self-appraisals, following a divorce, compared to a woman whose self-aspects were limited to her being a successful lawyer and wife, because the former retains a number of diverse self-aspects on which she can rely. Furthermore, if another woman's self-aspect as a wife was closely associated with her self-aspect as a lawyer (if, for example, her husband was also a lawyer) her affectivity could be even more severely impacted due to the spillover process, leading to heightened feelings of inadequacy and stress. In this vein, high self-complexity could be considered a buffer against threats to a particular domain of self-aspects, while low self-complexity could be viewed as a diathesis for stress-related disorders and depression; the majority of an individual's self-aspects would be negatively affected by stressful life events.

=== Benefits of low self-complexity ===
As an alternative to the conclusions above, other members in the field of psychology consider low self-complexity to benefit individuals’ well-being in select scenarios. Despite the fact that highly self-complex individuals are capable of limiting their affective reactivity to negative events, this same emotional restraint is observed in reaction to positive events. Therefore, in comparison to highly self-complex individuals, individuals who are low in self-complexity, but who generally experience positive life events are likely to experience increased positive affect, enhancing well-being and self-esteem and deterring the effects of depression and physical illness that are typically stress-induced. This effect is especially likely if low self-complexity individuals believe they possess an extensive social support network and desirable personality characteristics. Moreover, although high self-complexity allows numerous, differentiated self-aspects to diffuse the damage incurred by one or more self-aspects in undesirable experiences, the possession of multiple, unrelated self-aspects can be viewed as a fragmentation of one's self-concept. From this stance, highly self-complex individuals may suffer the strain of role conflict, identity uncertainty, and/or identity competition (e.g., determined businesswoman vs. nurturing mother), all of which have been known to enhance depression, neuroticism, and low self-esteem and can ultimately lead to chronic, low-level stress as a result of everyday hassle. In light of these arguments, it is suggested that high self-complexity is beneficial only to the extent that one's various self-aspects remain distinct, yet integrated with one another.

== Future of the self-complexity model ==
Linville's model for self-complexity has been widespread in the research community since the time of its inception in 1985. Given the influence and popularity of her model for explaining personality complexity and its relation to well-being, numerous criticisms and alternative suggestions have been made to improve upon the model's consistency, reliability, and validity.

=== Criticisms ===
In terms of criticisms, research has found that the buffering effect of high self-complexity, as proposed by Linville, receives mixed support at best. Other criticisms have focused upon Linville's choice to operationally define self-complexity as a combination of the number and differentiation of self-aspects; many believe that variations in well-being could be better accounted for if the two factors were considered separately, rather than as one entity in self-complexity theory.

=== Suggested alternatives ===
Recent alternatives suggest that it is not the complexity of an individual, that is, the number and distinctiveness of their self-aspects, which moderates well-being, but rather the authenticity of one's self-aspects. This emphasizes the potential prominence of self-determination theory (SDT), which focuses upon the authentication of behaviours, values, and self-presentations as an integral feature to personal well-being. The concept of possible self-complexity has also been addressed to consider how this factor could mediate reactions to feedback regarding future, rather than present goals of an individual.

== See also ==
- Self-concept
- Self-Determination Theory
- Self-esteem
- Self-schema
