= Gregorio Billikopf =

Gregorio Billikopf (September 23, 1954 in Santiago, Chile -July 5, 2023 in Citrus Heights, California) was a Chilean mediator, author, and, from 1981, a farm advisor specializing in labor management for the University of California, Davis.

== Career ==
In May 2005, Billikopf accepted a visiting faculty appointment as an honorary professor of agricultural labor management at the University of Chile in Santiago.

Billikopf was a frequent national and international speaker (including United States, as well as in Russia, México, Canada, Uganda, Colombia, Argentina, Spain, Japan, New Zealand and his native Chile) in his field.

His agricultural extension research and teaching efforts focused on such topics as employee selection, compensation, performance appraisal, discipline and termination, supervision, interpersonal relations, conflict resolution, and interpersonal negotiation skills.

Billikopf received the 1989 National Association for County Agricultural Agents (NACAA) Achievement Award and the 2006 Distinguished Service Award. He received a number of other awards from NACAA, including two National Winner communication awards: Webpage in 1999 (Agricultural Labor Management); and Publication in 2006 (for his book Labor Management in Agriculture: Cultivating Personnel Productivity, 2nd Edition, 2003).

Billikopf authored numerous articles published in academic journals and several books. These included Labor Management in Agriculture (1994, 2003) and Party Directed Mediation: Facilitating Dialogue Between Individuals (3rd Edition, 2014), which portrays practical examples of party-directed mediation, a specialty within the field of alternative dispute resolution. He presented his two mediation models, party-directed mediation (PDM) and Negotiated Performance Appraisal (NPA), for dealing with peer to peer conflict and supervisor-subordinate conflict, respectively, at the International Association for Conflict Management [IACM] annual meetings in 2005 (Seville, Spain) and 2009 (Kyoto, Japan).

== Personal life ==
Billikopf was raised in Chile's Central Valley, where his maternal family had been grape growers in Chile for generations. It was at the labor-intensive family vineyard, where he spent much of his youth, that he first developed an interest in labor issues, horses and agriculture.

Billikopf went on to obtain his Bachelor of Science in agronomy from UC Davis, and his Master of Arts in labor management from California State University, Stanislaus. In March 1974, after reading the Book of Mormon, Billikopf became a member of the Church of Jesus Christ of Latter-day Saints.

Following his retirement from the University of California in 2014, Billikopf and his wife resided in the Lake Region of Llanquihue, Chile. His interests included acting as a dressage (equestrian sports) instructor, amateur radio operator, soccer referee. He wrote an online blog about the Hebrew Holy Scriptures, especially Isaiah and the latter prophets (NEVI'M).

Billikopf was of Lithuanian-Jewish and German-Jewish descent on his father's side, being the grandson of Jacob Billikopf (involved in social work, Jewish philanthropy and labor arbitration) and great-grandson of Louis Marshall (corporate, constitutional and civil rights lawyer as well as a mediator and Jewish community leader). On his Chilean mother's side, Billikopf was related to Francisco Antonio Encina, author of the 20 volume Historia de Chile.

Billikopf returned to California in his later years. He died in Citrus Heights, California at age 68. He was survived by his wife and three of his four children.

== See also ==
- Party-directed mediation
