= Mediation =

Dispute resolution with assistance of a moderator

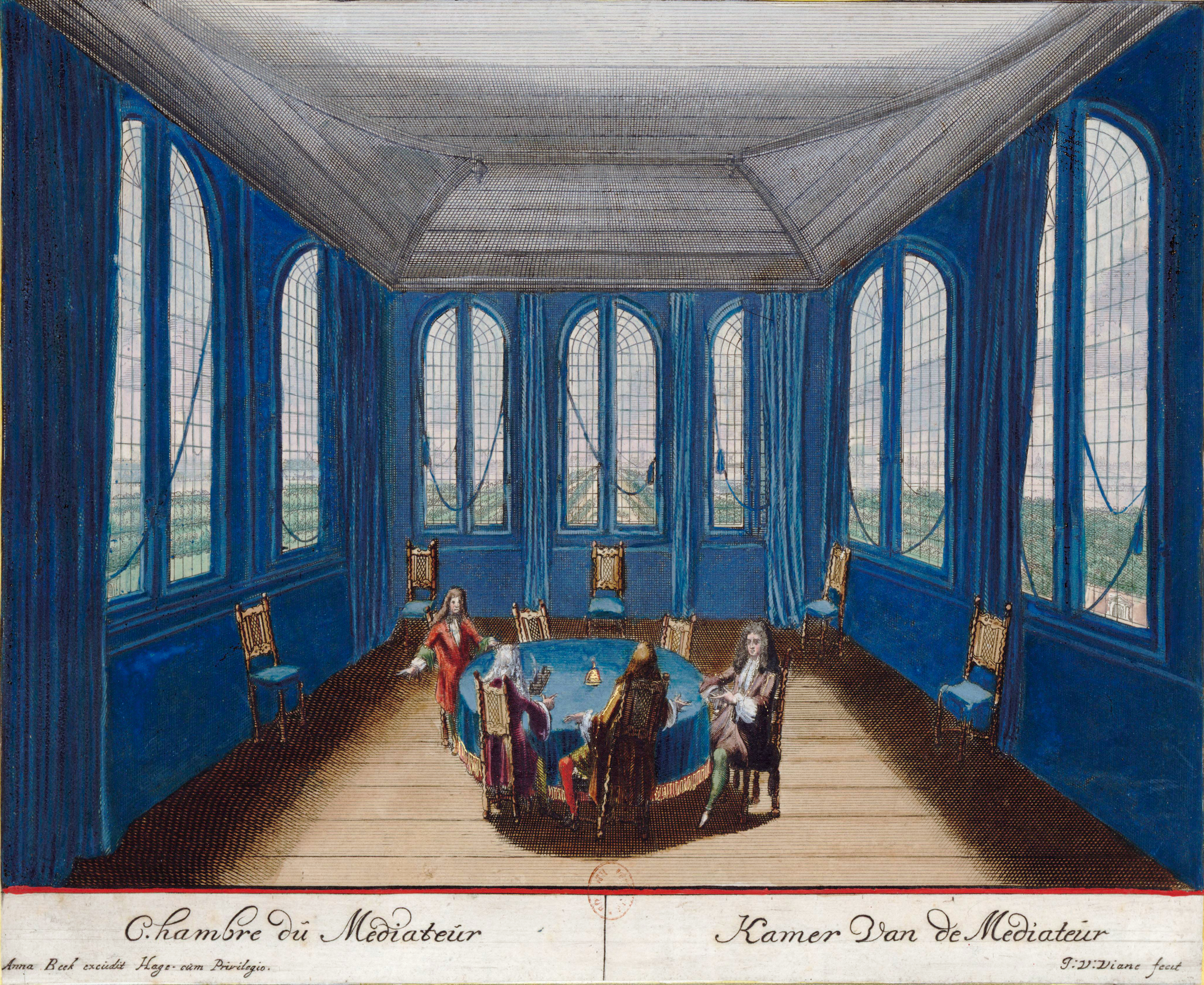
Mediator's chamber at Ryswick (1697)

Mediation is a form of dispute resolution that resolves disputes between two or more parties, facilitated by an independent neutral third party known as the mediator. It is a structured, interactive process where the mediator assists the parties to negotiate a resolution or settlement through the use of specialized communication and negotiation techniques. All participants in mediation are encouraged to participate in the process actively. Mediation is "party-centered," focusing on the needs, interests, and concerns of the individuals involved, rather than imposing a solution from an external authority. The mediator uses a wide variety of techniques to guide the process in a constructive direction and to help the parties find their optimal solution.

Mediation can take different forms, depending on the mediator's approach. In facilitative mediation, the mediator assists parties by fostering communication and helping them understand each other's viewpoints. In evaluative mediation, the mediator may assess the issues, identify possible solutions, and suggest ways to reach an agreement, but without prescribing a specific outcome. Mediation can be evaluative in that the mediator analyzes issues and relevant norms ("reality-testing"), while refraining from providing prescriptive advice to the parties (e.g., "You should do..."). Unlike a judge or arbitrator, mediators do not have the authority to make binding decisions, ensuring that the resolution reflects the voluntary agreement of the parties involved.

The term mediation broadly refers to any instance in which a third party helps others reach an agreement. More specifically, mediation has a structure, timetable, and dynamics that "ordinary" negotiation lacks. The process is private and confidential, possibly enforced by law. Participation is typically voluntary. The mediator acts as a neutral third party and facilitates rather than directs what the outcome of the process must be.

Mediation is becoming an internationally accepted way to end disputes. The Singapore Mediation Convention offers a means of enforcing settlement agreements arising out of international commercial disputes.

Mediation is not identical in all countries. In particular, there are some differences between mediation in countries with Anglo-Saxon legal traditions and countries with civil law traditions.

Mediators use various techniques to open, or improve, dialogue and empathy between disputants, aiming to help the parties reach an agreement. Much depends on the mediator's skill and training. As the practice has gained popularity, training programs, certifications and licensing have produced trained and professional mediators committed to their discipline.

== History ==
The activity of mediation appeared in ancient times. The practice developed in Ancient Greece which knew the non-marital mediator as a proxenetas(προ - pro = before + ξενος - xenos =strangers), then in Roman civilization. (Roman law, starting from Justinian's Digest of 530–533 CE) recognized mediation. The Romans called mediators by a variety of names, including internuncius, medium, intercessor, philantropus, interpolator, conciliator, interlocutor, interpres, and finally mediator.

Following the war against Rome, the Kushites sent mediators to Augustus, who was in Samos, and in the year 21/20 BC, a peace treaty was concluded.

In the Epistle to the Philippians, Chapter 4, written in the First Century A.D., Saint Paul asks Euodia and Syntyche, two women leaders of the nascent Christian community, to submit to a form of mediation, possibly by Epaphroditus.

Now mediation is a form of professional service, and mediators are professionally trained for mediation.

== Benefits ==
The benefits of mediation include:

Cost
While a mediator may charge a fee comparable to that of an attorney, the mediation process generally takes much less time than moving a case through standard legal channels. While a case in the hands of a lawyer or a court may take months or years to resolve, mediation usually achieves a resolution in a matter of hours. Taking less time means expending less money on hourly fees and costs.

Confidentiality
While court hearings are public, mediation remains strictly confidential. No one but the parties to the dispute and the mediator or mediators know what happened. Confidentiality in mediation has such importance that in most cases the legal system cannot force a mediator to testify in court as to the content or progress of mediation. Many mediators destroy their notes taken during a mediation once that mediation has finished. The only exceptions to such strict confidentiality usually involve child abuse or actual or threatened criminal acts.

Control
Mediation increases the control the parties have over the resolution. In a court case, the parties obtain a resolution, but control resides with the judge or jury. Often, a judge or jury cannot legally provide solutions that emerge in mediation. Thus, mediation is more likely to produce a result that is mutually agreeable for the parties.

Compliance
Because the result is attained by the parties working together and is mutually agreeable, compliance with the mediated agreement is usually high. This further reduces costs, because the parties do not have to employ an attorney to force compliance with the agreement. The mediated agreement is, however, fully enforceable in a court of law.

Mutuality
Parties to a mediation are typically ready to work mutually toward a resolution. In most circumstances the mere fact that parties are willing to mediate means that they are ready to "move" their position. The parties thus are more amenable to understanding the other party's side and work on underlying issues to the dispute. This has the added benefit of often preserving the relationship the parties had before the dispute. Parties as a part of the mediation are encouraged to negotiate on the basis of interests rather than positions that they hold. The object of this is to have deeper conversations which can give rise to a wider ambit of solutions considering more than just the items up for discussion in the session. Some mediators are also of the opinion that it is their responsibility to bring the parties to think this way, commonly called interest-based negotiation.

Support
Mediators are trained in working with difficult situations. The mediator acts as a neutral facilitator and guides the parties through the process. The mediator helps the parties think "outside of the box" for possible solutions to the dispute, broadening the range of possible solutions.

== Uses ==
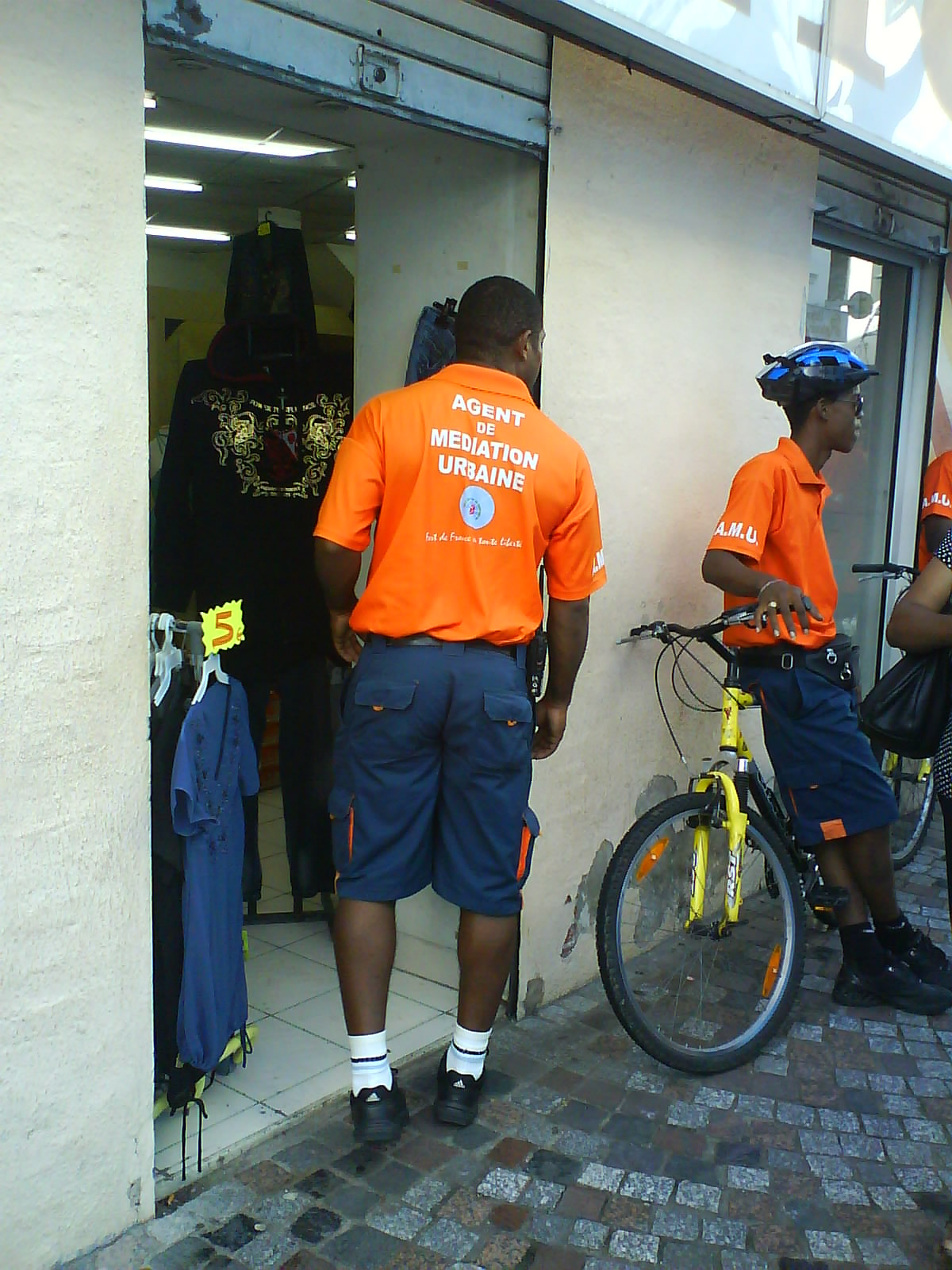
Urban mediators in Fort-de-France, Martinique. 2007

In addition to dispute resolution, mediation can function as a means of dispute prevention, such as facilitating the process of contract negotiation. Governments can use mediation to inform and to seek input from stakeholders in formulation or fact-seeking aspects of policy-making.

Mediation is applicable to disputes in many areas:

Family

- Prenuptial/Premarital agreements
- Financial or budget disagreements
- Separation
- Divorce
- Alimony
- Parenting plans (child custody and visitation)
- Eldercare
- Family businesses
- Adult sibling conflicts
- Parent(s)/adult children
- Estates
- Medical ethics and end-of-life

Workplace

- Wrongful termination
- Workers' compensation
- Discrimination
- Harassment
- Grievances
- Labor management

Commercial

- Landlord/tenant
- Homeowners' associations
- Builders/contractors/realtors/homeowners
- Contracts
- Medical malpractice
- Personal injury
- Partnerships

Public disputes

- Environmental
- Land-use

Other

- School conflicts
- Violence-prevention
- Victim-Offender mediation
- Non-profit organizations
- Faith communities

Within business and commercial mediation, frequently a distinction is made between business-to-business (B2B), business-to-employee (B2E) and business-to-consumer (B2C) situations.

=== Industrial relations ===
==== Australia ====
ADR, Alternative Dispute Resolution, began in industrial relations in Australia long before the arrival of the modern ADR movement. One of the first statutes passed by the Commonwealth parliament was the Conciliation and Arbitration Act 1904 (Cth). This allowed the Federal Government to pass laws on conciliation and arbitration for the prevention and settlement of industrial disputes extending beyond the limits of any one state. Conciliation has been the most prominently used form of ADR, and is generally far removed from modern mediation.

Significant changes in state policy took place from 1996 to 2007. The 1996 Workplace Relations Act (Cth) sought to shift the industrial system away from a collectivist approach, where unions and the Australian Industrial Relations Commission (AIRC) had strong roles, to a more decentralized system of individual bargaining between employers and employees. The Act diminished the traditional role of the AIRC by placing the responsibility of resolving disputes at the enterprise level. This allowed mediation to be used to resolve industrial relations disputes instead of traditional conciliation.

In industrial relations under the 2006 WorkChoices amendments to the Workplace Relations Act. Examples of this use of mediation can be seen in recent enterprise bargaining negotiations. The Australian government claimed the benefits of mediation to include the following:

- Cost saving
- Reduced polarization
- Education
- Broader issues vs the courts
- Greater access to justice
- More control by disputant over the process

=== Workplace matters ===
The implementation of human resource management (HRM) policies and practices has evolved to focus on the individual worker, and rejects all other third parties such as unions and AIRC. HRM together with the political and economic changes undertaken by Australia's Howard government created an environment where private ADR can be fostered in the workplace.

The decline of unionism and the rise of the individual encouraged the growth of mediation. This is demonstrated in the industries with the lowest unionization rates such as in the private business sector having the greatest growth of mediation.

The 2006 Work Choices Act made further legislative changes to deregulate industrial relations. A key element of the new changes was to weaken the AIRC by encouraging competition with private mediation.

A great variety of disputes occur in the workplace, including disputes between staff members, allegations of harassment, contractual disputes and workers compensation claims. At large, workplace disputes are between people who have an ongoing working relationship within a closed system, which indicate that mediation or a workplace investigation would be appropriate as dispute resolution processes. However the complexity of relationships, involving hierarchy, job security and competitiveness can complicate mediation.

Party-directed mediation (PDM) is an emerging mediation approach particularly suited for disputes between co-workers, colleagues or peers, especially deep-seated interpersonal conflict, multicultural or multiethnic disputes. The mediator listens to each party separately in a pre-caucus or pre-mediation before ever bringing them into a joint session. Part of the pre-caucus also includes coaching and role plays. The idea is that the parties learn how to converse directly with their adversary in the joint session. Some unique challenges arise when organizational disputes involve supervisors and subordinates. The negotiated performance appraisal (NPA) is a tool for improving communication between supervisors and subordinates and is particularly useful as an alternate mediation model because it preserves the hierarchical power of supervisors while encouraging dialogue and dealing with differences in opinion.

=== Community mediation ===
Community mediation centers, known also as Community Dispute Resolution (CDR) Programs, Community Conflict Resolution Programs, and Neighborhood Justice Centers, help individuals or groups in communities handle interpersonal or community disputes outside of formal court processes. Such organizations often serve populations that cannot afford to utilize the courts or professional ADR-providers, and use trained volunteer mediators to assist with their cases. Community programs typically provide mediation for disputes between landlords and tenants, members of homeowners associations, small businesses and consumers, and families. Many community programs offer their services for free or at a nominal fee. Some organizations also serve as a mediation training institute, and provide opportunities for community members to become certified in basic mediation training, or additional specialized mediation training.

Experimental community mediation programs using volunteer mediators began in the early 1970s in several major U.S. cities. These proved to be so successful that hundreds of programs were founded throughout the country in the following two decades. In some jurisdictions, such as California, the parties have the option of making their agreement enforceable in court.

In Australia mediation was incorporated extensively into family law Family Law Act 1975 and the 2006 Amendments Mandatory, subject to certain exceptions, Family Dispute Resolution Mediation is required before courts will consider disputed parenting arrangements. The Family Dispute Resolution Practitioners who provide this service are accredited by the Attorney-General's Department.

Community accountability is a community-based strategy for a group of friends, a family, a neighborhood, etc. come together outside of the criminal justice system or any punitive system and hold people accountable as a community using transformative justice, which may or may not include mediation.

Community mediation centers often use restorative practices, which are deeply rooted in ancient and indigenous traditions worldwide, to build and repair relationships, particularly within schools and juvenile justice systems.

=== Peer mediation ===
A peer mediator is one who resembles the disputants, such as being of similar age, attending the same school or having similar status in a business. Purportedly, peers can better relate to the disputants than an outsider.

Peer mediation promotes social cohesion and aids development of protective factors that create positive school climates. The National Healthy School Standard (Department for Education and Skills, 2004) highlighted the significance of this approach to reducing bullying and promoting pupil achievement. Schools adopting this process recruit and train interested students to prepare them.

Peace Pals is an empirically validated peer mediation program. It was studied over a 5-year period and revealed several positive outcomes including a reduction in elementary school violence and enhanced social skills, while creating a more positive, peaceful school climate.

Peer mediation helped reduce crime in schools, saved counselor and administrator time, enhanced self-esteem, improved attendance and encouraged development of leadership and problem-solving skills among students. Such conflict resolution programs increased in U.S. schools 40% between 1991 and 1999.

Peace Pals was studied in a diverse, suburban elementary school. Peer mediation was available to all students (N = 825). Significant and long-term reductions in school-wide violence over a five-year period occurred. The reductions included both verbal and physical conflict. Mediator knowledge made significant gains pertaining to conflict, conflict resolution and mediation, which was maintained at 3-month follow-up. Additionally, mediators and participants viewed the Peace Pals program as effective and valuable, and all mediation sessions resulted in successful resolution.

=== Commercial disputes ===
The commercial domain remains one of the most common applications of mediation, as measured by the number of mediators and the total value of disputes. The result of business mediation is typically a bilateral contract.

Commercial mediation includes work in finance, insurance, ship-brokering, procurement and real estate. In some areas, mediators have specialized designations and typically operate under special laws. Generally, mediators cannot themselves practice commerce in markets for goods in which they work as mediators.

Procurement mediation comprises disputes between a public body and a private body. In common law jurisdictions only regulatory stipulations on creation of supply contracts that derive from the fields of State Aids (EU Law and domestic application) or general administrative guidelines extend ordinary laws of commerce. The general law of contract applies in the UK accordingly. Procurement mediation occurs in circumstances after creation of the contract where a dispute arises in regard to the performance or payments. A Procurement mediator in the UK may choose to specialise in this type of contract or a public body may appoint an individual to a specific mediation panel.

=== Native-title mediation ===
In response to the Mabo decision, the Australian Government sought to engage the population and industry on Mabo's implications for land tenure and use by enacting the Native Title Act 1993 (Cth), which required mediation as a mechanism to determine future native title rights. The process incorporated the Federal Court and the National Native Title Tribunal (NNTT). Mediation can occur in parallel with legal challenges, such as occurred in Perth.

Some features of native title mediation that distinguish it from other forms include lengthy time frames, the number of parties (ranging on occasion into the hundreds) and that statutory and case law prescriptions constrain some aspects of the negotiations.

=== Global relevance ===
Mediation's effectiveness in trans-border disputes has been questioned, but an understanding of fundamental mediation principles points to the unlimited potential of mediation in such disputes. Mediators explicitly address and manage cultural and language differences in detail during the process. Voluntary referral to mediation is not required—much mediation to reach the table through binding contractual provisions, statutes, treaties, or international agreements and accords. The principle of voluntariness applies to the right of parties to self-determination once they are in the mediation—not to the mechanism for initiating the mediation process. Much mediation also results form mutual consent because they are non-binding and they encourage the exploration of interests and mutual benefits of an agreement. Because the parties, themselves, create the terms of agreement, compliance with mediated settlement agreements is relatively high. Any compliance or implementation issues can be addressed by follow-up mediation, regular compliance monitoring, and other processes.

== Process ==
=== Roles ===
Mediation is in contrast to the process common in a court of law where advocates engage in contentious litigation on behalf of their clients, arguing before a parental figure such as a judge or arbitrator. Both advocates and arbitrator effectively deprive the disputants of any responsibility for the outcome by imposing a solution.

During mediation the participants have to take personal responsibility for resolving their issues. The mediator takes no part other than to reduce the emotional temperature and facilitate full and frank exchange of views, "reframing" aggressive or insulting language into a rational, neutral statement of fact.

==== Mediator ====
The mediator's primary role is to act as a neutral third party who facilitates discussions between the parties. In addition, a mediator serves in an evaluative role when they analyze, assess the issues, and engage in reality-testing. A mediator is neutral and they are not the agent of any party. In their role, mediators do not offer prescriptive advice (e.g., "You should settle this case," or, "Your next offer should be X."). Mediators also manage the interaction between the parties and encourage constructive communication through the use of specialized communication techniques.

Finally, the mediator should restrict pressure, aggression and intimidation, demonstrate how to communicate through employing good speaking and listening skills, and paying attention to non-verbal messages and other signals emanating from the context of the mediation and possibly contributing expertise and experience. The mediator should direct the parties to focus on issues and stay away from personal attacks.

==== Parties ====
The role of the parties varies according to their motivations and skills, the role of legal advisers, the model of mediation, the style of mediator and the culture in which the mediation takes place. Legal requirements may also affect their roles. Party-directed mediation (PDM) is an emerging approach involving a pre-caucus between the mediator and each of the parties before going into the joint session. The idea is to help the parties improve their interpersonal negotiation skills so that in the joint session they can address each other with little mediator interference.

===== Authority =====
One of the general requirements for successful mediation is that those representing the respective parties have full authority to negotiate and settle the dispute. If this is not the case, then there is what Spencer and Brogan refer to as the "empty chair" phenomenon, that is, the person who ought to be discussing the problem is simply not present.

===== Preparation =====
The parties' first role is to consent to mediation, possibly before preparatory activities commence. Parties then prepare in much the same way they would for other varieties of negotiations. Parties may provide position statements, valuation reports and risk assessment analysis. The mediator may supervise/facilitate their preparation and may require certain preparations.

===== Disclosure =====
Agreements to mediate, mediation rules, and court-based referral orders may have disclosure requirements. Mediators may have express or implied powers to direct parties to produce documents, reports and other material. In court-referred mediations parties usually exchange with each other all material which would be available through discovery or disclosure rules were the matter to proceed to hearing, including witness statements, valuations and statement accounts.

===== Participation =====
Mediation requires direct input from the parties. Parties must attend and participate in the mediation meeting. Some mediation rules require parties to attend in person. Participation at one stage may compensate for absence at another stage.

=== Meeting ===
The typical mediation has no formal compulsory elements, although some elements usually occur:

- establishment of ground rules framing the boundaries of mediation
- parties detail their stories
- identification of issues
- identify options
- discuss and analyze solutions
- adjust and refine proposed solutions
- record agreement in writing

Individual mediators vary these steps to match specific circumstances, given that the law does not ordinarily govern mediators' methods.

=== Post-mediation activities ===
==== Ratification and review ====
Ratification and review provide safeguards for mediating parties. They also provide an opportunity for persons not privy to the mediation to undermine the result. Some mediated agreements require ratification by an external body—such as a board, council or cabinet. In some situations, the sanctions of a court or other external authority must explicitly endorse a mediation agreement. Thus if a grandparent or other non-parent is granted residence rights in a family dispute, a court counselor will be required to furnish a report to the court on the merits of the proposed agreement to aid the court's ultimate disposition of the case. In other situations, it may be agreed to have agreements reviewed by lawyers, accountants or other professional advisers.

The implementation of mediated agreements must comply with the statues and regulations of the governing jurisdiction.

Parties to a private mediation may also wish to obtain court sanction for their decisions. Under the Queensland regulatory scheme on court-connected mediation, mediators are required to file with a registrar a certificate about the mediation in a form prescribed in the regulations. A party may subsequently apply to a relevant court an order giving effect to the agreement reached. Where court sanction is not obtained, mediated settlements have the same status as any other agreements.

==== Referrals ====
Mediators may at their discretion refer one or more parties to psychologists, accountants, social workers or others for post-mediation professional assistance.

==== Mediator debriefing ====
In some situations, a post-mediation debriefing and feedback session is conducted between co-mediators or between mediators and supervisors. It involves a reflective analysis and evaluation of the process. In many community mediation services debriefing is compulsory and mediators are paid for the debriefing session.

==== Measuring effectiveness ====
In addition to the fact of reaching a settlement, party satisfaction and mediator competence can be measured. Surveys of mediation parties reveal strong levels of satisfaction with the process. Of course, if parties are generally satisfied post-settlement, then such measures may not be particularly explanatory.

== Mediators ==
=== Education and training ===
The educational requirements for accreditation as a mediator differ between accrediting groups and from country to country. In some cases legislation mandates requirements; in others professional bodies impose accreditation standards. Many US universities offer graduate studies in mediation.

==== Australia ====
In Australia, there are two educational standards. One for entry level mediators and another for professionals wanting to become Family Dispute Resolution Practitioners (Family Law Mediators).

- Australian Mediator and Dispute Resolution Accreditation Standards (AMDRAS) replaced the National Mediator Accreditation System (NMAS) in 2024. The standards establish requirements for training, assessment, accreditation and ongoing professional practice.
- Family Dispute Resolution Practitioners (FDRPs) FDRPs must undertake a specific qualification CHC81115 - Graduate Diploma of Family Dispute Resolution or if they meet other specific educational requirements such as a qualification in law, social work or psychology and the core units from the Graduate Diploma. An equivalent to the core units course is available from some higher education providers. The qualification is approximately 800 hours and requires a 50-hour work placement.

Both levels of accreditation have requirements regarding ongoing professional development, professional indemnity insurance and good character.

Not all kinds of mediation-work require academic qualifications, as some deal more with practical skills than with theoretical knowledge. Membership organizations can be recognised under AMDRAS to provide training courses.

Internationally a similar approach to the training of mediators is taken by organizations such as the Centre for Effective Dispute Resolution, CEDR. Based in London, it has trained over 5000 CEDR mediators from different countries to date.

No legislated national standards on the level of education apply to all practitioners' organizations. However, organizations such as the National Alternative Dispute Resolution Advisory Council (NADRAC) advocate for a wide scope on such issues. Other systems apply in other jurisdictions such as Germany, which advocates a higher level of educational qualification for practitioners of mediation.

=== Codes of conduct ===
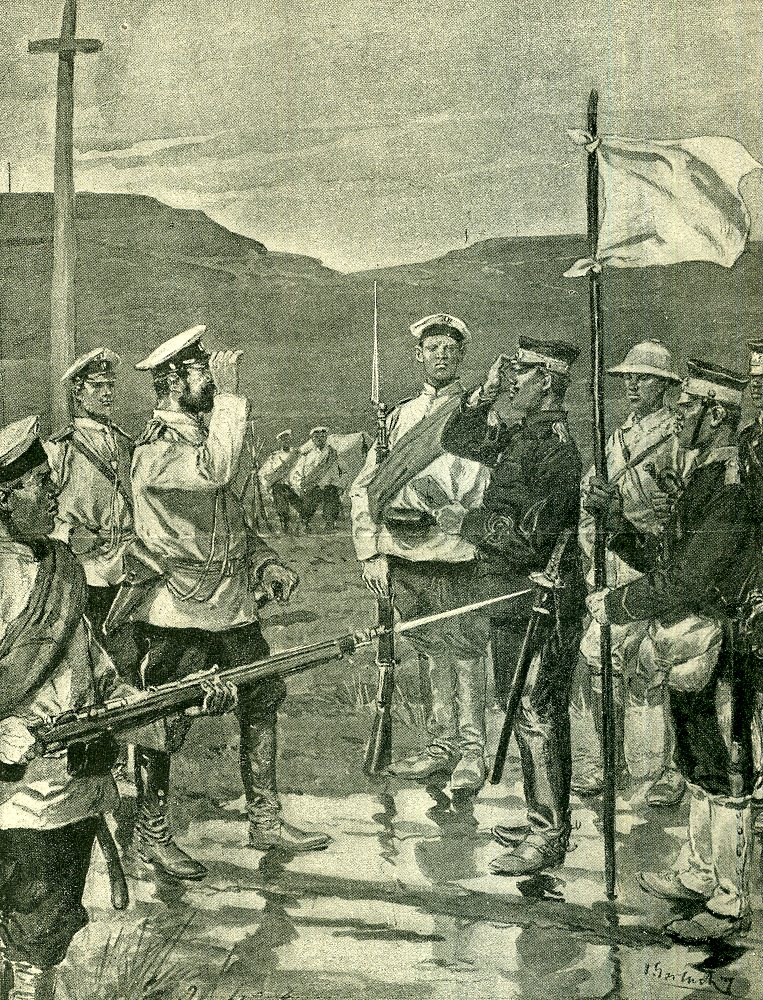
A 1904 illustration of a mediation scene from the Siege of Port Arthur, wherein Japanese parliamentarians negotiate a ceasefire in order to allow the burial of the dead

Common elements of codes of conduct include:

- informing participants as to the process of mediation
- adopting a neutral stance
- revealing any potential conflicts of interest
- maintaining confidentiality within the bounds of the law
- mindfulness of the psychological and physical wellbeing of all participants
- directing participants to appropriate sources for legal advice
- engaging in ongoing training
- practising only in those fields in which they have expertise.

==== Australia ====
In Australia mediation codes of conduct are articulated in the AMDRAS which includes practice expectations and a code of conduct superseding the NMAS in 2025.

A number of professional associations for mediators and law societies also have developed Codes of Conduct or similar.

Europe

The CPR/Georgetown Ethics Commission, the Mediation Forum of the Union International des Avocats, and the European Commission have promulgated codes of conduct for mediators.

==== Canada ====
In Canada codes of conduct for mediators are set by professional organizations. In Ontario three distinct professional organizations maintain codes of conduct for mediators. The Family Dispute Resolution Institute of Ontario and the Ontario Association of Family Mediators set standards for their members who mediate family matters and the Alternative Dispute Resolution Institute of Ontario who sets standards for their members.

The Alternative Dispute Resolution Institute of Ontario, a regional affiliate of the Alternative Dispute Resolution Institute of Canada, uses the code of conduct from the federal organization to regulate the conduct of its members. The Code's three objectives are to provide guiding principles for the conduct of mediators; to promote confidence in mediation as a process for resolving disputes; and to provide protection for members of the public who use mediators who are members of the institute.

In British Columbia, Mediate BC Society sets and maintains Standards of Conduct for its Registered Roster Mediators (RRMs) and Associates and Standards of Conduct for Med-Arbitrators on its Med-Arb roster. Mediate BC Society is a non-profit society that "serves and protects the public by promoting professionalism and quality in mediation and other collaborative dispute resolution processes."

==== France ====
In France, professional mediators have created an organization to develop a rational approach to conflict resolution. This approach is based on a "scientific" definition of a person and a conflict. These definitions help to develop a structured mediation process. Mediators have adopted a code of ethics which guarantees professionalism.

==== Germany ====
In Germany, the process and responsibilities of a mediator are legally defined in the Mediation Act 2012 (Mediationsgesetz). The Act codifies the general process (facilitation by a neutral, 3rd-party mediator without evaluation or solution proposals) and specific terms (e.g. funktionaler Mediator). Mediators have certain information and disclosure obligations as well as limitations of practice. In particular, a person who has previously provided any form of counseling to any party in the conflict (legal, social, financial, etc.) may not act as a mediator in the case. The Act applies to practitioners even if they refer to their approach not as mediation, but facilitation (Prozessbegleitung), conciliation (Schlichtung), conflict counseling (Konflikt-Beratung) or anything else.

=== Accreditation ===
==== Australia ====
A range of organisations within Australia accredit mediators under the standards set by AMDRAS.

The National Mediator Accreditation System (NMAS) commenced operation on 1 January 2008. It is an industry-based scheme which relies on voluntary compliance by mediator organisations that agree to accredit mediators in accordance with the requisite standards. It was replaced in 2024 - 2025 by the AMDRAS.

Mediator organisations have varying ideals of what makes a good mediator which reflect the training and accreditation of that particular organisation but to be recognised as AMDRAS training they must comply to certain norms.

==== Germany ====
According to sec. 6 German Mediation Act the German government on June 21, 2016, has released the German regulation about education and training of the so-called (legal term) "certified mediators" which from Sept. 1, 2017 postulates a minimum of 120 hours of initial specialized mediator training as well as case supervision and further ongoing training of 40 hours within 4 years. Beyond this basic qualification, the leading mediation associations (BAFM, BM, BMWA and DGM) have agreed on quality standards higher than the minimum standards of the national regulation to certify their mediators. To become an accredited mediator of these associations one has to complete an accredited mediation training program of a minimum of 200 hours incl. 30 hours of supervision as well as ongoing training (30–40 hours within three years)."

=== Selection ===
Mediator selection is of practical significance given varying models of mediation, mediators' discretion in structuring the process and the impact of the mediator's professional background and personal style on the result.

In community mediation programs the director generally assigns mediators. In New South Wales, for example, when the parties cannot agree on a mediator, the registrar contacts a nominating entity, such as the Bar Association which supplies the name of a qualified and experienced mediator.

As of 2006, formal mechanisms for objecting to the appointment of a particular mediator had not been established. Parties could ask the mediator to withdraw for reasons of conflict of interest. In some cases, legislation establishes criteria for mediators.

The Australian Attorney Generals Department maintains a register of registered Family Dispute Resolution Practitioners and Government Funded FDR Services located at www.fdrr.ag.gov.au

==== Criteria ====
The following are useful criteria for selecting a mediator:

- Personal attributes—patience, empathy, intelligence, optimism and flexibility
- Accreditation / Registration - In Australia - Registration as a FDRP for Family Law, Accreditation as a Mediator for other types of mediation
- Qualifications—knowledge of the theory and practice of conflict, negotiation and mediation, mediation skills.
- Experience— mediation experience, experience in the substantive area of dispute and personal life experience
- Training
- Professional background
- Certification and its value
- Suitability of the mediation model
- Disclosure of potential Conflicts of Interest
- Cost/fee

==== Third party nomination ====
Contracts that specify mediation may also specify a third party to suggest or impose an individual. Some third parties simply maintain a list of approved individuals, while others train mediators. Lists may be "open" (any person willing and suitably qualified can join) or a "closed" panel (invitation only).

In the UK and internationally, lists are generally open, such as The Chartered Institute of Arbitrators, the Centre for Effective Dispute Resolution. Alternatively, private panels co-exist and compete for appointments e.g., Savills Mediation.

=== Liability ===
Legal liability may stem from a mediation. For example, a mediator could be liable for misleading the parties or for even inadvertently breaching confidentiality. Despite such risks, follow-on court action is quite uncommon. Only one case reached that stage in Australia as of 2006. Damage awards are generally compensatory in nature. Proper training is mediators' best protection.

Liability can arise for the mediator from Liability in Contract; Liability in Tort; and Liability for Breach of Fiduciary Obligations.

Liability in Contract arises if a mediator breaches (written or verbal) contract with one or more parties. The two forms of breach are failure to perform and anticipatory breach. Limitations on liability include the requirement to show actual causation.

Liability in Tort arises if a mediator influences a party in any way (compromising the integrity of the decision), defames a party, breaches confidentiality, or most commonly, is negligent. To be awarded damages, the party must show actual damage, and must show that the mediator's actions (and not the party's actions) were the actual cause of the damage.

Liability for Breach of Fiduciary Obligations can occur if parties misconceive their relationship with a mediator as something other than neutrality. Since such liability relies on a misconception, court action is unlikely to succeed.

==== Tapoohi v Lewenberg (Australia) ====
As of 2008 Tapoohi v Lewenberg was the only case in Australia that set a precedent for mediators' liability.

The case involved two sisters who settled an estate via mediation. Only one sister attended the mediation in person: the other participated via telephone with her lawyers present. An agreement was executed. At the time it was orally expressed that before the final settlement, taxation advice should be sought as such a large transfer of property would trigger capital gains taxes.

Tapoohi paid Lewenberg $1.4 million in exchange for land. One year later, when Tapoohi realized that taxes were owed, she sued her sister, lawyers and the mediator based on the fact that the agreement was subject to further taxation advice.

The original agreement was verbal, without any formal agreement. Tapoohi, a lawyer herself, alleged that the mediator breached his contractual duty, given the lack of any formal agreement; and further alleged tortious breaches of his duty of care.

Although the court dismissed the summary judgment request, the case established that mediators owe a duty of care to parties and that parties can hold them liable for breaching that duty of care. Habersberger J held it "not beyond argument" that the mediator could be in breach of contractual and tortious duties. Such claims were required to be assessed at a trial court hearing.

This case emphasized the need for formal mediation agreements, including clauses that limit mediators' liability.

==== United States ====
Within the United States, the laws governing mediation vary by state. Some states have clear expectations for certification, ethical standards and confidentiality. Some also exempt mediators from testifying in cases they've worked on. However, such laws only cover activity within the court system. Community and commercial mediators practising outside the court system may not have such legal protections. State laws regarding lawyers may differ widely from those that cover mediators. Professional mediators often consider the option of liability insurance.

== Variants ==
=== Evaluative mediation ===
Evaluative mediation is focused on providing the parties with an evaluation of their case and directing them toward settlement. During an evaluative mediation process, when the parties agree that the mediator should do so, the mediator will express a view on what might be a fair or reasonable settlement. The Evaluative mediator has somewhat of an advisory role in that he/she evaluates the strengths and weaknesses of each side's argument and make some predictions about what would happen should they go to court. Facilitative and transformative mediators do not evaluate arguments or direct the parties to a particular settlement.

In Germany, due to national regulation "evaluative mediation" is seen as an oxymoron and not allowed by the German mediation Act. Therefore, in Germany mediation is purely facilitative. In Australia, the industry accepted definition of mediation involves a mediator adopting a non advisory and non determinative approach. However, there is also provision under the National Mediator Accreditation Standards for mediators to offer a 'blended' approach provided that participants consent to such a process in writing, the mediator is appropriately insured and has the expertise required.

=== Facilitative mediation ===
Facilitative mediators typically do not evaluate a case or direct the parties to a particular settlement. Instead, the Facilitative mediator facilitates the conversation. These mediators act as guardian of the process, not the content or the outcome. During a facilitative mediation session the parties in dispute control both what will be discussed and how their issues will be resolved. Unlike the transformative mediator, the facilitative mediator is focused on helping the parties find a resolution to their dispute and to that end, the facilitative mediator provides a structure and agenda for the discussion.

=== Transformative mediation ===
Transformative mediation looks at conflict as a crisis in communication. Success is not measured by settlement but by the parties shifts toward (a) personal strength, (b) interpersonal responsiveness, (c) constructive interaction, (d) new understandings of themselves and their situation, (e) critically examining the possibilities, (f) feeling better about each other, and (g) making their own decisions. Those decisions can include settlement agreements or not. Transformative mediation practice is focused on supporting empowerment and recognition shifts, by allowing and encouraging deliberation, decision-making, and perspective-taking. A competent transformative mediator practices with a microfocus on communication, identifying opportunities for empowerment and recognition as those opportunities appear in the parties' own conversations, and responding in ways that provide an opening for parties to choose what, if anything, to do with them.

=== Narrative mediation ===
The narrative approach to mediation shares with narrative therapy an emphasis on constructing stories as a basic human activity in understanding our lives and conflict. This approach emphasizes the sociological/psychological nature of conflict-saturated narratives, and values human creativity in acting and reacting to these narratives. "The narrative metaphor draws attention to the ways in which we use stories to make sense of our lives and our relationship." Narrative mediation advocates changing the way we speak about conflicts. In objectifying the conflict narrative, participants become less attached to the problem and more creative in seeking solutions. "The person is not the problem; the problem is the problem" according to narrative mediation.

=== Mediation with arbitration ===
Mediation has sometimes been utilized to good effect when coupled with arbitration, particularly binding arbitration, in a process called 'mediation/arbitration'. The process begins as a standard mediation, but if mediation fails, the mediator becomes an arbiter.

This process is more appropriate in civil matters where rules of evidence or jurisdiction are not in dispute. It resembles, in some respects, criminal plea-bargaining and Confucian judicial procedure, wherein the judge also plays the role of prosecutor—rendering what, in Western European court procedures, would be considered an arbitral (even 'arbitrary') decision.

Mediation/arbitration hybrids can pose significant ethical and process problems for mediators. Many of the options and successes of mediation relate to the mediator's unique role as someone who wields no coercive power over the parties or the outcome. The parties awareness that the mediator might later act in the role of judge could distort the process. Using a different individual as the arbiter addresses this concern.

=== Online ===
Online mediation employs online technology to provide disputants access to mediators and each other despite geographic distance, disability or other barriers to direct meeting. Online approaches also facilitate mediation when the value of the dispute does not justify the cost of face-to-face contact. Online mediation can also combine with face-to-face mediation—to allow mediation to begin sooner and/or to conduct preliminary discussions.

The global pandemic provided the opportunity for online mediation to expand and thrive with many mediators continue to offer their services fully or partially via online mediation.

=== Biased mediation ===
Various criteria exist to determine whether a mediator is biased, including their prejudices from before the mediation process, their performance during the mediation itself, and the end goal they pursue through their mediation. Neutral mediators enter into a conflict with the main intention in ending a conflict. This goal tends to hasten a mediator to reach a conclusion. Biased mediators enter into a conflict with specific biases in favor of one party or another. Biased mediators look to protect their parties interest thus leading to a better, more lasting resolution.

== Alternatives ==
Mediation is one of several approaches to resolving disputes. It differs from adversarial resolution processes by virtue of its simplicity, informality, flexibility, and economy. Mediation provides the opportunity for parties to agree terms and resolve issues by themselves, without the need for legal representation or court hearings.

Not all disputes lend themselves well to mediation. Success is unlikely unless:

- All parties are ready and willing to participate.
- All (or no) parties have legal representation. Mediation includes no right to legal counsel.
- All parties are of legal age (although see peer mediation) and are legally competent to make decisions.

=== Conciliation ===
Conciliation sometimes serves as an umbrella term that covers mediation and facilitative and advisory dispute-resolution processes. Neither process determines an outcome, and both share many similarities. For example, both processes involve a neutral third-party who has no enforcing powers.

One significant difference between conciliation and mediation lies in the fact that conciliators possess expert knowledge of the domain in which they conciliate. The conciliator can make suggestions for settlement terms and can give advice on the subject-matter. Conciliators may also use their role to actively encourage the parties to come to a resolution. In certain types of dispute the conciliator has a duty to provide legal information. This helps ensure that agreements comply with relevant statutory frameworks. Therefore, conciliation may include an advisory aspect.

Mediation is purely facilitative: the mediator has no advisory role. Instead, a mediator seeks to help parties to develop a shared understanding of the conflict and to work toward building a practical and lasting resolution.

Both mediation and conciliation work to identify the disputed issues and to generate options that help disputants reach a mutually satisfactory resolution. They both offer relatively flexible processes. Any settlement reached generally must have the agreement of all parties. This contrasts with litigation, which normally settles the dispute in favour of the party with the strongest legal argument. In-between the two operates collaborative law, which uses a facilitative process where each party has counsel.

=== Counselling ===
A counsellor generally uses therapeutic techniques. Some—such as a particular line of questioning—may be useful in mediation. But the role of the counsellor differs from the role of the mediator. The list below is not exhaustive but it gives an indication of important distinctions:

- A mediator aims for clear agreement between the participants as to how they will deal with specific issues. A counsellor is more concerned with the parties gaining a better self-understanding of their individual behaviour.
- A mediator, while acknowledging a person's feelings, does not explore them in any depth. A counsellor is fundamentally concerned about how people feel about a range of relevant experiences.
- A mediator focuses upon participants' future goals rather than a detailed analysis of past events. A counsellor may find it necessary to explore the past in detail to expose the origins and patterns of beliefs and behaviour.
- A mediator controls the process but does not overtly try to influence the participants or the actual outcome. A counsellor often takes an intentional role in the process, seeking to influence the parties to move in a particular direction or consider specific issues.
- A mediator relies on all parties being present to negotiate, usually face-to-face. A counsellor does not necessarily see all parties at the same time.
- A mediator is required to be neutral. A counsellor may play a more supportive role, where appropriate.
- Mediation requires both parties to be willing to negotiate. Counselling may work with one party even if the other is not ready or willing to participate.
- Mediation is a structured process that typically completes in one or a few sessions. Counselling tends to be ongoing, depending upon participants' needs and progress.

=== Early neutral evaluation ===
The technique of early neutral evaluation (ENE) have focus on market ineterships, and—based on that focus—offers a basis for sensible case-management or a suggested resolution of the entire case in its very early stages.

In early neutral evaluation, an evaluator acts as a neutral person to assess the strengths and weaknesses of each of the parties and to discuss the same with parties jointly or in caucuses, so that parties gain awareness (via independent evaluation) of the merits of their case.

Parties generally call on a senior counsel or on a panel with expertise and experience in the subject-matter under dispute in order to conduct ENE.

=== Arbitration ===
Binding Arbitration is a more direct substitute for the formal process of a court. Binding Arbitration is typically conducted in front of one or three arbitrators. The process is much like a mini trial with rules of evidence, etc. Arbitration typically proceeds faster than court and typically at a lower cost. The Arbiter makes the ultimate decision rather than the parties. Arbiters' decisions are typically final and appeals are rarely successful even if the decision appears to one party to be completely unreasonable.

=== Litigation ===
In litigation, courts impose their thoughts to both parties Courts in some cases refer litigants to mediation. Mediation is typically less costly, less formal and less complex. Unlike courts, mediation does not ensure binding agreements and the mediator does not decide the outcome.

=== Shuttle diplomacy ===
While mediation implies bringing disputing parties face-to-face with each other, the strategy of "shuttle diplomacy", where the mediator serves as a liaison between disputing parties, also sometimes occurs as an alternative.

== Philosophy ==
=== Conflict prevention ===
Mediation can anticipate difficulties between parties before conflict emerges. Complaint handling and management is a conflict prevention mechanism designed to handle a complaint effectively at first contact, minimising the possibility of a dispute. One term for this role is "dispute preventer".

=== Confidentiality ===
One of the hallmarks of mediation is that the process is strictly confidential. Two competing principles affect confidentiality. One principle encourages confidentiality to encourage people to participate, while the second principle states that all related facts should be available to courts.

The mediator must inform the parties of their responsibility for confidentiality.

Steps put in place during mediation to help ensure this privacy include:

1. All sessions take place behind closed doors.
2. Outsiders can observe proceedings only with both parties' consent.
3. The meeting is not recorded.
4. Publicity is prohibited.

Confidentiality is a powerful and attractive feature of mediation. It lowers the risk to participants of disclosing information and emotions and encourages realism by eliminating the benefits of posturing. In general, information discussed in mediation cannot be used as evidence in the event that the matter proceeds to court, in accord with the mediation agreement and common law.

Few mediations succeed unless the parties can communicate fully and openly without fear of compromising a potential court case. The promise of confidentiality mitigates such concerns. Organisations often see confidentiality as a reason to use mediation in lieu of litigation, particularly in sensitive areas. This contrasts with the public nature of courts and other tribunals. However mediation need not be private and confidential. In some circumstances the parties agree to open the mediation in part or whole. Laws may limit confidentiality. For example, mediators must disclose allegations of physical or other abuse to authorities. The more parties in a mediation, the less likely that perfect confidentiality will be maintained. Some parties may even be required to give an account of the mediation to outside constituents or authorities.

Most countries respect mediator confidentiality.

==== Without-prejudice privilege ====
The without-prejudice privilege in common law denotes that in honest attempts to reach settlement, any offers or admissions cannot be used in court when the subject matter is the same. This applies to the mediation process. The rule comes with exceptions.

The without-prejudice privilege does not apply if it was excluded by either party or if the privilege was waived in proceedings. Although mediation is private and confidential, the disclosure of privileged information in the presence of a mediator does not represent a waiver of the privilege.

=== Legal implications ===
Parties who enter into mediation do not forfeit legal rights or remedies. If mediation does not result in settlement, each side can continue to enforce their rights through appropriate court or tribunal procedures. However, if mediation produces a settlement, legal rights and obligations are affected in differing degrees. In some situations, the parties may accept a memorandum or moral force agreement; these are often found in community mediations. In other instances, a more comprehensive deed of agreement, when registered with a court, is legally binding. It is advisable to have a lawyer draft or provide legal advice about the proposed terms.

"Court systems are eager to introduce mandatory mediation as a means to meet their needs to reduce case loads and adversarial litigation, and participants who understand the empowerment of mediation to self-determine their own agreements are equally as eager to embrace mediation as an alternative to costly and potentially harmful litigation."

== Principles ==
Principles of mediation include non-adversarialism, responsiveness, self-determination and party autonomy.

Non-adversarialism is based on the actual process of mediation. It treats the parties as collaborating in the construction of an agreement. By contrast, litigation is explicitly adversarial in that each party attempts to subject the other to its views. Mediation is designed to conclude with an agreement rather than a winner and loser.

Responsiveness reflects the intent to allow the parties to craft a resolution outside of the strict rules of the legal system. A responsive mediation process also is informal, flexible and collaborative.

Self-determination and party autonomy allow and require parties to choose the area of agreement, rather than ceding the decision to an outside decision-maker such as a judge. This turns the responsibility for the outcome onto the parties themselves.

In the United States, mediator codes-of-conduct emphasize "client-directed" solutions rather than imposed solutions. This has become a common, definitive feature of mediation in the US and UK.

== Ethics ==
Theorists, notably Rushworth Kidder, who founded the Institute for Global Ethics in 1980, claimed that mediation is the foundation of a 'postmodern' ethics—and that it sidesteps traditional ethical issues with pre-defined limits of morality.

Mediation can also be seen as a form of harm reduction or de-escalation, especially in its large-scale application in peace and similar negotiations, or the bottom-up way it is performed in the peace movement where it is often called mindful mediation. This form derived from methods of Quakers in particular.

== Conflict management ==
Society perceives conflict as something that one should resolve as quickly as possible. Mediators see conflict as a fact of life that when properly managed can benefit the parties. The benefits of conflict include the opportunity to renew relationships and make positive changes for the future.

== Role in nonviolent conflict resolution ==
Mediation can be used as a tool in nonviolent conflict resolution by enabling people to resolve conflict, express their needs, and build understanding without the use of violence. Mediation creates a structured space for dialogue where parties can express their perspectives and interests, and may reduce escalation that is fueled by misunderstanding or mistrust. Mediation is not only about resolving a single or small set of disputes, but it can model nonviolent communication, teach collaborative problem-solving skills, and strengthen a community's capacity to address future conflicts, ultimately supporting a culture that is less dependent on punitive systems and that provides individuals and communities with greater opportunities to self-govern conflict and its resolution. By creating a space where parties can articulate harms and create agreements that address such harms by voluntary means, mediation reinforces the idea that accountability is not the same as punishment. Mediation also serves as an alternative process to address conflict through a faster, more accessible, and participatory approach that does not rely on formal systems that can further perpetuate harm, such as courts and policing.

== See also ==
- Adjudicator
- Conflict management style
- Conflict style inventory
- Family therapy
- Forum (alternative dispute resolution)
- Intercultural competence
- Intermediary
- Lawyer supported mediation
- Liaison officer
- Life coaching
- Nonviolent communication
- Ombudsman
- UN Peacemaker
