= California State University, Stanislaus =

Public university in Turlock, California, US

Coordinates: 37°31′30″N 120°51′21″W

- Former name: Stanislaus State College (1957–85)
- Motto: Vox Veritas Vita (Latin) "Engaging, Empowering, Transforming"
- Motto in English: "Voice Truth Life"
- Type: Public university
- Established: 1957; 69 years ago
- Parent institution: California State University
- Accreditation: WSCUC
- Endowment: $ 22.4 million (2024-25)
- Budget: $ 177.6 million (2024-25)
- President: Britt Rios-Ellis
- Students: 9,398 (Fall 2025)
- Undergraduates: 8,293 (Fall 2025)
- Postgraduates: 1,105 (Fall 2025)
- Location: Turlock, California, United States
- Campus: 228 acres (92 ha); Small suburb
- Other campuses: Los Banos; Modesto; Moss Landing; Stockton; Tracy
- Newspaper: Signal
- Colors: Red and gold
- Nickname: Warriors
- Sporting affiliations: NCAA Division II – CCAA; PacWest
- Mascot: Titus
- Website: csustan.edu

California State University, Stanislaus (Stanislaus State, Stan State) is a public university in Turlock, California, United States. It is part of the California State University system. It was established in 1957 and offers 45 bachelor's degree programs and 38 graduate programs, which include 22 master's degree programs, one doctoral degree (Doctor of Education), 10 certificate programs, and 5 teaching credentials. Stanislaus State is a Hispanic-serving institution.

== History ==
In 1957, the California State Legislature established what was then called Stanislaus State College as the 15th campus of the CSU system. Because Turlock was better known at the time for its turkeys than its aspirations towards higher education, Clark Kerr highlighted this event in his memoirs as an example of how the state colleges had become vulnerable to pork barrel politics in the state legislature. This was one of several reasons behind the creation of the California Master Plan for Higher Education of 1960.

Classes began on the Stanislaus County Fairgrounds in September, 1960, and the college moved to its current location five years later. The college was first accredited in 1964. It gained university status and its current name in 1986.

In 1974, the university established an extension program at the campus of San Joaquin Delta College in Stockton in neighboring San Joaquin County. In 1998 the Stanislaus State-Stockton Center expanded and moved to its own permanent campus in downtown Stockton, located at the closed Stockton State Hospital.

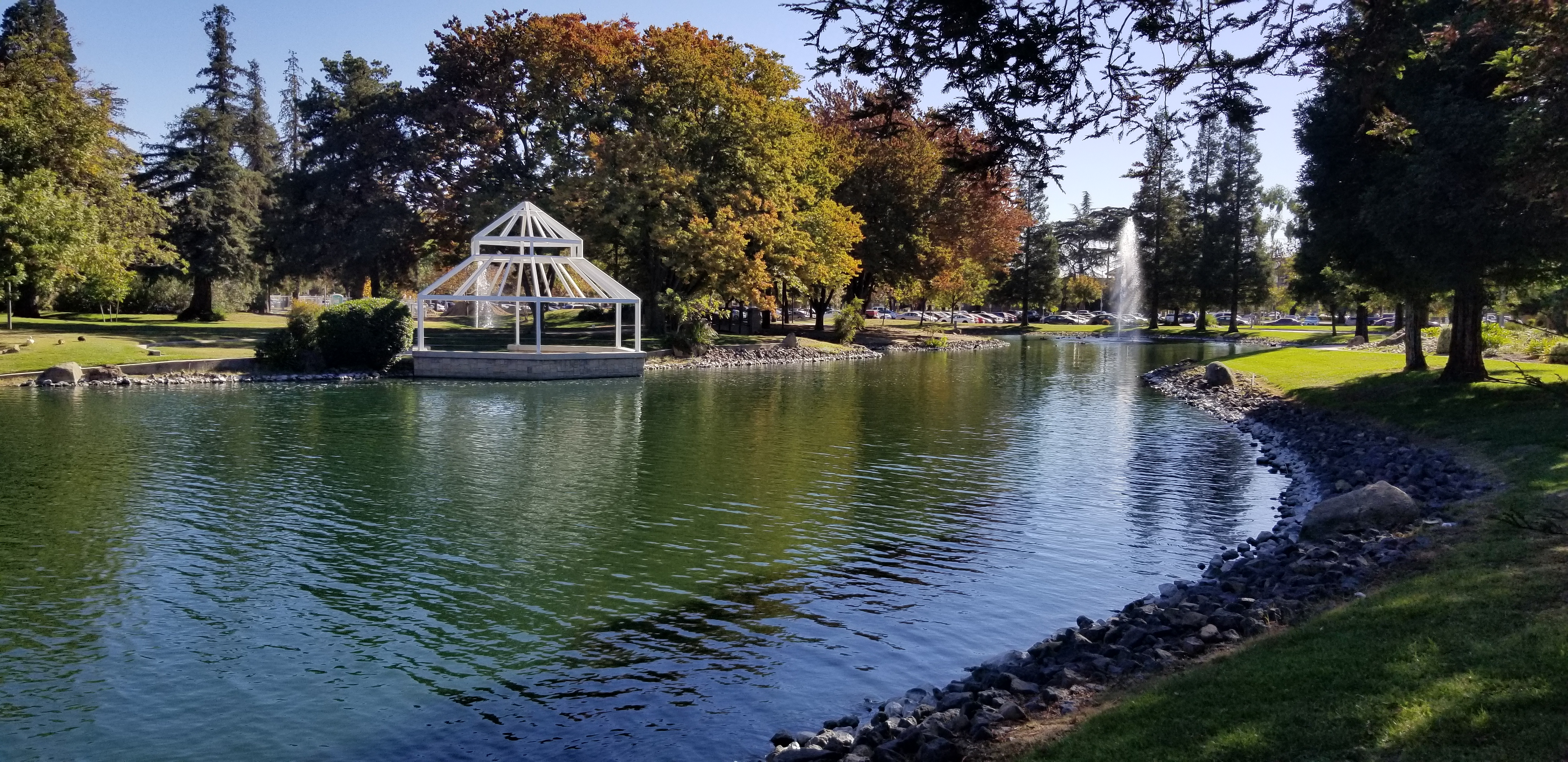
Sequoia Lake at CSU Stanislaus

Sarah Palin was selected as the keynote speaker at Stanislaus State's main fundraising event in 2010. Sponsored by a school foundation, the event resulted in the most successful fundraiser in the campus's history. It provoked speculation and debate when the university refused to disclose her speaking fee. A resulting investigation by the Attorney General of California Jerry Brown found no violation of law, but recommended accounting and oversight improvements in the foundation's practices.

== Academics ==
Undergraduate admission statistics
	Fall 2025	Fall 2024	Fall 2023	Fall 2022	Fall 2021
First-time Freshmen
Applicants	5,472	5,627	5,482	6,345	5,740
Admits	5,195	5,318	5,199	5,871	5,439
Admit rate	95%	95%	95%	93%	95%
Enrolled	1,061	1,018	1,046	1,032	951
Yield rate	20%	19%	20%	18%	17%
Transfers
Applicants	3,327	3,420	3,423	3,872	4,312
Admits	3,000	3,109	3,122	3,449	3,903
Admit rate	90%	91%	91%	89%	91%
Enrolled	1,396	1,392	1,289	1,375	1,386
Yield rate	47%	45%	41%	40%	36%

As of 2024, California State University, Stanislaus offers 59 undergraduate programs, 8 graduate certificate programs, 23 master's degree programs, 7 school credential programs, and a doctoral degree program in Educational Leadership. Its academic disciplines are clustered within four colleges:

- College of the Arts, Humanities and Social Sciences
- College of Business Administration
- College of Education, Kinesiology and Social Work
- College of Science

Several individual programs, across the four colleges, have achieved and maintain accreditation by professional accreditation bodies. Stanislaus State's College of Business Administration is accredited by the AACSB. Its Human Resource Management program has the nation's top student testing success rate. In fall 2012, Stanislaus State launched an online Master of Business Administration (MBA) degree program, the first fully online AACSB-accredited MBA program offered in the state of California.

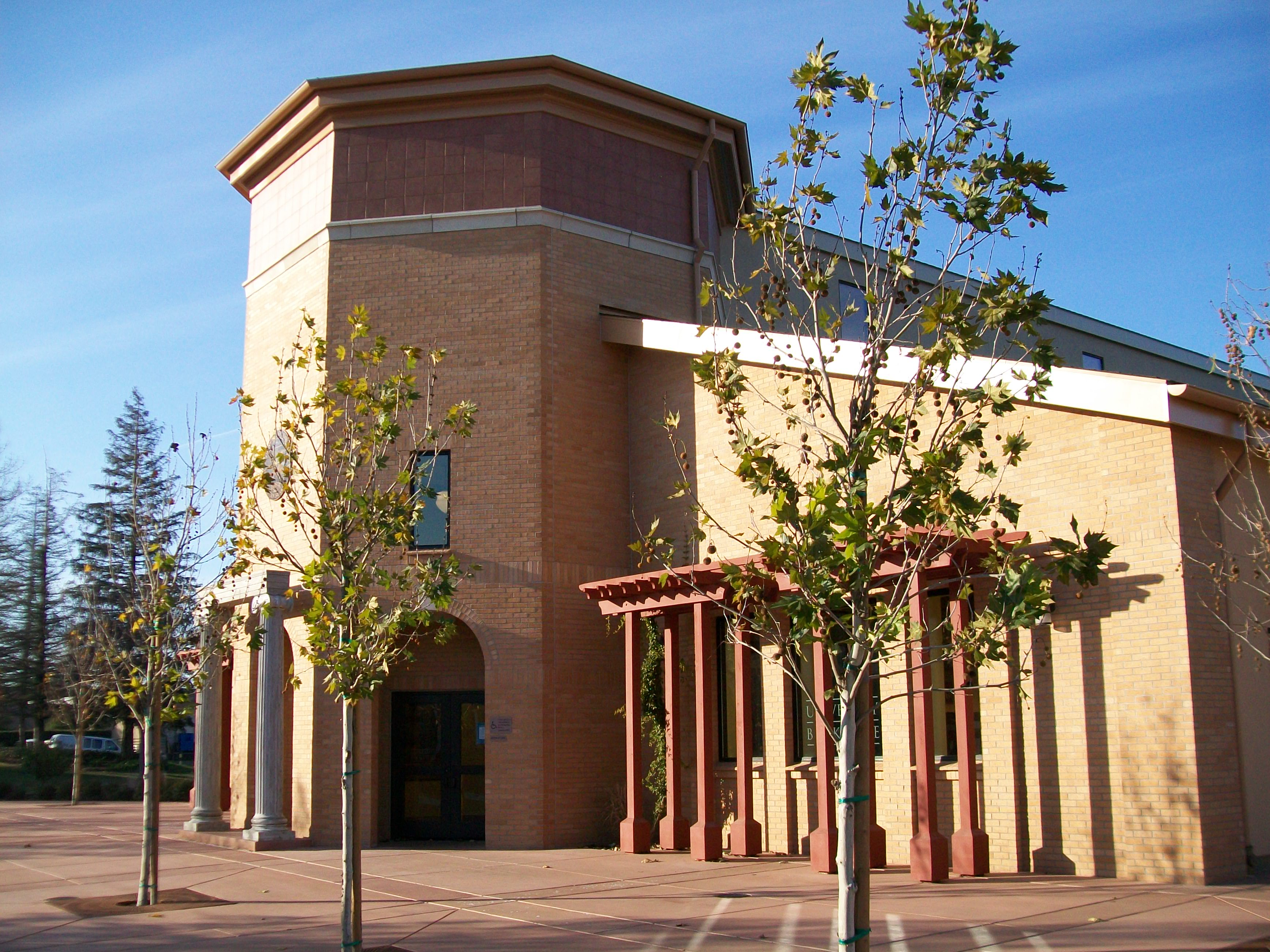
The California State University, Stanislaus Event Center

The university library building was originally named for founding president Dr. J. Burton Vasché. The library currently holds over 300,000 volumes, over 30,000 online periodicals, and 215 electronic databases, and serves as a selective depository for federal and state publications. The library also contains the Dr. Armin Schulz Children's Literature Collection and the Francis Sarguis Modern Assyrian Heritage Collection.

As of fall 2017, the five most popular bachelor's degrees Programs are BS Business Administration, BA Psychology, BA Liberal Studies, BA/BS Biological Sciences, and BA Criminal Justice.

The university has several resources available for students. The Tutoring/Writing Center is located in the Vasché Library and offers individual and group tutoring. Some of the services available include essay planning, organization, development and revision, writing across the curriculum, ESL, and WPST test preparation. The university also has a bookstore that features marble herms by sculptor Andrew Wilson alongside other artwork, as well as a university police department and financial aid office. The New Stanislaus State Student Center is scheduled to open Spring 2020.

== Rankings ==
Academic rankings

Master's
- Washington Monthly: 5

Regional
- U.S. News & World Report: 9

National
- Forbes: 301
- WSJ/College Pulse: 501–600

2025-2026 USNWR Regional Universities West rankings
Top Performers on Social Mobility	3
Top Public Schools	6
Best Colleges for Veterans	7
Best Value Schools	13
Nursing	294

2024-2025 USNWR Graduate School Rankings
Program	Ranking
Social Work	172 (tie)
Part-time MBA	207
Public Affairs Programs	217

The 2026 Wall Street Journal 2026 Best Colleges in the U.S. ranked Stanislaus #21 out of 584 nationwide, including #4 in social mobility and #14 in best value.

The 2026 U.S. News & World Report Best Regional Universities West Rankings ranked Stanislaus #9 overall, #3 on Social Mobility, #6 on Top Public Schools, and #7 on for best Colleges for Veterans. Within the entire nation, the 2026 U.S. News & World Report ranked Stanislaus #294 in Nursing.

The Washington Monthly 2025 Master's University Rankings listed Cal State Stanislaus as #5 out of 585 institutions nationwide, and 11th for "Best Bang for the Buck" out of 197 schools in the U.S. western region.

== Athletics ==
Stanislaus State, in the Division II of the NCAA, competes in the California Collegiate Athletic Association (CCAA). Stanislaus State fields 14 sports for men and women for the fall, winter, and spring seasons. Fall sports for men include soccer and cross country. Fall sports for women are soccer, volleyball and cross country. The winter sport for men is basketball and for women it is basketball and indoor track and field. Spring sports for men include baseball, golf, and track and field. Spring sports for women include softball, track and field, and tennis. Stan State also sponsors a competitive cheer team, which has competed at the NCA National Championships since 2017. Besides both being located in the east of California, but one in the south and the other in the north, Stanislaus and San Bernardino have competed heavily as conference rivals.

=== Ed & Bertha Fitzpatrick Arena ===
Ed & Bertha Fitzpatrick Arena (aka Warrior Gym) is a 2,000-seat multi-purpose, built in 1978, which is the home arena for the university's Warriors basketball and volleyball teams. It was also briefly the home of the defunct Big Valley Shockwave of the American Basketball Association. In the 2010–2011 season the name of the basketball arena was changed to Ed & Bertha Fitzpatrick Arena.

== Student life ==
Undergraduate demographics as of Fall 2023
Race and ethnicity	Total
Hispanic	63%
White	17%
Asian	9%
Unknown	4%
Black	3%
Two or more races	3%
Native Hawaiian/Pacific Islander	1%
Economic diversity
Low-income (Note: The percentage of students who received an income-based federal Pell grant intended for low-income students.)	57%
Affluent (Note: The percentage of students who are a part of the American middle class at the bare minimum.)	43%

The university has a Hmong Students Association. In 2004 the association and a former member led the Project Ready for School to help children arriving in the United States from a Thai refugee camp for preparing for school.

As of fall 2018 CSU Stanislaus had the third largest enrollment percentage of Mexican Americans in the California State University system.

=== Sororities and fraternities ===
Greek life at CSUS includes several fraternities and sororities.

== Notable people ==
=== Alumni ===
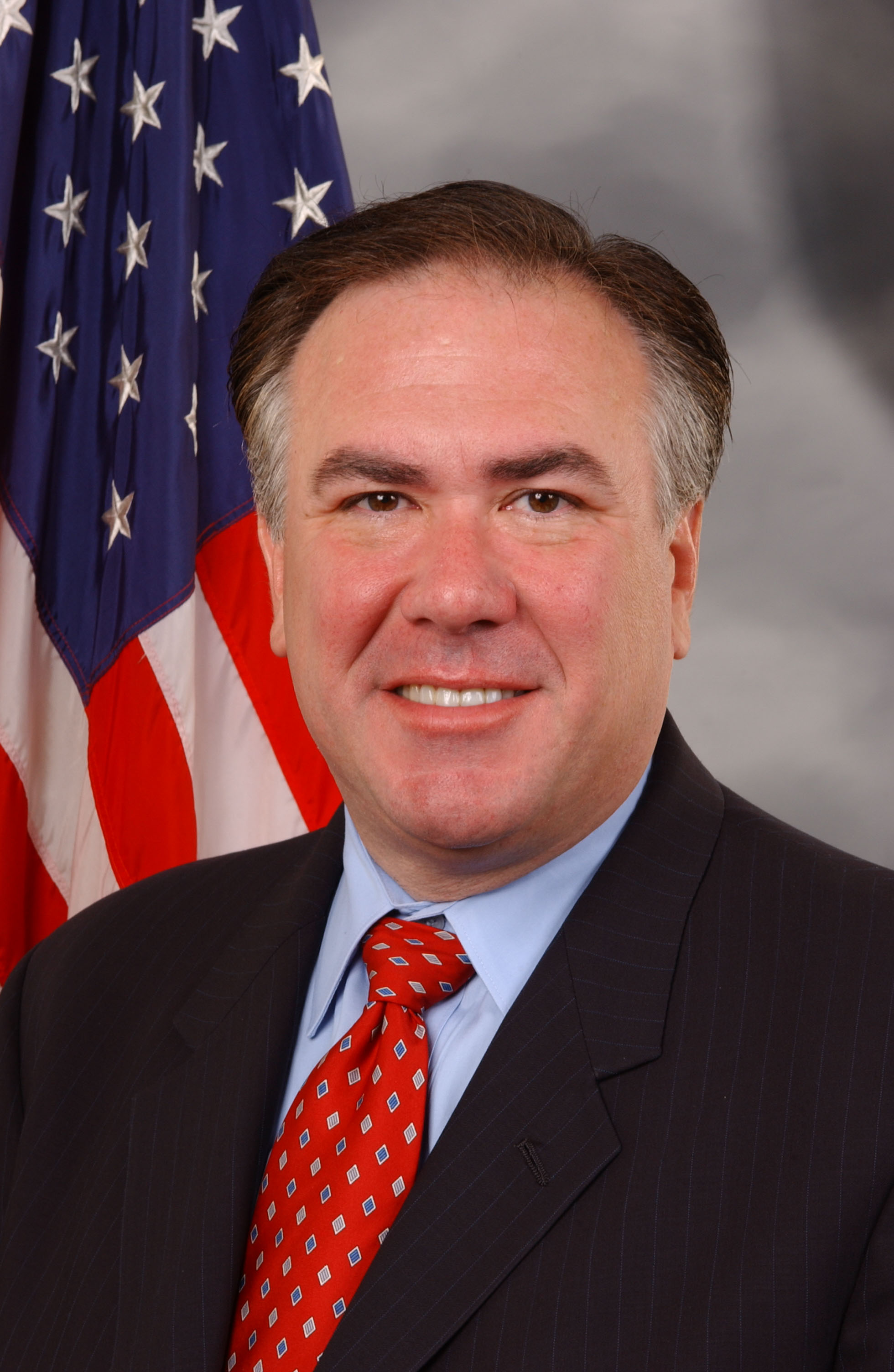
Dennis Cardoza

- Susan Eggman – state senator
- Nancy Stoyer – scientist
- Steve Andrade – baseball player
- Gregorio Billikopf – professor
- Dennis Cardoza – U.S. Representative for California's 18th congressional district
- Gary Condit (B.A., 1972) – former Congressman from California, initially implicated in the Chandra Levy murder case, before being cleared
- Leo Dottavio – reality television personality, actor, and comedian, known for his performance on The Bachelorette Season 14
- Carrie Henn – child actress who starred in Aliens
- Lee Herrick – California Poet Laureate
- Rusty Kuntz – former Major League Baseball outfielder and 1984 World Series Champion; current Kansas City first base coach
- Dave Lanphear – comic book artist
- Rico Oller (1980) – former state senator
- Jasmine Sandlas – playback singer, television personality, performer, and songwriter
- Joe Ryan (baseball) – baseball player
- Joel Stallworth — track and field athlete
- Robert J. Ulrich (casting director) – casting director, producer and former host of the show The Glee Project
- Kim Johnston Ulrich – actor

=== Faculty ===
- As'ad AbuKhalil – Professor of Political Science
- Richard Weikart – Professor Emeritus of History, fellow at the Discovery Institute
- Kou Yang – Professor Emeritus of Asian American Studies
