= Ralph H. Kilmann =

Ralph Kilmann
- Born: Ralph H. Kilmann
- Citizenship: American
- Education: Tepper School of Business; Carnegie Mellon University
- Occupations: Management consultant, educator, and author
- Known for: Co-authored the Thomas–Kilmann Conflict Mode Instrument

Ralph Kilmann is an American management consultant, educator, and author. He co-authored the Thomas–Kilmann Conflict Mode Instrument, a framework for understanding conflict based on five 'modes' of conflict responses: competing, accommodating, avoiding, collaborating, and compromising.

== Bibliography ==
- Ralph H. Kilmann with Louis R. Pondy and Dennis P. Slevin (Eds.), The Management of Organizational Design: Volume I, Strategy and Implementation, North-Holland, New York, 1976.
- Ralph H. Kilmann with Louis R. Pondy and Dennis P. Slevin (Eds.), The Management of Organizational Design: Volume II, Research and Methodology, North-Holland, New York, 1976.
- Ralph H. Kilmann, Social Systems Design: Normative Theory and the MAPS Design Technology, North-Holland, New York, 1977.
- Ralph H. Kilmann and Ian I. Mitroff, Methodological Approaches to Social Science: Integrating Divergent Concepts and Theories, Jossey-Bass, San Francisco, 1978.
- Ralph H. Kilmann with Kenneth W. Thomas, Dannis P. Slevin, Raghu Nath, and S. Lee Jerrell (Eds.), Producing Useful Knowledge for Organizations, Praeger, New York, 1983.
- Ralph H. Kilmann, Beyond the Quick Fix: Managing Five Tracks to Organizational Success, Jossey-Bass, San Francisco, 1984.
- Ralph H. Kilmann with Ian I. Mitroff, Corporate Tragedies: Product Tampering, Sabotage, and Other Catastrophes, Praeger, New York, 1984.
- Ralph H. Kilmann with Mary J. Saxton, Roy Serpa, and Associates, Gaining Control of the Corporate Culture, Jossey-Bass, San Francisco, 1985.
- Ralph H. Kilmann with Teresa Joyce Covin and Associates, Corporate Transformation: Revitalizing Organizations for a Competitive World, Jossey-Bass, San Francisco, 1988.
- Ralph H. Kilmann, Managing Beyond the Quick Fix: A Completely Integrated Program for Creating and Maintaining Organizational Success, Jossey-Bass, San Francisco, 1989.
- Ralph H. Kilmann, Escaping the Quick Fix Trap: How to Make Organizational Improvements That Really Last, Audiobook, Jossey-Bass, San Francisco, 1989.
- Ralph H. Kilmann with Associates, Making Organizations Competitive: Enhancing Networks and Relationships Across Traditional Boundaries, Jossey-Bass, San Francisco, 1991.
- Ralph H. Kilmann, Workbook for Implementing the Tracks: Volume I, II, and III, Kilmann Diagnostics, Newport Coast, CA, 1991.
- Ralph H. Kilmann, Logistics Manual for Implementing the Tracks: Planning and Organizing Workshop Sessions, Kilmann Diagnostics, Newport Coast, CA, 1991.
- Ralph H. Kilmann with Associates, Managing Ego Energy: The Transformation of Personal Meaning into Organizational Success, Jossey-Bass, San Francisco, 1994.
- Ralph H. Kilmann, Quantum Organizations: A New Paradigm for Achieving Organizational Success and Personal Meaning, Davies-Black, Palo Alto, CA, 2001.
- Ralph H. Kilmann, The Courageous Mosaic: Awakening Society, Systems and Souls, Kilmann Diagnostics, Newport Coast, CA, 2013.
- Ralph H. Kilmann with Ian I. Mitroff, The Psychodynamics of Enlightened Leadership: Coping with Chaos, Springer, New York, 2021.
- Ralph H. Kilmann, Creating a Quantum Organization: The Whys & Hows of Implementing Eight Tracks for Long-Term Success, Kilmann Diagnostics, Newport Coast, CA, 2021.
