= Conflict management style =

Process of handling disputes

Conflict management is the process of handling disputes and disagreements between two or more parties when their goals, beliefs, perspectives, or values are incompatible. Managing conflict is said to decrease the amount of tension; if a conflict is poorly managed, it can create more issues than the original conflict. The struggle may impede the ability to accomplish predetermined goals and objectives. Five modes are offered as solutions to managing a conflict, with each mode ranked on scales of assertiveness and cooperativeness. Assertiveness is the extent to which an individual attempts to satisfy their concerns, while cooperativeness is their willingness to satisfy other parties. Studies have been conducted on the modes of conflict management and their effects on relationships.

A model called the "Thomas-Kilmann model" was designed by two psychologists, Kenneth Thomas and Ralph Kilmann. It demonstrates how individuals display conflict management styles when they handle disagreement. The Thomas-Kilmann model suggests five modes that guide individuals in resolving conflicts. These are collaborating, competing, compromising, accommodating, and avoiding.

- Collaborating means both sides are willing to cooperate and listen to others.
- Competing means standing up for one's rights and defending what one believes is correct.
- Compromising means the parties seek a better, mutually-acceptable solution, finding "a middle ground".
- Accommodating means that one party yields to another's point of view.
- Avoiding is where a solution is delayed or avoided altogether.

The Thomas-Kilmann model was used as the basis for the Baumoel-Trippe (BT) Extension, which was created by Blair Trippe and Douglas Baumoel. The BT Extension takes into account what happens if the relationship is negative and is used, mainly, in situations where the parties involved are experiencing an identity conflict. This model is used as the basis to identify what identity concerns each party has in the conflict, as “threats to identity are existential threats that can curtail rational thought…finding common interests… are not enough.” It is the belief of Baumoel and Trippe that by understanding the underlying identity conflicts, negotiations and eventual remediation will be more effective.

- Sabotaging happens when the subject is important to an individual, but the relationship is very negative.
- Excluding happens when the subject is moderately important and the relationship is moderately negative.
- Blocking happens when the subject is not important, but the relationship is more than moderately negative.

Within the BT Extension, it is suggested that “it is the motivation of the person who acts that is important, not the act itself.”

== Background ==
Conflict is usually found in an individualistic culture, where competition and individual achievement is stressed over interdependence. Communication is often seen as crucial to maintaining a healthy relationship, and the way one resolves conflict is important to maintaining healthy relationships.

Thomas and Kilmann proposed five modes of conflict management, developed from 1960 to 1975, which can be used to handle particular conflicts. The United States Institute for Peace has published a free modified version of the Thomas-Kilmann test. In that test collaborating is called problem solving.

The various conflict style inventories do not do a great job of taking into account power differences, such as age, race, or employment position.

== Conflict modes ==
Conflict management styles

=== Collaborating ===
According to Thomas and Kilmann, collaborating is mutual problem solving that aims to satisfy the needs of all parties. This mode ranks high on both the assertiveness and cooperativeness scales. This mode can be facilitated when personal relationships are close, because such individuals are apt to dig deeper to find the root of the conflict and alternate solutions. One learns the other party's insights to try to find a creative solution to the conflict. This mode is best used when one needs an integrative solution, because all parties needs are too important to not be addressed, and because one wants to combine insights, or work through hard feelings in the relationship. However, if time or scale is concerned, collaborative conflict management can be both time-consuming and emotionally draining, due to its intensive nature. Collaboration is required from both parties to come to a logical conclusion. Furthermore, to obtain effective results, parties should be well experienced and capable of discussing their needs and wants. This conflict style is not good for solving smaller, more trivial issues due to its in-depth nature.

=== Competing ===
The competing mode is one in which each individual prioritizes their own position; it is assertive and often results in one-sided communication. In this mode the individual will be standing up for their rights, defending their position, or simply trying to win. Competitiveness can exasperate the initial conflict and potentially harm a close relationship. This mode is typically used when a quick decision needs to be made, when someone needs to protect themselves, or when someone believes their point of view is wholly correct. Participants in this mode may be closed off to accepting others' ideas, and use of this mode does not always arrive at a permanent solution; in fact, it can escalate the issues instead. Although this may be true, when speaking to larger groups professionally, one can more easily gain trust and success.

=== Compromising ===
Compromising requires making concessions; both parties will give up a goal or need in order to resolve the conflict. This mode is intermediate in terms of assertiveness and cooperativeness. Compromising is similar to collaborating in that one finds a mutually beneficial solution to the problem. The difference is that compromising does address the issue, but it doesn't seek the root of the conflict, as is done in collaborating. Compromising is used when issues are important but not worth taking an assertive approach, one wants a temporary fix, or when collaboration or competing fail. Some pros of compromising as a mode of conflict management include: all parties can get some form of satisfaction, it facilitates constructive communication, helps maintain relationships, and the group's power dynamics remain the same. On the other hand if there are no boundaries and an unbalanced power dynamic it can be difficult to find a solution. Some negatives of this method may include: if someone is not willing to compromise, it does not work, no party is fully satisfied, outcomes are less creative, less passion and effort is involved ("easy way out"), and is more likely a temporary solution.

=== Accommodating ===
Rather than trying to impose one's own point of view, in the accommodating mode an individual satisfies the other parties goals while being unassertive and cooperative. When accommodating, an individual sacrifices their own needs in order to leave the other party content. This can be good in a relational sense, but can also lead to the party that is making sacrifices becoming burnt out. Accommodation can be appropriate when the accommodator knows they are wrong, possibly needs to build up credit for a later situation that may be more important to them, or would rather just keep the peace. Accommodators seek to preserve personal relationships with others. Accommodation often leads to an imbalance in the power dynamic of a relationship, where the person accommodating has less power, and their needs are not met. Alternatively, the accommodator may feel that the responsibility falls on them to solve all issues in the relationship. Accommodating can be useful for settling inconsequential and trivial conflicts. Resentment is a possible outcome when accommodation is used to settle conflicts frequently, due to needs consistently not being met. Resulting resentment could be internal, towards the other party, or between parties.

=== Avoiding ===
Main article: Conflict avoidance

The avoiding mode simply averts conflict by postponing or steering clear of it. This style is used when the relationships importance and goals are low. Often, this style is viewed as having low regard for both the issue at hand and your relationship with the other party. This style is unassertive and uncooperative. Avoiding is stepping out of the way, delaying, or simply avoiding a situation. This mode can be beneficial in moderation, but eventually, ignoring conflicts could lead to a build-up of tension and unhealthy relationships. This mode tends to be adopted when one finds an issue unimportant, the issue could resolve itself in time, or another problem is more pressing. This mode can also be beneficial when emotions are running high, and one or both parties need time to calm down before addressing the conflict at hand.

=== Sabotaging ===
Sabotaging happens when the relationship between individuals is extremely negative, and the issue or point of conflict is critical. This can range from deleting information on a group project, stopping proposals made by the other party, scheduling meetings when the other party will be late or absent; anything that will cause the other party to lose credibility would count as sabotage. This strategy has two main goals: to undermine the disliked individual, and to promote ones own goals without opposition. To clarify further, if the relationship between two parties is not inherently negative, this behavior would more than likely switch to a more competitive style (as previously explained in the TK Model).

=== Blocking ===
Blocking happens when the subject is relatively non-critical, but the relationship is very negative. This often presents as shutting out the other party in whatever manner is possible. This could present as not showing up when their vote is crucial to a plan, or removing an item from a meeting agenda so it never gets discussed. This is designed to stop the halt the progress of another and to cause harm to the goals of that party.

=== Excluding ===
Excluding happens when the relationship is slightly negative, but the issue at hand is moderately important. This can present in two ways, by either physically excluding the other party, or by excluding oneself from decision-making processes. Either presentation can look like not including the other party on emails or in communications, not responding to communication attempts from the other party, not sharing information on projects, or setting up meetings when the other party is known to be busy. The goal from this style is to remove the other party from decision-making and stop them from interfering with one’s own goals.

== Studies on conflict management ==
=== Conflict management within the workplace ===
Within the workplace, conflict is normal and unavoidable. Employees have different personalities, values, communication styles, and backgrounds, which may lead to conflict and often times do. Effective conflict management depends on understanding individual differences and using appropriate strategies such as avoidance, coercion, or collaborative problem solving. People’s thinking styles influence their conflict management decisions. A study conducted by Rosa Hendijani and Ahmadi Mohammad Milad proposes that rational, analytical thinking may lead to more constructive conflict management than impulsive, experiential thinking. For the study, 240 management students and managers had to respond to workplace conflict across different scenarios. Results showed that individuals with stronger rational thinking skills performed significantly better at managing conflict than those who relied more on experiential or intuitive thinking.

=== Cross-cultural studies ===
In a study written in the Management International Review different subcultures in Turkey were studied in regard to the modes of conflict management they prefer to use. Although this study took place in Turkey, it opened up the door for cross-cultural research into conflict management. The study defined each of the five modes as to how it scored in regard to assertiveness and competitiveness: competing is high in assertiveness, collaborating is high in both, accommodating is high in cooperativeness, avoiding is low in both, and compromise is the midpoint. Researchers studied the choice of mode and what influenced that choice, using Schwartz's inventory of value. What they found was that the traditional main culture used the avoiding style, the power-seeking culture preferred competing, and egalitarians chose accommodation. This study shows that there is a correlation between cultures and their chosen modes of conflict management, and not every culture uses only one mode.

=== Conflict in romantic relationships ===
Conflict is an important part of relationship development and maintenance. In a study of over 250 undergraduate communication students, John Siegert and Glen Stamp examined the "First Big Fight" (FBF) in romantic relationships. Through surveys and interviews, they found that the FBF often serves as a major turning point that can either strengthen a relationship or contribute to its end, depending on the circumstances and partners' perceptions of the relationship.

Conflict also plays a key role in marriage. A study was conducted using questionnaires completed by married individuals to examine how relational power affects the decision to express or withhold complaints. The findings showed that spouses who perceived themselves as having more power were more likely to voice concerns, while partners were more likely to withhold information when their spouse displayed aggressive behavior. Together, these studies demonstrate that the way couples manage conflict can have a significant impact on relationship satisfaction and stability.

== Application ==
Conflict management styles are applied in many areas of everyday life, including interpersonal or romantic relationships, workplaces, and within culture and community interactions. Individuals regularly encounter disagreements involving differing goals, values, opinions, or expectations, conflict management can influence the outcome of these interactions. For example, collaboration may be used to develop mutually beneficial solutions, while compromise can help parties reach agreements when resources or time are limited. Avoidance, accommodation, and competition may also be appropriate in specific situations depending on the importance of the issue, the relationship between the parties, and the desired outcome. Effective use of conflict management styles are associated with improved communication, stronger relationships, enhanced problem-solving, and reduced interpersonal tension, making conflict management an important skill in daily life.

== See also ==
- Conflict avoidance
