= Nancy Stoyer =

American chemist

Nancy J. Stoyer
- Born: Empire, California
- Education: California State University, Stanislaus (BS); University of California, Berkeley (PhD)
- Occupation: Nuclear chemist
- Known for: Discovery of elements 113-118

Nancy J. Stoyer is an American nuclear chemist. She was part of the scientific team that discovered the 113 through 118 elements.

== Early life and education ==
Stoyer was born in Empire, California. She graduated from California State University, Stanislaus in 1988 with a B.S. in chemistry. She obtained her PhD in nuclear chemistry from UC Berkeley in 1995. As a graduate student, Stoyer studied both heavy elements and the actinide series.

== Career ==
Following her PhD, Stoyer worked at Lawrence Livermore National Laboratory until 2008, where she was involved in the discoveries of superheavy elements 113-118. After leaving Livermore in 2008, Stoyer pursued elementary teaching and "shar[ing] her passion for science with students".

She is on the board of the Pedrozzi Scholarship Foundation.

=== Scientific discoveries ===
Stoyer was part of the team of scientists at Lawrence Livermore National Laboratory that discovered and verified the existence of superheavy elements 113 (Nihonium), 115 (Moscovium) 116 (Livermorium), and 118 (Oganesson). She joined the American team in 1995. When element 114 (Flerovium) was synthesised in 1998 at Flerov Laboratory of Nuclear Reactions of the Joint Institute for Nuclear Research in Dubna, Russia, scientists at Livermore helped to confirm their discovery by assisting with independent analysis of their data. Stoyer generated a search code to search through the experimental data for decay sequences similar to the 114-289 decay sequence that had already been observed experimentally. This analysis was used to confirm that Flerovium had actually been made and detected.
