= Britt Rios-Ellis =

American academic administrator

Britt Rios-Ellis is an American academic administrator who is the thirteenth president of California State University, Stanislaus.

== Life ==
Rios-Ellis completed bachelor's degrees in Spanish and political science, a M.S. in health and fitness management, a certificate in women's studies, and a Ph.D. in community health from the University of Oregon.

Rios-Ellis was a professor of health sciences at California State University, Long Beach from 1994 to 2014. From 2014 to 2020, she was the founding dean of health sciences and human services at California State University, Monterey Bay. She is the provost and executive vice president of academic affairs at Oakland University. On July 1, 2024, she is selected to succeeded interim president Susan E. Borrego as the thirteenth president of California State University, Stanislaus.
