= Centre for Effective Dispute Resolution =

UK nonprofit organisation based in London

Centre for Effective Dispute Resolution (CEDR) is a London-based mediation and alternative dispute resolution body. It was founded as a non-profit organisation in 1990, with the support of The Confederation of British Industry (CBI) and a number of British businesses and law firms, to encourage the development and use of Alternative Dispute Resolution (ADR) and mediation in commercial disputes. CEDR also provides independent alternative dispute resolution for consumers who have problems with traders. Professor Karl Mackie, a barrister and psychologist, became the organisation's Chief Executive and Eileen Carroll QC (hon), a Trans-Atlantic partner with a law firm (who had been involved in the initiative to form CEDR) joined to become the Deputy Chief Executive in 1996. On 12 June 2010 it was announced in the Queen's Birthday Honours that Karl Mackie was appointed a CBE (Commander of the Order of the British Empire) by the UK Government for 'services to mediation', the first citing of this reason for the award.

== Background ==
Initially CEDR's focus was, by necessity, UK-focused, where in the early 1990s mediation was not well established in business disputes. Through its campaigning and training work CEDR helped influence the civil justice system. In 1996 the then Lord Chief Justice of England and Wales, Lord Harry Woolf (who now retired is Chair of CEDR's International Advisory Council), published his 'Access To Civil Justice Report' which encouraged the use of ADR, followed by the Civil Procedure Rules in 1999 which enabled judges to impose cost sanctions to either party when ADR was refused or ignored. These guidelines, along with case law (for example Dunnet v Railtrack, 2002) and subsequent clarification of the Civil Procedure Rules (CPR) saw the growth of the use of ADR and in particular mediation in the UK. Parallel to this was a growth in demand for CEDR's services in dispute resolution and training. From the mid-1990s onwards CEDR's focus became international, to begin with encouraging mediation in other European countries and working on international cases, to establishing the MEDAL international mediation service provider alliance (2005) and creating the first international mediation centre in China with China Council for the Promotion of International Trade (CCPIT).

== Areas of activity ==
CEDR works in four main ways.

=== Promotion ===
CEDR states that all money raised from its activities get put into the promotion of mediation and ADR, through events, schemes and running many services at cost. CEDR, a UK registered charity (no.1060369), asks global businesses to be members to support these activities. CEDR runs a number of elements under this umbrella, which include: The Exchange Participant Network Programme – quarterly events and newsletter for mediators around the world (over 700 members). The European Mediation Congress – a biennial conference event always held in London, last held in 2007. In 2009 this was instead a Conference on Settlement in International Arbitration. The Excellence in ADR Awards – another biennial event - a 20th Anniversary Awards will be held in 2010. The Mediator Audit – again biennial, previously to coincided with the Congress and gauges the quantity and quality of mediations in the UK over the previous two years. The last audit was published May 2010. The International Mediation Institute - as a board member of IMI since 2014, CEDR participates in setting quality standards and promoting the adoption of quality mediation around the world.

=== Dispute resolution ===
CEDR is the dispute resolution service arm of CEDR. Any business or law firm facing a dispute can call to speak to a case adviser who will provide advice and be able to recommend an accredited mediator to resolve their dispute. CEDR Solve says it has over 130 accredited mediators on its panel of experts and with 50 mediators directly (including Lord Woolf). The service says it has advised on over 16,000 disputes to date and mediates approximately 600 major cases a year.

On November 9, 2011 it was announced that, the previous day, CEDR had acquired IDRS Ltd, the dispute resolution service of the Chartered Institute of Arbitrators.

In 2007 CEDR started the Commission on International Arbitration, chaired by Lord Woolf and Professor Kaufmann-Kohler, to investigate settlement in international arbitration and to make recommendations on how arbitral institutions and tribunals can give parties greater assistance. The Commission is composed of 75 figures from the field and is also consulting 45 organisations from different jurisdictions. In 2009 the Commission published its Rules & Recommendations for Settlement in International Arbitration.

CEDR also provides independent alternative dispute resolution for consumers who have problems with traders.

=== Training ===
Training mediators for over seventeen years, its Mediator Training Skills are widely thought to be the best in the world. With a faculty of 30 experienced mediators, CEDR says over 5,000 mediators from different countries had been trained by 2009. Once passed, mediators can go on to become accredited. CEDR later branched out to offer other courses, such as a Certificate in Advanced Negotiation, Advocacy Skills for lawyers and Conflict Management for managers.

=== Consultancy and named clients ===
Increasingly CEDR says it is called into organizations and disputes at an early stage to design a resolution system or training scheme. In 2006 CEDR announced it had been appointed by the World Bank's International Finance Corporation to introduce mediation to Pakistan. In its 2005 report CEDR said it has also worked with IBM, the Court of Appeal and the National Association of Pension Funds.

Whilst no organizations were mentioned in its 2006 annual report, in 2007 CEDR said it ran projects or consulted with the IFC and World Bank, the European Patent Office, the London Olympics 2012, the Federal Government of India, PricewaterhouseCoopers, Germanischer Lloyd Wind Energy, the Chartered Institute for Personnel and Development, the Chartered Institute of Public Relations, the Ministry of Justice (UK), the National Health Service (UK), the Foreign & Commonwealth Office (UK) and UNCITRAL. The report shows that in addition to its work in the UK, in 2007 CEDR also worked in South Africa, China, the Ukraine, India, Pakistan, Kazakhstan, Turkey, Vietnam, the United States, Bosnia and Croatia.

The 2008 report names law firms it worked with as Allen & Overy, Ashurst, Clifford Chance, Eversheds, Herbert Smith, Lewis Silkin, Lovells, Mayer Brown, Nabarro and Norton Rose. The businesses and organizations given are Allianz, Association for Consultancy and Engineering (ACE), Barclays, Beazley, British Waterways, Court of Appeal, Deloitte, Department for Transport (UK), Home Office (UK), Hong Kong Bar Association, Howden, International Finance Corporation, International Underwriting Association, John Laing, Lloyd's Markets Association, Medical Protection Society, PricewaterhouseCoopers, QBE, Skanska, Teceris, Thames Water, UK Intellectual Property Office, University of Southampton and the World Bank.

In its 2009 annual report it says it worked with a number of banks - Barclays, Lloyds TSB, HBOS, National Westminster Bank/Royal Bank of Scotland, Credit Suisse, Goldman Sachs, UBS, Merrill Lynch and EBRD. Other organizations included are Beazley, Home Office (UK), John Laing, BBC, Sony, Panasonic, EDF Energy, Metropolitan Police, the Arts Council, Samsung, The Tribunals Service, ACAS, BDO Stoy Hayward, British Sugar, NHS Primary Healthcare Trusts, Roche, Bristol Myers Squibb, University of Cardiff, University of Birmingham, City University, Wolverhampton University, the Medical Protection Society, Lloyds Market Association, IFC and PricewaterhouseCoopers.
