= Conflict style inventory =

Conflict analysis method

A conflict style inventory is a written tool for gaining insight into how people respond to conflict. Typically, a user answers a set of questions about their responses to conflict and is scored accordingly.

Most people develop a patterned response to conflict based on their life history and history with others. This response may fit some situations well, but may be ineffective or destructive in other circumstances. The goal is to increase people's awareness of their own patterns and bring more options and flexibility within reach.

The most widely used conflict style inventories are based on the Mouton Blake Axis which posits five styles of conflict response (see managerial grid model). These include the Jay Hall Conflict Management Survey, the Thomas Kilmann Conflict Mode Instrument, a standard since the 1960s, the Canadian International Institute of Applied Negotiation's Conflict Style Root Assessment, and the Kraybill Conflict Style Inventory, a more recent publication that is culturally sensitive.

More extensive personality type instruments are also useful to help understand conflict style differences. The Myers–Briggs Type Indicator, which is based on the work of Carl Jung, and the Gilmore Fraleigh instruments fall in this category, but because the MBTI is widely dismissed as pseudoscience, any such insights may be unreliable.

Conflict resolution teachers and trainers, mediators, organizational consultants, and human resource managers use conflict style inventories in their work to help people reflect on and improve their responses to conflict. Awareness of styles helps people recognize that they have choices in how to respond to conflict. Since each style has a preferred way of interacting with others in conflict, style awareness also can greatly assist people in meeting the needs of those they live and work with.
