= Role conflict =

Concept in sociology

Role conflict occurs when there are incompatible demands placed upon a person relating to their job or position. People experience role conflict when they find themselves pulled in various directions as they try to respond to the many statuses they hold. Role conflict can be something that can be for either a short period of time, or a long period of time, and it can also be connected to situational experiences.

Intra-role conflict occurs when the demands are within a single domain of life, such as on the job. An example would be when two superiors ask an employee to do a task, and both cannot be accomplished at the same time. Inter-role conflict occurs across domains of life. An example of inter-role conflict would be a husband and father who is also Chief of Police. If a tornado strikes the small town he is living in, the man has to decide if he should go home and be with his family and fulfill the role of being a good husband and father or remain and fulfill the duties of a "good" Chief of Police because the whole town needs his expertise."

Conflict among the roles begins because of the human desire to reach success, and because of the pressure put on an individual by two imposing and incompatible demands competing against each other. The effects of role conflict, as found through case-studies and nationwide surveys, are related to individual personality characteristics and interpersonal relations. Individual personality characteristic conflicts can arise within personality role conflict where "aspects of an individual's personality are in conflict with other aspects of that same individual's personality". Interpersonal relations can cause conflict because they are by definition "having an association between two or more people that may range from fleeting to enduring, which can cause that conflict."

Example: "People in modern, high-income countries juggle many responsibilities demanded by their various statuses and roles. As most mothers can testify both parenting and working outside the home are physically and emotionally draining. Sociologists thus recognize role conflict as conflict among the roles corresponding to two or more statuses".

The discipline of group dynamics in psychology recognizes role conflict within a group setting. Members of a group may feel that they are responsible for more than one role within this setting and that these roles may become disagreeable with each other. When the expectations of two or more roles are incompatible, role conflict exists. For example, a supervisor at a factory may feel strain due to their role as friend and mentor to the subordinate employees, while having to exhibit a stern and professional watchful eye over the staff.

== Work–family conflict ==
A commonly noted role conflict is that between work and family. Researchers have noticed a declining fertility rate in developed countries. Some studies suggest that this drop may be because more women are pursuing careers and obtaining educations. The research is trying to show that women who have more trouble balancing their work life and family duties go on to have fewer additional children. While some people believe that work–family role conflict only occurs for women, a 2008 study by the Families and Work Institute showed that 49% of employed males with families experienced work–family conflict. The study also showed that work flexibility is the number one concern for employed females with families and the number two or three issue for employed men with families. Flexibility in the workplace can be a huge relief to a person struggling to balance their career and home-life. Having that control is something that could change the relationship between work and family life to better be able to manage role conflict, and if more business participated in this action there could be a possible better outcome for all. Another study was done in France where the same common conflict of work and family life roles were interfering to an extreme. This study found that not even working from home was the solution, but to be able to come in late or leave early, on a flexible schedule is what was working best to be able to handle the role conflict. Having this sort of flex schedule enables people to be able to work with their role conflicts and try to better be able to manage and cope with them. Again this study supports that if businesses do create this sort of flex schedule that this could be a definite possible solution.

Role conflict requirements for different roles might compete for a person's limited time, or could occur due to various strains associated with multiple roles. Some people can play one role and play it well while others can play multiple roles and also play them well. For example, the dominant social perspective is to see a father as the provider and the protector and the mother as the housewife, cooking and cleaning. If men who accept this view enter a kitchen and proceed to cook, they might feel inappropriate for that role and the same might apply to women who enter a garage and proceed to fix the car. This attitude is a root cause for the conflict many women feel when they become full-time workers and mothers. Women's rights have evolved greatly in the past forty years and women share most of the same rights as men. While women have stepped up to fill different roles, some feel that men have not stepped in to help balance out the work load. Mothers and fathers in the 2020s are expected by employers to be able have the career capacity of their non-parent counterparts. In addition to this, social pressure exists for modern-day mothers to fulfil the ideal of the mother/wife of the 1950s. Realistically, women have a hard time balancing the two. Many women feel that they are forced to choose between career and family, then are made to feel guilty about their choice by society.

== Social factors among low-income adults ==
When one has multiple role responsibilities, duties or demands from education, job or family relationships, it can be hard to manage. Additionally, the responsibilities are manageable while other times it can be hard to manage especially when one is living in a low income household.

== Homeless men and gender ==
Homelessness is a situation that takes a heavy toll on anyone, especially men with children or dependents. Traditional gender roles describe men as being the providers. Homeless men are often unemployed thus lack the means to provide the resources that their family needs. This can cause high levels of distress in men. Homeless men may also become the sole caregiver of their children during homelessness. This can lead to high stress levels in men because they are expected to take on the role of both provider and nurturer. The transition can be very overwhelming.

== In prisons ==
Role conflict is seen not only in the inmates of the prison, but also the prison personnel. There are two types of prisons: custody prisons and treatment prisons. The main goal of a custody prison is to protect the community by maintaining control over the inmates. The correctional officers are expected to maintain order, enforce rules, and keep custody. A key rule to their job is that interaction between inmates and officers is to remain distant. The main goal of a treatment prison is to protect the community by rehabilitating the inmate. The Officers are expected to respond to inmates in a therapeutic manner and develop ties with the inmates. Currently prisons are combining the two types of custody and the staff is experiencing role conflict. Officers are being asked to do conflicting jobs such as remain socially distant while also building close, supportive relationships with inmates. This emphasis on the combination of custody and treatment often results in two distinguished, mutually antagonistic groups of staff.

Prisons are filled predominantly with male inmates. This may be due to higher levels of testosterone. Domination is symbolized by control, independence, heterosexuality, aggressiveness, authority, and a capacity for violence in American culture. When a male finds themselves lacking in one of these areas they may be driven to make up for it in another area; such as when a poor, jobless young man tries to show masculinity by carrying a gun or wearing gang related clothing. When one is in prison, many of the resources use to assert masculinity are not readily available, thus men seek other ways to proclaim their masculinity. Many inmates find in imperative to put on a mask of hyper-masculinity, which may conflict with their normal personality, in order to maintain their status within the prison. This expectation to maintain a certain idea of masculinity "contradict[s] basic human needs and desires for intimacy and emotional expression, creating stress and conflict between men's core selves and social expectations."

== Role clarity and role ambiguity ==
One of the main causes of role conflict is role ambiguity, which is the lack of certainty in what a certain role in an organization requires. This can be the result or poor communication of job duties or unclear instructions from a supervisor. This can lead to role conflict when there are contradicting ideas as to what tasks are supposed to be accomplished. Team members can then be uncertain of their role and their teammate's roles to the team and team objectives begin to conflict with one another. Within families, an example of role ambiguity is whether a stepchild has the same social or moral obligations to care for a stepparent as a biological child would.

The solution to this problem and role conflict as a whole can come from role clarity. As its name suggests, role clarity is clearly defining roles and objectives so as to reduce role conflict and role ambiguity. To do this, employers need to clearly communicate the goals of a project to the employees. Also, employees should be fully aware of their role in the group and their responsibilities. It is helpful if one develops and maintains a working environment where workers have communication and if needed, feedback can be provided. Encouragement is another form of clarity. If one has a question or is not clear about a specific role that has been given to them, workers can communicate. Make sure the person understands their roles and duties to avoid any mistakes that can occur, and ensure that workers have an up-to-date role so they can manage their roles accordingly.

== Within a workplace ==
Working with groups – especially in a work or committee setting – can sometimes result in role conflict if an individual feels that their roles are in opposition. These roles may be in conflict for many reasons. For example, the role taker may misunderstand the role sender's prescribed tasks or the miscommunication can occur the other way, as well. If a role taker is seemingly enthusiastic about taking on many tasks within various roles, this may be communicated to the role sender and he or she may be given conflicting role requirements.

Role conflict can pair with role ambiguity – a situation in which the expectations of a role are ill-defined – to create role stress, which is detrimental to workplace performance. Role stress has also been linked to decreased job satisfaction and employee turnover.

To avoid role conflict within a work place, managers should outline specifically the duties required by an employee to avoid any miscommunication or confusion. Feedback should also be provided to employees, as this explicitly illustrates if the role-taker is properly performing the role requirements and can assist the role-taker if there are any concerns. Steps should be taken to avoid the crossover of potentially conflicting roles and if two or more roles are required of an employee, these roles should be separated by time and place if possible.

== Work performance ==
Role conflict can have many different effects on the work-life of an individual as well as their family-life. In a study in Taiwan, it was found that those suffering from role conflict also suffered greatly in their work performance, mainly in the form of lack of motivation. Those with role conflict did not do more than the bare minimum requirements at work. There was also a decline in the ability to assign tasks. Having multiple roles will often lead to job dissatisfaction.

Experiencing role conflict within the work place may also lead to workplace bullying. When companies undergo organizational change workers often experience either a loss or a gain in areas of a workers job, thus changing the expectations of the worker. Change is often very stressful for workers. Workers who might have lost a degree of power may feel like they lost their authority and begin to lash out at other employees by being verbally abusive, purposefully withholding work related items, or sometimes even physically to withhold their status.

== Inter-role ==
Interpersonal role conflict occurs when the source of the dilemma stems from occupancy of more than one focal position. For example, as a husband and a father in a social system a superintendent may think his wife and children expect him to spend most of his evenings with them. However, his school board and P.T.A. groups, he may feel, expect him (as their school superintendent) to spend most of his after-office hours on educational and civic activities. The superintendent usually cannot satisfy both of these incompatible expectations.

== Intra-role ==
Intra-personal role conflict occurs when an individual in one role believes that others have many different expectations for him/her in regards to that role. "The school superintendent, for example, may feel that the teachers expect him to be their spokesperson and leader, to take their side on such matters as salary increases and institutional policy. However, the superintendent may feel that the school board members expect him to represent them, to "sell" their views to the staff because he is the executive officer and the administrator of school board policies". And an example of mother as well in intra role conflict.

== Coping ==
"Inter-role conflict results from competing sets of expectations that are aroused by organizational, interpersonal, and personal conflicts" The following strategies assist in modifying and managing these areas.

One response to role conflict is deciding that something has to go. More than one politician, for example, has decided not to run for office because of the conflicting demands of a hectic campaign schedule and family life. In other cases, people put off having children in order to stay on the fast track for career success. Even the roles linked to a single status can make competing demands on us. A plant supervisor may enjoy being friendly with workers. At the same time, distance is necessary to evaluate his staff.

An individual can alter external, structurally imposed expectations held by others, regarding the appropriate behavior of a person in their position. The most effective alteration is change in the workplace. If the job is a "family-friendly" environment, the needs of a parent may be met easier. One of the biggest stress-relievers for working parents is paid time off including family sick days. Parents may feel trapped if they need to stay home with their child but knows that missing a day of work will, in return, dock them a day of pay. If they have a few days of paid leave they will be able to take care of their child and not have to worry about losing money for doing so. Another workplace support of work-family conflict is child care. Some jobs have a daycare facility on site or nearby, assisting parents in knowing their children are well taken care of while they are working. The latter example distributes role expectations to others in order to alleviate role conflict.

"Another approach involves changing one's attitude toward and perceptions of one's role expectations, as opposed to changing the expectations themselves. An example is setting priorities among and within roles, being sure that certain demands are always met (for example, the needs of sick children), while others have lower priority (such as dusting furniture)."

== See also ==
- Organizational conflict
- Organizational expedience
- Role engulfment
- Role set
- Role strain
- Workplace conflict
