= Party-directed mediation =

Form of conflict resolution

Party-directed mediation (PDM) is an approach to mediation that seeks to empower each party in a dispute, enabling each party to have more direct influence upon the resolution of a conflict, by offering both means and processes for enhancing the negotiation skills of contenders. The intended prospect of party-directed mediation is to improve upon the ability and willingness of disputants to deal with subsequent differences.

The concept behind party-directed mediation, depending upon the degree to which a case lends itself, is that if and when parties wish to spend the time to acquire the skills necessary to become more effective negotiators, then they can be empowered to achieve a self-directed resolution. The concept is most effective for disputants who wish to have a greater hand in resolving their own conflicts.

Party-directed mediation is of special value where individuals or stakeholders will continue to have ongoing interactions, as well as for conflicts with significant interpersonal aspects. As people become more talented negotiators, through adoption of enhanced negotiation skills, they tend to deal more effectively with conflict.

== Essential elements ==
Two of the most salient elements of party directed mediation generally are:

- A pre-caucus or pre-mediation meeting between the mediator and each of the parties prior to the joint session, and
- A 'joint session', where parties face each other and speak directly to each other, rather than through the mediator

In some instances, the pre-caucus may be so effective that parties go on to solve their conflict without a mediator. In fact, most people are able to resolve most of their conflicts without a mediator. There are times, however, when mediators are very much needed.

=== Pre-caucus ===
In the pre-caucus, the mediator meets with each party separately, away from other parties, before they are ever brought together into a joint session. The purpose of the pre-caucus is to help each party release their pent up concerns enough to enable them to gain a broader perspective, and to prepare the parties to pursue their own agenda in the ensuing joint session. This is done through a listening approach called Non-Directive Empathic Listening developed by Gregorio Billikopf and then helping participants through a self-evaluative process and sharing interpersonal negotiation skills with them.

=== Joint session ===
In the joint session, individuals are situated so they sit face to face in order to address each other directly, rather than through the mediator. To enhance this delegation of responsibility, clients sit facing directly across a table from each other, while the mediator sits at a distance from both. This assures that both parties must address each other, directly. Parties often must be reminded that the mediator is there to help the parties take responsibility for managing their own conflict, rather than to judge between the merits of the position of one party or the other.

== Concept origins ==
The party-directed mediation model was developed by Gregorio Billikopf of the University of California. One aspect of the mediation model focuses on listening, using the techniques of client centered therapy developed by Carl Rogers. The role of the mediator is primarily to be a good listener and coach, thereby allowing the parties involved to have free rein over the specific steps taken toward resolving a conflict or achieving a compromise.
