= Organizational expedience =

Organizational expedience is defined as workers’ behaviors that (1) are intended to fulfill organizationally prescribed or sanctioned objectives but that (2) knowingly involve breaking, bending, or stretching organizational rules, directives, or organizationally sanctioned norms.

There are several key aspects underlying the concept of organizational expedience. Firstly, organizational expedience describes a worker's actions but not their intentions. For example, if a shop assistant is considering giving a loyal customer a deeper discount than is permitted but decides not to do so after seeing her supervisor, then this shop assistant didn't engage in expedience.

Secondly, such definition requires workers to knowingly engage in expedience. If the rules are not known or well understood, or are accidentally broken, this behavior doesn't qualify as expedience. For example, if a long haul driver drove over the time limit because he doesn't know about the time limit rule, misunderstood the time limit rule, or forgot to look at the watch and accidentally broke the time limit rule, such behavior does not qualify as expedience.

== Work characteristics that may lead to organizational expedience ==
McLean Parks, Ma, and Gallagher (2010) proposed three role stressors as the theoretical antecedents of organizational expedience:

1. Role conflict. Role conflict is seen as an ‘incompatibility between expectations of a single role’
2. Role ambiguity. Role ambiguity is viewed as ‘uncertainty about what actions to take to fulfill the expectations of the role’
3. Role overload. Role overload refers to ‘the extent to which time and resources prove inadequate to meet expectations of commitments and obligations to fulfill a role’

== Mechanisms through which different role stressors lead to organizational expedience ==
1. One mechanism through which role overload leads to organizational expedience
  1. Emotional exhaustion: the feeling of ‘being emotionally overextended and drained’
2. Two mechanisms through which both role ambiguity and role conflict lead to organizational expedience
  1. Tension. Tension is defined as ‘a negative psychological experience based on job-related anxiety’
  2. Task conflict. Task conflict is defined as ‘an awareness of differences in viewpoints and opinions per¬taining to a group task’.

== Work context factors that may affect the strength of the linkage between role stressors and organizational expedience ==
1. Behavioral integrity of the manager. Behavioral integrity is defined as “managers’ consistency between words and deeds”. When the behavioral integrity of the manager is high, both role ambiguity and role conflict are less likely to lead to worker's organizational expedience

== Theoretical outcomes of expedience ==
1. Creativity. Creativity here is defined as ‘the generation of new and potentially valuable ideas concerning new products, services, manufacturing methods, and administrative processes’
2. Voice. Voice (also called individual initiative) here refers to the behavior of ‘actively and constructively trying to improve conditions through discussing

== Psychological factors of workers that may affect the strength of the linkage between organizational expedience and outcomes ==
1. Psychological ownership. Psychological ownership is the degree to which workers ‘feel possession of and psychologically tied to their organizations’. When worker's psychological ownership for the organization is high, organizational expedience is more likely to lead to creativity and voice.

== Related constructs ==
1. Counterproductive work behaviors. Counterproductive work behaviors refers to behaviors that are ‘volitional acts that harm or are intended to harm organizations or people in organizations’ Workplace deviance
2. Organizational retaliation behaviors. Organizational retaliation behavior refers to ‘adverse reactions to perceived unfairness by disgruntled employees toward their employer’
3. Propensity to withhold effort. Propensity to withhold effort refers to ‘the likelihood that an individual will give less than full effort on a job-related task’
