= Thomas–Kilmann Conflict Mode Instrument =

Test for a person's response to conflict

The Thomas–Kilmann Conflict Mode Instrument (TKI) is a conflict style inventory, which is a tool developed to measure an individual's response to conflict situations.

== Development ==
A number of conflict style inventories have been in active use since the 1960s. Most of them are based on the managerial grid developed by Robert R. Blake and Jane Mouton in their managerial grid model. The Blake and Mouton model uses two axes: "concern for people" is plotted using the vertical axis and "concern for task" along the horizontal axis. Each axis has a numerical scale of 1 to 9. These axes interact so as to diagram five different styles of management. This grid posits the interaction of task with relationship and shows that according to how people value these, there are five basic ways of interacting with others.

In 1974, Kenneth W. Thomas and Ralph H. Kilmann introduced their Thomas–Kilmann Conflict Mode Instrument (Tuxedo NY: Xicom, 1974).

== Description ==
The Thomas–Kilmann Conflict Mode instrument consists of thirty pairs of statements. For each pair, the respondent must choose either the A or B item (for example, one item depicts collaborating while the other item describes avoiding). Each pair of statements was specifically designed, through a multi-stage research process, to be equal in social desirability.

The TKI uses two axes (influenced by the Mouton and Blake axes) called "assertiveness" and "cooperativeness." The TKI identifies five different styles of conflict: Competing (assertive, uncooperative), Avoiding (unassertive, uncooperative), Accommodating (unassertive, cooperative), Collaborating (assertive, cooperative), and Compromising (intermediate assertiveness and cooperativeness).

In a 1978 published analysis of 86 responses, Thomas and Kilmann determined that the TKI exhibited moderate test-retest repeatability, moderate internal consistency (measured by Cronbach's alpha), and low to moderate correlation with three other instruments.

The TKI is held under copyright and is not publicly available or accessible to be conducted without being purchased for each individual assessment. Paper copies for purchase by the Myers Briggs Company (the current copyright holder) cost $21.95 USD per copy, and an on-line administered assessment with 90 days download access costs $45 USD.

The instrument is often used by students in conflict management classes or workshops. It has also been used in psychological studies—for example, to compare the conflict attitudes of college athletes and non-athletes.

One criticism of the instrument was that it was given so often in employment situations, as one newspaper columnist wrote in 1993, "I’ve taken the test so many times I know what answers will get the desired outcome." Others praise the TKI as a reliable, valid measure of personality.

== Modes ==
- Competing Style: The competing style involves high assertiveness and low cooperativeness, where individuals prioritize their own goals over others'. It is effective in urgent situations requiring quick decisions but can strain relationships and trust if overused. This approach aims for a "win-lose" outcome, asserting one's position strongly without accommodating others' perspectives. Examples include standing firm when confident in being right or when urgency demands immediate action without debate.
- Collaborating Style: The collaborating style is marked by high assertiveness and high cooperativeness. Individuals using this style seek solutions that benefit all parties involved, aiming for a "win-win" outcome. It is ideal when goals are aligned and working together closely can achieve optimal results. Examples include negotiating tasks that benefit multiple departments or resolving complex interpersonal conflicts to achieve mutual success.
- Compromising Style: In the compromising style, individuals show moderate assertiveness and cooperativeness, aiming to find middle ground that partially satisfies everyone's needs. This approach is suitable when both parties need to move forward and value reaching an agreement over individual preferences. It results in a balanced trade-off outcome. It balances assertiveness with cooperation, although it can sometimes appear indecisive. Examples include situations where mutual agreement is more important than individual victories or when progress requires both parties to compromise on their initial positions.
- Avoiding Style: The avoiding style features low assertiveness and low cooperativeness, as individuals seek to evade conflict rather than confront it. This approach is generally discouraged because it can lead to unresolved issues and strained relationships over time, aiming for a "no win - no lose" outcome. Examples include avoiding petty conflicts that distract from important tasks or postponing discussions when parties are unwilling to engage constructively.
- Accommodating Style: Lastly, the accommodating style is characterized by low assertiveness and high cooperativeness. Individuals using this style prioritize maintaining relationships and meeting others' needs over asserting their own interests. It is appropriate when preserving relationships is crucial or when the issue at hand is not significant enough to warrant a more assertive approach. Examples include yielding to others' preferences to maintain harmony or when the outcome of the conflict is less important than maintaining positive interpersonal dynamics.
