= Jane Mouton =

Jane Srygley Mouton (April 15, 1930 – December 7, 1987) was an American management theorist, remembered in particular for developing the Managerial grid model with Robert R. Blake.

== Biography ==
Mouton was born in Port Arthur, Texas in 1930. Her father, Theodore Quarles Srygley, was an educator and her mother, Grace Stumpe Srygley, was a psychologist. She married an investor, Jackson, C. Mouton, Jr. on December 22, 1953. The Moutons had two daughters named Jane Martha and Jacquelyn Cruse.

Jane Srygley Mouton received her Bachelor of Science in Mathematical Education from the University of Texas at Austin in 1950 and later returned to complete a PhD in 1957 (Contemporary, 2004). She also received a Masters of Science from Florida State University in 1951. She was loyal to the University of Texas at Austin with her working positions including being a research scientist from 1953 to 1957, a social science researcher and instructor from 1957 to 1959, and assistant professor of psychology from 1959 to 1964. She was furthermore vice-president of Scientific Methods Inc. from 1961 to 1981 and presided as president of the company after 1982.

Mouton was a former student of Robert Blake from the University of Texas. Together they are known for their creation of the aforementioned Managerial Grid which was admittedly composed of Mouton's creation and Blake's name (Bokeno, 2007).

The Grid came into existence when Blake and Mouton were hired as consultants by Exxon. It was during this time that their supposedly combined efforts produced the grid as a method of finding a median between McGregor's Theory X and Theory Y workers (Capstone, 2003). Originally, their work was reflected upon the National Training Laboratories (NTL) who they had worked with as a means of bringing their ideas into the organizations (Kleiner, 1996).

Mouton was among the few women to lead one of the NTL's T-Groups (Training Groups) during the 1950s. However, Blake and Mouton's methodology was more focused on treating the organizational issues rather than simply diagnosing them. This was contrary to standard NTL practices. Thus, they separated from the company. Blake had copyrighted the Grid so that only by franchising with him could someone else use the Grid for training, thus ensuring that everyone would use it in the way Blake and Mouton deemed fitting. Therefore, through their work with NTL leading T-Group's and the creation of Mouton's Managerial Grid, Blake and Mouton became famous, eventually co-founding Scientific Methods, Inc. in 1961 (Ultimate, 2003).

=== Honors ===
- Honorary member of the faculty at the Institute of Business Administration and Management in Tokyo, Japan
- Best Writing Award from the American Society for Training and Development (1961–1962)
- Book Award from the American College of Hospital Administrators for The New Managerial Grid (1980)
- Book of the Year Award from the American Journal of Nursing (1982) for Grid Approaches for Managerial Leadership in Nursing
- Book of the Year Award from the American Management Association (1982) for Productivity: The Human Side
