= Arbitration Act 1996 =

Act of the Parliament of the United Kingdom

Arbitration Act 1996 (Note: Section 110.)
- Act of Parliament
- Parliament of the United Kingdom
- Long title: An Act to restate and improve the law relating to arbitration pursuant to an arbitration agreement; to make other provision relating to arbitration and arbitration awards; and for connected purposes.
- Citation: 1996 c. 23
- Territorial extent: England and Wales; Scotland (in part); Northern Ireland (in part); (Note: Section 108.)

Dates
- Royal assent: 17 June 1996
- Commencement: 17 December 1996; 31 January 1997; (Note: The Arbitration Act 1996 (Commencement No. 1) Order 1996 (SI 1996/3146).)
Other legislation
Amends	Administration of Justice Act 1970; Limitation Act 1980; Military Lands Act 1892; Patents Act 1949; Agricultural Marketing Act 1958; Transport Act 1962; Carriage of Goods by Road Act 1965; Solicitors Act 1974; Industry Act 1975; Administration of Justice Act 1977; Judicature (Northern Ireland) Act 1978; Senior Courts Act 1981; Civil Jurisdiction and Judgments Act 1982; Foreign Limitation Periods Act 1984; County Courts Act 1984; Courts and Legal Services Act 1990; Social Security Administration Act 1992; Social Security Administration (Northern Ireland) Act 1992; Agricultural Tenancies Act 1995; Private International Law (Miscellaneous Provisions) Act 1995; Employment Tribunals Act 1996
Amended by	Housing Act 1996; Education Act 1996; Industrial Tribunals (Northern Ireland) Order 1996; Plant Varieties Act 1997; Social Security (Northern Ireland) Order 1998; Fair Employment and Treatment (Northern Ireland) Order 1998; Transfer of Functions (Lord Advocate and Secretary of State) Order 1999; Care Standards Act 2000; Communications Act 2003; Health and Personal Social Services (Quality, Improvement and Regulation) (Northern Ireland) Order 2003; Statute Law (Repeals) Act 2004; Constitutional Reform Act 2005; International Organisations Act 2005; Regulatory Reform (Agricultural Tenancies) (England and Wales) Order 2006; Transfer of Tribunal Functions (Lands Tribunal and Miscellaneous Amendments) Order 2009; Northern Ireland Act 1998 (Devolution of Policing and Justice Functions) Order 2010; Crime and Courts Act 2013; Public Bodies (Abolition of the Aircraft and Shipbuilding Industries Arbitration Tribunal) Order 2013; Co-operative and Community Benefit Societies Act 2014; Consumer Rights Act 2015; Courts and Tribunals (Judiciary and Functions of Staff) Act 2018; Arbitration Act 2025

Status: Amended

Text of statute as originally enacted

Revised text of statute as amended

Text of the Arbitration Act 1996 as in force today (including any amendments) within the United Kingdom, from legislation.gov.uk.

The Arbitration Act 1996 (c. 23) is an act of the Parliament of the United Kingdom which regulates arbitration proceedings within the jurisdiction of England and Wales and Northern Ireland.

The 1996 act only applies to parts of the United Kingdom. In Scotland, the Arbitration (Scotland) Act 2010 (asp 1) provides a statutory framework for domestic and international arbitration.

== Overview ==
England and Wales is one of the very few developed jurisdictions in the world which has consciously elected not to follow the UNCITRAL Model Law on International Commercial Arbitration. This is a position which has been subject to criticism.

== General duty of the tribunal ==
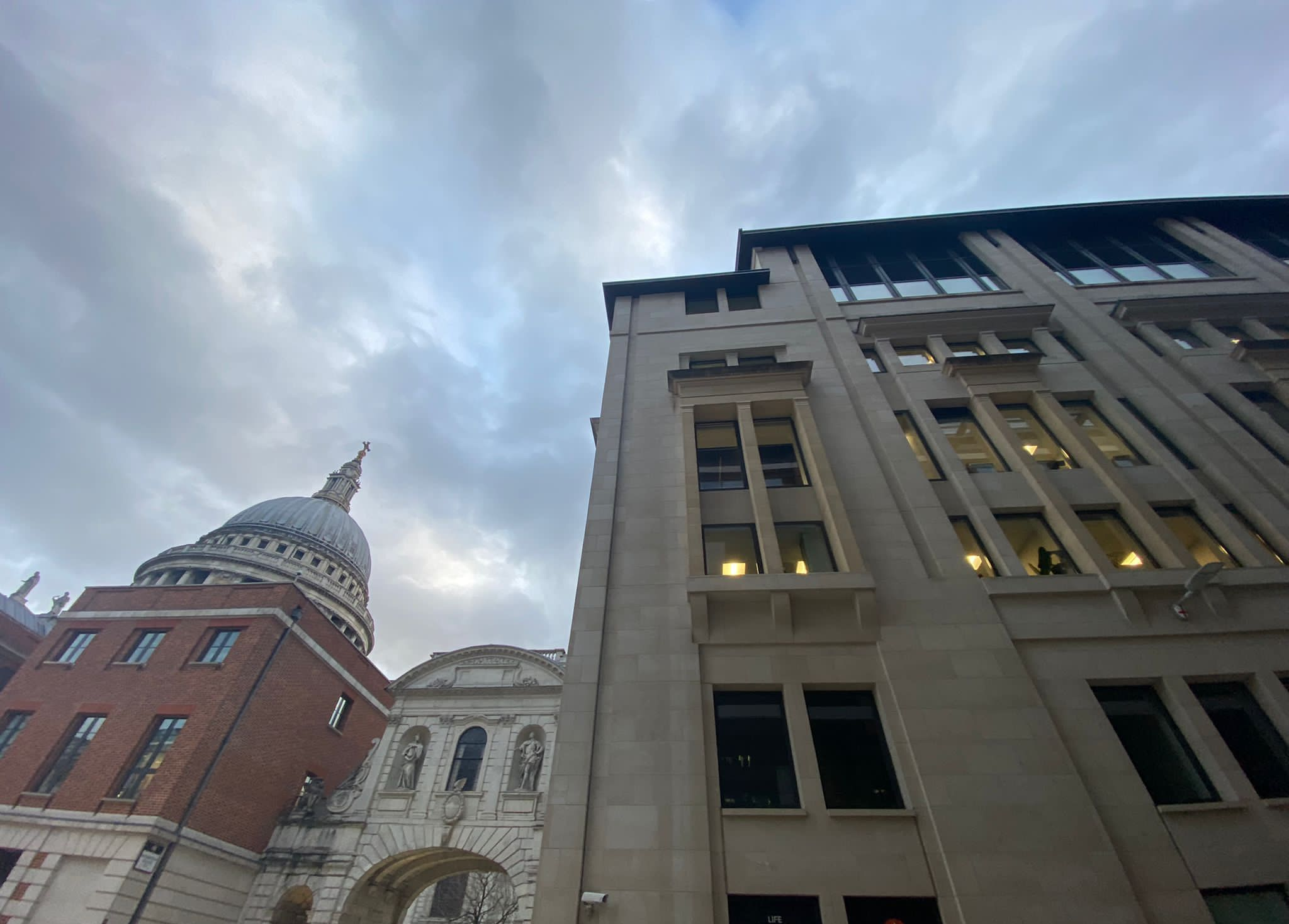
The London Court of International Arbitration.

The Act mandates that the general duty of the arbitral tribunal is to:

1. act fairly and impartially as between the parties, giving each party a reasonable opportunity of putting his case and dealing with that of his opponent, and
2. adopt procedures suitable to the circumstances of the particular case, avoiding unnecessary delay or expense, so as to provide a fair means for the resolution of the matters falling to be determined.

The various subsequent provisions relating to the conduct of arbitrations are largely pinned upon this overriding duty. The legislation specifies that "The tribunal shall comply with that general duty in conducting the arbitral proceedings, in its decisions on matters of procedure and evidence and in the exercise of all other powers conferred on it."

Subject to that overriding duty, the tribunal has broad discretion in relation to matters of procedure and evidence. The legislation provides that "It shall be for the tribunal to decide all procedural and evidential matters, subject to the right of the parties to agree any matter."

Procedural and evidential matters include:

1. when and where any part of the proceedings is to be held;
2. the language or languages to be used in the proceedings and whether translations of any relevant documents are to be supplied;
3. whether any and if so what form of written statements of claim and defence are to be used, when these should be supplied and the extent to which such statements can be later amended;
4. whether any and if so which documents or classes of documents should be disclosed between and produced by the parties and at what stage;
5. whether any and if so what questions should be put to and answered by the respective parties and when and in what form this should be done;
6. whether to apply strict rules of evidence (or any other rules) as to the admissibility, relevance or weight of any material (oral, written or other) sought to be tendered on any matters of fact or opinion, and the time, manner and form in which such material should be exchanged and presented;
7. whether and to what extent the tribunal should itself take the initiative in ascertaining the facts and the law; and
8. whether and to what extent there should be oral or written evidence or submissions.

The Act also imposes a duty on the parties to "do all things necessary for the proper and expeditious conduct of the arbitral proceedings."

== Stay of legal proceedings ==
If any legal proceedings are commenced against a party which are subject to an arbitration agreement, then the party may apply to the court for a stay of those legal proceedings, and the Act provides that the court "shall grant a stay unless [it is] satisfied that the arbitration agreement is null and void, inoperative, or incapable of being performed."

== Exclusion of the courts ==
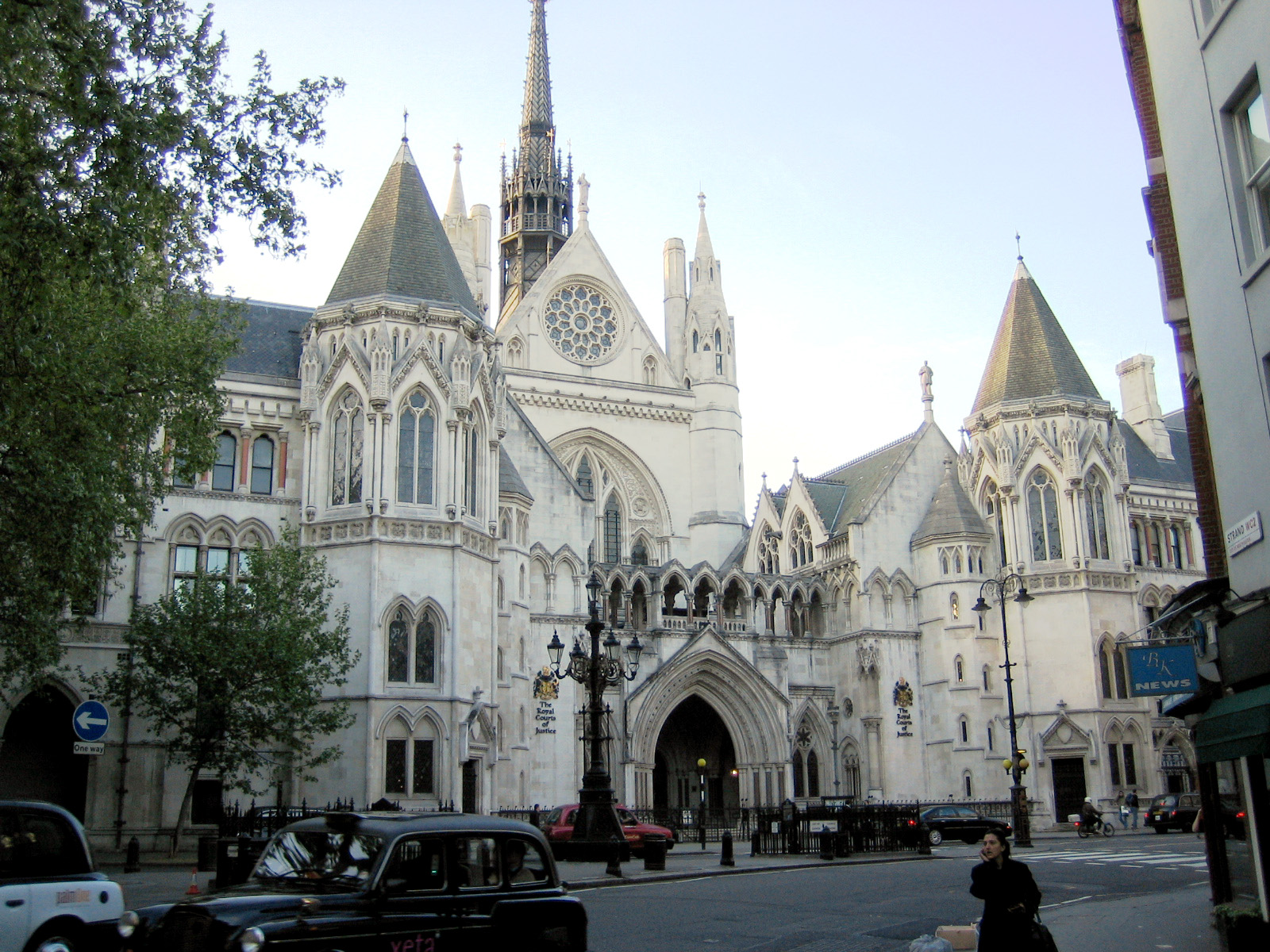
The Royal Courts of Justice.

Section 69 permits an appeal on a point of law to a court unless the parties have agreed to exclude that right. But the right to bring an appeal may only be exercised either with the agreement of the other party, or with the leave of the court, which would generally be given only where an arbitral decision is clearly incorrect, or the issue to be decided is of sufficient public importance and the decision made by the arbitral tribunal could reasonably be questioned. An agreement by the parties to dispense with the requirement to give reasons for the tribunal's award is treated as an agreement to exclude the court's jurisdiction to hear an appeal on a point of law.

== Challenging the award ==
Under the Act there are broadly only two ways in which an arbitration award may be challenged (apart from appeal on a point of law):

- Challenging the substantive jurisdiction under section 67; or
- Seeking to set aside the award for serious irregularity under section 68.

The Act defines serious irregularity as one or more of the following which the court considers has caused or will cause "substantial injustice" to the applicant:

1. failure by the tribunal to comply with section 33 (general duty of tribunal);
2. the tribunal exceeding its powers (otherwise than by exceeding its substantive jurisdiction);
3. failure by the tribunal to conduct the proceedings in accordance with the procedure agreed by the parties;
4. failure by the tribunal to deal with all the issues that were put to it;
5. any arbitral or other institution or person vested by the parties with powers in relation to the proceedings or the award exceeding its powers;
6. uncertainty or ambiguity as to the effect of the award;
7. the award being obtained by fraud or the award or the way in which it was procured being contrary to public policy;
8. failure to comply with the requirements as to the form of the award; or
9. any irregularity in the conduct of the proceedings or in the award which is admitted by the tribunal or by any arbitral or other institution or person vested by the parties with powers in relation to the proceedings or the award.

Any challenge to an award must be brought within 28 days of the arbitrator's decision, or notification of the outcome of any arbitral appeal or review. According to Lord Justice Popplewell, "this relatively short period of time reflects the principle of speedy finality which underpins the Act". Where "the interests of justice require an exceptional departure" from this timescale, an extension of time may be allowed. In 2012, Popplewell set out the factors which will influence a court's decision on whether to grant an extension of time as:

1. the length of the delay;
2. whether the party who permitted the time limit to expire and subsequently delayed was acting reasonably in the circumstances in doing so;
3. whether the respondent to the application or the arbitrator caused or contributed to the delay;
4. whether the respondent to the application would by reason of the delay suffer irremediable prejudice in addition to the mere loss of time if the application were permitted to proceed;
5. whether the arbitration has continued during the period of delay and, if so, what impact on the progress of the arbitration, or the costs incurred in respect of the arbitration, the determination of the application by the Court might now have;
6. the strength of the application;
7. whether in the broadest sense it would be unfair to the applicant for him to be denied the opportunity of having the application determined.

The first three points are "the primary factors".

== Fairness ==
Under section 91, a consumer arbitration agreement is unfair if the value of the claim to be resolved is less than £5000. A consumer agreement to arbitrate with a higher value claim may also be ruled unfair.

== Recognition of foreign awards ==
Recognition of foreign awards is addressed in Part III of the statute.

Section 99 provides that Part II of the Arbitration Act 1950, which deals with enforcement of non-New York Convention awards shall continue to apply to such awards.

The remainder of the part deals with the enforcement of awards from contracting states to the New York Convention. Those provisions broadly replicate the architecture of the Convention, and provide that such an award shall only be refused on the ground specified in the Convention, specifically:

1. that a party to the arbitration agreement was (under the law applicable to him) under some incapacity;
2. that the arbitration agreement was not valid under the law to which the parties subjected it or, failing any indication thereon, under the law of the country where the award was made;
3. that he was not given proper notice of the appointment of the arbitrator or of the arbitration proceedings or was otherwise unable to present his case;
4. that the award deals with a difference not contemplated by or not falling within the terms of the submission to arbitration or contains decisions on matters beyond the scope of the submission to arbitration (but see subsection (4));
5. that the composition of the arbitral tribunal or the arbitral procedure was not in accordance with the agreement of the parties or, failing such agreement, with the law of the country in which the arbitration took place;
6. that the award has not yet become binding on the parties, or has been set aside or suspended by a competent authority of the country in which, or under the law of which, it was made; or
7. if the award is in respect of a matter which is not capable of settlement by arbitration, or if it would be contrary to public policy to recognise or enforce the award.

== Amendments ==
In 2024, a bill to amend the act, sponsored by the Ministry of Justice, was introduced in the House of Lords. The amendments would give effect to a number of recommendations made in a Law Commission report concerned with arbitrators' impartiality and other matters.

Arbitration Act 2025 (Note: Section 18.)
- Act of Parliament
- Parliament of the United Kingdom
- Long title: An Act to amend the Arbitration Act 1996; and for connected purposes.
- Citation: 2025 c. 4
- Territorial extent: England and Wales; Northern Ireland; (Note: Section 16.)

Dates
- Royal assent: 24 February 2025
- Commencement: 24 February 2025 (sections 16 to 18) (Note: Section 17(1).); 1 August 2025 (rest of act) (Note: Section 17(2). The Arbitration Act 2025 (Commencement) Regulations 2025.)
Other legislation
Amends	Judicature (Northern Ireland) Act 1978; Senior Courts Act 1981; Arbitration Act 1996

Status: Current legislation

Text of statute as originally enacted

Revised text of statute as amended

Some of these amendments came into force in early 2025 when the Arbitration Act 2025 (c. 4) was passed. The primary aim of the 2025 act is to modernise and amend the 1996 act.

== See also ==
- UK commercial law
- UK labour law
- Advisory, Conciliation and Arbitration Service
- Alternative dispute resolution
- International arbitration
- International commercial law
- UNCITRAL Model Law on International Commercial Arbitration
- International Court of Arbitration
- Arbitration in the United States
- Industrial Conciliation and Arbitration Act 1894, a New Zealand labour law Act
- Conciliation and Arbitration Act 1904, an Australian labour law Act
