= United States Arbitration Association =

United States Arbitration Association (USADR) is an alternative dispute resolution organization headquartered in Denver, Colorado. USADR offers mediation to parties who have filed for arbitration through USADR's national forum.

== History ==
USADR was founded in 2005 in Colorado to offer arbitration and mediation services under the name Colorado Mediators & Arbitrators. The original Rules of Procedure were drafted by an attorney whose primary experience was as a NASD investigator. Its predecessor, Vision Mediation Group, LLC (2003–2005), limited ADR services to mediation.

In 2011, USADR expanded to provide ADR services nationally under the name United States Arbitration Association.

USADR primarily handles small to mid-size arbitration claims. Historically, arbitration administration for smaller dollar claims has been cost-prohibitive, making it particularly challenging for parties who seek resolution with claims of under $75,000.

The administrative costs in small and mid-size claims often exceed the amount of the claim itself.

== Mandatory arbitration relief ==
USADR provides the administrative infrastructure for small to mid-sized claims to be decided before a single arbitrator for a small standardized fee, with the delivery of a simple award. In part, this addresses the need to contain costs, as a panel of three arbitrators triples the cost of the arbitrator's hourly rate. The arbitrator is either appointed according to USADR rules, or selected in accordance with the parties' agreement. Under its rules, USADR may appoint an arbitrator in some circumstances, for example, in lower dollar claims where the parties have not specified a process for arbitrator selection.

== Rules and procedures in layman's terms ==
A primary objective of the USADR is to publish its rules and procedures in layman's terms. Arbitrator applicants who have industry knowledge and expertise are favored over arbitrator applicants whose experience is limited to the courts of law, and presiding arbitrators are consequently encouraged to apply common sense and equity when deciding a matter.

== Governing law ==
Clarification related to whether federal or state law takes precedence in a given arbitration matter is addressed in the USADR Rules of Procedure, for the benefit of the parties. USADR utilizes the following guidelines when parties submit their dispute for arbitration.

- Contract Silent on Governing Law: The arbitration will be conducted under Federal Arbitration Act (FAA) unless parties agree otherwise. Federal District Court has jurisdiction for arbitration conducted under FAA. The FAA is silent on the issue of punitive damages.
- Contract Names State Law: The arbitration will be conducted under the state law specified, unless parties agree otherwise. The state district court has jurisdiction for arbitration conducted under its arbitration act. Punitive damages vary according to state.
- Contract is Silent on Rules of Procedure: The arbitration will be conducted utilizing USADR's Rules of Procedure. Where USADR's rules conflict with governing law, the governing law will prevail.
- Stated Rules of Procedure: USADR may administer an arbitration action utilizing stated rules in the arbitration clause with the agreement of the parties. The parties shall indicate their agreement on the appropriate submission agreement according to the claim amount. USADR shall appoint the arbitrator for small claims or mid-size claims or follow the arbitrator selection process identified in Rule A-9; the appointed arbitrator shall then utilize the specified rules for all subsequent matters. Where the rules of procedure conflict with governing law, the governing law will prevail."

== Presentation of applicable law ==
The presentation of applicable law is the responsibility of the parties. An arbitrator's disregard of the law presented by the parties is cause for challenging an award in a court of competent jurisdiction.

== See also ==
- FINRA
- Alternative dispute resolution
- Arbitration award
- Arbitration in the United States of America
- Conflict resolution
- Mandatory arbitration
