= Arbitration Roundtable of Toronto =

The Arbitration Roundtable of Toronto is made up of several litigators, academics, arbitrators, and mediators from the Greater Toronto Area. The group promotes arbitration as an alternative method of conflict resolution over litigation, especially in commercial suits. Members include commercial litigators from Toronto law firms including some of the Seven Sisters of Bay Street. Each member has experience and interest in promoting commercial Arbitration. The group dedicates its time to encouraging this form of Dispute resolution through seminars, papers, and talks.

== History ==
Founded in summer 2004 when John Judge and William G. Horton talked about bringing several prominent ADR Chambers members together after noticing how well suited to arbitration Toronto representatives were during an ICC arbitration with counsel from Canada, France, Germany, and the United States.

== Arbitration ==
Arbitration focuses on resolving conflicts outside of courthouse litigation. Parties defer to one or more mutually acceptable arbitrators who will come to the final decision. This mode of resolution has often been related to Alternative dispute resolution. In Canada groups and persons interested in or promoting ADR work with the ADR Institute of Canada, Inc.

== Associations ==
Members of The Arbitration Roundtable of Toronto are associated with international groups promoting arbitration including ADR Chambers, The International Centre for Dispute Resolution, The British Columbia International Commercial Arbitration Center, The London Court of International Arbitration, The Institute for Transnational Arbitration, the CPR International Institute for Conflict Prevention and Resolution, The Centre for Effective Dispute Resolution, and the Ministry of the Attorney General's Toronto Local Mediation Committee.

== Members ==
Members of the Roundtable belong to several major law firms, educational institutions, and private practices located in the Toronto area as well as abroad.

Members	Primary Association
Brian Casey	Baker McKenzie
William G. Horton	Independent Counsel
John Judge	Stikeman Elliott
Barry Leon	Perley-Robertson, Hill & McDougall
David McCutcheon	Fraser Milner Casgrain
Graeme Mew	Nicholl Paskell-Mede
Randy Pepper	ADR Chambers
Joel Richler	Blake, Cassels & Graydon
Donald E. Short	Fasken
Janet Walker	Osgoode Hall Law School
Robert Wisner	McMillan

=== Brian Casey ===
Brian Casey is the managing partner at Baker McKenzie. His areas of practice include International arbitration, Domestic Arbitration, Commercial Litigation, Intellectual Property, Competition Law, Banking and Finance Litigation, and Professional negligence. Associations include ADR Chambers, The Advocates' Society, the Canadian Bar Association, the Chartered Institute of Arbitrators, the International Bar Association, and the Law Society of Upper Canada.

Casey has a BS in engineering from Carleton University as well as a LL.B from the University of Ottawa and a LL.M from York University in International Business Law.

The Lexpert/American Lawyer Guide to the leading 500 lawyers in Canada lists Brian Casey under international commercial arbitration and commercial litigation.

=== William G. Horton ===
William G. Horton practices as independent counsel working with a variety of top law firms in Toronto His areas of practice include business and corporate disputes, class action, competition offences, defamation, directors and officers liability, fiduciary duty and good faith obligations, fraud, injunctive remedies, insurance and reinsurance disputes, international banking disputes, lender liability, litigation arising from major insolvencies and reorganizations, professional liability, and shareholder disputes.

Horton has a Bachelor of Laws from Osgoode Hall Law School, and a BA from Victoria University in the University of Toronto. Associations include ADR Chambers, the ADR Institute of Canada, the Advocates' Society, the American Bar Association, the British Columbia International Commercial Arbitration Centre, the Canadian Bar Association, the Chartered Institute of Arbitrators, the China International Economic Trade and Arbitration Commission, the International Chamber of Commerce, the ICDR, the International Bar Association, the International Law Association, the Law Society of Upper Canada, the NAFTA 2022 Committee, the Ontario Bar Association, Osgoode Hall Law School, and Vis Moot.

Best Lawyers in Canada 2009 recognized Horton for Alternative Dispute Resolution, Corporate & Commercial Litigation, Directors & Officer Liability, and International Arbitration. He is also listed in the 2008 Lexpert Directory, the 2008 Lexpert/American Lawyer Guide to the Leading 500 Lawyers in Canada, Lexpert 2007: Leading US/Canada Cross Border Litigation Lawyers in Canada, The International Who's Who of Business Lawyers 2007, Chambers Global: The World's Leading Lawyers for Business 2006 and 2007, The Canadian Legal Lexpert Directory 2006, Legal Media Group's The Best of the Best 2006, and PLC Which Lawyer? Yearbook 2006.

=== John Judge ===
John Judge is a senior partner at Stikeman Elliott practising both corporate and commercial law and specializing in banking and insolvency disputes, insolvency matters, insurance and reinsurance claims, partnership and shareholder disputes, product liability, professional negligence, real estate and complex construction litigation, sale of goods, and share/asset acquisitions as well as technological disputes and trademark law Aside from his corporate and commercial work, Judge has also served as counsel in several cases regarding human rights for the Ontario Human Rights Commission and has worked on many international arbitrations through the International Chamber of Commerce in Paris.

Judge earned his BA from the University of Toronto in 1972 and his LL.B from the same school in 1975 before gaining bar admission in 1977. He is a member and past director of the Advocates' Society, American Bar Association, Arbitration Committee of the Canadian Chamber of Commerce, Canadian Bar Association, Chartered Institute of Arbitrators (MCI Arb.), Computer Law Association, Information and Technology Law Association, Institute for Transnational Arbitration in Dallas, International Bar Association, London Court of International Arbitration, an instructor at the Osgoode Hall Intensive Trial Advocacy Program, and director of the Sopinka Cup Society.

=== Barry Leon ===
Barry Leon is a partner in the International Arbitration Group at Perley-Robertson, Hill & McDougall. He has more than 30 years of experience as counsel, acting on many complex and significant cases for a wide variety of clients and involving many different industries. His industry experience includes financial services, natural resources and energy, technology and intellectual property, manufacturing, construction and projects, and consumer products.

He has been recognized several times as one of the leading lawyers in Toronto, specifically in Woodward White's Best Lawyers in Canada 2006, Lexpert/Thomson Canada's Canadian Legal Lexpert Directory 2006, Legal Media Group's Guide to the World's Leading Litigation Lawyers 2005, and "The Experts: Update on Cross-Border Litigation" in Canadian Lawyer in May 2005. Leon received his LL.B from the University of Toronto and his M.B.A from the Richard Ivey School of Business at the University of Western Ontario.

In 2011, Leon was elected chair of the arbitration committee of the Canadian Chamber of Commerce, the Canadian branch of the International Chamber of Commerce. In 2012, Leon joined Arbitration Place, a hearing centre that hosts and facilitates international and domestic arbitrations.

=== David McCutcheon ===
David McCutcheon is a partner at Fraser Milner Casgrain in Toronto practising commercial ADR, corporate commercial litigation, administrative law, real estate and construction law, and environmental counsel.

He serves as a member of the National Partnership Board and the Ontario Office Management Board. In addition he is a Fellow and Past President of the ADR Institute of Canada Inc., Past President of the ADR Institute of Ontario, Past Vice-president of the ADR Institute of Canada and chair of the Rules Committee, an Arbitration Panel Member for the ADR Institute of Canada and ADR Institute of Ontario, Chartered Arbitrator on the roster of the ADR Institute of Canada Inc. and the BCICAC, and a Member of the ICC Arbitration Panel.

=== Graeme Mew ===
Graeme Mew is a managing partner at Nicholl Paskell-Mede in Toronto. His practice includes all levels of advocacy in England, Wales, and Ontario for business disputes, civil and commercial litigation, contract and tort law, insurance law, liability of directors and officers, private international law, professional liability, public law, and sports law. As a dual citizen of Britain and Canada he works as a Barrister in England and Wales and a barrister and solicitor in Ontario as well as a mediator and arbitrator.

Mew has his B.A. in law from Kingston University and was called to the Bar of England and Wales in 1982. He received his LL.B. from the University of Windsor in Ontario in 1986 and was on the Dean's Honour Roll. He was called to the Ontario Bar and admitted as a solicitor in Ontario in 1987 before being admitted pro hac vice by the District Court of the US Virgin Islands in 2003.

Graeme Mew's memberships include The Advocates' Society, the Arbitration and Mediation Institute of Ontario, the Australian and New Zealand Sports Law Association, the Canadian Bar Association, the Centre for Effective Dispute Resolution as a CEDR Accredited Mediator, the Chartered Institute of Arbitrators, the Commonwealth Lawyers Association, the Federation of Defense and Corporate Counsel (US), the Honourable Society of the Middle Temple, the International Academy of Sportslaw Practitioners and Executives, the International Bar Association, the Law Society of Upper Canada, the Medico-Legal Society of Toronto, the Metropolitan Toronto Lawyers' Association, and the Sports Lawyers Association (US). Graeme Mew is a subscriber of the American Arbitration Association and a Member Arbitrator at Arbitration Place, a hearing centre that hosts and facilitates international and domestic arbitrations.

=== Randy Pepper ===
Randy Pepper, formerly a partner at Osler, Osler, Hoskin & Harcourt in Toronto now works out of ADR Chambers. His practice focuses on corporate commercial litigation, specifically arbitration, competition and shareholder rights, defamation, internet liability, and product liability class actions. He works in both international and domestic arbitration decisions and served as Chair of Osler's International Commercial Arbitration/ADR Group.

Pepper was called to the Ontario Bar in 1983, became a solicitor in the Supreme Court of England and Wales in 1987, and the High Court of Hong Kong in 1987. He is a member of many associations including the ADR Institute of Ontario and ADR Institute of Canada, for both of which he serves on the board, as well as the arbitration committee of the Canadian Chamber of Commerce, the CPR Institute for Dispute Resolution, and the ADR Institute of Ontario. He received his L.L.M. in arbitration and mediation from LSE.

=== Joel Richler ===
Joel Richler is a partner at the Toronto office of Blake, Cassels & Graydon in Toronto. His practice includes having tried, arbitrated, and mediated cases in construction, contract disputes, procurement, product liability, securities, shareholders' rights, and technology and software.

The Canadian Legal Lexpert Directory has recognized Joel Richler for several years as a leading practitioner in corporate commercial litigation, construction law, securities litigation, directors' and officers' litigation and professional liability law. The Best Lawyers in Canada 2008 has cited him for his work in corporate and commercial litigation, directors and officers liability, legal malpractice law and construction law. Richler possesses an AV rating in Martindale-Hubbell and Chambers Global: The World's Leading Lawyers for Business have ranked him since 2005.

=== Donald E. Short ===
Donald Short is a partner at Fasken Martineau DuMoulin in Toronto and chairs the firm's Toronto Construction Law Group Certified by the Law Society as a Specialist in Civil Litigation, his practice focuses on commercial and construction litigation, insolvency matters, and alternative dispute resolution. Recognitions of his work in arbitration include being listed in the Euromoney Guide to the world's leading experts in arbitration, as well as listings from Lexpert and The Best Lawyers in Canada. In 1999 he received the Award for Distinguished Service and in 2001 the Award for Excellence in Alternative Dispute Resolution from the Canadian Bar Association Ontario.

Short has a B.A. in political science from the University of Toronto, his LL.B., also from the University of Toronto, his LL.M. from Osgoode Hall, and in 2003 earned his F.C.I.Arb. from The Chartered Institute of Arbitrators. He is a current member of the Civil Bench and Bar Committee, Toronto Region; the Commercial List Users' Committee, Ontario Superior Court of Justice; the Continuing Legal Education Committee, OBA; the National Council of Canadian Bar Association; the Provincial Council of Ontario Branch of the CBA; The Advocates' Society ADR Committee; the Toronto Local Mediation Committee (appointed by Attorney General); and the Toronto Region Case Management Steering Committee.

=== Janet Walker ===
Janet Walker is a full professor and former associate dean at Osgoode Hall Law School, York University. She currently serves as an advisor to the Federal Court and Federal Court of Appeal Rules Committee as well as on the Canadian Panel of Arbitrators, International Chamber of Commerce; the IBA Task Force on International Procedures and Protocols for Collective Redress; the Working Group on Protocols for Parallel Class Actions, Litigation Section of the ABA; and the ILA Committee on International Litigation and the Interests of the Public: International Aspects of Group Actions.

Walker works frequently as an expert witness for laws of jurisdiction, forum non conveniens, the recognition and enforcement of judgments and application of foreign law. She also serves as counsel to members of the profession in the public and private sectors in Canada, the United States and Australia.

Associations: Janet Walker is a member of include the American Arbitration Association, the American Law Institute, the American Society of International Law, the Arbitralwomen, the Arbitration Roundtable of Toronto, the Canadian Bar Association, the Canadian Association of Law Teachers, the Canadian Council on International Law, the Chartered Institute of Arbitrators, the International Association of Procedural Law, the International Bar Association, the International Chamber of Commerce, the International Law Association, the Law Society of Upper Canada, the London Court of International Arbitration, the Osgoode Society, The Advocates' Society, and the Young Canadian Arbitration Practitioners. In 2012, Janet Walker joined Arbitration Place, an internationally affiliated arbitration facility and legal centre.

In 2002 Walker was awarded the Queen's Golden Jubilee Medal for her continuing service in the Canadian Forces Primary Reserve. She has her B.A and M.A. from York University, her LL.B. from Osgoode Hall Law School, and her DPhil from Oxford University.

=== Robert Wisner ===
Robert Wisner is a partner in the Litigation and Dispute Resolution group of Toronto. His practice is centred on international arbitration and litigation, foreign investment protection and international trade. Called to the bar in 1996, he received his LL.B. from the University of Toronto in 1994, his M.A. from Queen's University in 1990, and his B.Soc.Sci. from the University of Ottawa in 1989.

His previous work includes cases before international arbitral tribunals, NAFTA and international commercial contracts, as well as advocacy work, foreign investment protection, market access, government procurement, economic sanctions, political risk insurance, anti-bribery and other international treaty issues. Previously, Wisner was an economist in Canada's Department of International Trade Investment Policy Division.
