= Arbitration Place =

International Arbitration Facility and Legal Centre

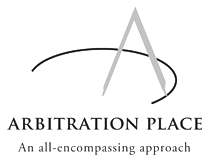
- Industry: Law
- Headquarters: Toronto
- Key people: Kimberley Stewart, CEO and Founder
- Products: Arbitration
- Website: http://arbitrationplace.com

Arbitration Place is an internationally affiliated arbitration facility and legal centre located in the Bay-Adelaide Centre, in Toronto, Canada.

== Profile ==
Arbitration Place hosts domestic and international arbitrations and facilitates these arbitrations through legal and administrative services such as on-site court reporting, videoconferencing, technical support, closed-captioning, interpreters, translators, and in-house legal counsel. Resident arbitrators include Yves Fortier, past President of the London Court of International Arbitration, and the Honourable Ian Binnie, former Justice of the Supreme Court of Canada. As Ian Binnie notes in an interview with Evan Solomon, the aim of Arbitration Place is to position Canada as a forum for international commercial arbitration.

== Partnerships ==
Arbitration Place maintains partnerships with the London Court of International Arbitration (LCIA) and with ICC Canada, the Canadian national committee of the International Court of Arbitration of the International Chamber of Commerce.

== Resident arbitrators ==
- Ian Binnie
- Robert P. Armstrong
- Stan Fisher
- Yves Fortier
- Thomas Heintzman
- Coulter Osborne

== Member arbitrators ==
- Louise Barrington
- Earl Cherniak
- Konrad von Finckenstein
- John Judge
- Barry Leon
- John Lorn McDougall
- Graeme Mew
- Joseph R. Nuss
- Harry Radomski
- Janet Walker
