= Non-binding arbitration =

Non-binding arbitration is a type of arbitration in which the arbitrator makes a determination of the rights of the parties to the dispute, but this determination is not binding upon them, and no enforceable arbitration award is issued. The "award" is in effect an advisory opinion of the arbitrator's view of the respective merits of the parties cases. Non-binding arbitration is used in connection with attempts to reach a negotiated settlement. The role of an arbitrator in non-binding arbitration is, on the surface, similar to that of a mediator in a mediation. However, the principal distinction is that whereas a mediator will try to help the parties find a middle ground to compromise at, the arbitrator remains totally removed from the settlement process and will only give a determination of liability and, if appropriate, an indication of the quantum of damages payable.

Subsequent to a non-binding arbitration, the parties remain free to pursue their claims either through the courts, or by way of a binding arbitration, although in practice a settlement is the most common outcome. The award and reasoning in a non-binding arbitration is almost invariably inadmissible in any subsequent action in the courts or in another arbitration tribunal.

Non-binding arbitration is utilised mostly in the United States and Canada. It is largely unknown in Europe, although in the United Kingdom there is a practice of parties who are seeking a settlement to jointly instruct a King's Counsel or Queen's Counsel for an opinion on the merits and likely quantum of a claim, and then to negotiate on the basis of the views expressed in that opinion.

== In fiction ==
- In the Michael Crichton book, Disclosure (and in the 1994 film of the book), the sexual harassment claim relating to the lead character, Tom Sanders, is subject of a non-binding arbitration, which finds in his favour, but the other parties reject the determination.
