= Arbitration Act 1996 (New Zealand) =

Act of Parliament in New Zealand

New Zealand Parliament
- Long title: An Act to reform the law relating to arbitration
- Enacted: 2 September 1996
- Commenced: 1 July 1997
- Status: Current legislation

The Arbitration Act 1996 is an act of parliament in New Zealand. It implemented recommendations of the Law Commission, including the adoption of the UNCITRAL Model Law on International Commercial Arbitration. It came into force on 1 July 1997, and replaced the Arbitration Act 1908.
