= QRG on Arbitration, Conciliation and Mediation =

Non-fiction law book

- Author: Vishnu S Warrier
- Language: English
- Subject: Law, arbitration
- Publisher: LexisNexis
- Publication date: January 1, 2015
- Publication place: India
- English publication date: January 1, 2015
- Media type: Print
- Pages: 150
- ISBN: 9789351433781

Quick Reference Guide on Arbitration, Conciliation & Mediation is a book authored by Vishnu S Warrier published by LexisNexis in 2015.

The book studies the concept of arbitration, mediation and conciliation procedure in ancient India and present. Considering law students in mind, author did justice to conceptualize the alternative dispute resolutions such as arbitration, mediation and conciliation into an easily understanding language.

== Key concepts ==
In pursuit of globalisation, India responded positively by opening up its economy. Along with the benefits promised, it also brought lots of issues. As we all know major concern of law is the conflict resolution. Traditional justice delivery system through the adjudication of courts, had already given way a large extent of alternative mode of dispute Resolution in common law countries. Following are the key concepts covered under this book.

Alternative dispute resolution in India is not new and it was in existence even under the previous Arbitration Act, 1940. The Arbitration and Conciliation Act, 1996 has been enacted to accommodate the harmonisation mandates of UNCITRAL Model. To streamline the Indian legal system the traditional civil law known as Code of Civil Procedure, (CPC) 1908 has also been amended and section 89 has been introduced. Section 89 (1) of CPC provides an option for the settlement of disputes outside the court. It provides that where it appears to the court that there exist elements, which may be acceptable to the parties, the court may formulate the terms of a possible settlement and refer the same for arbitration, conciliation, mediation or judicial settlement

=== Arbitration ===
The process of arbitration can start only if there exists a valid arbitration agreement between the parties prior to the emergence of the dispute. As per Section 7, such an agreement must be in writing. The contract regarding which the dispute exists, must either contain an arbitration clause or must refer to a separate document signed by the parties containing the arbitration agreement. The existence of an arbitration agreement can also be inferred by written correspondence such as letters, telex, or telegrams which provide a record of the agreement. An exchange of statement of claim and defense in which existence of an arbitration agreement is alleged by one party and not denied by other is also considered as valid written arbitration agreement.

=== Conciliation ===
Conciliation is a less formal form of arbitration. This process does not require an existence of any prior agreement. Any party can request the other party to appoint a conciliator. One conciliator is preferred but two or three are also allowed. In case of multiple conciliators, all must act jointly. If a party rejects an offer to conciliate, there can be no conciliation.

=== Mediation ===
The term "mediation" broadly refers to any instance in which a third party helps others reach agreement. More specifically, mediation has a structure, timetable and dynamics that "ordinary" negotiation lacks. The process is private and confidential, possibly enforced by law. Participation is typically voluntary. The mediator acts as a neutral third party and facilitates rather than directs the process.

=== Negotiation ===
Negotiation is a dialogue between two or more people or parties intended to reach a mutually beneficial outcome, resolve points of difference, to gain advantage for an individual or collective, or to craft outcomes to satisfy various interests.
