= Robert P. Armstrong =

Canadian lawyer and retired judge

The Honourable Robert P. Armstrong KC
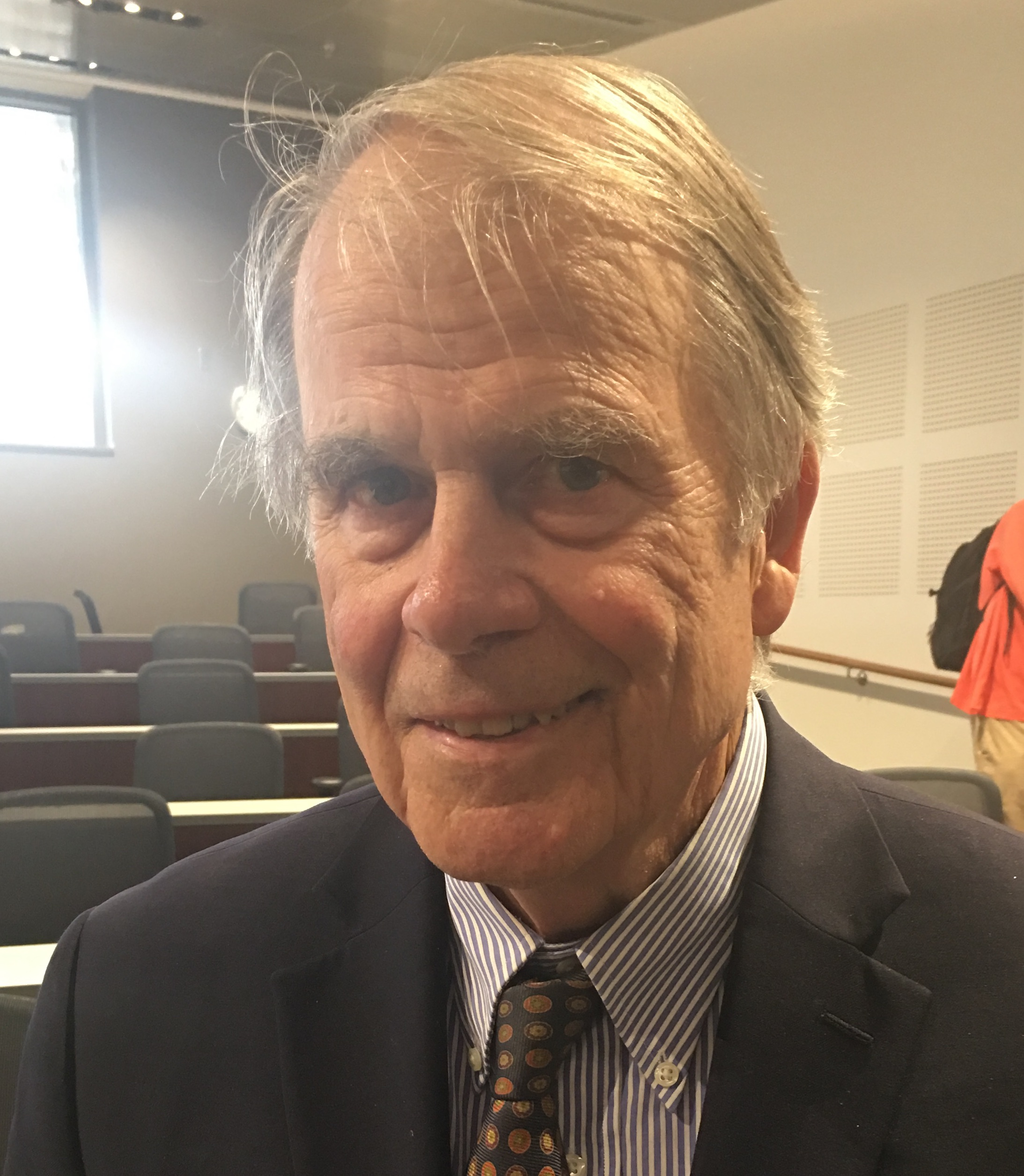
- Justice Armstrong in 2017

Justice of the Court of Appeal for Ontario
- In office January 2002 – March 2013

56th Treasurer of the Law Society of Upper Canada
- In office 1999–2001
- Preceded by: Harvey Thomas Strosberg
- Succeeded by: Vern Krishna

Personal details
- Born: Robert Patrick Armstrong; March 7, 1938 (age 88)
- Education: Carleton University (BA); University of Toronto (MA, LLB); Law Society of Upper Canada (LLD, honoris causa)

Robert Patrick Armstrong KC (born March 7, 1938) is a Canadian lawyer and retired judge. He served on the Court of Appeal for Ontario from 2002 until his retirement in 2013. Before serving on the bench, Armstrong was a partner at Torys and was lead counsel in the Dubin Inquiry on steroid use in Canadian sports. After leaving the bench, Armstrong joined Arbitration Place, a Canadian group specializing in alternative dispute resolution.

== Early life and career ==
Armstrong was born on March 7, 1938. He was a student at Carleton University, the University of Toronto, and the London School of Economics. He earned his LLB from the University of Toronto Faculty of Law in 1965 and was called to the bar two years later in 1967. Armstrong began practicing law with Kimber, Dubin in Toronto.

Armstrong joined Torys in Toronto in 1972, where he would stay until his 2002 appointment to the Ontario Court of Appeal. Armstrong became a partner at Torys in 1973, and was appointed a Queen's Counsel in 1978.

Armstrong was commission counsel in the 1981 Grange Commission on Railway Safety, which was formed to study the 1979 Mississauga train derailment. According to the Los Angeles Times, Armstrong's "tenacious grilling" of witnesses in the Grange Commission bolstered his reputation.

Armstrong served as lead counsel for the 1989 Dubin Inquiry, a federal inquiry launched after Ben Johnson's doping scandal at the 1988 Summer Olympics in Seoul. Armstrong worked with his mentor Justice Charles Dubin, the chair of the inquiry, to guide the testimony of witnesses such as Ben Johnson, Angella Taylor-Issajenko, Charlie Francis about the extent of their anabolic steroid use and how they avoided discovery. The inquiry recommended random, unannounced drug-testing of athletes to deter the use of anabolic steroids.

Armstrong has appeared in important cases including the 1995 case of Hill v. Church of Scientology of Toronto in the Supreme Court of Canada.

Armstrong was a bencher of the Law Society of Upper Canada from 1995 to 2002 and the 56th Treasurer of the Law Society of Upper Canada from 1999 to 2001. He is also a former member of the Board of Regents of the American College of Trial Lawyers, and the former president of the Canadian Institute for Advanced Legal Studies.

== Ontario Court of Appeal ==
Armstrong was appointed to the Ontario Court of Appeal on January 25, 2002. He was one of the last judges on the Court of Appeal to not have previously held a judicial position, which was previously a widespread practice for federal appointments. In October 2002, Armstrong was awarded a Doctor of Law (LLD) honorary degree by the Law Society of Upper Canada for his contributions to Canadian law.

In December 2008, Armstrong wrote the majority decision upholding a lower court's decision that unions cannot force courts to enforce fines it imposes on its members who cross picket lines. Armstrong, with Justice Paul Rouleau concurring, found that the union's constitution created a power imbalance with its members, making it unconscionable for the court to enforce the fines. Armstrong's colleague, Justice Russell G. Juriansz, dissented saying that the imbalance of power had not been abused and the workers were always free to leave the union. The union in the case applied for leave to appeal the case to the Supreme Court of Canada, but the application was dismissed with costs.

In February 2009, Armstrong wrote a decision holding that a defendant had correctly been found guilty of criminal harassment even though there was no previous contact and there was only a single incident, unlike the repetitive nature of traditional stalking cases. Armstrong wrote that this was because the defendant's actions – jumping out of a bush at the complainant and chasing her down a street – were "highly threatening and persistent" and had caused the complainant to reasonably fear for her safety. The defendant's application for leave to appeal to the Supreme Court was dismissed.

In February 2013, Armstrong, supported by the other two Court of Appeal judges hearing the case, dismissed the appeal in R v Fearon. Armstrong wrote that Fearon's right to privacy was not violated because a cellphone without password protection can be searched by police during an arrest without a warrant. Armstrong's decision was appealed to the Supreme Court, which dismissed the appeal in a 4–3 decision in 2014.

Armstrong became a supernumerary judge for the court in September 2012, and was replaced as a full-time judge by Peter Lauwers from the Ontario Superior Court of Justice. Armstrong retired in March 2013 upon reaching the mandatory retirement age of 75.

== Post-judicial career ==
A year after retiring from the Court of Appeal in 2013, Armstrong joined Arbitration Place, a Canadian arbitration firm, as a resident arbitrator and mediator. Armstrong was also a Distinguished Visiting Jurist for the 2013 – 2014 school year at the University of Toronto Faculty of Law.
