= Kompetenz-kompetenz =

Legal doctrine on jurisdiction

Kompetenz-kompetenz, or competence-competence, is a jurisprudential doctrine whereby a legal body, such as a court or arbitral tribunal, may have competence, or jurisdiction, to rule as to the extent of its own competence on an issue before it. The concept arose in the Federal Constitutional Court of Germany. Since then, kompetenz-kompetenz has often been important in international arbitration.

== In arbitration ==
The doctrine was first embodied in a multilateral treaty with Article 53 of the Second Hague Convention of 1907 recognizing the Permanent Court of Arbitration's competence to decide its jurisdiction under forced arbitration clauses in treaties.

The doctrine of kompetenz-kompetenz is enshrined in the UNCITRAL Model Law on International Commercial Arbitration and Arbitration Rules. Article 16(1) of the Model Law and article 23(1) of the Arbitration Rules both dictate that "[t]he arbitral tribunal shall have the power to rule on its own jurisdiction, including any objections with respect to the existence or validity of the arbitration agreement." United States arbitration law does not expressly address the principle of kompetenz-kompetenz, but courts have consistently recognized such a power where the parties have granted it to the tribunal.

== See also ==
- Parliamentary sovereignty
- Primacy of European Union law
