= Ukrainian Arbitration Association =

- Company type: Not-for-profit
- Industry: arbitration
- Founded: 2012
- Headquarters: 4-B Grushevskogo Str., Ofc. 27, Kyiv 01001, Ukraine, Kyiv, Ukraine
- Website: www.arbitration.kiev.ua

The Ukrainian Arbitration Association (UAA) (Українська Арбітражна Асоціація) – is a nonprofit organisation, founded in September 2012 by the initiative group of Ukrainian and foreign experts in international arbitration to unite lawyers (irrespective of their nationality or place of residence) who are professionally engaged or interested in international arbitration.

The Association is not an arbitration institution. Moreover, it intends to cooperate with arbitration institutions and similar professional associations on the development and promotion of international arbitration. Membership in the Ukrainian Arbitration Association is open to all persons with a law degree, having professional interest in international arbitration and sharing the goals and objectives of the Association. Students can join the Association as associate members.

== Key Goals ==
The key goals of the Association include, first of all, the promotion of Ukraine, and Kyiv in particular, as the seat of arbitration, facilitation and support of interest in international arbitration, extension of knowledge and exchange of experience in cross-border dispute resolution, as well as enhancement of cooperation and communication among practitioners in international arbitration around the world.

Achieving these goals requires, inter alia, the improvement of Ukrainian legislation in the field of international arbitration and development of arbitration-friendly court practice. The Association is also planning to carry out a range of educational activities as well as to provide Ukrainian and foreign lawyers with the most rapid and convenient access to information on international arbitration in Ukraine.
