= Lawyer-supported mediation =

Lawyer-supported mediation is a "non-adversarial method of alternative dispute resolution (ADR) to resolves disputes, such as to settle family issues at a time of divorce or separation, including child support, custody issues and division of property".

The approach sets out to integrate the contribution of family lawyer or solicitor with that of a family mediator. Users of lawyer-supported mediation first meet their respective lawyers to take advice before jointly attending mediation sessions. Legal advice is taken between sessions to inform options being discussed at mediation. Following mediation, the lawyers are called upon to review any agreement reached and to make aspects of it made legally binding. Since neither lawyer is initially being retained as a negotiator or litigator, the cost of legal advice is typically fixed for clients choosing lawyer-supported mediation.

In the event of lawyer-supported mediation failing to deliver a partial or full agreement, both parties are free to retain their respective lawyers to pursue litigation. This is not the case with collaborative law where a breakdown in roundtable negotiations requires each party to instruct a new family lawyer before proceeding with court action.

== United Kingdom ==
Lawyer-supported mediation is being pioneered in the United Kingdom (UK). A pilot service covering Greater London began in 2012. More recently, UK retail giant the Co-op launched a fixed fee legal advice service for clients choosing family mediation.

According to figures released by the UK's Legal Services Commission, the success rate of publicly funded mediations in 2009/2010 stood at 70%.

== United States ==
In 1989, Arlen F. Gregorio created the first law partnership that focused exclusively on the mediation of civil trial matters. The firm is known as Gregorio, Haldeman & Rotman and is located in San Francisco.

== See also ==
- Arbitration
- Collaborative law
- Alternative dispute resolution
