= Expert determination =

Expert determination is a historically accepted form of dispute resolution invoked when there is not a formulated dispute in which the parties have defined positions that need to be subjected to arbitration, but rather both parties are in agreement that there is a need for an evaluation.

== Process ==
Expert determination is described as a procedure by which the parties to a dispute (e.g. technical, scientific, or business dispute) appoint an independent and neutral expert to determine the dispute in private. Like arbitration, it allows trade secrets and other sensitive information to be kept out of the public domain. The expert will be a person with specialist or technical knowledge relevant to the dispute. His experience and professional knowledge are expected to help solve the dispute since legal arbitrators or the arbitral tribunal are often unable to resolve technical issues even with the help of expert witnesses. Unlike arbitration, not all of the evidence an expert considers must be presented at a hearing in the presence of the parties.

The practice itself is well established where complex legal institutions either have not developed, or are unavailable, such as tribal societies and criminal organisations.

In the context of modern jurisprudence, the word "expert" appears first in Bottomley v Ambler 1878 38 LT 545, this was however used ambiguously also referring to arbitrators having the qualification of expert. The first mention that distinguishes specifically against the practise of arbitration, and introduces the formula "as an expert and not as an arbitrator" was in Dean v. Prince 1953 Ch. 590 at 591 (misquoted) and subsequently on appeal in the year 1954 1 Ch. 409 at 415. In Contract Law, the parties are free to include a forum selection clause appointing a special referee to resolve specialised but disputed factual issues between them.

The so-called dispute boards, which are commonly used in resolving construction contract disputes, are considered a specialized form of expert determination.
