= Arbitration award =

In arbitration, equivalent to court judgement

An arbitration award (or arbitral award) is a final determination on the jurisdiction, merits, costs or other aspect of a dispute by an arbitration tribunal in an arbitration, and is analogous to a judgment in a court of law. It is referred to as an 'award' even where all of the claimant's claims fail (and thus no money needs to be paid by either party), or the award is of a non-monetary nature.

== Damages and other remedies ==
Although a successful party in arbitration will typically be awarded compensation or damages, tribunals usually have a range of remedies that can form a part of the award.

1. the tribunal may order the payment of a sum of money (conventional damages)
2. the tribunal may make a "declaration" as to any matter to be determined in the proceedings
3. in most jurisdictions, the tribunal has the same power as a court to:
  1. order a party to do or refrain from doing something ("injunctive relief")
  2. to order specific performance of a contract
  3. to order the rectification, setting aside or cancellation of a deed or other document.

== Enforcement of arbitration awards ==
Arbitration is particularly popular as a means of dispute resolution in the commercial sphere (for a summary of the various arenas in which arbitration is usually chosen, see the specific article on "arbitration"). One of the reasons for doing so is that, in international trade, it is often easier to enforce an arbitration award in a foreign country than it is to enforce a judgment of the court.

Under the New York Convention 1958, an award issued in a contracting state can generally be freely enforced in any other contracting state, only subject to certain, limited defences. Those defences are:

1. a party to the arbitration agreement was, under the law applicable to him, under some incapacity, or the arbitration agreement was not valid under its governing law;
2. a party was not given proper notice of the appointment of the arbitrator or of the arbitration proceedings, or was otherwise unable to present its case;
3. the award deals with an issue not contemplated by or not falling within the terms of the submission to arbitration, or contains matters beyond the scope of the arbitration (subject to the proviso that an award which contains decisions on such matters may be enforced to the extent that it contains decisions on matters submitted to arbitration which can be separated from those matters not so submitted);
4. the composition of the arbitral authority was not in accordance with the agreement of the parties or, failing such agreement, with the law of the place where the hearing took place (the "lex loci arbitri");
5. the award has not yet become binding upon the parties, or has been set aside or suspended by a competent authority, either in the country where the arbitration took place, or pursuant to the law of the arbitration agreement;
6. the subject matter of the award was not capable of resolution by arbitration; or
7. enforcement would be contrary to "public policy".

Virtually every significant commercial country in the world is a party to the Convention, but relatively few countries have a comprehensive network for cross-border enforcement of judgments of the court. Hence in many countries, particularly in emerging markets, a foreign arbitration award is much easier to enforce than an award of the court. For example, it is very difficult to enforce foreign judgments in the former CIS countries, but it is considerably easier to enforce awards of an arbitration tribunal.

The other characteristic of cross-border enforcement of arbitration awards that makes them appealing to commercial parties is that they are not limited to awards of damages. Whereas in most countries only monetary judgments are enforceable in the cross-border context, no such restrictions are imposed on arbitration awards and so it is theoretically possible (although unusual in practice) to obtain an injunction or an order for specific performance in an arbitration proceeding which could then be enforced in another New York Convention contracting state.

The New York Convention is not actually the only treaty dealing with cross-border enforcement of arbitration awards. The earlier Geneva Convention on the Execution of Foreign Arbitral Awards 1927 remains in force, but the success of the New York Convention means that the Geneva Convention is rarely utilised in practise.

=== Arbitration with sovereign governments ===
In judicial proceedings in many countries, governments enjoy sovereign immunity from suit. However, governments can submit to arbitration, and certain international conventions exist in relation to the enforcement of awards against nation states.

- The Washington Convention 1965 relates to settlement of investment disputes between nation states and citizens of other countries. The Convention created the International Centre for Settlement of Investment Disputes (or ICSID). The Convention was primarily designed to create investor confidence, and to promote inward investment into developing countries. The ICSID Convention and ICSID Arbitration Rules are the most commonly used arbitration rules for the settlement of investment disputes.
- The Algiers Declaration of 1981 established the Iran-US Claims Tribunal to adjudicate claims of American corporations and individuals in relation to expropriated property during the Islamic revolution in Iran in 1979. Although formed in good faith, the tribunal has not been a notable success, and has even been held by an English court to be void under its own governing law.

== Nomenclature ==
Although it is common to talk of an arbitration award as a single concept, in most legal jurisdictions there are several sub-categories of award.

1. a provisional award is an award on a provisional basis subject to the final determination of the merits.
2. a partial award is an award of only part of the claims or cross claims which are brought, or a determination of only certain issues between the parties. Importantly, this leaves it open to the parties to either resolve or to continue to arbitrate (or litigate) the remaining issues.
3. an agreed award is usually in the form of a settlement between the parties of their dispute (the equivalent of a judgment by consent). But by embodying the settlement in the form of an award it can have a number of advantages.
4. a reasoned award is not a sub-category of award, but is used to describe an award where the tribunal sets out its reasoning for its decision.
5. an additional award is an award which the tribunal, by its own initiative or on the application of a party makes in respect of any claim which was presented to the tribunal but was not resolved under the principal award.
6. a draft award is not an award as such, and is not binding on the parties until confirmed by the tribunal.

== Legal requirements ==
The legal requirements relating to the making of awards vary from country to country and, in some cases, according to the terms of the arbitration agreement. Although in most countries, awards can be oral, this is relatively uncommon and they are usually delivered in writing.

By way of example, in England and Wales, the following are requirements under the Arbitration Act 1996 which the award must comply with, unless the parties agree to vary them under section 52 of the Act:

1. the award must be in writing and signed by all of the arbitrators assenting to the award (dissenting minority arbitrators need not sign unless the parties agree that they must);
2. the award must contain reasons;
3. the award must state the "seat" of the arbitration (the place where the arbitration took place); and
4. the award must state the date upon which it is made. This is important for the calculation of interest.

Many countries have similar requirements, but most permit the parties to vary the conditions, which reflects the fact that arbitration is a party-driven process.

== Appeals ==
It is sometimes said that arbitration awards are not normally subject to appeal (often another reason given in favour of using arbitration), but that is usually an oversimplification.

Most countries in the world allow arbitration awards to be "challenged" in the court, although they usually limit the circumstances in which such challenges may be brought. The two most commonly permitted grounds of challenge are:

1. that the tribunal did not have jurisdiction to make the award; or
2. serious irregularity on the part of the tribunal.

Arbitration awards are non-justiciable. Distinguish from an "expert determination" where the expert determines a matter of fact (which is ordinarily not subject to any form of appeal at all, except in cases of obvious bias or manifest error or bad faith).

In addition, although not by way of challenge, many countries permit appeals on a point of law (although almost no countries permit appeals to be made in relation to findings of fact). This right is usually closely circumscribed to avoid undermining the commercial efficacy of arbitration.

== See also ==
- Adjudication
- Arbitration
- Dispute resolution
- Expert determination
- Industrial award
- International arbitration
- Lex loci arbitri
