= Arbitral tribunal =

Panel convened to resolve a dispute by way of arbitration

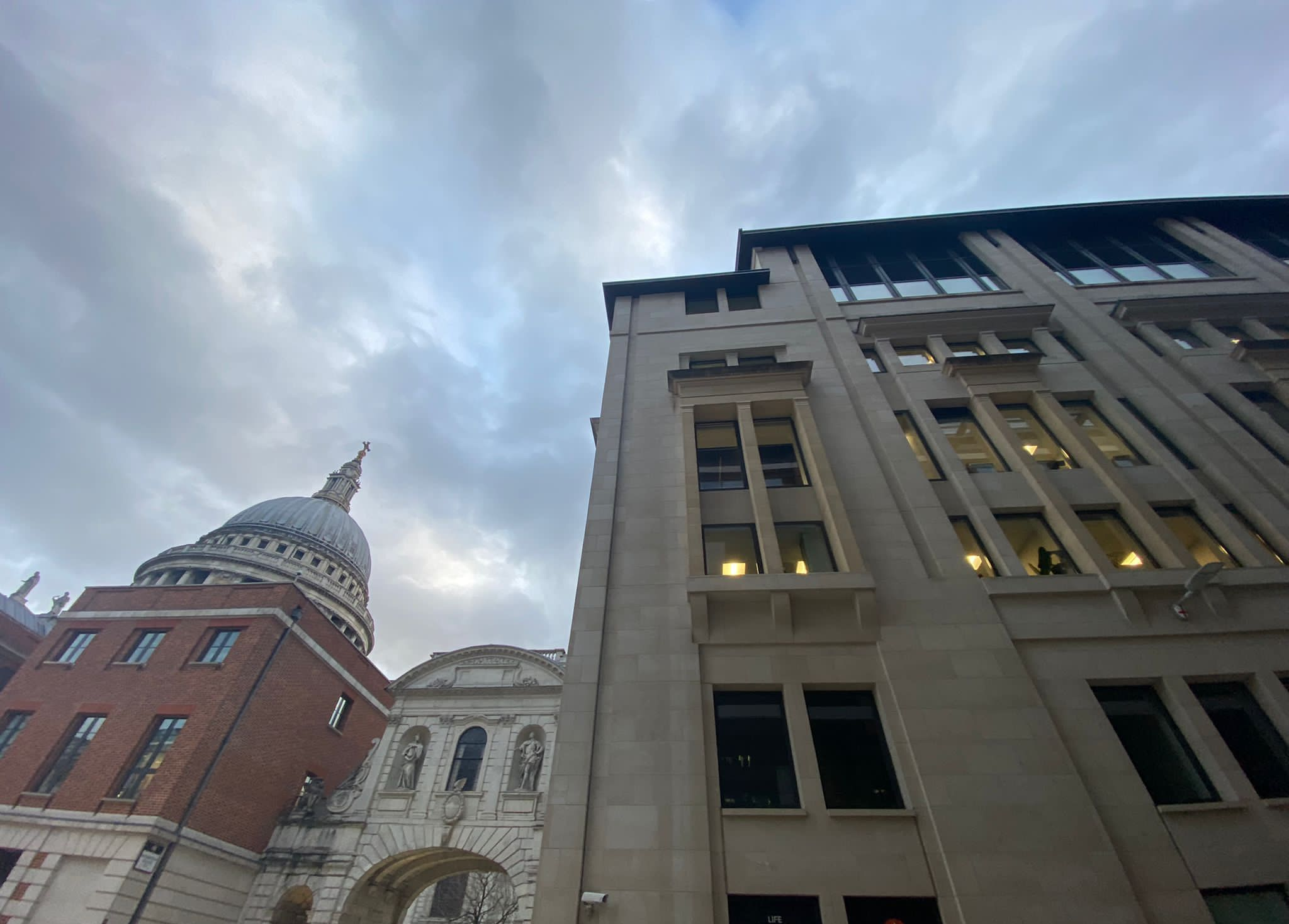
The London Court of International Arbitration

An arbitral tribunal or arbitration tribunal, also arbitration commission, arbitration committee or arbitration council is a panel of adjudicators which is convened and sits to resolve a dispute by way of arbitration. The tribunal may consist of a sole arbitrator, or there may be two or more arbitrators, which might include a chairperson or an umpire. The tribunal usually consists of an odd number of arbitrators. Members selected to serve on an arbitration panel are typically professionals with expertise in both law and in friendly dispute resolution (mediation). Some scholars have suggested that the ideal composition of an arbitration commission should include at least also one professional in the field of the disputed situation (for instance an economist) in cases that involve questions of asset or damages valuation.

The parties to agree on arbitration are usually free to determine the number and composition of the arbitral tribunal. Many jurisdictions have laws with general rulings in arbitration, they differ as to how many arbitrators should constitute the tribunal if there is no agreement. In some legal systems, an arbitration clause which provides for an even number of arbitrators is understood to imply that the appointed arbitrators will select an additional arbitrator as a chairperson, to avoid deadlock arising.

Arbitral tribunals are usually constituted (appointed) in two types of proceedings:

- ad hoc arbitration proceedings are those in which the arbitrators are appointed by the parties without a supervising institution, relying instead on the rules that have been agreed upon by the parties and/or procedural law and courts of the place of arbitration to resolve any differences over the appointment, replacement, or authority of any or all of the arbitrators; and
- institutional arbitration proceedings are those in which the arbitrators are appointed under the supervision of professional bodies providing arbitration services, such as the American Arbitration Association (which conducts international proceedings through its New York–based division, the ICDR), the Australian Fair Work Commission, the LCIA in London, the ICC in Paris or, for investment disputes, the International Centre for Settlement of Investment Disputes (ICSID). Depending on their establishing statutes or treaties, these kinds of institutions can be capable of supervising the appointment of arbitration commissions in one country or on an international scale. This type of arbitration avoids the need for parties to involve local courts and procedures in the event of disagreement over the appointment, replacement, or authority of any or all of the arbitrators.

Permanent arbitration committees tend to have their own rules and procedures, and tend to be more formal. They also tend to be more expensive, and, for procedural reasons, slower.

== Appointment ==
The parties are generally free to determine their own procedure for appointing the arbitrator or arbitrators, including the procedure for the selection of an umpire or chairperson. If the parties decline to specify the mode for selecting the arbitrators, then the relevant legal system will usually provide a default selection process. Characteristically, appointments will usually be made on the following basis:

- If the tribunal is to consist of a sole arbitrator, the parties shall jointly appoint the arbitrator not later than (for example) 28 days after service of a request in writing by either party to do so.
- If the tribunal is to consist of three arbitrators:

1. each party shall appoint one arbitrator not later than (for example) 14 days after service of a request in writing by either party to do so, and
2. the two so appointed shall forthwith appoint a third arbitrator as the chairperson of the tribunal.

- If the tribunal is to consist of two arbitrators and an umpire:

1. each party shall appoint one arbitrator not later than (for example) 14 days after service of a request in writing by either party to do so, and
2. the two so appointed may appoint an umpire at any time after they themselves are appointed and shall do so before any substantive hearing or forthwith if they cannot agree on a matter relating to the arbitration.

Most arbitration clauses will provide a nominated person or body to select a sole arbitrator if the parties are unable to agree (for example, the President of the relevant jurisdiction's Bar Association, or a recognised professional arbitration organisation such as the LCIA, or a relevant professional organisation). In default of such a provision, where the parties are unable to agree, an application for an appointment is usually made to the court.

Normally a well drafted arbitration clause will also make provision for where a party to the dispute seeks to cause delay by refusing to make or agree an appointment. Often this will allow the "non-defaulting" party to appoint a sole arbitrator and for the arbitration to proceed on that basis.

=== Chairperson and umpire ===
Where the tribunal consists of an odd number of arbitrators, one of them may be designated as the umpire or chairperson. The selection of title carries some significance. When an arbitrator is "chairperson", then they will not usually exercise any special or additional powers, and merely have a presidential function as the tribunal member who sets the agenda. Where a member of the tribunal is an umpire, they usually do not exercise any influence on proceedings, unless the other arbitrators are unable to agree — in such cases, then the umpire steps in and makes the decision alone.

=== Arbitrator advocates ===
In some legal systems, it used to be common for each party to the dispute to appoint an arbitrator and for those two arbitrators to appoint a third arbitrator (who may or may not be called an umpire). However, the two arbitrators appointed by the parties to the dispute would essentially act as advocates for the party who appointed them, and the umpire would effectively act as a sole arbitrator. Such systems can lead to difficulty, as other countries may be reluctant to enforce an arbitration award where two of the three "arbitrators" are clearly unable to demonstrate impartiality or independence. The standards for enforcing such awards are set out in the New York Convention, as interpreted by local law.

== Removal ==
In most legal systems the parties are free to specify in what circumstances the appointment of an arbitrator may be revoked. In default, most legal systems provide either that (i) the parties to the dispute must act jointly to remove an arbitrator, or (ii) the other members of the arbitral tribunal must act to remove the arbitrator, and/or (iii) the court must act to remove an arbitrator. Most legal systems reserve a power to the court to remove arbitrators who are unfit to act, or are not impartial.

=== Resignation ===
It is generally accepted that one cannot force a person to continue as an arbitrator against their will, and arbitrators may resign if they are unwilling to proceed with the arbitration. Where the arbitrator becomes aware of facts that might be seen to affect his or her impartiality, they are often under a duty to resign. The parties are generally free to agree with the arbitrator what should happen with respect to (i) the arbitrator's fees, and (ii) any liability of the arbitrator (such as wasted costs), if the arbitrator should resign, with or without cause.

=== Death ===
The authority of an arbitrator is personal, and an appointment ceases upon death.

Unless the parties have otherwise provided, the death of a party does not usually revoke the appointment of any arbitrator appointed by the deceased, and any agreement relating to the appointment is enforceable in the usual way against the personal representatives of the deceased.

=== Filling a vacancy ===
If a vacancy arises (through resignation or death, or otherwise) then the parties are free to agree:

1. whether, and if so, how, the vacancy shall be filled
2. whether, and if so, to what extent, the previous proceedings shall stand
3. what effect, if any, the arbitrator's ceasing to hold office has on any appointment or order made by that arbitrator (alone or jointly)

Most legal systems provide that, in default of agreement, a new arbitrator shall be appointed using the provision for appointments which applied to the original arbitrator that has vacated office; the tribunal itself (once reconstituted) should determine whether, and if so, to what extent, previous proceedings stand; and the appointments and orders made by the previous arbitrator are unaffected.

== Fees and expenses ==
The parties may make provision for the arbitrator's fees (although in some jurisdictions, whether the parties are agreeing to submit an existing dispute to arbitration, they may not provide that each party bears its own costs). However, the position may be different between, on the one hand, as between the arbitrators and the parties, and on the other hand, as between the parties themselves.

Although the parties may provide differently in the appointment of the arbitrator, the usual rule is that the parties are jointly and severally liable for the arbitrator's fees. If the arbitrator is not paid, then they may sue either or both parties for unpaid fees.

In many jurisdictions, after making the award, the tribunal will order that the losing party pays the legal costs of the winning party, and this may include the arbitrator's fees. This does not affect the joint and several liability referred to above, but it does mean that the winning party may maintain a separate action against the losing party for the unpaid costs, or to be reimbursed for arbitrator's fees that the winning party has been forced to pay, but which the losing party was ordered to pay.

== Immunity from suit ==
It is generally accepted that an arbitrator is not liable for anything done or omitted to be done in the discharge of his or her duties as an arbitrator unless bad faith is shown. At common law this point was thought to have been left open, but in most jurisdictions it is accepted that arbitrators should enjoy immunity provided that they act in good faith in the same manner (and for much the same reasons) as judges, and some jurisdictions have clarified this by statute.

== Jurisdiction ==
In most legal systems, the arbitral tribunal is able to rule upon its own jurisdiction (often referred to as the doctrine of "Kompetenz-Kompetenz" in international law). This enables the arbitral tribunal to determine for itself whether:

1. an arbitration agreement is valid,
2. whether the tribunal has been properly constituted under applicable law, and
3. what matters are to be determined by the arbitration under the agreement.

The doctrine, although European in origin, has been recognised at common law, and has now been widely codified into national law.

== Hearing ==
An "arbitration hearing" can be either procedural or evidentiary. As in court systems, a "procedural hearing" focuses exclusively on how the proceedings are to be conducted. An "evidentiary hearing" is the equivalent to what in the courts of many countries would be called a trial, with the presentation of evidence in the form of documents and witnesses. Although evidentiary hearings are generally available as a means to assist the arbitral tribunal in deciding contested factual issues, arbitration rules do not usually require them and leave the means of decided disputed factual issues to the discretion of the tribunal. Many decisions of arbitral tribunals are made without any hearing at all.

Where it may be appropriate to do so, arbitral tribunals can make decisions solely upon documentary evidence, which may or may not be accompanied by witness statements, which in the US are referred to as affidavits. Witness statements represent the testimony a witness would give if called to testify, and on which the witness is subject to questioning by the arbitral tribunal and, at times, cross examination by the other party.

Specific types of arbitration, for example, may rely exclusively on documents to decide disputes, such as in the growing field of online dispute resolution. As part of their organizational bylaws or standard terms and conditions, some organizations may also provide that disputes shall be arbitrated without an oral hearing and upon documentary evidence only, an example being certain trade associations, such as GAFTA.

== Duties ==
The duties of a tribunal will be determined by a combination of the provisions of the arbitration agreement and by the procedural laws which apply in the seat of the arbitration. The extent to which the laws of the seat of the arbitration permit "party autonomy" (the ability of the parties to set out their own procedures and regulations) determines the interplay between the two.

However, in almost all countries the tribunal owes several non-derogable duties. These will normally be:

- to act fairly and impartially between the parties, and to allow each party a reasonable opportunity to put their case and to deal with the case of their opponent (sometimes shortened to: complying with the rules of "natural justice"); and
- to adopt procedures suitable to the circumstances of the particular case, so as to provide a fair means for resolution of the dispute.

In a case arbitrated under English law, Waller LJ noted that where an arbitrator recognises that a party in arbitration has missed a point that could be argued, "fairness requires the arbitrator to raise it so that the party can deal with it".

=== Procedure ===
Matters of procedure are normally determined either by the law of the seat of the arbitration, or by the tribunal itself under its own inherent jurisdiction (depending on national law). Procedural matters normally include:

- mode of submitting (and challenging) evidence
- time and place of the hearing
- language and translations
- disclosure of documents and other evidence
- use of pleadings and/or interrogatories
- use of legal advisors
- the appointment of experts and assessors

=== Appeals ===
Provisions relating to appeals vary widely between different jurisdictions, but most legal systems recognise that the right to appeal (or, technically, the right to seek to set aside) an award in an arbitration should be limited.

Usually such challenges are made on one of two bases:

1. that the tribunal did not have substantive jurisdiction to determine the matter; or
2. there was a serious irregularity on the part of the tribunal. Examples of serious irregularities may include:
  1. failure of the tribunal to act in accordance with the rules of natural justice, or allowing a fair hearing;
  2. the tribunal exceeding its powers (other than by exceeding its jurisdiction);
  3. failure of the tribunal to conduct proceedings in accordance with the procedure agreed by the parties;
  4. failure of the tribunal to deal with all the issues put to it for resolution;
  5. uncertainty or ambiguity as to the effect of the award;
  6. the award being procured by fraud, or otherwise being procured in a way contrary to public policy;
  7. failure to comply with the requirements for the form of the award (e.g. in writing or in a specific language);
  8. irregularities in the conduct of the proceedings.

In some jurisdictions it is also possible to appeal against an award on a point of law, however, such appeals normally require either the permission of the other parties, or the leave of the court.

== Specialized institutions ==
Specialized arbitration organizations have been formed in order to settle disputes in the matter of resolution. They work in a limited field with expertise. For this purpose special rules have been made, including procedures and regulations which they follow during the proceedings of arbitration. These institutions are proven to be useful in the cases where a deep and expert knowledge is needed in settlement, which in return can be cost effective and time saving.

Such specialized institutions include:

1. Arbitration and Mediation Center, WIPO
2. Centre for Effective Dispute Resolution CEDR
3. German Maritime Arbitration Association
4. Maritime Arbitration Association of the United States
5. Tokyo Maritime Arbitration Association

== See also ==
- American Arbitration Association
- Arbitration
- Arbitration award
- Chartered Institute of Arbitrators
- International arbitration
- International Chamber of Commerce
- London Court of International Arbitration
- UNCITRAL Model Law on International Commercial Arbitration
