= Dispute pyramid =

A dispute pyramid is an upside-down triangle that illustrates how many grievances result in legal proceedings, such as a trial or hearing. Court filings are at the bottom as the smallest amount, then lawyers, then claims, and finally grievances at the top with the largest number. It demonstrates how a large number of grievances, for example, one thousand, will filter down to around seven hundred claims, only one hundred lawyers will be hired, and only fifty court filings will occur out of those one thousand grievances. Researchers believe that approximately one in every twenty cases that could potentially be brought to court will actually be brought to court. The reason for this phenomenon is the existence of settlements outside the court itself, and the pyramid demonstrates this through numbers.
