= Dispute resolution =

Act of resolving disputes between parties

Dispute resolution or dispute settlement is the process of resolving disputes between parties. The term dispute resolution is conflict resolution through legal means.

Prominent venues for dispute settlement in international law include the International Court of Justice (formerly the Permanent Court of International Justice); the United Nations Human Rights Committee (which operates under the ICCPR) and European Court of Human Rights; the Panels and Appellate Body of the World Trade Organization; and the International Tribunal for the Law of the Sea. Half of all international agreements include a dispute settlement mechanism.

States are also known to form their own arbitration tribunals to settle disputes. Prominent private international courts, which adjudicate disputes between commercial private entities, include the International Court of Arbitration (of the International Chamber of Commerce) and the London Court of International Arbitration.

== Methods ==
Methods of dispute resolution include:

- lawsuits (litigation) (legislative)
- arbitration
- collaborative law
- mediation
- conciliation
- negotiation
- facilitation
- avoidance

Dispute resolution processes fall into two major types:

1. Adjudicative processes, such as litigation or arbitration, in which a judge, jury or arbitrator determines the outcome.
2. Consensual processes, such as collaborative law, mediation, conciliation, or negotiation, in which the parties attempt to reach agreement.

Not all disputes, even those in which skilled intervention occurs, end in resolution. Such intractable disputes form a special area in dispute resolution studies.

Dispute resolution is an important requirement in international trade, including negotiation, mediation, arbitration and litigation.

== Legal dispute resolution ==
The legal system provides resolutions for many different types of disputes. Some disputants will not reach agreement through a collaborative process. Some disputes need the coercive power of the state to enforce a resolution. Perhaps more importantly, many people want a professional advocate when they become involved in a dispute, particularly if the dispute involves perceived legal rights, legal wrongdoing, or threat of legal action against them.

The most common form of judicial dispute resolution is litigation. Litigation is initiated when one party files suit against another. In the United States, litigation is facilitated by the government within federal, state, and municipal courts. While litigation is often used to resolve disputes, it is strictly speaking a form of conflict adjudication and not a form of conflict resolution per se. This is because litigation only determines the legal rights and obligations of parties involved in a dispute and does not necessarily solve the disagreement between the parties involved in the dispute. For example, supreme court cases can rule on whether US states have the constitutional right to criminalize abortion but will not cause the parties involved in the case to no longer disagree on whether states do indeed have the constitutional authority to restrict access to abortion as one of the parties may disagree with the supreme courts reasoning and still disagree with the party that the supreme court sided with. Litigation proceedings are very formal and are governed by rules, such as rules of evidence and procedure, which are established by the legislature. Outcomes are decided by an impartial judge and/or jury, based on the factual questions of the case and the application law. The verdict of the court is binding, not advisory; however, both parties have the right to appeal the judgment to a higher court. Judicial dispute resolution is typically adversarial in nature, for example, involving antagonistic parties or opposing interests seeking an outcome most favorable to their position.

Due to the antagonistic nature of litigation, collaborators frequently opt for solving disputes privately.

Retired judges or private lawyers often become arbitrators or mediators; however, trained and qualified non-legal dispute resolution specialists form a growing body within the field of alternative dispute resolution (ADR). In the United States, many states now have mediation or other ADR programs annexed to the courts, to facilitate settlement of lawsuits.

== Extrajudicial dispute resolution ==
Some use the term dispute resolution to refer to alternative dispute resolution (ADR), that is, extra processes such as arbitration, collaborative law, and mediation used to resolve conflict and potential conflict between and among individuals, business entities, governmental agencies, and (in the public international law context) states. ADR generally depends on agreement by the parties to use ADR processes, either before or after a dispute has arisen. ADR has experienced steadily increasing acceptance and utilization because of a perception of greater flexibility, costs below those of traditional litigation, and speedy resolution of disputes, among other perceived advantages. However, some have criticized these methods as taking away the right to seek redress of grievances in the courts, suggesting that extrajudicial dispute resolution may not offer the fairest way for parties not in an equal bargaining relationship, for example in a dispute between a consumer and a large corporation. In addition, in some circumstances, arbitration and other ADR processes may become as expensive as litigation or more so.

== See also ==
- Collaborative divorce
- Diplomacy
- Dispute pyramid
- Investor-state dispute settlement
- National Arbitration Forum
- Party-directed mediation
- Peacebuilding
- Peacekeeping
- Restorative justice
- UN Peacemaker
