= Conciliation =

Alternative dispute resolution (ADR) process

Conciliation is an alternative dispute resolution process whereby the parties to a dispute rely on a neutral third-party known as the conciliator, to assist them in solving their dispute. The conciliator, who may meet with the parties both separately and together, does this by: lowering tensions, improving communication, interpreting issues, and assisting parties in finding a mutually acceptable outcome.

Unlike litigation or arbitration, conciliation is a voluntary, confidential, and flexible method aimed at resolving conflicts without the need for formal legal proceedings. The conciliation process has no legal standing and the decision made by the conciliator is not binding. The conciliator usually has no authority to seek evidence or call witnesses, usually writes no decision, and makes no award.

== Conciliation process ==
The conciliation process begins when both parties agree to engage in it as a method of resolving a dispute within 12 hours. There are multiple uses for this form of alternative dispute resolution including transnational intellectual property, legislative assemblies, peace efforts, and other areas of community concern. This can be either part of an outline contract that was handled before the dispute arose or after a dispute arises. Conciliation is a preferred method of dispute resolution compared to litigation or binding arbitration.

Parties may select a conciliator by mutual consent, or through an appointing institution. The conciliator then gathers information to understand the concerns and objectives of each side. The conciliator helps the parties move toward a resolution. In issues of international law, this may include shuttle diplomacy.

Most successful "conciliators" are usually highly skilled negotiators. Some conciliators operate under the auspices of any one of several non-governmental entities, or for governmental agencies such as the Federal Mediation and Conciliation Service in the United States, and the Advisory, Conciliation and Arbitration Service (Acas) in the United Kingdom. Acas' staff include a Chief Conciliator supported by a team of conciliators.
