= Arbitration =

Method of dispute resolution

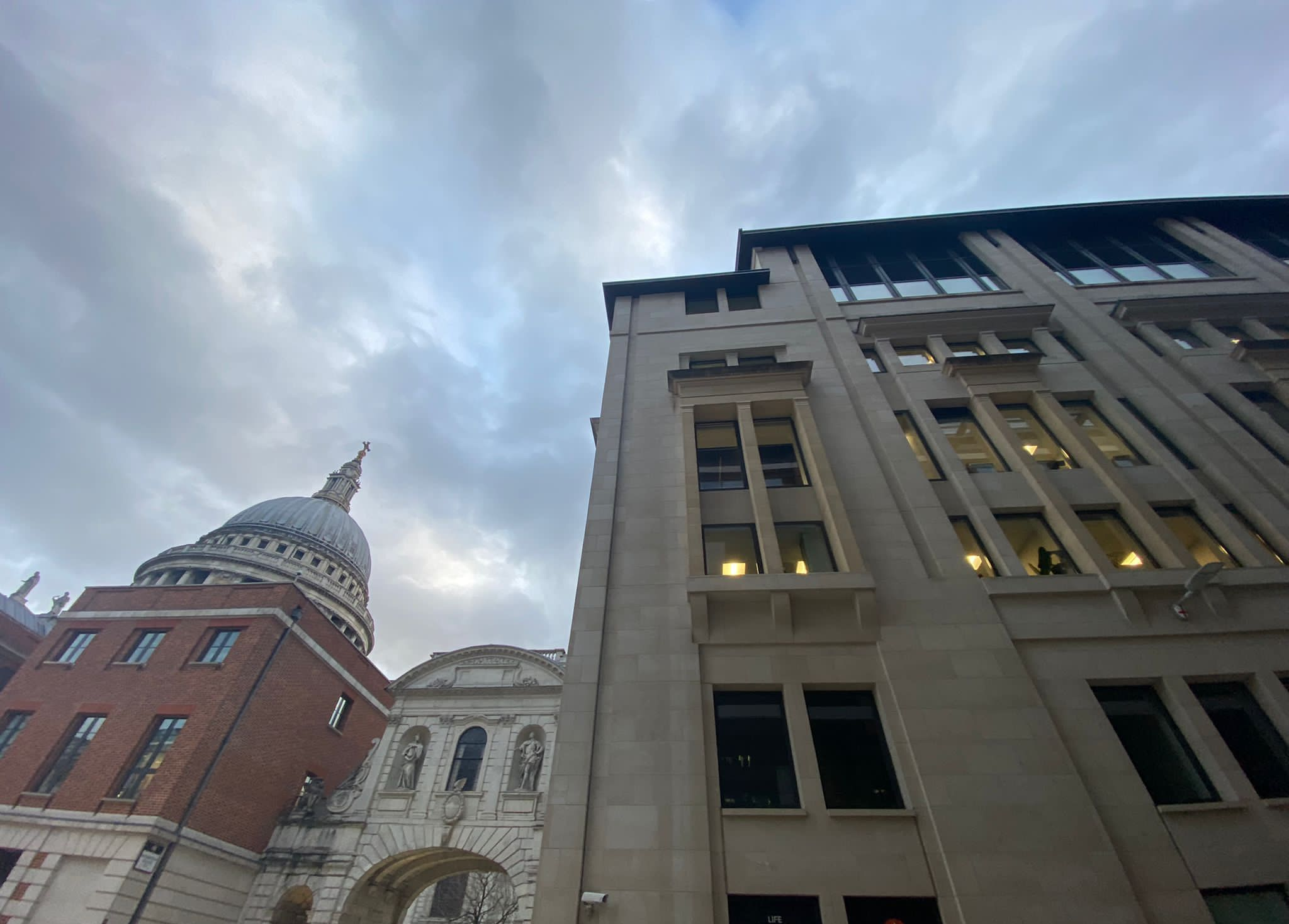
The London Court of International Arbitration

Arbitration is a formal method of dispute resolution involving a neutral person or entity who makes a binding decision (commonly called binding arbitration). The neutral third party (the 'arbitrator,' 'arbiter,' or 'arbitral tribunal') renders the decision in the form of an 'arbitration award'. An arbitration award is legally binding on both sides and enforceable in local courts, unless all parties stipulate that the arbitration process and decision are non-binding.

Arbitration is often used for the resolution of commercial disputes, particularly in the context of international commercial transactions. In certain countries, such as the United States, arbitration is also frequently employed in consumer and employment matters, where arbitration may be mandated by the terms of employment or commercial contracts and may include a waiver of the right to bring a class action claim. Mandatory consumer and employment arbitration should be distinguished from consensual arbitration, particularly commercial arbitration.

There are limited rights of review and appeal of arbitration awards. Arbitration is not the same as judicial proceedings (although in some jurisdictions, court proceedings are sometimes referred as arbitrations), alternative dispute resolution, expert determination, or mediation (a form of settlement negotiation facilitated by a neutral third party).

== Advantages and disadvantages ==
Parties often seek to resolve disputes through arbitration because of a number of perceived potential advantages over judicial proceedings. Companies often require arbitration with their customers but prefer the advantages of courts in disputes with competitors. Prevalent advantages of arbitration over litigation involve:

- Most importantly, the parties' ability to choose what substantive and procedural law governs the arbitration. This is often called the principle of 'party autonomy'.
- In contrast to litigation, where one cannot "choose the judge", arbitration allows the parties to choose their own tribunal, since it is the parties who appoint the arbitrators. This is especially useful when the subject matter of the dispute is highly technical: arbitrators with an appropriate degree of expertise (for example, quantity surveying expertise, in the case of a construction dispute, or expertise in commercial property law, in the case of a real estate dispute) can be chosen.
- Arbitration is supposed to be faster than litigation.
- Arbitral proceedings (other than investor-state arbitration) and arbitral awards can be made confidential.
- In arbitral proceedings the language of arbitration may be chosen, whereas in judicial proceedings the official language of the country of the competent court will be automatically applied.
- Because of the provisions of the New York Convention 1958, arbitration awards are generally easier to enforce in other nations than court verdicts.
- In most legal systems there are limited avenues for appeal of an arbitral award, which is sometimes an advantage because it limits the duration of the dispute and any associated liability.

Some of the disadvantages include:

- Agreeing to arbitrate often implies a waiver of the right to bring the same dispute to a court. This has been said to exacerbate imbalances of power between corporations and individuals as courts play a role in leveling the field between sophisticated and unsophisticated parties.
- Arbitration agreements are often difficult to identify in consumer and employee agreements.
- There is sometimes a disconnection between the presumption of confidentiality and the realities of disclosure and publicity imposed by the arbitrators, and even the parties themselves.
- If the arbitrator or the arbitration forum depends on the corporation for repeat business, there may be an inherent incentive to rule against the consumer or employee in favour of the corporation.
- There are limited avenues for appeal, an erroneous decision will therefore be harder to overturn.
- In some legal systems, arbitration awards have fewer enforcement options than judgments; although in the United States arbitration awards are enforced in the same manner as court judgments and have the same effect.
- Arbitrators may struggle to enforce interlocutory measures against parties. Parties have an easier time taking steps to avoid enforcement of member or a small group of members in arbitration due to increasing legal fees, without explaining to the members the adverse consequences of an unfavorable ruling.
- Discovery may be more limited in arbitration or entirely nonexistent.
- Enforcing arbitral awards generally requires a court procedure, this may increase costs, particularly where a party attempts to challenge the award at this stage.

== Arbitrability ==
By their nature, the subject matter of some disputes is not capable of arbitration. In general, two groups of legal procedures cannot be subjected to arbitration:

- Procedures which necessarily lead to a determination which the parties to the dispute may not enter into an agreement upon: Some court procedures lead to judgments which bind all members of the general public, or public authorities in their capacity as such, or third parties, or which are being conducted in the public interest. For example, until the 1980s, antitrust matters were not arbitrable in the United States. Matters relating to crimes, status and family law are generally not considered to be arbitrable, as the power of the parties to enter into an agreement upon these matters is at least restricted. However, most other disputes that involve private rights between two parties can be resolved using arbitration. In some disputes, parts of claims may be arbitrable and other parts not. For example, in a dispute over patent infringement, a determination of whether a patent has been infringed could be adjudicated upon by an arbitration tribunal, but the validity of a patent could not: As patents are subject to a system of public registration, an arbitral panel would have no power to order the relevant body to rectify any patent registration based upon its determination.
- Some legal orders exclude or restrict the possibility of arbitration for reasons of the protection of weaker members of the public, e.g. consumers. Examples: German law excludes disputes over the rental of living space from any form of arbitration, while arbitration agreements with consumers are only considered valid if they are signed by either party, and if the signed document does not bear any other content than the arbitration agreement.

== Arbitration agreement ==
Arbitration agreements are generally divided into two types:

- Agreements which provide that, if a dispute should arise, it will be resolved by arbitration. These will generally be normal contracts, but they contain an arbitration clause
- Agreements which are signed after a dispute has arisen, agreeing that the dispute should be resolved by arbitration (sometimes called a "submission agreement")

The former is the far more prevalent type of arbitration agreement. Sometimes, legal significance attaches to the type of arbitration agreement. For example, in certain Commonwealth countries (not including England and Wales), it is possible to provide that each party should bear their own costs in a conventional arbitration clause, but not in a submission agreement.

Parties to a non-contractual dispute may enact a submission agreement where the circumstances for an advance agreement to submit to arbitration did not arise, for example in tort cases such as personal injury claims.

In keeping with the informality of the arbitration process, the law is generally keen to uphold the validity of arbitration clauses even when they lack the normal formal language associated with legal contracts. Clauses which have been upheld include:

- "arbitration in London – English law to apply"
- "suitable arbitration clause"
- "arbitration, if any, by ICC Rules in London".

The courts have also upheld clauses which specify resolution of disputes other than in accordance with a specific legal system. These include provision indicating:

- That the arbitrators "must not necessarily judge according to the strict law but as a general rule ought chiefly to consider the principles of practical business"
- "internationally accepted principles of law governing contractual relations"

Agreements to refer disputes to arbitration are generally presumed to be separable from the rest of the contract. This means that an issue of validity pertaining to the contract as a whole will not automatically vitiate the validity of the agreement to arbitrate. For example, in disputes on a contract, a common defence is to plead the contract is void and thus any claim based upon it fails. It follows that if a party successfully claims that a contract is void, then each clause contained within the contract, including the arbitration clause, would be void. However, in most countries, the courts have accepted that:

1. A contract can only be declared void by a court or other tribunal; and
2. If the contract (valid or otherwise) contains an arbitration clause, then the proper forum to determine whether the contract is void or not, is the arbitration tribunal.

This protects the tribunal's ability to arbitrate beyond termination of the contract. Arguably, it is necessary to ensure that disputes are arbitrated rather than litigated—without such a clause, a dispute arising out of a contract will necessarily be litigated.

Arguably, either position is potentially unfair; if a person is made to sign a contract under duress, and the contract contains an arbitration clause highly favourable to the other party, the dispute may still referred to that arbitration tribunal. Conversely a court may be persuaded that the arbitration agreement itself is void having been signed under duress. However, most courts will be reluctant to interfere with the general rule which does allow for commercial expediency; any other solution (where one first had to go to court to decide whether one had to go to arbitration) would be self-defeating.

Companies' articles of association may include an arbitration clause, for example under Swiss company law. In the UK, the Association of British Insurers and the National Association of Pension Funds have both argued for restricted use of arbitration clauses in articles of association unless clear benefits and shareholder consent can both be evidenced.

== Comparative law ==
Nations regulate arbitration through a variety of laws. The main body of law applicable to arbitration is normally contained either in the national private international law statute, as is the case in Switzerland's Private International Law Statute (PILA), or in a separate law on arbitration, as is the case in England and Wales, the Republic of Korea and Jordan. In addition to this, a number of national procedural laws may also contain provisions relating to arbitration.

=== Colombia ===
In Colombia, arbitration is governed by Law 1563 of 2012 (General Statute of Arbitration), which modernized the framework and aligned it with the UNCITRAL Model Law on International Commercial Arbitration. The law establishes two parallel regimes: one for domestic arbitration and one for international arbitration. Arbitration clauses have become standard in most commercial contracts in Colombia, typically specifying the number of arbitrators and the allocation of costs between the parties, including arbitrators' fees and administration fees charged by the arbitration center. Arbitrators are selected from lists maintained by accredited arbitration centers such as the Centro de Arbitraje y Conciliación of the Bogotá Chamber of Commerce, which classifies arbitrators into categories according to the value of the dispute and the area of specialization.

Arbitral awards in Colombia may be challenged through an extraordinary annulment appeal (recurso de anulación). The main grounds for annulment, established in Article 41 of Law 1563 of 2012, include: the inexistence or absolute nullity of the arbitration agreement; irregular constitution of the tribunal or procedural irregularities; the award addressing matters not subject to arbitration (excess of jurisdiction); and contradictions in the operative part of the award that prevent its execution. Colombian courts consistently uphold valid arbitration agreements and recognize the principle of competence-competence, under which arbitral tribunals determine their own jurisdiction.

=== Arbitration law and procedure in Singapore ===
Presently, Singapore maintains two distinct frameworks under which contractual disputes can be arbitrated, which differ primarily in regard to the extent to which parties to the proceedings may resort to the courts. Under section 45 of the Arbitration Act 2001, either party or the arbitral tribunal itself may apply to the court to issue a ruling on "any question of law arising in the course of the proceedings which the Court is satisfied substantially affects the rights of one or more of the parties" and under section 49, either party may appeal an arbitral award on any question of law unless the parties have expressly excluded appeals the section. Either action is only permitted with the consent of the other parties or either the arbitral tribunal (for rulings on preliminary points of law) or the Court (with regard to appeals. This is in contrast to the International Arbitration Act 1994, which generally replicates the provisions of the UNCITRAL Model Law on International Commercial Arbitration and provides more restricted access to the courts.

In 2020, the Singapore Academy of Law published a report on the right of appeal in arbitral proceedings evaluating the advantages and disadvantages of the two distinct frameworks, concluding that the existence of appeals enables the development of case law and consequently provides greater certainty for parties to arbitral proceedings. The report identifies the availability of appeals by default under section 69 of England's Arbitration Act 1996 as a factor contributing to the popularity of London as a seat of arbitration in international contract disputes. Consequently, the report recommends amending the International Arbitration Act 1994 to enable parties to opt for a right of appeal in their arbitration agreement, thus enabling the development of case law and providing greater certainty for parties who desire it while maintaining an absence of appeals as the default position in order to cater to parties who desire a completely extrajudicial resolution of contractual disputes.

Uniquely, both the International Arbitration Act 1994 and the Arbitration Act 2001 contain provisions (Part 2A and Part 9A, respectively) explicitly authorising the arbitration of intellectual property disputes regardless of the extent to which the law of Singapore or any other jurisdiction expressly confers jurisdiction upon any designated body. This contrasts with the general approach taken by the majority of other jurisdictions and enables parties to foreign intellectual property disputes to seek resolution offshore without affecting the recognition of intellectual property rights in the jurisdictions in which they are issued.

=== Arbitration procedures in Italy ===
Italy takes a modern and open approach to arbitration, the main law on which is contained in Book IV, Chapter VIII of the Code of Civil Procedure (CCP). A number of provisions take their inspiration from the United Nations Commission on International Trade Law (UNCITRAL) Model Law on International Commercial Arbitration (the UNCITRAL Model Law). The provisions allow for proceedings to be conducted abroad and for the parties to agree to conduct an arbitration in any language. In March 2023, an important further mini-reform of the arbitration law entered into force, intended to remove some last remaining potential issues for foreign parties. In particular, the Italian Council of Ministers, through the recent reform known as "Cartabia", has introduced significant innovations in the field of arbitration by reorganising various institutions of civil procedure. The purpose of the reform, in accordance with the Recovery Plan for Europe, is to simplify and increase the overall efficiency of the Italian legal system. The amendments to the Fourth Book of the Italian Code of Civil Procedure (ICCP) aim to bring the arbitral decision ("lodo arbitrale") as close as possible to the judicial judgment ("sentenza"). In this respect, the reform constitutes the first major change to the Code since 2006, when the Italian system was, for the first time, partially aligned with the UNCITRAL Model Law. However, the last intervention is limited to specific aspects of the arbitral discipline, such as translatio iudicii, the principle of impartiality and independence of arbitrators, and the power to issue precautionary measures. It also pertains to corporate arbitration, which is now governed by the ICCP.

=== Arbitration procedures in the United States ===
The U.S. Supreme Court has held that the Federal Arbitration Act (FAA) of 1925 established a public policy in favor of arbitration. For the first six decades of its existence, courts did not allow arbitration for "federal statutory claims" through a bright-line "nonarbitrability" doctrine, but in the 1980s the Supreme Court of the United States reversed and began to use the act to require arbitration if included in the contract for federal statutory claims. Although some legal scholars believe that it was originally intended to apply to federal courts only, courts now routinely require arbitration due to the FAA regardless of state statutes or public policy unconscionability determinations by state courts. In consumer law, standard form contracts often include mandatory predispute arbitration clauses which require consumer arbitration. Under these agreements the consumer may waive their right to a lawsuit and a class action. In 2011, one of these clauses was upheld in AT&T Mobility v. Concepcion.

Several arbitration organizations exist, including the American Arbitration Association and JAMS. The National Arbitration Forum also conducts arbitrations, but it no longer conducts consumer arbitrations pursuant to a consent decree entered into in 2009 because of evidence that it had been biased toward, and had incentives that favored, credit card companies over cardholders. The AAA was also asked to exit the business, but has not done so.

=== Arbitration procedures in South Korea ===
The Korean Arbitration Act is the main law governing arbitration in the Republic of Korea. The official body which resolves disputes via arbitration is the Korean Commercial Arbitration Board. Legal professionals and corporations, in Korea, are increasingly preferring arbitration to litigation. The number of arbitrations, in Korea, is increasing year on year.

=== Arbitration procedures in North Korea ===
According to Michael Hay, a lawyer who specialised in North Korean law, North Korea has an advanced arbitration system even compared to developed countries, and foreign companies face an even playing field in dispute resolution. Arbitration cases could be concluded in as little as six months. According to Hay, North Korea maintains an advanced dispute resolution system in order to facilitate foreign investment.

== International ==
=== History ===
The United States and Great Britain were pioneers in the use of arbitration to resolve their differences. It was first used in the Jay Treaty of 1795 negotiated by John Jay, and played a major role in the Alabama Claims case of 1872 whereby major tensions regarding British support for the Confederacy during the American Civil War were resolved. At the First International Conference of American States in 1890, a plan for systematic arbitration was developed, but not accepted. The Hague Peace Conference of 1899 saw the major world powers agree to a system of arbitration and the creation of the Permanent Court of Arbitration. Arbitration was widely discussed among diplomats and elites in the 1890–1914 era. The 1895 dispute between the United States and Britain over Venezuela was peacefully resolved through arbitration. Both nations realized that a mechanism was desirable to avoid possible future conflicts. The Olney-Pauncefote Treaty of 1897 was a proposed treaty between the United States and Britain in 1897 that required arbitration of major disputes. The treaty was rejected by the U.S. Senate and never went into effect.

==== Arbitration treaties of 1911–1914 ====
American President William Howard Taft (1909–1913) was a major advocate of arbitration as a major reform of the Progressive Era. In 1911, Taft and his Secretary of State Philander C. Knox negotiated major treaties with Great Britain and with France providing that differences be arbitrated. Disputes had to be submitted to the Hague Court or other tribunal. These were signed in August 1911 but had to be ratified by a two thirds vote of the Senate. Neither Taft nor Knox consulted with members of the Senate during the negotiating process. By then multiple Republicans were opposed to Taft, and the president felt that lobbying too hard for the treaties might cause their defeat. He made some speeches supporting the treaties in October, but the Senate added amendments Taft could not accept, killing the agreements.

The arbitration issue opens a window on a bitter philosophical dispute among American progressives. Some, led by Taft, looked to legal arbitration as the best alternative to warfare. Taft was a constitutional lawyer who later became Chief Justice; he had a deep understanding of the legal issues. Taft's political base was the conservative business community which largely supported peace movements before 1914. However, his mistake in this case was a failure to mobilize that base. The businessmen believed that economic rivalries were cause of war, and that extensive trade led to an interdependent world that would make war an expensive and useless anachronism.

However, an opposing faction of American progressives, led by ex-president Theodore Roosevelt, ridiculed arbitration as foolhardy idealism, and insisted on the realism of warfare as the only solution to serious disputes. Taft's treaties with France and Britain were killed by Roosevelt, who had broken with his protégé Taft in 1910. They were dueling for control of the Republican Party. Roosevelt worked with his close friend Senator Henry Cabot Lodge to impose those amendments that ruined the goals of the treaties. Lodge thought the treaties impinge too much on senatorial prerogatives. Roosevelt, however, was acting to sabotage Taft's campaign promises. At a deeper level, Roosevelt truly believed that arbitration was a naïve solution and the great issues had to be decided by warfare. The Rooseveltian approach had a near-mystical faith of the ennobling nature of war. It endorsed jingoistic nationalism as opposed to the businessmen's calculation of profit and national interest.

Although no general arbitration treaty was entered into, Taft's administration settled several disputes with Great Britain by peaceful means, often involving arbitration. These included a settlement of the boundary between Maine and New Brunswick, a long-running dispute over seal hunting in the Bering Sea that also involved Japan, and a similar disagreement regarding fishing off Newfoundland.

American Secretary of State William Jennings Bryan (1913–1915) worked energetically to promote international arbitration agreements, but his efforts were frustrated by the outbreak of World War I. Bryan negotiated 28 treaties that promised arbitration of disputes before war broke out between the signatory countries and the United States. He made several attempts to negotiate a treaty with Germany, but ultimately was never able to succeed. The agreements, known officially as "Treaties for the Advancement of Peace", set up procedures for conciliation rather than for arbitration. Arbitration treaties were negotiated after the war, but attracted much less attention than the negotiation mechanism created by the League of Nations.

=== International agreements ===
The major international instrument on arbitration law is the 1958 New York Convention on Recognition and Enforcement of Foreign Arbitral Awards, usually simply referred to as the "New York Convention". Virtually every significant commercial country is a signatory, and only a handful of countries are not parties to the New York Convention.

Some other relevant international instruments are:

- The Geneva Protocol of 1923
- The Geneva Convention of 1927 Geneva Convention on the Execution of Foreign Arbitral Awards, 1927.
- The European Convention of 1961
- The Washington Convention of 1965 (governing settlement of international investment disputes)
- The Washington Convention (ICSID) of 1966 for investment arbitration
- The UNCITRAL Model Law on International Commercial Arbitration of 1985, (revised in 2006).
- The UNCITRAL Arbitration Rules (providing a set of rules for an ad hoc arbitration)

=== International enforcement ===
It is often easier to enforce arbitration awards in a foreign country than court judgments. Under the New York Convention 1958, an award issued in a contracting state can generally be freely enforced in any other contracting state, only subject to certain, limited defenses. Only foreign arbitration awards are enforced pursuant to the New York Convention. An arbitral decision is foreign where the award was made in a state other than the state of recognition or where foreign procedural law was used. In most cases, these disputes are settled with no public record of their existence as the loser complies voluntarily, although in 2014 UNCITRAL promulgated a rule for public disclosure of investor-state disputes.

Virtually every significant commercial country in the world is a party to the Convention while relatively few countries have a comprehensive network for cross-border enforcement of judgments their courts. Additionally, the awards not limited to damages. Whereas typically only monetary judgments by national courts are enforceable in the cross-border context, it is theoretically possible (although unusual in practice) to obtain an enforceable order for specific performance in an arbitration proceeding under the New York Convention.

Article V of the New York Convention provides an exhaustive list of grounds on which enforcement can be challenged. These are generally narrowly construed to uphold the pro-enforcement bias of the Convention.

==== Government disputes ====
Certain international conventions exist in relation to the enforcement of awards against states.

- The Washington Convention 1965 relates to settlement of investment disputes between states and citizens of other countries. The Convention created the International Centre for Settlement of Investment Disputes (or ICSID). Compared to other arbitration institutions, until the early 1990s, relatively few awards had been rendered under the ICSID Convention.
- The Algiers Declaration of 1981 established the Iran-US Claims Tribunal to adjudicate claims of American corporations and individuals in relation to expropriated property during the Islamic revolution in Iran in 1979.

== Arbitral tribunal ==
The arbitrators who determine the outcome of the dispute are called the arbitral tribunal. The composition of the arbitral tribunal can vary enormously, with either a sole arbitrator sitting, two or more arbitrators, with or without a chairman or umpire, and various other combinations. In most jurisdictions, an arbitrator enjoys immunity from liability for anything done or omitted whilst acting as arbitrator unless the arbitrator acts in bad faith.

Arbitrations are usually divided into two types: ad hoc arbitrations and administered (or institutional) arbitrations.

In ad hoc arbitrations, the arbitral tribunals are appointed by the parties or by an appointing authority chosen by the parties. After the tribunal has been formed, the appointing authority will normally have no other role and the arbitration will be managed by the tribunal.

In administered arbitration, the arbitration is administered by a professional arbitration institution providing arbitration services, such as the LCIA in London, or the ICC in Paris, or the American Arbitration Association in the United States. Normally the arbitration institution also will be the appointing authority. Arbitration institutions tend to have their own rules and procedures, and may be more formal. They also tend to be more expensive, and, for procedural reasons, slower.

=== Duties of the tribunal ===
The duties of a tribunal will be determined by a combination of the provisions of the arbitration agreement and by the procedural laws which apply in the seat of the arbitration. The extent to which the laws of the seat of the arbitration permit "party autonomy" (the ability of the parties to set out their own procedures and regulations) determines the interplay between the two.

However, in almost all countries the tribunal owes several non-derogable duties. These will normally be:

- to act fairly and impartially between the parties, and to allow each party a reasonable opportunity to put their case and to deal with the case of their opponent (sometimes shortened to: complying with the rules of "natural justice"); and
- to adopt procedures suitable to the circumstances of the particular case, so as to provide a fair means for resolution of the dispute.

== Arbitral awards ==
The definition of Arbitral Award given in sec 2(1)(c) is clearly not exhaustive. It merely points out that an Arbitral Award includes both a final award and an interim award. Although arbitration awards are characteristically an award of damages against a party, in a number of jurisdictions tribunals have a range of remedies that can form a part of the award. These may include:

1. payment of a sum of money (conventional damages)
2. the making of a "declaration" as to any matter to be determined in the proceedings
3. in some jurisdictions, the tribunal may have the same power as a court to:
  1. order a party to do or refrain from doing something ("injunctive relief")
  2. to order specific performance of a contract
  3. to order the rectification, setting aside or cancellation of a deed or other document.
4. In other jurisdictions, however, unless the parties have expressly granted the arbitrators the right to decide such matters, the tribunal's powers may be limited to deciding whether a party is entitled to damages. It may not have the legal authority to order injunctive relief, issue a declaration, or rectify a contract, such powers being reserved to the exclusive jurisdiction of the courts.

=== Challenge ===
Generally speaking, by their nature, arbitration proceedings tend not to be subject to appeal, in the ordinary sense of the word. However, in most countries, the court maintains a supervisory role to set aside awards in extreme cases, such as fraud or in the case of some serious legal irregularity on the part of the tribunal. Only domestic arbitral awards are subject to set aside procedure.

In American arbitration law there exists a small but significant body of case law which deals with the power of the courts to intervene where the decision of an arbitrator is in fundamental disaccord with the applicable principles of law or the contract. However, this body of case law has been called into question by recent decisions of the Supreme Court.

Unfortunately, there is little agreement amongst the different American judgments and textbooks as to whether such a separate doctrine exists at all, or the circumstances in which it would apply. There does not appear to be any recorded judicial decision in which it has been applied. However, conceptually, to the extent it exists, the doctrine would be an important derogation from the general principle that awards are not subject to review by the courts.

=== Costs ===
The overall costs of arbitration can be estimated on the websites of international arbitration institutions, such as that of the ICC, the website of the SIAC and the website of the International Arbitration Attorney Network. The overall cost of administrative and arbitrator fees is, on average, less than 20% of the total cost of international arbitration.

In multiple legal systems – both common law and civil law – it is normal practice for the courts to award legal costs against a losing party, with the winner becoming entitled to recover an approximation of what it spent in pursuing its claim (or in defense of a claim). The United States is a notable exception to this rule, as except for certain extreme cases, a prevailing party in a US legal proceeding does not become entitled to recoup its legal fees from the losing party.

Like the courts, arbitral tribunals generally have the same power to award costs in relation to the determination of the dispute. In international arbitration as well as domestic arbitrations governed by the laws of countries in which courts may award costs against a losing party, the arbitral tribunal will also determine the portion of the arbitrators' fees that the losing party is required to bear.

== Nomenclature ==
As methods of dispute resolution, arbitration procedure can be varied to suit the needs of the parties. Certain specific "types" of arbitration procedure have developed, particularly in North America.

- Judicial Arbitration is, usually, not arbitration at all, but merely a court process which refers to itself as arbitration, such as small claims arbitration before the County Courts in the United Kingdom.
- Online Arbitration is a form of arbitration that occurs exclusively online. There is currently an assumption that online arbitration is admissible under the New York Convention and the E-Commerce Directive, but this has not been legally verified. Since arbitration is based on a contractual agreement between the parties, an online process without a regulatory framework may generate a significant number of challenges from consumers and other weaker parties if due process cannot be assured.
- High-Low Arbitration, or Bracketed Arbitration, is an arbitration wherein the parties to the dispute agree in advance the limits within which the arbitral tribunal must render its award. It is only generally useful where liability is not in dispute, and the only issue between the parties is the amount of compensation. If the award is lower than the agreed minimum, then the defendant only need to pay the lower limit; if the award is higher than the agreed maximum, the claimant will receive the upper limit. If the award falls within the agreed range, then the parties are bound by the actual award amount. Practice varies as to whether the figures may or may not be revealed to the tribunal, or whether the tribunal is even advised of the parties' agreement.
- Binding Arbitration is a form of arbitration where the decision by the arbitrator is legally binding and enforceable, similar to a court order.
- Non-Binding Arbitration is a process which is conducted as if it were a conventional arbitration, except that the award issued by the tribunal is not binding on the parties, and they retain their rights to bring a claim before the courts or other arbitration tribunal; the award is in the form of an independent assessment of the merits of the case, designated to facilitate an out-of-court settlement. State law may automatically make a non-binding arbitration binding, if, for example, the non-binding arbitration is court-ordered, and no party requests a trial de novo (as if the arbitration had not been held).
- Pendulum Arbitration refers to a determination in industrial disputes where an arbitrator has to resolve a claim between a trade union and management by making a determination of which of the two sides has the more reasonable position. The arbitrator must choose only between the two options, and cannot split the difference or select an alternative position. It was initiated in Chile in 1979. This form of arbitration has been increasingly seen in resolving international tax disputes, especially in the context of deciding on the Transfer Pricing margins. This form of arbitration is also known (particularly in the United States) as Baseball Arbitration. It takes its name from a practice which arose in relation to salary arbitration in Major League Baseball.
- Night Baseball Arbitration is a variation of baseball arbitration where the figures are not revealed to the arbitration tribunal. The arbitrator will determinate the quantum of the claim in the usual way, and the parties agree to accept and be bound by the figure which is closest to the tribunal's award.

Such forms of "Last Offer Arbitration" can also be combined with mediation to create MEDALOA hybrid processes (Mediation followed by Last Offer Arbitration).

== History ==
=== England ===
Arbitration in its common law form developed in England; in the Middle Ages, tribunals such as the courts of the boroughs, of the fair and of the staple arose as the royal courts were not designed for trade disputes, and trade with foreigners was otherwise unenforceable. In the mid-16th century, common law courts developed contract law and the Admiralty court became accessible for disputes with foreign merchants, broadening the venues for trade disputes. Courts became suspicious of arbitration; for example, in Kill v. Hollister (1746), an English court ruled that the arbitration agreement could 'oust' courts of law and equity of jurisdiction. Merchants, however, retained provisions to settle disputes among themselves, but tension between the arbitration proceedings and courts eventually resulted in the Common Law Procedure Act 1854 (17 & 18 Vict. c. 125) which provided for the appointment of arbitrators and umpires, allowed courts to 'stay proceedings' when a disputant filed a suit despite an agreement to arbitrate, and provided a process for arbitrators to submit questions to a court. Later, the Arbitration Act 1889 (52 & 53 Vict. c. 49) was passed, followed by other Arbitration Acts in 1950, 1975, 1979 and the Arbitration Act 1996 (c. 23). The Arbitration Act 1979 (c. 42) in particular limited judicial review for arbitration awards.

=== United States ===
Arbitration was common in the early United States, with George Washington serving as an arbiter on an occasion. The United States had a notable difference from England, however, in that unlike England, its courts generally did not enforce executory agreements (binding predispute agreements) to arbitrate. This meant that prior to an award, a claimant could sue in court even if they had contractually agreed to settle disputes by arbitration. After the award, courts reviewed the judgment, but generally deferred to the arbitration, although the practice was not consistent.

The lack of enforcement of predispute agreements led to the Federal Arbitration Act of 1925, with New York leading with a state law enforcing predispute agreements. In 1921, the American Bar Association drafted the Federal Arbitration Act based on the New York law, which was passed in 1925 with minor changes. In the next decade, the American Arbitration Association promoted rules and facilitated arbitrations through appointments.

In the 21st century, arbitration has been frequently given negative media coverage, especially during and after the Me Too movement and the US Supreme Court case Epic Systems Corp. v. Lewis. In response, Democratic U.S. Representative Hank Johnson introduced the Forced Arbitration Injustice Repeal Act (FAIR Act) into the 116th United States Congress, which was cosponsored by Republican Representative Matt Gaetz and 220 other Democrats. The FAIR Act passed the House in the 116th Congress but did not pass the Senate; Both Johnson and Democratic Senator Richard Blumenthal reintroduced the act in the 117th United States Congress. In addition, Americans have also increasingly participated in "mass arbitration", a practice where consumers facing similar issues normally barred from participating in a class action lawsuit file multiple arbitration demands at once in an attempt to overwhelm a company's legal team. This has resulted in Amazon removing arbitration provisions from its terms of service, and mass arbitration has additionally hit Chipotle Mexican Grill, Uber, Lyft, Intuit, Facebook, and JPMorgan Chase.

== See also ==
- Adjudication
- Alternative dispute resolution
- American Arbitration Association
- Arbitral tribunal
- Arbitration award
- Arbitration in the United States
- Arbitration Roundtable of Toronto
- Expert determination
- International arbitration
- Mandatory arbitration
- National Academy of Arbitrators
- National Arbitration Forum
- Society of Construction Arbitrators
- UNCITRAL Model Law on International Commercial Arbitration
- Ukrainian Arbitration Association
- Uppsala Conflict Data Program
- Lawyer-supported mediation
