= London Court of International Arbitration =

British private company limited by guarantee

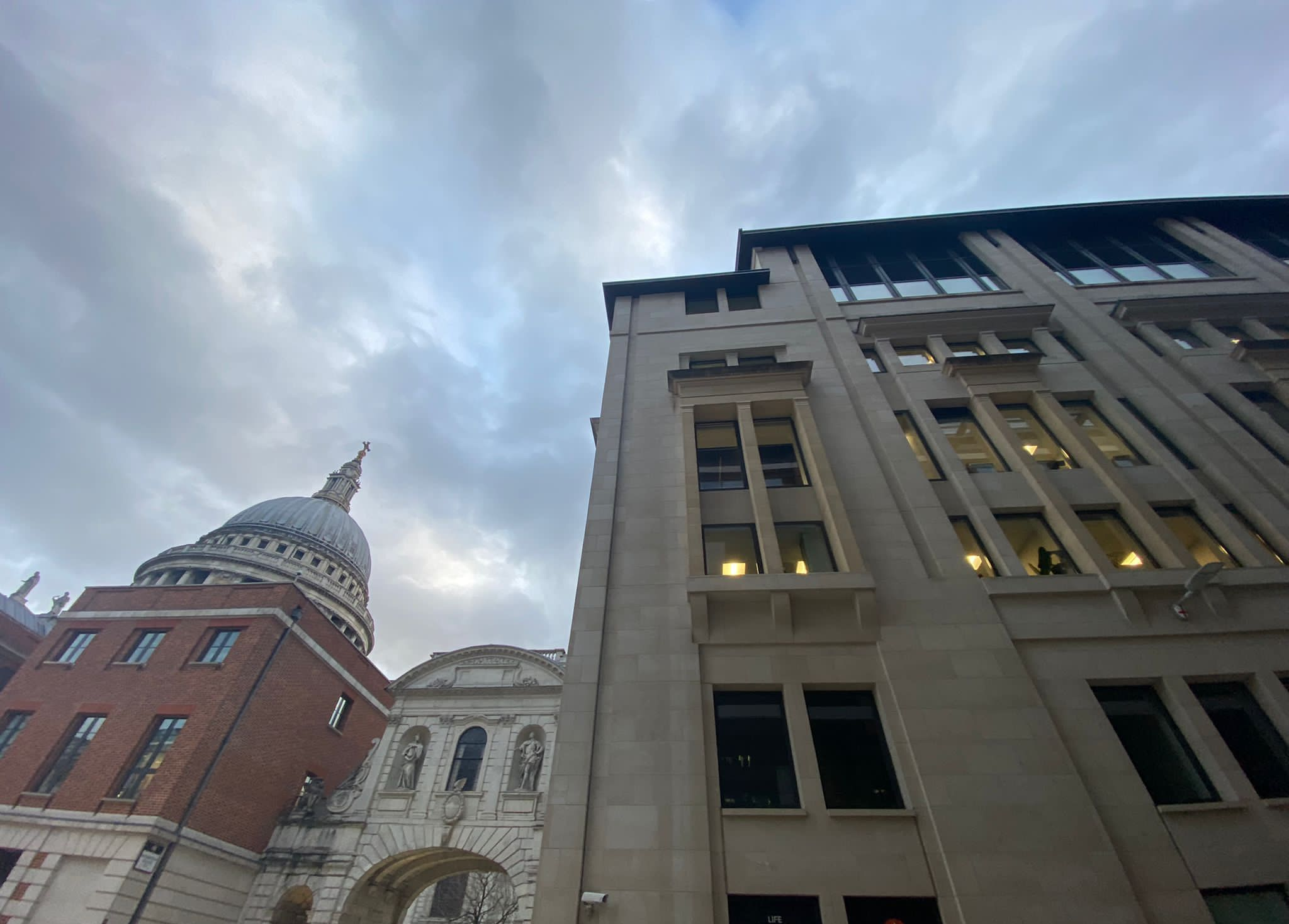
- Abbreviation: LCIA
- Formation: 1892
- Type: private company limited by guarantee
- Legal status: company number 02047647
- Purpose: arbitration
- Headquarters: 1 Paternoster Lane, London
- Website: lcia.org
- Formerly called: City of London Chamber of Arbitration; London Court of Arbitration

The London Court of International Arbitration (LCIA) is the oldest arbitral body in the world dealing with international disputes. It was founded as a British private company limited by guarantee with a head office in London. It offers dispute resolution through arbitration and mediation.

== History ==
The City of London Chamber of Arbitration was established in 1892, not long after the Arbitration Act 1889 became law. It consisted of members of the City of London Corporation and the London Chamber of Commerce & Industry, and had its seat at the Guildhall in London. The Law Quarterly Review said of it at the time: "it is to be expeditious where the law is slow."

The name was changed to "London Court of Arbitration" in 1903, and to the present name in 1981. It was incorporated as a private company limited by guarantee in 1986.
