= UNCITRAL Model Law on International Commercial Arbitration =

Arbitration law for international commerce

The UNCITRAL Model Law on International Commercial Arbitration is a model law prepared and adopted by the United Nations Commission on International Trade Law (UNCITRAL) on 21 June 1985. In 2006, it was amended and now includes more detailed provisions on interim measures.

The model law is not binding, but individual states may adopt the model law by incorporating it into their domestic law (as, for example, Australia did, in the International Arbitration Act 1974, as amended).

The model law was published in English and in French. Translations in all six United Nations languages now exist.

Note that there is a difference between the UNCITRAL Model Law on International Commercial Arbitration (1985) and the UNCITRAL Arbitration Rules. On its website, UNCITRAL explains the difference as follows: "The UNCITRAL Model Law provides a pattern that law-makers in national governments can adopt as part of their domestic legislation on arbitration. The UNCITRAL Arbitration Rules, on the other hand, are selected by parties either as part of their contract, or after a dispute arises, to govern the conduct of an arbitration intended to resolve a dispute or disputes between themselves. Put simply, the Model Law is directed at States, while the Arbitration Rules are directed at potential (or actual) parties to a dispute."
