= Consumer arbitration =

Dispute resolution process between consumers and businesses

Disputes between consumers and businesses that are arbitrated are resolved by an independent neutral arbitrator rather than in court. Although parties can agree to arbitrate a particular dispute after it arises or may agree that the award is non-binding, most consumer arbitrations occur pursuant to a pre-dispute arbitration clause where the arbitrator's award is binding.

In the United States, there is an ongoing debate over the use of arbitration clauses in consumer contracts. Differences between arbitration and litigation include the costs of resolving a case, the speed of resolution, and the procedure of resolving a case, including how and where the arbitration is conducted and the availability of discovery. Critics of consumer arbitration say that arbitrators and arbitration administrators can be biased (in part due to the repeat-player effect), arbitration clauses are not conspicuous, and for many classes of consumer goods and services, nearly all providers require arbitration. Proponents of consumer arbitration cite "consumer-friendly" terms that lower the dispute resolution costs of consumers and provide incentives for consumers to bring claims in arbitration. Most arbitration clauses require parties to waive their right to proceed on a class action basis in either court or arbitration, (Note: Although parties may agree to class arbitration, most consumer arbitration clauses expressly forbid class arbitration (see the "Class action waivers" section of this article). Justice Scalia wrote in Concepcion that because the rights of absent class members are affected by a class arbitration, class arbitrations must be more formal, which entails further delay and expense, and the very limited review of arbitration awards makes class arbitration exceedingly risky and undesirable.) and, in the United States, the debate over consumer arbitration has also featured discussion of the merits of class actions.

In 2011, the Supreme Court of the United States ruled in AT&T Mobility v. Concepcion that state laws that in effect require the availability of class actions to resolve consumer disputes are preempted by the Federal Arbitration Act. The ruling resulted in the adoption of new arbitration clauses or changes to existing ones in consumer contracts, as well as renewed efforts to persuade the federal government to regulate or ban the usage of consumer arbitration clauses.

The support given to consumer arbitration under United States law (particularly the Federal Arbitration Act) has been compared to other countries, whose laws restrict or ban consumer arbitration.

== Background ==
In arbitration, a claimant submits a claim to a neutral arbitrator, and the opposing party (the respondent) responds to the claim. A neutral arbitrator collects evidence and hears arguments from both parties, and then issues an award. Pre-hearing conferences determine procedural matters for the arbitration hearing (such as whether the arbitration is to be confidential). Hearings, which can be held in a conference center or at an office, involve the parties presenting opening statements, evidence such as documents and tangible objects, and witnesses who testify and are cross-examined. Closing arguments may be presented at the hearing, or submitted afterwards in the form of a post-hearing brief. The arbitrator's award consists of a written decision, which may simply consist of a statement of the relief awarded to each party, or it may include a written explanation. Appeal of an arbitration decision is very limited; under the Federal Arbitration Act, an awarded may be vacated only if one of the following conditions is satisfied:

- "the award was procured by corruption, fraud, or undue means"
- "there was evident partiality or corruption in the arbitrators, or either of them"
- "the arbitrators were guilty of misconduct in refusing to postpone the hearing, upon sufficient cause shown, or in refusing to hear evidence pertinent and material to the controversy; or of any other misbehavior by which the rights of any party have been prejudiced"
- "the arbitrators exceeded their powers, or so imperfectly executed them that a mutual, final, and definite award upon the subject matter submitted was not made"

== History ==
=== The FAA and the Supreme Court's "liberal federal policy favoring arbitration" ===
Congress passed the Federal Arbitration Act (FAA) in 1925 to require courts to enforce valid arbitration agreements. Before then, courts routinely refused to enforce arbitration agreements, making such clauses ineffective.

According to §2 of the FAA (codified at 9 U.S.C. §2):

A written provision in any maritime transaction or a contract evidencing a transaction involving commerce to settle by arbitration a controversy thereafter arising out of such contract or transaction, or the refusal to perform the whole or any part thereof, or an agreement in writing to submit to arbitration an existing controversy arising out of such a contract, transaction, or refusal, shall be valid, irrevocable, and enforceable, save upon such grounds as exist at law or in equity for the revocation of any contract.

In the 1970s, due to growing court dockets, courts enforced arbitration agreements more often. In the 1983 case Moses H. Cone Mem'l Hosp. v. Mercury Constr. Co., the Supreme Court stated that by enacting §2 of the FAA, Congress made a "declaration of a liberal federal policy favoring arbitration agreements". Later decisions by the Supreme Court in the 1990s established that the FAA preempts state laws regulating arbitration agreements and that statutory claims may be arbitrated pursuant to an arbitration agreement.

=== First consumer arbitration clauses ===
In a 1996 article in the Franchise Law Journal, Edward Wood Dunham described "The Arbitration Clause as Class Action Shield." Dunham suggested that franchisors should add arbitration clauses to their franchise agreements to minimize exposure to class actions and large jury awards. In the late 1990s, the National Arbitration Forum advertised its services to corporate lawyers, suggesting that the only way for companies to avoid being liable in a class action lawsuit was to insert arbitration clauses with class action waivers into their contracts. The Ross v. Bank of America class action alleged that major credit card companies illegally colluded during the late 1990s to support enforcement of arbitration clauses via amicus curiae briefs and to include materially identical arbitration clauses in their cardholder agreements. In August 1999, Consumer Reports wrote that over the previous three years, the number of consumer arbitration clauses has "increased manyfold", according to the National Arbitration Forum.

According to Ramona L. Lampley, the first generation of consumer arbitration clauses was characterized by drafters including not only class action waivers but also damages limitations, bars on recovery of attorney fees, requirements that consumers pay half or all of the arbitration fees, confidentiality requirements on the parties to an arbitration, or allowing the business to unilaterally select the arbitrator, all of which were found unenforceable by some court. In August 1999, Consumer Reports cited a then-superseded arbitration clause by Gateway where a consumer would have to pay $2,000 to file a claim, would have to mail the claim to a Paris address, and would have to travel to Chicago for arbitration hearings. However, in 2001, Christopher R. Drahozal wrote that "unfair arbitration clauses" are less prevalent than thought, and that even unfair terms could be beneficial to the contracting parties. In 2001, Stephen Ware suggested that requiring consumer protections in arbitration (requiring the availability of class proceedings, applying a universal cap on consumer fees without a case-by-case determination of whether the consumer can afford those fees, "requiring substantial discovery", or requiring businesses and consumers to arbitrate the same types of claims) would increase the costs of dispute resolution for the business, which would raise prices.

In 2002, Julia A. Scarpino wrote that "many consumer contracts ... contain an arbitration clause" but consumers are generally unaware of the existence of arbitration clauses.

=== Unconscionability as a defense ===
Unconscionability is a defense to the enforcement of a contract. Most jurisdictions in the United States determine unconscionability based on two prongs: procedural unconscionability and substantive unconscionability. Procedural unconscionability arises from "contract formation" issues such as inconspicuous terms or terms offered on a "take-it-or-leave-it basis", while substantive unconscionability arises from "overly-harsh" or "one-sided" terms.

In 1998, Richard E. Speidel discussed the possibility the unconscionability could be a defense to the enforcement of a consumer arbitration agreement, but he concluded that such a defense would be unlikely to succeed (even in a standard form contract) when the arbitration clause is not hidden or there are competitors that offer similar products or services without requiring arbitration. Alan Kaplinsky and Mark Levin wrote in a May 1999 article that "relatively few consumer arbitration provisions have actually been struck down by courts as 'unfair' or 'unconscionable'". Charles L. Knapp, in a 2009 article, noted that Speidel only cited one case where an arbitration clause was unconscionable, and, in that case, it was based on what the Court described as "unique facts". Aaron-Andrew P. Bruhl wrote that courts are not allowed to refuse to enforce an arbitration clause because of the nature of arbitration, but courts have considered whether specific arbitration terms are unconscionable. Knapp wrote that since Speidel's 1998 paper, more cases have arisen where a party successfully asserted unconscionability as a defense to the enforcement of an arbitration agreement. According to Bruhl, unconscionability was an issue in about 15 to 20 percent of cases in the mid 2000s, up from 1 percent a decade earlier. Bruhl posited that the rise in unconscionability defenses may have arisen from the Supreme Court's arbitration jurisprudence striking down other defenses to the enforcement of arbitration agreements. Bruhl wrote that some unconscionability challenges to arbitration terms (such as punitive damages limitations) do not fit in the mold of classical unconscionability cases. According to Bruhl, scholars have seen the unconscionability doctrine as a check against the Supreme Court's pro-arbitration jurisprudence. Bruhl suggested that courts opposing arbitration turned to fact-specific unconscionability inquiries as opposed to categorical rules to make their decisions more likely to stand after appeal. Overall, Bruhl concluded that "[u]nconscionability might operate as a sort of safety valve that makes arbitration politically sustainable" since courts can use unconscionability to strike egregiously unfair terms, while the threat that an arbitration provision may be found unconscionable can encourage businesses not to include unfair arbitration terms.

Proponents of consumer arbitration have cited courts' usage of the unconscionability doctrine to say that current arbitration law sufficiently protects consumers from unfair terms. Andrew Pincus, who argued on behalf of AT&T Mobility in Concepcion, described the continued existence of the defense of unconscionability as preventing an "anything goes" approach to the enforcement of arbitration clauses. Rutledge and Drahozal wrote that the savings clause of §2 of the FAA may be sufficient to prevent the application of unfair arbitration terms, which may make specific legislation banning those terms unnecessary. Arpan A. Sura and Robert A. DeRise wrote that, after Concepcion, an argument could be made that courts would be required to enforce egregiously unfair arbitration terms such as those found in Hooters of America, Inc. v. Phillips.

=== AT&T Mobility v. Concepcion ===
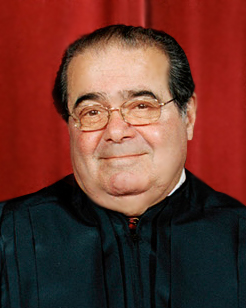
United States Supreme Court Justice Antonin Scalia wrote the majority opinion in AT&T Mobility v. Concepcion

In March 2006, Vincent and Liza Concepcion filed a putative class action in the United States District Court for the Southern District of California, alleging that AT&T improperly advertised its phones as free when purchasers had to pay sales tax on them. In March 2008, AT&T moved to compel individual arbitration on the basis of its agreement with the Concepcions. The District Court denied AT&T's motion, stating that although AT&T's arbitration provision was likely to grant the Concepcions at least full relief, it was unconscionable and could not be enforced "because AT&T had not shown that bilateral arbitration adequately substituted for the deterrent effects of class actions". The District Court relied on the California Supreme Court's holding in Discover Bank v. Superior Court (2005), which held that arbitration agreements prohibiting class actions were exculpatory and unconscionable when they appear as part of an adhesion contract where an individual consumer's damages would be "predictably small" and the consumer has alleged a scheme where the business has "deliberately cheat[ed] large numbers of consumers out of individually small sums of money". California courts regularly refused enforcement of class action waivers in arbitration prior to Concepcion. The Ninth Circuit affirmed, holding that Discover Bank is not preempted by the FAA and class arbitration did not interfere with "the efficiency and expeditiousness of arbitration".

In a 5–4 decision published on April 27, 2011, the Supreme Court reversed. Justice Scalia, writing for the Court, first described how the savings clause of 9 U.S.C. §2 affects state law applied to invalidate arbitration agreements:

This saving clause permits agreements to arbitrate to be invalidated by "generally applicable contract defenses, such as fraud, duress, or unconscionability," but not by defenses that apply only to arbitration or that derive their meaning from the fact that an agreement to arbitrate is at issue.

Scalia then stated that the Federal Arbitration Act preempts not only state law that "prohibits outright the arbitration of a particular type of claim", but also "generally applicable" doctrines "applied in a fashion that disfavors arbitration". Scalia discussed particular examples, such as law requiring arbitrations to allow for judicially monitored discovery, application of the Federal Rules of Evidence, or decision by a jury. The majority opinion further discussed how "classwide arbitration interferes with fundamental attributes of arbitration and thus creates a scheme inconsistent with the FAA". The majority opinion described the Discover Bank rule as one that essentially applies to require consumers to be able to demand class arbitration to resolve all consumer disputes. Scalia focused on the result of the "Discover Bank" rule - since its application was invalidating a large number of arbitration agreements, it must violate the policy in favor of arbitration. Therefore, the majority opinion concluded that Discover Bank is preempted by the FAA.

Justice Thomas concurred. Thomas stated that only challenges to the formation of an arbitration agreement could be used to refuse to enforce arbitration clauses, and that states could not refuse enforcement of arbitration clauses on public policy grounds. Justice Breyer dissented, joined by Justices Ginsburg, Sotomayor, and Kagan. Breyer's dissent stated that Discover Bank was not inconsistent with the FAA since it applies to both arbitration and litigation, and that requiring individual arbitration would lead to individual consumers dropping their claims.

=== Developments following Concepcion ===
Following Concepcion, many businesses introduced or renewed motions to move pending lawsuits to arbitration; by April 2012, there were at least 76 decisions where a court cited Concepcion in granting a motion to compel individual arbitration of a putative class action.

The Concepcion decision also impacted the usage of arbitration clauses in consumer contracts, including the usage of "consumer-friendly" arbitration terms like the ones in AT&T's agreement. Several large businesses, such as Sony, Microsoft, and Netflix introduced arbitration provisions after Concepcion. Rutledge and Drahozal argue that empirical evidence calls into question the hypothesis of massive adoption of arbitration clauses by businesses.

== Aspects of consumer arbitration ==
Arbitration has significant differences from litigation. Additional issues pertaining specifically to the nature of consumer arbitration have been discussed. Commentators have considered all these issues and their effect on consumers' and businesses' handling of legal claims and the enforcement of laws in determining whether and under what circumstances pre-dispute consumer arbitration agreements should be enforced.

=== Arbitrators and arbitration administrators ===
Consumer arbitration clauses typically name one or more third-party arbitration administrators that may conduct a dispute. These organizations assist in the arbitration process by maintaining a roster of neutrals, managing the arbitrator selection process, and maintaining rules for arbitrations they conduct. The arbitrator is typically selected by the arbitration administrator or through the participation of both parties. (Note: Under the American Arbitration Association Supplementary Procedures for Consumer-Related Disputes, the AAA appoints the arbitrator, and each party has the right to submit "factual objections" to the arbitrator handling the case. AAA Senior Vice President Richard Naimark stated that when there is an objection to an arbitrator, the AAA attempts to find another arbitrator both sides find acceptable. Under the JAMS rules, if the parties do not agree on an arbitrator, JAMS provides the parties with the names of five arbitrators, and each party may strike up to two names and rank the remainder; of the arbitrators not struck, the one with the "highest composite ranking" is selected.)

Most credit card issuers name the American Arbitration Association (AAA) and/or JAMS as an arbitration administrator. Before the National Arbitration Forum ceased administering new consumer arbitrations in 2009, many credit card issuers also included it. A 2014 article in the San Francisco Chronicle stated that about 95% of consumer arbitrations in California are administered by AAA, JAMS, or "Kaiser's independent administrator", according to "a lobbyist for the California arbitration industry". AAA and JAMS primarily hear disputes between businesses and employment disputes. Consumer cases make up less than 1% of the AAA's overall caseload.

JAMS is a for-profit arbitration administrator founded in 1979, in Orange County, California. Many of the disputes JAMS administers are high-end disputes, and JAMS arbitrators, who are attorneys or retired judges, charge "hundreds of dollars per hour".

=== Impartiality of arbitrators and arbitration organizations ===
==== Business selection of arbitration administrator ====
In a consumer arbitration agreement, the business typically lists one or more third-party arbitration administrators that may conduct the arbitration. Critics of consumer arbitration say that this selection is done to select a forum that favors the business. Critics also argue (as detailed below) that businesses can place undue pressure on arbitration administrators to act in favor of the business by threatening to remove them as an allowed arbitration forum.

Jean Sternlight wrote that some businesses named arbitration administrators with neutral-sounding names that, in fact, were "alter ego[s]" of the business.

==== Business influence on arbitration administrators' policies ====
Some commentators have written that businesses removed arbitration administrators or threatened to do so in order to influence those administrators' policies.

In 2004 JAMS promulgated a policy that required the availability of class arbitration in consumer arbitration, even if the arbitration agreement barred class arbitration. Under the policy, JAMS would accept filed arbitration cases but would then refuse to enforce class action waivers. Subsequently, JAMS stated that the arbitrator would have the authority to determine whether class arbitration would be permitted. Following JAMS's adoption of this policy, several businesses, including Discover and Citibank, removed JAMS as an arbitration administrator. JAMS rescinded the policy in March 2005, which Gilles suggests was the result of influence by businesses.

==== Allegations of impropriety by administrators ====
In an August 2001 article in The Metropolitan Corporate Counsel, NAF Managing Director Edward Anderson described the NAF's rule barring arbitrators from awarding more than the stated amount of the claim as an advantage for corporations to implement arbitration, as compared to court where plaintiffs need not state an amount demanded and can persuade a jury to award a large amount of punitive damages. Anderson added that the NAF has a rule allowing the arbitrator to award the winning party its arbitration costs and attorney's fees, which he said eliminates "'no risk' arbitration" and prevents "'extortion' actions". In its 2007 article "The Arbitration Trap", Public Citizen criticized this marketing by the NAF to corporations. Stephanie Mencimer of Mother Jones criticized an advertisement by the NAF to businesses describing NAF arbitration as an "alternative to the 'million-dollar lawsuit.'" A 2008 article in BusinessWeek described confidential presentations by the NAF to corporations which stated that NAF arbitration has a "marked increase in recovery rates over existing collection methods", highlighted a rule allowing the claimant to stay or dismiss an arbitration proceeding without charge, and stated that 93.7% of consumers do not respond to arbitration demands, and only 0.3% request a participatory hearing. According to a complaint filed by Lori Swanson in 2009, one presentation by the NAF to a financial services company included a slide of quotes from unnamed customer service representatives suggesting that arbitration is more advantageous to creditors than litigation because creditors "have all the leverage" and consumers are unfamiliar with the arbitration process.

Minnesota Attorney General Lori Swanson filed a complaint on July 14, 2009 alleging that the National Arbitration Forum engaged in several deceptive practices. Swanson alleged that the NAF was partially owned by Accretive, a firm with ties to major debt collection law firms; Swanson alleged that the NAF covered up those ties while representing itself as an impartial forum. According to the complaint, Accretive and the NAF worked to promote arbitration and oppose the Arbitration Fairness Act in Congress. Swanson also alleged that the NAF improperly assisted credit card companies by drafting arbitration clauses and claims against consumers. Further, according to the complaint, the NAF also advertised its services to creditors by suggesting that arbitration is more favorable to them than litigation. On July 17, the NAF settled the Minnesota case by agreeing not to conduct any new consumer arbitrations.

=== Costs of arbitration ===
==== Arbitrator and administrative fees ====
The American Arbitration Association charges two types of fees to parties in an arbitration: administrative fees to the AAA for its case management services and arbitrator fees to pay for the services of the arbitrator. Prior to March 1, 2013, the AAA had a tiered fee structure that capped the fees charged to a consumer claiming only monetary damages of up to $75,000 and required the business to pay the remaining fees (see below). Under the pre-2013 rules, unless the parties agreed otherwise, the arbitrator had the authority to reallocate the fees in the award.

AAA fees assessed in consumer claims (before March 1, 2013)

Claim size	Fees charged to consumer	Fees charged to business
at most $10,000	$125 for arbitrator	$750 administrative fee (+$200 for a hearing) and $125 for arbitrator
more than $10,000 and at most $75,000	$375 for arbitrator	$950 administrative fee (+$300 for a hearing) and $375 for aribtrator
over $75,000	administrative fee under the Commercial Arbitration Rules and half of the arbitrator fee	administrative fee under the Commercial Arbitration Rules and half of the arbitrator fee

In 2004, Mark Budnitz criticized the exclusion of claims for injunctive relief from the caps on consumer fees, saying that the laws pertaining to injunctive relief are straightforward for an arbitrator to apply and that the added fees for requesting injunctive relief would discourage consumers who most deserve injunctive relief from seeking it. The AAA changed its consumer fee schedule effective March 1, 2013. Under the current schedule, the AAA charges consumers a maximum fee of $200 (which is used to pay the AAA administrative fee), regardless of the type or amount of the consumer's claim; the business is responsible for the arbitrator fee, the hearing fee, and an AAA administrative fee. Further, the arbitrator is not allowed to reallocate the fees unless it is done "pursuant to applicable law" or if the arbitrator finds that "a claim or counterclaim was filed for purposes of harassment or is patently frivolous".

JAMS charges the consumer $250 when the consumer initiates an arbitration, and the business is responsible for the remaining fees; businesses initiating arbitration must pay all of the arbitration fees in JAMS.

In March 2009, the Searle Civil Justice Institute published an analysis of consumer cases in AAA resulting in an award from April to December 2007. According to the analysis, consumer claimants seeking less than $10,000 paid an average of $1 in administrative fees and $95 in arbitrator fees, while consumer claimants seeking at least $10,000 but less than or equal to $75,000 paid an average of $15 in administrative fees and $204 in arbitrator fees. Consumer claimants seeking more than $75,000 paid an average of $1,448 in administrative fees and $1,256 in arbitrator fees. However, the report also says that because only awarded cases were considered, there may be a selection bias in that awarded cases are those where arbitration fees did not prevent consumers from pursuing their claims in arbitration.

The National Arbitration Forum assessed fees based on the size of the claim, according to a published fee schedule. According to the 2008 fee schedule, consumers claiming less than $75,000 were charged filing fees of $19 (for a claim of $1,500 or less) to $242 (for claims valued from $55,000 to $74,999), plus a $20 fee for each objection, a $100 fee to submit a post-hearing memorandum or a request for an explained decision, and up to $250 for a participatory hearing. For larger claims, the NAF charged higher fees, including fees for making requests to the arbitrator or the NAF. Sarah Rudolph Cole and Kristen M. Blankley said that many contracts have different arrangements for who pays the arbitration fees, so consumers often paid less than the amount listed in the NAF fee schedule. Cole and Blankley said that, in the data set of about 34,000 cases studied, there were only five cases where a consumer paid more than $500 in arbitration fees; in all of those cases, the consumer brought a claim and was represented by counsel.

==== Other arbitration expenses ====
Like in litigation, each party in an arbitration is responsible for the costs it incurs in presenting its case, such as attorneys' fees, witness fees, and discovery costs. The amount of these costs has been compared between arbitration and litigation in two manners.

These costs tend to be lower for individual arbitration as compared to individual litigation. Because discovery is traditionally more limited in arbitration, discovery expenses (which make up the bulk of litigation expenses) tend to be lower in arbitration. Depending on the specific terms of the arbitration clause, a consumer plaintiff may be entitled to recover attorney's fees and/or expert witness fees that are not otherwise available in court. However, the increase in the prevalence of litigation-style discovery and the tendency for summary judgment and other dispositive motions to be unavailable or denied in arbitration may increase these costs such that they are no longer cheaper in arbitration than in litigation. To reinforce the viability of the consumer arbitration system, many companies commit to reimburse the cost of filing an arbitration even for consumers who do not ultimately win further compensation.

When individual arbitration is compared to a class action in litigation, though, these costs may be more disproportionate to the individual amount of relief to which an individual is entitled. In the antitrust case American Express Co. v. Italian Colors Restaurant, the plaintiffs, who were small businesses who agreed to accept American Express cards, estimated that they would have to spend $300,000 to $1 million for an economic expert necessary to present their case, which far exceeded the damages an individual plaintiff could recover.

==== Scholarly opinion ====
Commentators have criticized reliance on arbitration fees to suggest unfairness towards the consumer. Edward A. Dauer said that the lowered costs of arbitration as compared to litigation may be more beneficial to businesses who tend to hire counsel at an hourly rate rather than consumers whose legal representation is subject to contingent fee agreements. Christopher R. Drahozal said that upfront arbitration costs should not affect the ability for consumers represented by lawyers on a contingent fee basis to bring claims in arbitration. Stephen Ware said that it is erroneous to only compare arbitration forum fees with court fees because, he says, the entire cost of pursuing a claim in arbitration will likely be lower than the entire cost of pursuing a claim in litigation. Peter Rutledge criticized making a distinction between attorney's fees and arbitration fees, saying that, overall, they both represent out-of-pocket expenses for a consumer.

=== Speed of resolution ===
Arbitration is generally faster than litigation, in part due to the limited amount of discovery available in arbitration, the reduced motion practice in arbitration, and the backlog of court cases that delays judicial resolution of cases.

According to a 2009 paper by the Searle Civil Justice Institute, in a sample of 301 cases by the American Arbitration Association that resulted in an award in 2007, the median length of time from the filing of a case to an award was 207 days. Only seven of those cases took more than one and a half years to resolve. Cases resolved on the basis of document submissions only were resolved in an average (mean) of 139 days.

In a 2012 article, Miles B. Farmer wrote that one of the greatest advantages of arbitration is that cases are resolved faster than in litigation. George Padis wrote that the speed of arbitration benefits consumer claimants with small claims, who would be forced to settle for smaller amounts if the business were able to engage in delaying tactics in litigation.

=== Legal representation ===
According to a 2009 report by the Searle Civil Justice Institute, in a sample of 301 consumer cases where the AAA issued an award from April to December 2007, consumers were represented by counsel in 151 cases (50.2%). In arbitration, consumers represented by counsel generally won some relief and won a higher average amount than consumers appearing pro se. According to the Searle Civil Justice Institute, this difference could be either due to the enhanced advocacy of an attorney or due to attorneys screening cases for ones that are likely to succeed. According to the preliminary results of the Consumer Financial Protection Bureau's arbitration study, which examined consumer financial services cases from 2010 through 2012 filed with the American Arbitration Association, in the 522 debt collection cases studied, consumers were represented in 220 cases (42.1%) and businesses were represented in 518 cases (99.2%). In the 719 non-debt collection cases, consumers were represented in 435 cases (60.5%) and businesses were represented in 637 cases (88.6%). The CFPB stated that the high proportion of cases where a business is represented by an attorney may be due to state laws regarding the unauthorized practice of law, which prohibit corporations from self-representing in arbitration. Jean Sternlight wrote that in mandatory arbitration, one side may be represented while the other side is not, which may pressure both parties to retain an attorney to avoid the situation where only the opposing party is represented. Kristen M. Blankley described the possibility that businesses could subsidize counsel for a consumer party who would otherwise proceed without representation.

Matt Webb, Senior Vice President of the United States Chamber of Commerce's Institute for Legal Reform, stated that a fair arbitration clause could allow consumers to effectively pursue small claims without attorney representation. Jason Scott Johnston and Todd Zywicki described consumer arbitration as "a process set up so that hiring an attorney offers little value to a consumer and is often unnecessary" and said that the CFPB's arbitration study's results were consistent with this hypothesis. Travis Crabtree said unrepresented consumers are "less likely to be tripped up in a procedural trap" in arbitration than in litigation. Michael Satz, though, wrote that the rules of procedure established by arbitration administrators are not likely to be understood by nonlawyers. Stephan Landsman wrote that, under the Model Rules of Professional Conduct, arbitrators are prohibited from assisting unrepresented parties in arbitration, in contrast to judges who are allowed and encouraged to assist unrepresented parties in court. Jean Sternlight said that consumers cannot effectively present what she termed "procedurally difficult" claims in individual arbitration Aaron Blumenthal wrote that, since simpler claims are likely to be resolved by customer service, claims brought in arbitration are more likely to be procedurally difficult claims requiring an attorney to present.

=== Class action waivers ===
Most consumer arbitration agreements contain clauses that disallow arbitration on a classwide basis. These clauses, which have the effect of preventing parties from seeking relief on a classwide basis in either court or arbitration, are commonly referred to as "class action waivers".

Theodore Eisenberg, Geoffrey P. Miller, and Emily Sherwin said that none of the contracts they researched had standalone waivers of class actions without arbitration clauses because, outside of arbitration clauses, class action waivers "are legally vulnerable and also politically controversial".

In 2004, Demaine and Hensler wrote that 16 of 52 arbitration clauses examined contained class action waivers, and none expressly permitted class arbitration. Ballard Spahr attorneys Alan Kaplinsky and Mark Levin wrote in a 2006 article that "[o]nce rare, class action waivers are today included in millions of credit card and other financial services agreements nationwide". According to the preliminary results of the CFPB's arbitration study, released in 2013, 93.9% of unique credit card contracts that contained arbitration clauses, representing 99.9% of the credit card market where contracts contain arbitration clauses, had explicit class action waivers.

Commentators have viewed the ability to prevent consumers from obtaining relief on a classwide basis as a principal reason for businesses to add arbitration provisions to their consumer contracts. Lisa Renee Pomerantz wrote that there was speculation that large businesses would abandon arbitration if pre-dispute class action waivers could not be enforced because they believe arbitration is "more readily accessible to and provid[es] greater protections to consumers". Jeff Sovern said that the financial industry's argument that the CFPB's proposed ban on class action waivers would lead to the industry abandoning arbitration suggested that its "love of arbitration is about barring class actions". F. Paul Bland and Claire Prestel wrote that, for businesses, a class action waiver is "the most valuable provision in an arbitration clause". Nancy Welsh described the Supreme Court's arbitration jurisprudence as giving businesses the benefit of blocking class actions as an incentive to "provide and fund a national private small claims court". In a 2013 article giving advice to businesses on drafting arbitration clauses, Nicole F. Munro and Peter L. Cockrell wrote, "The class action waiver is the focal point of any arbitration clause. Without a class action waiver, one need not engage in arbitration." Rutledge and Drahozal wrote that although nearly all credit card contracts contain class action waivers, very few contain other provisions identified as unfair to the consumer, which they concluded is due to businesses wanting to avoid a ruling that the class action waiver, together with those other unfair provisions, is unenforceable. Jean Sternlight said that if an arbitration clause contains a class action waiver, any other terms are irrelevant, as no consumers will actually pursue individual arbitration.

=== Availability of relief otherwise available in court ===
In 2004, Linda J. Demaine and Deborah R. Hensler wrote that "[t]he vast majority of [consumer arbitration] clauses place no limits on substantive remedies."

=== Location and venue ===
The location of consumer arbitration proceedings (including whether they are conducted without the appearance of the parties or their attorneys) can be set by the arbitration organization's rules or by terms in the arbitration clause.

Commentators have discussed whether businesses select arbitration locations that are inconvenient for consumers to discourage consumer claims. Jean Sternlight wrote that consumer arbitration could be held in locations inconvenient for the consumer that would contravene state law, citing the Ninth Circuit case Bradley v. Harris Research (2001), which held that a California law setting venue in California for franchise disputes involving California franchisees was preempted as applied to arbitration clauses requiring venue elsewhere.

Philippe Gillieron wrote that online dispute resolution (ODR) could facilitate the pursuit of small claims for transactions conducted on the Internet; the alternative would be to obtain a court judgment in a foreign country or have a judgment enforced there. Amy Schmitz proposed online arbitration as a means for consumers to obtain relief for claims pertaining to online transactions, saying that online arbitration is superior than other online dispute resolution methods since both parties are required to participate in the process. Schmitz added that conducting arbitration online may free consumers from having to travel a great distance to pursue arbitration or litigation. Peter Rutledge wrote that one advantage for consumer defendants in arbitration is that they do not have to make a personal appearance, in contrast with small claims court. Jill Gross wrote that simplified arbitration procedures that resolve small claims on the basis of written submissions are inadequate for pro se parties who may not be able to effectively make written legal arguments, citing the Supreme Court case Goldberg v. Kelly (1970), which held that requiring welfare recipients to make written arguments was insufficient due process under the Fourteenth Amendment to the United States Constitution. Gross added that arbitrations based solely on written submissions favor businesses who have greater access to documents and make it difficult for the arbitrator to resolve disputed facts based solely on affidavits. Gross stated that requiring a business representative to make a personal appearance increases the likelihood of settlement, and that allowing consumers to present their arguments in-person to an arbitrator provides them greater confidence in the legitimacy of the arbitration.

According to the CFPB arbitration study, in the 86 cases it studied in which in-person arbitration hearings were held, the hearings were an average of 30 miles from the consumer's residence. Lisa Renee Pomerantz wrote that non-arbitration forum selection clauses frequently require litigation against the business to be brought in the jurisdiction where the business is located.

=== "Consumer-friendly" arbitration terms ===
In response to court decisions ruling arbitration agreements unconscionable, some businesses began adding "consumer-friendly" provisions to their arbitration clauses. For example, after court decisions striking down their arbitration clauses, PayPal and Second Life changed their terms to allow the claimant to choose optional non-appearance-based arbitration for small claims or to go to court under the terms of a forum selection clause. (Note: For PayPal, the required court venue was Santa Clara County, California or Omaha, Nebraska; for Second Life, San Francisco, California.) According to David Horton, following court decisions striking class action waivers, some businesses unilaterally added "elaborate schemes" that would provide an incentive for consumers to bring low-value claims in arbitration, such as paying all arbitration costs and automatically awarding successful plaintiffs attorney's fees. Horton wrote that such provisions were designed primarily to convince courts that arbitration provisions were not unconscionable, rather than to attract customers from competitors on the basis of such arbitration terms. Horton also suggested, though, that decisions upholding a class action waiver would cause businesses to remove consumer-friendly clauses to reduce the incentive for consumers to bring claims. Myriam Gilles said that businesses' usage of consumer-friendly arbitration provisions could avoid outright bans on consumer arbitration by the federal government.

To avoid a ruling of procedural unconscionability, some businesses began allowing consumers to reject ("opt out" of) arbitration agreements at the time of entering into a contract without penalty. F. Paul Bland and Claire Prestel wrote that more consumers will fail to exercise an opt-out option (which may be inconspicuously placed in a contract and difficult to understand) than would affirmatively agree to arbitrate, citing consumer optimism that disputes will not arise and transaction costs. They added that having an opt-out option would only affect procedural unconscionability and would not apply to other defenses, nor would it prevent a ruling of unconscionability in jurisdictions where substantive unconscionability alone can make a contract term unenforceable. Deepak Gupta, who argued on behalf of the consumer respondents in Concepcion, said that those opt-out provisions are illusory since consumers would not likely opt out before a dispute arises. Plaintiffs and lawyers attributed the lack of opt-outs to consumers not being aware of the existence of the arbitration clause or not understanding the ramifications of not opting out. Charles Gibbs wrote that consumers who opt out would only be able to join in a class action with other consumers who also opted out, and therefore such a class action would have less of a deterrent effect against the business.

AT&T Mobility (formerly known as Cingular Wireless) made numerous changes to its arbitration clause during the 2000s. The Cingular Wireless agreement at issue in the 2006 Illinois Supreme Court case Kinkel v. Cingular Wireless imposed a confidentiality requirement on the parties, generally barred punitive damages awards, and required payment of a $125 fee to arbitrate a claim of $150. AT&T Mobility removed those provisions and ultimately developed, in consultation with Vanderbilt University Law School professor Richard A. Nagareda, a new arbitration clause similar to the one in Concepcion.

Justice Scalia identified the following provisions in the AT&T Mobility agreement that was before the Supreme Court in Concepcion:

- the forms to begin the arbitration process were short and available on AT&T's web site;
- AT&T was required to pay all the arbitration costs, unless a claim was frivolous;
- the arbitration proceedings would take place in the county of the customer's billing address;
- the customer had the option of an in-person hearing, a telephonic hearing, or a decision based on written submissions, if the claim is under $10,000;
- the customer could pursue a claim in small claims court instead of arbitration;
- the arbitrator was not limited in the type of individual relief that could be awarded;
- AT&T agreed not to ask for reimbursement of its attorney's fees;
- if the customer recovered an award greater than AT&T's last written settlement offer before the selection of an arbitrator, the customer's award would be increased to $7,500 and the customer would be entitled to double attorney's fees.

Scalia endorsed the lower courts' analysis that, under these terms, the Concepcions were in a much better position pursuing their claim in arbitration rather than as a class action, and that they were "'essentially guarantee[d]' to be made whole". In an article in Metropolitan Corporate Counsel, Kevin B. Leblang and Robert N. Holtzman wrote that although the Supreme Court did not base the Concepcion decision on the consumer-friendly terms in AT&T's agreement, those terms were likely a factor in the Supreme Court's ruling.

Commentators, though, have criticized whether or not these terms would guarantee consumers relief. Myriam Gilles and Gary Friedman wrote that because the settlement would only be the amount of the claim, the attorney would have a difficult case in justifying a relatively large amount of attorney's fees for winning such a small settlement. The authors added that filing a complaint pro se would not alleviate this issue, as a settlement offer could be made just prior to arbitration. Gibbs wrote that AT&T's alternative payment would not have the same deterrence effect as a class action, and that it would be highly unlikely to ever occur, given that AT&T could offer the face value of the complaint if "a beneficial result in arbitration" for the consumer was possible. Gibbs also considered AT&T's agreement to pay all of the consumer's arbitration costs as an acknowledgment that few consumers would bring cases in arbitration. David Korn and David Rosenberg suggested that the alternative payment provision would have a "perverse" effect of increasing the motivation for the business to spend more for a better chance of winning at arbitration and reducing its total liability to all its customers.

=== Number of arbitrations filed by consumers ===
Commentators have cited statistics about the number of arbitrations filed by consumers in answering the question of whether consumers can effectively pursue claims in arbitration. Jean Sternlight wrote in a 2012 article that, according to JAMS Executive Vice President Jay Welsh, JAMS handles a "few hundred" consumer cases each year, most of which are preemptive arbitrations by alleged credit card debtors seeking to avoid debt collection litigation, and that AAA conducted about a thousand consumer arbitrations a year. Sternlight said that this was a very small number of arbitrations compared to the number of consumers required to arbitrate disputes. According to the preliminary results of the CFPB's arbitration study, 1,241 cases were filed with the AAA from 2010 to 2012 concerning "credit cards, checking account[s], and payday loans", compared to an estimated 80 million credit card holders subject to arbitration clauses. Of the 326 AAA cases where a debt was not in dispute, consumers pursued claims for $1,000 or less in arbitration only 23 times. According to The New York Times's analysis of data from multiple arbitration firms, from 2010 through 2014, there were 505 arbitration cases where a consumer brought a dispute for no more than $2,500. In June 2017, AT&T stated that 412 arbitration cases had been filed against it since the beginning of 2015.

In the 2008 case Tillman v. Commercial Credit Loans, Inc., the Supreme Court of North Carolina noted the lower court's finding of fact that the defendant made 68,000 loans in North Carolina and commenced court actions against over 3,700, yet never had a consumer file arbitration against it. The Tillman court ultimately found the arbitration clause to be unconscionable and therefore unenforceable. According to The New York Times's analysis of data from multiple arbitration firms, from 2010 through 2014, there were 65 arbitration cases involving Verizon Wireless, a business with over 125 million customers, and 7 cases involving Time Warner Cable, which had 15 million customers.

Alan Kaplinsky wrote that the small number of consumer arbitration cases resulted from fifteen years of "negative publicity about arbitration generated by plaintiffs' class action lawyers and consumer advocates".

Recent data indicate a marked increase in the number of consumer arbitration filings connected to so called “mass arbitration” campaigns, suggesting that consumer-initiated arbitrations, while historically rare, have become more common in certain contexts. According to a 2025 summary of filings with the American Arbitration Association (AAA), the organization registered 82 new consumer mass-arbitration filings in 2024, representing a total of 247,327 individual consumer claims, averaging more than 3,000 claims per mass action.

=== Precedent and publicity ===
Arbitration decisions are not precedential.

Richard M. Alderman criticized consumer arbitration for allowing businesses to avoid unfavorable precedents rather than working within the legal system to change them. Alderman also predicted that the common law with respect to consumers would cease to evolve due to arbitration clauses promulgated by businesses.

Arbitrators ordinarily do not provide a written award in commercial arbitrations.

Arbitrations are also generally private: unlike in court trials, members of the public cannot generally attend an arbitration hearing or obtain a copy of the award. The CFPB's preliminary report on arbitration states that "[a]rbitration rules typically do not impose express confidentiality or nondisclosure obligations on parties to the dispute, although arbitrator ethics rules do impose confidentiality obligations on the arbitrator." Arbitration agreements may also contain a confidentiality clause barring the parties from disclosing a dispute or the arbitration proceedings. Satz wrote that the private nature of arbitration eliminates the incentive for businesses not to engage in practices jeopardizing goodwill.

=== Viability of post-dispute arbitration agreements ===
Commentators have discussed whether post-dispute arbitration agreements are a viable alternative to pre-dispute arbitration agreements, especially in the debate on the Arbitration Fairness Act, which would make pre-dispute consumer arbitration agreements unenforceable.

In a 2003 article, Lewis L. Maltby discussed the feasibility of post-dispute arbitration, where both parties agree to arbitrate a specific dispute that has already arisen, in the context of employment relationships. Arbitrations conducted pursuant to a post-dispute agreement made up only 6% of the AAA's 2001 caseload and only 2.6% of its 2002 caseload. Maltby wrote that employers have an incentive not to agree to post-dispute arbitration of small claims since they know that employees would not be able to pursue those claims in litigation due to the costs of retaining counsel. A survey of attorneys representing employers showed that 11 out of 20 employment attorneys would consider the financial status of a represented employee plaintiff in deciding whether to agree to post-dispute arbitration, and 13 out of 20 would do so for pro se employees. Other attorneys, though, did not consider this to be a factor since a "determined employee" would be likely to find representation or receive help from the court in pursuing their case pro se. The survey also indicated that 19 out of 20 employer attorneys would refuse to agree to post-dispute arbitration of a dispute they felt "could be won on a pre-trial motion".

Other commentators disagree with the argument that post-dispute arbitration agreements would be rare. Thomas E. Carbonneau wrote that businesses could offer incentives to entice consumers to arbitrate a dispute after it arises; such incentives may include paying all of the arbitration fees, automatically awarding the consumer party a fraction of its attorney's fees, and having an award for the business reduced by a set proportion.

== Consumer due process standards ==
Both the American Arbitration Association (AAA) and JAMS have criteria that a pre-dispute consumer arbitration agreement must satisfy as a condition of the organization agreeing to administer the arbitration. Examples include the right for the consumer to be represented by an attorney, the right for a consumer to pursue a claim in small claims court, caps on the arbitration fees charged to a consumer, requirements that arbitration hearings take place at a location convenient for the consumer, and the right to demand a written explanation of the arbitrator's award. (Note: For specific references to the applicable rules, see below: Right to attorney representation; Right to pursue claims in small claims court; Arbitration fee caps The AAA considers agreements that require consumers to pay more in arbitration fees than stated in the consumer fee schedule a violation of the Due Process Protocol.; Hearing location; Written explanation of the award) The AAA adopted its Consumer Due Process Protocol in 1998. Timothy Jost wrote that consumer advocates "voiced hope other ADR providers would adopt" the protocol and that the AARP supported it.

The AAA requires businesses with consumer arbitration clauses inconsistent with the Consumer Due Process Protocol to waive the offending provisions for all disputes or remove the AAA from their clause. Christopher R. Drahozal and Samantha Zyontz wrote that, in a sample of 299 cases before the AAA in which an award was issued between April and December 2007, 76.6% of the cases had arbitration agreements that fully complied with the Consumer Due Process Protocol, and only five cases were conducted despite "unwaived protocol violations." In addition, over 150 businesses modified their arbitration clauses in response to a request by the AAA to conform to the Consumer Due Process Protocol. Michael L. Rustad, Richard Buckingham, Diane D'Angelo, and Katherine Durlacher stated that numerous social networking websites had arbitration agreements that violated the AAA Consumer Due Process Protocol. The authors determined that many of the clauses did not adequately inform users about the existence of an arbitration agreement or the consequences of agreeing to arbitration. The standards of the Consumer Due Process Protocol have been cited by courts resolving disputes over the enforceability of arbitration agreements. In 2003, Reginald Alleyne wrote that courts tended to enforce arbitration agreements if they complied with "minimum 'due process' standards". Jean Sternlight, though, wrote that courts have rarely referenced consumer arbitration standards, and when they do, it is to defeat a challenge that an arbitration clause is unfair.

Some commentators have raised concerns over the limitations of private self-regulation by arbitration forums in the form of consumer standards. In 2004, Mark E. Budnitz expressed concern that businesses can circumvent consumer protection policies of arbitration organizations by naming alternative arbitration administrators. In 2007, Martin H. Malin wrote in the context of pre-dispute employment arbitration agreements that the concern that "rogue arbitration agencies" could "place competitive pressure on AAA and JAMS to deviate from their rules and policies" was "not a widespread problem," in part due to the reputations of AAA and JAMS. Although Malin in 2012 commended the AAA and JAMS employment protocols as positive examples of self-regulation, he criticized the decision of the New York Court of Appeals in Brady v. Williams Capital Group (2010), which held that the American Arbitration Association's rules requiring the employer to pay all the arbitrator's fees could not override an express contractual provision requiring the arbitrator's fees to be split equally. Malin criticized Brady for allowing businesses to circumvent such protocols by stating that the arbitration provider's rules would only apply "except as provided in" the arbitration agreement. Jeffrey W. Stempel wrote that courts have refused to consider consumer protection policies as part of arbitration agreements even when the named administrator requires compliance with those policies as a condition of administering an arbitration. J. Watson Hamilton and Jean Sternlight wrote that consumers have no recourse if an arbitration organization or an arbitrator chooses not to follow its own consumer standards.

There have been suggestions that arbitration regulations incorporate the consumer standards in some form. Amy J. Schmitz wrote that voluntary due process protocols are insufficient because businesses could avoid their application by using ad hoc arbitration rather than an arbitration organization, and therefore she suggested that Congress legislatively require all consumer arbitration to satisfy the due process protocols. American Arbitration Association Senior Vice President Richard Naimark said that the AAA has suggested that Congress require all arbitrations to comply with "something like the due process protocols". The Fair Arbitration Act would impose standards on consumer arbitration based on the AAA Consumer Due Process Protocol.

== Proposed modifications to consumer arbitration law ==
=== Carve-outs ===
Bills have been proposed that would carve out some disputes from the applicability of the FAA, nullifying arbitration clauses as applied to those disputes. The first example of such a carve-out was the Motor Vehicle Franchise Arbitration Act, signed into law in 2002, which nullified arbitration clauses in car dealership franchise contracts. Subsequent legislation carved-out disputes involving high-interest loans to military members, poultry and livestock farmers, and defense contractors bringing claims about civil rights or alleged sexual assault. In 2014 Barack Obama issued an executive order prohibiting federal contractors from enforcing arbitration clauses against employees bringing civil rights claims or alleging sexual assault.

==== Restoring Statutory Rights Act ====
In February 2016, Senators Patrick Leahy (D-VT) and Al Franken (D- MN) introduced the "Restoring Statutory Rights Act." If enacted, the legislation "would prevent companies from imposing forced arbitration in cases covered by consumer protection laws, as well as in employment discrimination and other civil rights matters." In addition to the primary sponsors, several other senators agreed to cosponsor the legislation in honor of Equal Pay Day 2016, including Senators Barbara Mikulski (D-Md.), Patty Murray (D-Wash.), Tammy Baldwin (D-Wis.), Kirsten Gillibrand (D-N.Y.), Heidi Heitkamp (D-N.D.), Barbara Boxer (D-Calif.), Mazie Hirono (D-Hawaii), Maria Cantwell (D-Wash.), Judy Chu (D-CA) and Jeanne Shaheen (D-N.H.). Senator Elizabeth Warren is also a cosponsor of the Restoring Statutory Rights Act.

Representatives Hank Johnson and John Conyers introduced parallel legislation into the U.S. House of Representatives on April 12, 2016, Equal Pay Day. They explain, "Forced arbitration has created a rigged system that blocks women from enforcing their legal rights against unaccountable and unlawful corporations for wage violations in the workplace.”

According to The Hill, "The legislation is [Senator] Leahy’s response to a New York Times investigation that found companies are circumventing the courts by forcing consumers in fine print to settle disputes privately with an arbitrator chosen by the company. The clauses often prohibit consumers from joining class action lawsuits as well."

The proposed legislation states that the Federal Arbitration Act "did not, and should not have been interpreted to, supplant or nullify the legislatively created rights and remedies which Congress … has granted to the people of the United States for resolving disputes in State and Federal courts."

==== Arbitration Fairness Act ====
A bill with the title "Arbitration Fairness Act" has been introduced in Congress several times (more recently, a similar act has been introduced as the FAIR act). In May 2011, Democratic Senators Al Franken and Richard Blumenthal and Democratic Representative Hank Johnson introduced the Arbitration Fairness Act, which would have the effect of barring pre-dispute agreements requiring arbitration of consumer, employee, or "civil rights" disputes. It would also require courts, rather than arbitrators, to determine the applicability of the Federal Arbitration Act to a dispute.

Commentators have criticized the Arbitration Fairness Act on several fronts. According to Mauricio Gomm-Santos and Quinn Smith, because the Arbitration Fairness Act uses the new terms "consumer dispute", "employment dispute", and "civil rights dispute", litigation would be needed to develop case law interpreting those terms, and additionally, even outside those areas, a party seeking to avoid or delay arbitration could cast the dispute as a consumer, employment, or civil rights dispute, forcing a court to issue a decision on the applicability of the FAA. Gomm-Santos and Smith also write that the Arbitration Fairness Act would conflict with the New York Convention and the Panama Convention, which allow for courts to assist in arbitration and confirm arbitration awards, and may affect the ability of businesses in the United States to arbitrate outside of the United States disputes covered by the Arbitration Fairness Act.

In 2012, Gilles and Friedman wrote that the general opinion was that the Arbitration Fairness Act would not pass "in the current political environment".

=== Fair Arbitration Act ===
Senator Jeff Sessions (R-AL) has introduced bills modifying the Federal Arbitration Act, all substantially the same. The bill was titled the "Fair Arbitration Act" in 2007 and 2011; it was previously introduced in 2000 (under the title "Consumer and Employee Arbitration Bill of Rights") and 2002 (under the title "Arbitration Fairness Act"). The Fair Arbitration Act would impose standards on arbitration proceedings based on the AAA Consumer Due Process Protocol. The 2007 version of the bill (S. 1135 in the 110th Congress) would impose a number of regulations on arbitration agreements in general, including regulating how conspicuous arbitration agreements are, requiring arbitration to be conducted by "an independent, neutral alternative dispute resolution organization", and mandating that "[e]ach party shall have a vote in the selection of the arbitrator", (Note: Sources disagree as to the effect of this provision. Stipanowich interpreted the provision to bar "list selection of arbitrators" and require the appointment of a three arbitrator panel, where each party selects one arbitrator. Sam Luttrell wrote that the provision would prohibit "the institutional appointment of arbitrators" and "impose[]" the "party-arbitrator system". Alexander wrote that the Fair Arbitration Act would require parties to have "a voice ... in the selection of the arbitrator". In a statement made on April 17, 2007, upon the introduction of the 2007 bill, Sen. Sessions said that "All parties to the arbitration will have an equal voice in selecting a neutral arbitrator. This ensures that the large company who sold a consumer a product will not select the arbitrator itself, because the consumer with a grievance will have the right to nominate potential arbitrators, too. As a result, the final arbitrator selected will have to have the explicit approval of both parties to the dispute. This helps ensure that the arbitrator will be a neutral party with no allegiance to either party.") who would be required to meet certain qualifications and provide broad neutrality disclosures. The 2007 bill would also regulate the arbitration process itself by setting time limits on the process, requiring application of the law of the state where the nondrafting party of the agreement resides, (Note: In a statement made on April 17, 2007, upon the introduction of the 2007 bill, Sen. Sessions said that under the Fair Arbitration Act, arbitrators would be required to apply "the same conflict of laws principles that a court would" to determine what state's law would apply in arbitration.) and demanding that the arbitrator grant "relevant and necessary prehearing depositions". The 2007 bill would also require arbitration agreements to allow either party to pursue an action in small claims court instead of arbitration. According to Stipanowich, the bill was opposed by "commercial clients and practitioners" who saw the bill as making it difficult for the parties to adapt the arbitration process. Jean Sternlight criticized that the Fair Arbitration Act would only outlaw specific unfair practices and businesses could therefore devise and implement new unfair arbitration practices not covered by the Fair Arbitration Act. According to Sternlight, consumer and employee advocacy groups opposed the Fair Arbitration Act because it would legitimize pre-dispute agreements to arbitrate consumer and employee disputes. Sam Luttrell criticized the Fair Arbitration Act's neutrality requirements, saying they would prevent familiar arbitrators with expertise, who do not meet the neutrality requirements of the Fair Arbitration Act, from presiding over commercial arbitrations. According to Thomas V. Burch, the Fair Arbitration Act "received little, if any, widespread support": none of the 2000, 2002, or 2007 versions had cosponsors.

=== Consumer Financial Protection Bureau study and rulemaking ===
The 2010 Dodd–Frank Wall Street Reform and Consumer Protection Act requires the Consumer Financial Protection Bureau (CFPB) to conduct a study of pre-dispute arbitration agreements in consumer financial services contracts. The CFPB can restrict or ban the usage of arbitration clauses in consumer financial services contracts based on the results of the study. The CFPB has no authority to regulate other consumer arbitration agreements, or post-dispute arbitration agreements. The CFPB could also bring enforcement actions against financial businesses that abuse arbitration clauses, according to bankers. On April 24, 2012, the CFPB published a request for information on conducting the study; comments were due June 23, 2012.

The CFPB has hired Christopher Drahozal, a University of Kansas law professor, as a consultant on the study. In June 2013, the CFPB proposed a telephone survey of credit card holders regarding their awareness and perception of arbitration agreements in credit card contracts. The CFPB has also issued an order for financial companies to provide copies of their consumer agreements for the arbitration study. On December 12, 2013, the CFPB published preliminary results of its arbitration study. The CFPB stated that it intended to conduct further research focusing on consumer awareness of arbitration provisions, as well as whether consumers consider arbitration provisions in deciding what financial products to buy or use. The CFPB published its final report on arbitration in March 2015. In October 2015, the CFPB announced that its proposed rulemaking on arbitration would include a ban on class action waivers in arbitration agreements and a requirement for businesses to submit arbitration filings to the CFPB. The CFPB stated that it considered but rejected options of a complete ban on enforcement of arbitration clauses or requiring arbitration clauses to "have procedures to ensure that individual arbitrations are administered in accordance with principles of fundamental fairness". The rules will be presented to a small business panel, after which a public comment period will follow. The CFPB announced publication of a proposed rule on May 5, 2016.

Reception of the proposed rules was mixed. Consumer groups praised the proposed rules but criticized the CFPB's decision not to ban arbitration entirely. According to Ken Sweet of the Associated Press, arbitration experts believe that the ban on class action waivers would cause businesses to remove arbitration clauses entirely, since arbitration, "which is typically paid for by the bank, becomes less cost-effective." Nearly 13,000 comments on the proposed rules were submitted by the August 22, 2016 deadline, which, according to Yuka Hayashi of The Wall Street Journal, would entail a "rough road ahead" for finalizing the rule.

Rules promulgated by the CFPB with respect to arbitration clauses will only apply to contracts entered into at least 180 days after such promulgation. Gilles and Friedman suggest that this "grandfather clause" would cause a "dash to insert waivers that will follow any rulemaking", and they say that it would have an effect on credit card agreements where cardholders are subject to contracts that are in effect for a long period of time. Alan Kaplinsky wrote in April 2016 that "companies who do not presently use arbitration agreements in their financial services contracts should strongly consider adding them" to take advantage of the grandfather clause.

According to an American Banker article, the banking industry believes that the CFPB will issue rules restricting consumer arbitration in financial services contracts. Ballard Spahr attorney Alan Kaplinsky said, "The CFPB seems to be setting the stage for a rulemaking which will likely not be favorable to the industry", citing the choice of data the CFPB included in its preliminary report. In an article in American Banker, Michael Harmon and Larry Childs suggested that any CFPB regulations limiting the ability for banks to include arbitration provisions in their consumer contracts could result in "a big showdown over the power of the CFPB". Janet Cooper Alexander wrote that if the CFPB issues regulations that have the effect of reversing Concepcion, the Supreme Court may well strike those regulations, especially if the findings from the arbitration study are deemed insufficient to justify the regulations. In October 2015, Matt Adler, the chair of Pepper Hamilton's arbitration practice, said that the Supreme Court would find the proposed CFPB rule banning class action waivers in arbitration agreements to be invalid since, he argued, the Dodd-Frank Act did not explicitly amend the FAA and the CFPB lacks expertise to make rules about arbitration. F. Paul Bland responded that the express delegation of arbitration rulemaking authority to the CFPB was consistent with other laws authorizing executive agencies to make rules.

== Consumer arbitration outside the United States ==
According to Amy J. Schmitz, consumer arbitration agreements are not as regularly enforced in Europe and other countries as they are in the United States. European Union directives classify pre-dispute consumer arbitration clauses as "unfair" terms. Under French law, pre-dispute arbitration agreements in consumer contracts where the consumer has little bargaining power were considered "unfair" and therefore not enforceable under the French Civil Code, but after a reform enacted in 2016 they are now allowed. In Germany, consumer arbitration agreements "must be written in an 'intelligible and transparent manner'" and must have the form of a separate document signed by both parties. In the United Kingdom, agreements to arbitrate monetary claims of less than £5000 are unenforceable (whether pre- or post-dispute), and pre-dispute consumer arbitration agreements are only enforceable if the business "individually negotiated" the clause and "made [it] in good faith" and the clause is not significantly one-sided against the consumer.

In Japan, consumer arbitration agreements are revocable by the consumer at any time up to the arbitration hearing. In Canada, consumer arbitration is a matter of provincial jurisdiction and three provinces (Ontario, Quebec and Alberta) have passed legislation expressly preserving consumer access to the courts. Ontario and Quebec consumer protection statutes limit enforcement of consumer arbitration clauses and class action waivers. In Alberta, only arbitration clauses approved by the government will be enforced. In the remaining provinces and territories consumer arbitration clauses will block court access for all claims except some statutory “public interest” causes of action. In the 2011 case of Seidel v. TELUS Communications Inc., the Supreme Court of Canada held that where the text, context or purpose of a statute reveals a legislative intention to preserve court access for a statutory cause of action, access to the courts will be retained notwithstanding a mandatory arbitration clause.
