= AT&T Mobility LLC v. Concepcion =

- Supreme Court of the United States

Argued November 9, 2010 Decided April 27, 2011
- Full case name: AT&T Mobility LLC v. Vincent Concepcion, et ux.
- Docket no.: 09-893
- Citations: 563 U.S. 333 (more) 131 S. Ct. 1740; 179 L. Ed. 2d 742

Case history
- Prior: Motion to compel arbitration denied sub nom., Laster v. T-Mobile USA, Inc., No. 3:05-cv-01167, 2008 WL 5216255 (S.D. Cal. Aug. 11, 2008); affirmed sub nom., Laster v. AT&T Mobility LLC, 584 F.3d 849 (9th Cir. 2009); cert. granted, 560 U.S. 923 (2010).
- Subsequent: Remanded, Laster v. AT & T Mobility LLC, 663 F.3d 1034 (9th Cir. 2011); motion to compel arbitration granted, Laster v. T-Mobile USA, Inc., No. 3:05-cv-01167, 2012 WL 1681762 (S.D. Cal. May 9, 2012).

Holding
- The Discover Bank test adopted by California to invalidate certain arbitration agreements with class action waivers is preempted by the Federal Arbitration Act.

Court membership
- Chief Justice John Roberts Associate Justices Antonin Scalia · Anthony Kennedy; Clarence Thomas · Ruth Bader Ginsburg; Stephen Breyer · Samuel Alito; Sonia Sotomayor · Elena Kagan

Case opinions
- Majority: Scalia, joined by Roberts, Kennedy, Thomas, Alito
- Concurrence: Thomas
- Dissent: Breyer, joined by Ginsburg, Sotomayor, Kagan

Laws applied
- Federal Arbitration Act

AT&T Mobility LLC v. Concepcion, 563 U.S. 333 (2011), is a case that was decided by the United States Supreme Court. On April 27, 2011, the Court ruled, by a 5–4 margin, that the Federal Arbitration Act of 1925 preempts state laws that prohibit contracts from disallowing class-wide arbitration, such as the law previously upheld by the California Supreme Court in the case of Discover Bank v. Superior Court. As a result, businesses that include arbitration agreements with class action waivers can require consumers to bring claims only in individual arbitrations, rather than in court as part of a class action.

The decision was described by Jean Sternlight as a "tsunami that is wiping out existing and potential consumer and employment class actions" and by law professor Myriam Gilles as "the real game-changer for class action litigation". By April 2012, Concepcion was cited in at least 76 decisions sending putative class actions to individual arbitration. After the decision, several major businesses introduced or changed arbitration terms in their consumer contracts (some of which were based on the consumer-friendly terms found in the AT&T Mobility agreement), although the hypothesis of massive adoption of consumer arbitration clauses following the decision has been disputed.

== Facts ==
In 2006, Vincent and Liza Concepcion sued AT&T Mobility over contract, contending that the cell phone company had engaged in deceptive advertising by falsely claiming that their wireless plan included free cell phones. Their suit became a class action. AT&T asked the U.S. District Court for the Southern District of California to dismiss the suit, because AT&T's contract required the Concepcions to submit any disputes to individual arbitration rather than filing a class action lawsuit.

Unlike other arbitration agreements, AT&T Mobility's arbitration agreement was designed to facilitate the pursuit of small claims in arbitration. The arbitration agreement provided that AT&T Mobility would pay the entire cost of arbitration (unless the claim was determined to be frivolous). The arbitration would take place in the county where the consumer was located, by telephone, or through document submission, and forms for the arbitration were made available on AT&T Mobility's website. The arbitrator was not limited in the damages it could award to a consumer, and if the consumer received an award greater than AT&T Mobility's last written settlement offer, the award would be increased to $7,500, and the consumer would be entitled to double attorney's fees. This led the United States District Court for the Southern District of California to state that arbitration under AT&T Mobility's agreement was "quick, easy to use, and prompts full or, as described by Plaintiffs, even excess payment to the customer without the need to arbitrate or litigate."

Nevertheless, the district court declined to dismiss the suit, ruling that California law prohibits contracts that unfairly exculpate one party from its wrongdoing, such as clauses that do not allow class action lawsuits alleging fraud in consumer adhesion contracts where the individual damages are small. AT&T appealed the case, saying that the Federal Arbitration Act should preempt state law. On October 27, 2009, the Ninth Circuit Court of Appeals upheld the lower court decision. AT&T, represented by Andrew J. Pincus of Mayer Brown, then appealed to the Supreme Court. After the Supreme Court granted review, appellate lawyer Deepak Gupta of Washington, D.C. was brought in to help represent the Concepcions and to argue the case in the Supreme Court on their behalf.

The Court heard oral arguments on November 9, 2010. Justices Scalia and Sotomayor questioned Pincus (attorney for AT&T Mobility) about when unconscionability doctrines are made under state law. Pincus argued that the California law was not being applied uniformly. Scalia challenged that assertion when he asked, "Are we going to tell the State of California what it has to consider unconscionable?". Other justices questioned different procedural issues arising from the unconscionability discussion and the scope of the rule AT&T was proposing. Deepak Gupta, representing the Concepcions, argued that the contract AT&T imposed on Respondents was clearly unfair. He asserted that state law should be a guidepost in these questions. Some of his arguments drew criticism from Chief Justice John Roberts. Gupta concluded by arguing that California "has made a judgment that if you preclude class-wide relief... that will gut the State's substantive consumer protection laws..."

== Judgment ==
The majority opinion was written by Justice Antonin Scalia, and joined by Chief Justice John Roberts and Justices Anthony Kennedy, Clarence Thomas, and Samuel Alito. "Requiring the availability of class wide arbitration interferes with fundamental attributes of arbitration," Scalia wrote. "We find it hard to believe that defendants would bet the company with no effective means of review, and even harder to believe that Congress would have intended to allow state courts to force such a decision." Justice Scalia focused on the impact California's unconscionability law was having on arbitration clauses - since the rule was invalidating a large proportion of arbitration agreements, the rule must violate the policy in favor of arbitration. Therefore, it was preempted by the FAA.

Justice Stephen Breyer dissented, joined by Justices Ruth Bader Ginsburg, Sonia Sotomayor, and Elena Kagan. Breyer stated that class arbitrations are appropriate ways to resolve claims that are minor individually but significant in the aggregate. "Where does the majority get its contrary idea — that individual, rather than class, arbitration is a fundamental attribute of arbitration?" He said that without class actions, minor frauds would not be remedied. "What rational lawyer would have signed on to represent the Concepcions in litigation for the possibility of fees stemming from a $30.22 claim?"

== Significance ==
Concepcion has been widely criticized in academic literature, and calls for its reversal through an Arbitration Fairness Act have been made. Following Concepcion, many businesses introduced or renewed motions to move pending lawsuits to arbitration. In September 2011, J. Russell Jackson described the Supreme Court's ruling in Concepcion as "the decision that has launched a thousand motions", as defendants sought to compel arbitration of cases that had been pending "for some time", especially in California. In April 2012, Public Citizen published a list of 76 putative class actions where a court cited Concepcion in granting a motion to compel individual arbitration. University of Kansas law professor Christopher Drahozal wrote that the Public Citizen statistic overstated the impact of Concepcion, as several decisions applied state law that permitted class action waivers prior to Concepcion. Cardozo law professor Myriam Gilles wrote that the Concepcion decision had a greater impact on class actions than Wal-Mart v. Dukes, since Concepcion allowed businesses to avoid class actions by including arbitration clauses in boilerplate terms.

The Concepcion decision also impacted the usage of arbitration clauses in consumer contracts, including the usage of "consumer-friendly" arbitration terms like the ones in AT&T's agreement. Jean Sternlight said that the Concepcion decision would cause businesses to include arbitration clauses with class action waivers, saying that the Concepcion decision removed the possibility of "costly litigation" over whether such terms are enforceable. In a 2012 research paper, Gilles wrote that the majority opinion in Concepcion led to a "race to the top" in implementing arbitration procedures that are more friendly to consumer claims and more likely to allow their vindication. Gilles wrote that corporate lawyers encouraged companies to implement terms similar to the ones used by AT&T Mobility and upheld in Concepcion. According to Gilles, many large consumer-oriented businesses changed their arbitration provisions in 2011 and 2012. However, Gilles noted that only 6 out of the 37 companies she examined had arbitration clauses that "offered anything close to AT&T's set of incentives, and none were quite as generous". Ann Marie Tracey and Shelley McGill wrote that businesses would introduce more consumer-unfriendly terms in their arbitration clauses since unconscionability "provided strong motivation for business to draft agreements fairly in the pre-Concepcion environment; that motivation does not exist in the post-Concepcion era." Suzanna Sherry said that the broad holding of the decision would make harsh arbitration clauses, similar to the earliest consumer arbitration clauses, enforceable, since the unconscionability doctrine that had been used to strike down those harsh clauses could be found preempted based on Concepcion.

Several large businesses introduced arbitration provisions after Concepcion, and several companies' addition of arbitration clauses was reported by the media to have been prompted by the Supreme Court's ruling in Concepcion. According to a September 2011 CNN article, a Sony spokesperson said that Sony added an arbitration clause to its PlayStation Network terms of service because "[t]he Supreme Court recently ruled in the AT&T case that language like this is enforceable". PCWorld writer Jared Newman cited Sony and Microsoft as examples of companies that took advantage of Concepcion to add arbitration agreements with class action waivers. Drahozal and University of Georgia law professor Peter B. Rutledge wrote that Sony and Netflix added arbitration provisions following data breach class action litigation. Other companies reported to have added arbitration provisions to their consumer contracts after Concepcion include Umpqua Bank, Valve, eBay, PayPal, Instagram, and StubHub. American Arbitration Association Senior Vice President Richard Naimark said that a number of companies increased their usage of consumer arbitration after Concepcion, while before Concepcion, the number of consumer arbitrations administered by the AAA had been declining. Rutledge and Drahozal wrote that the adoption of arbitration in franchise contracts did not significantly increase after Concepcion or Am. Express Co. v. Italian Colors Rest., a case decided in 2013 that closely followed Concepcion, casting doubt on the hypothesis that Concepcion would cause businesses to adopt arbitration en masse. In November 2015, Stephen L. Carter wrote that although he and other critics had predicted that businesses would introduce "increasingly burdensome and one-sided arbitration clauses", "this hasn't happened".

Concepcion's prohibition on class actions has not necessarily led to a proportionate increase in individual claims filed through the arbitration system. AT&T, for instance, saw only 204 complaints resolved through the arbitration system in 2018, compared to AT&T's customer base of over 150 million subscribers.

== See also ==
- United States contract law
- United States labor law
- Federal Arbitration Act
- Class action waiver
- List of United States Supreme Court cases, volume 563
