= Alan Kaplinsky =

American lawyer (born 1945)

Alan S. Kaplinsky
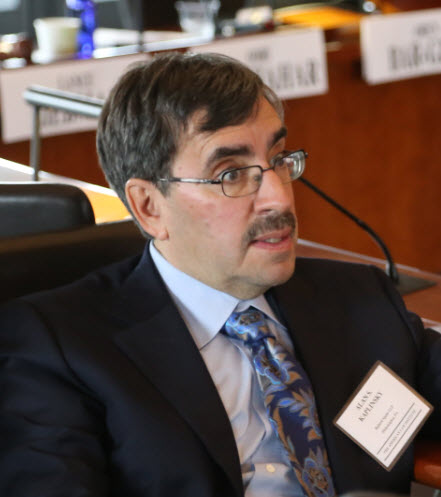
- Born: Alan Stuart Kaplinsky; December 1, 1945 (age 80); Holyoke, Massachusetts, U.S.
- Education: University of Pennsylvania (BS); Boston College (JD)
- Occupation: Lawyer
- Spouse: Ellen
- Children: 3

Alan Stuart Kaplinsky (born December 1, 1945) is an American lawyer. He heads the consumer financial services practice at Ballard Spahr. Kaplinsky "pioneered the use of pre-dispute arbitration provisions in consumer contracts" and has written and lectured extensively on the subject.

== Career ==
After graduating from the University of Pennsylvania in 1967 and Boston College Law School in 1970, Kaplinsky clerked for Judge John Biggs, Jr. on the United States Court of Appeals for the Third Circuit before joining the Philadelphia law firm of Wolf, Block, Schorr and Solis-Cohen. From 1976 to 1979 he served as General Counsel of the Teachers Service Organization, Inc.

In 1995, Kaplinsky joined Ballard Spahr LLP along with several colleagues from Wolf, Block, Schorr and Solis-Cohen to found a consumer financial services practice at Ballard Spahr. Kaplinsky is best known for pioneering the use of arbitration provisions in the consumer finance area, including credit cards and auto loans. He is the first lawyer in the country to include class action waiver language in consumer arbitration clauses that require consumers to individually arbitrate any dispute.

== Academia, law reform work, and board memberships ==
Kaplinsky was the first president of the American College of Consumer Financial Services Lawyers (1996–1998) and chair of the Committee on Consumer Financial Services of the Section of Business Law of the American Bar Association. He has chaired the Practising Law Institute's Annual Institute on Consumer Financial Services since its inception in 1995.

Kaplinsky was elected to the American Law Institute in 2006 and in 2012 was named an Adviser on the Restatement Third, The Law of Consumer Contracts.

In 2014, Kaplinsky was named to the Board of Directors of the National Jazz Museum in Harlem, whose mission is "to preserve, promote, and present jazz by inspiring knowledge, appreciation and celebration of jazz locally, nationally, and internationally".

== Personal life ==
He and his wife Ellen have three children.
