= Berry v CCL Secure Ltd =

Judgement of the High Court of Australia

Benoy Berry & Global Secure Currency Limited v CCL Secure Pty Ltd
- Court: High Court of Australia
- Decided: 5 August 2020
- Citation: [2020] HCA 27

Case history
- Prior actions: [2019] FCAFC 81 [2017] FCA 1546 [2018] FCA 1351

Court membership
- Judges sitting: Bell, Gageler, Keane, Nettle, & Edelman JJ

Case opinions
- appeal allowed (per Bell, Keane, Nettle JJ) concurring (Gageler, Edelman JJ)

Benoy Berry & Global Secure Currency Limited v CCL Secure Pty Ltd is a decision of the High Court of Australia, concerning the assessment of damages for deliberately deceptive conduct under s82 of the Trade Practices Act (an act since repealed and replaced by the Australian Consumer Law, but with provisions worded similar to s82).

== Factual background ==
The appellants (Benoy Berry) had entered into an agency agreement with the respondent. Under the agreement, the appellants would receive commissions on sales of polymer notes. The agreement provided for its automatic renewal every two years; unless terminated in accordance with its termination clauses.

In early 2008, the respondent induced termination of the agreement by the appellant by means of a false representation.

The appellant sought damages under s82 of the Trade Practices Act, referable to the commissions they would have been owed had the contract not been terminated. The primary judge found that damages should be assessed by reference to the presumed continuation of the agency agreement as automatically renewed every two years up to the date of trial. The judge also held that as the respondent had engaged in misleading/deceptive conduct, the respondent could not be heard to complain it had a lawful alternative means of termination it elected not to take.

On appeal the Full Federal Court considered that the primary judge's approach gave insufficient weight to the possibility of lawful termination. It concluded that despite the respondent's conduct; the agreement would have been lawfully terminated on 30 June 2008, dis-entitling the appellant to damages for lack of a causal link between the breach and the harm suffered.

== Decision ==
The Court found unanimously for Benoy Berry, the appellant.

=== Bell, Keane, Nettle JJ ===
The majority held that the respondent was not prevented from leading evidence about whether any relevant damages that had been caused by their conduct. The court viewed the damages applicable to s82 of the TPA as compensatory, rather than punitive. They regarded Amann Aviation as authority for the proposition that, ordinarily, the purpose of 'compensatory damages' in the common law is 'fair and adequate compensation', not punishment, and that 'artificial forms of reasoning', are rejected in favor of 'allowing tribunals to give probative force to evidentiary materials as they think fit having regard to all circumstances of the case'. The court wrote:

"Permitting a fraudster to plead and prove a lawful counterfactual which, but for its fraud, the fraudster would have pursued, is not in any sense to permit the fraudster to take advantage of its fraud. As will be explained, it is to do no more than to limit the amount recoverable by the victim to the amount of loss or damage which the victim is shown to have suffered “by” the contravening conduct within the meaning of s 82 of the TPA. That accords with the general principle at common law that a wrongdoer is not required to compensate a victim for loss which the wrongdoer does not cause, even where the cause of action is the tort of deceit." - Bell, Keane and Nettle JJ

Ultimately however, this matter did not determine the case, as the majority found Secure had not proven there was a real possibility it would have otherwise terminated the agency agreement.

The court found that the plaintiff bore the onus of proving what the objective value of the contract would have been, had it not been terminated. That assessment had to take into account events that may have rendered the contract less valuable. It was the court's job to assume that the wrongdoer would have adopted the mode of performance most beneficial to them; and so if the contract was lawfully terminable, it was to be valued accordingly. This does not automatically mean a wrongdoer's right to terminate a contract restricts the damages that can be awarded. The court cited Lavarack v Woods of Colchester Ltd, as authority for the proposition that one must not assume a wrongdoer would cut off legal obligations to the claimant; if greater losses would have occurred due to the extraneous circumstances (such as the need to maintain their reputation).

However, they held that since it was established on the balance of probabilities that the respondent terminated the agency agreement by misleading the appellant, the natural inference was that the respondent would not have been prepared to terminate the agreement by lawful means. Therefore, the respondent carried the burden of proof that their misleading conduct did not give rise to financial damages for the appellant.

As it happened, the respondent did not adduce sufficient evidence to establish that but for their misconduct the relevant damage would have occurred. The court therefore found against the respondent.

=== Gageler, Edelman JJ ===
The justices agreed with the orders proposed by the majority, however suggested that the case ought to have been decided on narrower grounds; relating to the manner in which the respondent had set out its pleadings. The defendant at trial had indicated its intention to prove it would have terminated the agency agreement by 30 June 2008 regardless of the conduct; by calling evidence of a Mr Brown. The evidence of Mr Brown was 'thoroughly disbelieved' by the trial judge, and the consequent rejection of the respondent's pleaded defence 'ought to have been the end of the issue'.

As the only action Berry had succeeded in against the respondent was statutory, they regarded the findings of the primary judge findings about the ability of the respondent to be heard; 'couched in the conclusion language of a common law action in deceit (were) an unfortunate distraction'.
