= Stephens v. American Arbitration Association =

Lawsuit

Stephens v. American Arbitration Association is a proposed class action lawsuit filed in the United States regarding alternative dispute resolution (ADR) and arbitration. Introduced in the Federal District Court for the District of Arizona, the lawsuit accuses the American Arbitration Association (AAA), an ADR administer, of being an illegal monopoly over ADR, and using its position to disproportionately favor corporations in proceedings.

== Background ==
Since the passage of the Federal Arbitration Act in 1925, companies frequently advocate for arbitration as a more efficient alternative to court for individual consumer disputes. However, critics have long argued that arbitration lacks the procedural safeguards of the U.S. court system and predominantly benefits corporate defendants. According to the Illinois Law Review, under Chief Justice John Roberts, the Supreme Court of the United States has made many decisions which advance the usage of arbitration, especially in class action contexts.

The AAA is one of the largest providers of ADR services in the United States, and according to its 2020 annual report, the organization has handled six million cases since it was founded in 1926. According to the complaint, the AAA has 88% market share in arbitrations, with its nearest rival, JAMS, holding only 12%. The class action filing, filed by Arizona resident Stephanie Stephens, alleges that because of how the American Arbitration Association has structured how it charges fees, they significantly limit how much arbitrators can charge and earn handling consumer arbitrations, and this combined with how arbitrators are often filled by retired attorneys allegedly funded by large firms contributes to what her complaint argues is anti-competitive. Stephens' complaint also alleges that because of this structure, the AAA is able to ensure that consumers lose 76% of the time in AAA-administered cases.
