= Class action waiver =

Contractual provision prohibiting certain lawsuits

A class action waiver is a provision found in some contracts which prohibits a party from filing a class action legal proceeding against the other party, or both parties waiving the right to file class actions against each other. Though used internationally, class action waivers, just like class action lawsuits, are predominantly an American phenomenon and most frequently both found and upheld in the United States and agreements with American citizens.

Class action waivers may be found on a standalone basis, though they are more commonly found as part of an arbitration clause, and when paired with such clauses, frequently include jury trial waivers. All three clauses are the subject to controversy and wide legal debate, with supporters claiming the tools are strong risk management tools and the expense that class action litigation presents both in regard to time and money, though advocacy groups argue that these clauses reduce the rights of consumers and employees and prevent companies from being held accountable for grievances such as wage and hour violations.

Class action waivers legality across countries and administrative decisions range in legality between jurisdictions, with some countries like France and administrative divisions like Ontario in Canada banning such clauses, while others, most prominently the United States via its Supreme Court ruling in AT&T Mobility LLC v. Concepcion, have rules that such clauses are enforceable.

== Contractual language ==
A common example of a class action waiver clause is,

We each agree that any dispute resolution proceedings will be conducted only on an individual basis and not in a class, consolidated or representative action.

== Legal status in the United States ==
=== Federal level ===
The Supreme Court of the United States has found on multiple occasions that class action waivers are legal, though in all ruled circumstances on the issue, the Supreme Court has only ruled on class action waivers attached to arbitration agreements. In AT&T Mobility LLC v. Concepcion, the high court ruled that class action waivers are legal under the Federal Arbitration Act as they significantly impact what the court saw as Congress's pro-arbitration stance. The court reiterated its stance in Epic Systems Corp. v. Lewis. In Epic, Justice Neil Gorsuch authored a majority opinion which outlined that the US Congress, upon legislating the National Labor Relations Act of 1935, likely did not wish "to confer a right to class or collective actions in [Section 7 of the NLRA], since those procedures were hardly known when the NLRA was adopted in 1935". Justice Clarence Thomas concurred in a separate opinion, writing that the illegality of the class action waiver is a public policy defense, referring to McMullen v. Hoffman.

Class action waivers in any jurisdiction, however, are not enforceable in cases of sexual assault or sexual harassment; the 117th Congress passed and President Joe Biden signed the Ending Forced Arbitration of Sexual Assault and Sexual Harassment Act in 2022 which additionally prohibited the enforcement of class action waivers. As of 2023, the bipartisan law has been used by employees of companies, most notably Rivian, to sidestep class action waivers. Prior to Epic and AT&T, New York and California have attempted to ban class action waivers, and in the case of California, use such laws to additionally invalidate arbitration agreements or allow judges to refuse to enforce class action waivers in certain circumstances. National lawmakers have also pushed to pass the proposed Forced Arbitration Injustice Repeal Act, which would ban the enforcement of both arbitration clauses and class action waivers in many cases today seen by some as unfair or anti-consumer.

Class action waivers and arbitration agreements have also been argued to be unenforceable by the US Department of Labor, which argued to the Sixth Circuit that the two run contrary to statutory rights with regard to fiduciary misconduct.

=== Naked class waivers ===
A "naked" class action waiver is a version of the waiver where the contract in which the waiver is found is not attached to an arbitration agreement. Class action waivers are only protected from state legislatures' actions through the Federal Arbitration Act, if they are bundled with an agreement to send disputes to arbitration. The Supreme Court has yet to rule on whether naked class waivers are permissible.

Some jurisdictions have laws or legal precedent which are friendly to naked class action waivers. In March 2006, the state of Utah passed a law which expressly permitted class action waivers in contracts, seen by opponents of Utah's law as retaliation against California's courts, which prior to the SCOTUS ruling on class action waivers, had prohibited class action waivers. The Fifth Circuit also ruled that within its circuit, class action waivers not attached to an arbitration agreement are legal in a 2017 case between the NLRB and D. R. Horton, Inc.

Naked class action waivers, though, are subject to state laws, and as demonstrated in 2023 by rulings made by courts in New Jersey and Rhode Island, they may be overturned and declared unconscionable by state courts. New Jersey's trial and appellate courts, though, were overruled by their state's Supreme Court, which ruled that naked class action waivers were enforceable and not contrary to public policy.

== Legal status in other countries ==
Many countries have not tested a class action waiver in courts, though the international law firm CMS predicts that these clauses are unconscionable or unenforceable in Germany, Italy, Russia, and in England and Wales.

=== Australia ===
Class action waivers remained untested in Australia until December 2021, where the Federal Court of Australia found it was an unfair contract term. In Karpik, the court found that Australian Consumer Law in section 23 (which already bans standard form contracts) prohibits class action waivers. On appeal, the Full Court of the Federal Court of Australia reversed, only to be later unanimously overturned by the High Court of Australia, in the process also striking down Carnival's forum selection clause which would have otherwise required Karpik to file legal action in the United States.

=== Canada ===
==== National level ====
Class action waivers lack a uniform policy across Canada, as the Supreme Court of Canada has found that provincial legislation governs disputes. Nationally, though, in Seidel v. TELUS Communications, the court found that because a class action waiver was attached to an invalid arbitration agreement, the class action waiver was void.

==== Provincial level ====
On the provincial level, Ontario, per the Consumer Protection Act of 2002, has banned class action waivers; similar laws have been passed in the provinces of Quebec and Saskatchewan. Courts in British Columbia also previously found that class action waivers were unenforceable and unconscionable in Pearce v. 4 Pillars Consulting Group due to the contract in question being a standard form contract written by 4 Pillars and giving little bargaining power to Pearce. British Columbian courts, however, have overridden this ruling in 2023 litigation against Pokémon Go and Harry Potter: Wizards Unite developer Niantic, where a trial court and a court of appeals ruled in 2023 that such clauses were legal and enforceable, pointing specifically to other provinces which had banned them and how British Columbia had no such ban; the court further ruled that legislatures as opposed to courts are to create exemptions or prohibitions on class action waivers.

=== France ===
Under Article L. 623-32 of the French Consumer Code, as well as Article L. 1143-21 of the French Public Health Code, France considers class action waivers "abusive" and illegal within the country.

=== India ===
Class action waivers have not been tested in Indian courts, though Order 1 Rule 8 of the Code of Civil Procedure allows for consumers, with court permission, to initiate class action lawsuits, which the Indian law firm Shardul Amarchand Mangaldas & Co notes can be problematic for the enforceability of class action waivers.

== See also ==
- Arbitration clause
- Forced Arbitration Injustice Repeal Act
