= List of acts of the Parliament of Victoria from 2021 =

This is a list of acts of the Parliament of Victoria, Australia for the year 2021.

== 2021 ==
Short title, or popular name	Citation	Royal assent
Long title
Consumer and Other Acts Miscellaneous Amendments Act 2021	No. 1 of 2021	9 February 2021
An Act to make miscellaneous amendments to the Associations Incorporation Reform Act 2012, (Note: Associations Incorporation Reform Act 2012 (No. 20 of 2012)) the Australian Consumer Law and Fair Trading Act 2012, (Note: Australian Consumer Law and Fair Trading Act 2012 (No. 21 of 2012)) the Gambling Regulation Act 2003, (Note: Gambling Regulation Act 2003 (No. 114 of 2003)) the Liquor Control Reform Act 1998, (Note: Liquor Control Reform Act 1998 (No. 94 of 1998)) the Residential Tenancies Act 1997, (Note: Residential Tenancies Act 1997 (No. 109 of 1997)) the Residential Tenancies Amendment Act 2018, (Note: Residential Tenancies Amendment Act 2018 (No. 45 of 2018)) the Rooming House Operators Act 2016, (Note: Rooming House Operators Act 2016 (No. 26 of 2016)) the Victorian Civil and Administrative Tribunal Act 1998 (Note: Victorian Civil and Administrative Tribunal Act 1998 (No. 53 of 1998)) to make statute law revision amendments to consumer Acts and for other purposes.
Public Health and Wellbeing Amendment Act 2021	No. 2 of 2021	
Change or Suppression (Conversion) Practices Prohibition Act 2021	No. 3 of 2021	16 February 2021
An Act to prohibit change or suppression practices, to amend certain definitions in the Equal Opportunity Act 2010 (Note: Equal Opportunity Act 2010 (No. 16 of 2010)) and for other purposes.
Owners Corporations and Other Acts Amendment Act 2021	No. 4 of 2021	
Workplace Injury Rehabilitation and Compensation Amendment (Provisional Payments) Act 2021	No. 5 of 2021	
Summary Offences Amendment (Decriminalisation of Public Drunkenness) Act 2021	No. 6 of 2021	
Public Health and Wellbeing Amendment (State of Emergency Extension) Act 2021	No. 7 of 2021	
Constitution Amendment (Fracking Ban) Act 2021	No. 8 of 2021	
Education and Training Reform Amendment Act 2021	No. 9 of 2021	
Education and Training Reform Amendment (Miscellaneous) Act 2021	No. 10 of 2021	
Justice Legislation Amendment (System Enhancements and Other Matters) Act 2021	No. 11 of 2021	
Planning and Environment Amendment Act 2021	No. 12 of 2021	
Spent Convictions Act 2021	No. 13 of 2021	30 March 2021
An Act to establish a scheme for certain convictions to become spent in Victoria and non-disclosable on a person's criminal record unless in specific circumstances, to consequentially amend the Equal Opportunity Act 2010 and for other purposes.
Industrial Relations Legislation Amendment Act 2021	No. 14 of 2021	
Workplace Injury Rehabilitation and Compensation Amendment (Arbitration) Act 2021	No. 15 of 2021	
Cemeteries and Crematoria Amendment Act 2021	No. 16 of 2021	
Drugs, Poisons and Controlled Substances Amendment Act 2021	No. 17 of 2021	
Zero and Low Emission Vehicle Distance-based Charge Act 2021	No. 18 of 2021	
Appropriation (2021-2022) Act 2021	No. 19 of 2021	16 June 2021
An Act for the appropriation of certain sums out of the Consolidated Fund for the ordinary annual services of the Government for the financial year 2021/2022 and for other purposes.
Appropriation (Parliament 2021-2022) Act 2021	No. 20 of 2021	16 June 2021
An Act for the appropriation of certain sums out of the Consolidated Fund for the Parliament in respect of the financial year 2021/2022 and for other purposes.
Gambling Regulation Amendment (Wagering and Betting Tax) Act 2021	No. 21 of 2021	
State Taxation and Mental Health Acts Amendment Act 2021	No. 22 of 2021	16 June 2021
An Act to amend the Duties Act 2000, (Note: Duties Act 2000 (No. 79 of 2000)) the First Home Owner Grant Act 2000, (Note: First Home Owner Grant Act 2000 (No. 5 of 2000)) the Land Tax Act 2005, (Note: Land Tax Act 2005 (No. 88 of 2005)) the Mental Health Act 2014 (Note: Mental Health Act 2014 (No. 26 of 2014)) and the Payroll Tax Act 2007 (Note: Payroll Tax Act 2007 (No. 26 of 2007)) and to make consequential amendments to other Acts and for other purposes.
Child Wellbeing and Safety (Child Safe Standards Compliance and Enforcement) Amendment Act 2021	No. 23 of 2021	
Education and Training Reform Amendment (Protection of School Communities) Act 2021	No. 24 of 2021	
Mutual Recognition (Victoria) Amendment Act 2021	No. 25 of 2021	
Offshore Petroleum and Greenhouse Gas Storage (Cross-boundary Greenhouse Gas Titles and Other Matters) Amendment Act 2021	No. 26 of 2021	
Commercial Tenancy Relief Scheme Act 2021	No. 27 of 2021	10 August 2021
An Act to temporarily empower the making of regulations to modify the application of the law of Victoria in relation to certain commercial leases and licences and for other purposes.
Energy Legislation Amendment (Energy Fairness) Act 2021	No. 28 of 2021	
Non-Emergency Patient Transport Amendment Act 2021	No. 29 of 2021	
Transport Legislation Miscellaneous Amendments Act 2021	No. 30 of 2021	
Victorian Civil and Administrative Tribunal and Other Acts Amendment (Federal Jurisdiction and Other Matters) Act 2021	No. 31 of 2021	
Education and Training Reform Amendment (Victorian Academy of Teaching and Leadership) Act 2021	No. 32 of 2021	
Energy Legislation Amendment Act 2021	No. 33 of 2021	
Police Informants Royal Commission Implementation Monitor Act 2021	No. 34 of 2021	14 September 2021
An Act to establish the Police Informants Royal Commission Implementation Monitor and for other purposes.
Judicial Proceedings Reports Amendment Act 2021	No. 35 of 2021	
Occupational Health and Safety and Other Legislation Amendment Act 2021	No. 36 of 2021	
Social Services Regulation Act 2021	No. 37 of 2021	21 September 2021
An Act to establish the Social Services Regulator and the worker and carer exclusion scheme and for other purposes.
Forests Legislation Amendment (Compliance and Enforcement) Act 2021	No. 38 of 2021	
Assisted Reproductive Treatment Amendment Act 2021	No. 39 of 2021	
Building Amendment (Registration and Other Matters) Act 2021	No. 40 of 2021	
Essential Services Commission (Compliance and Enforcement Powers) Amendment Act 2021	No. 41 of 2021	
Great Ocean Road and Environs Protection Amendment Act 2021	No. 42 of 2021	19 October 2021
An Act to amend the Great Ocean Road and Environs Protection Act 2020 (Note: Great Ocean Road and Environs Protection Act 2020 (No. 19 of 2020)) in relation to land management of the Great Ocean Road coast and parks, to further provide for functions and powers of the Great Ocean Road Coast and Parks Authority, to provide for the transfer of public land management to that Authority, to consequentially amend other Acts and for other purposes.
Suburban Rail Loop Act 2021	No. 43 of 2021	19 October 2021
An Act to establish the Suburban Rail Loop Authority and confer on the Authority appropriate functions and powers for the Authority to plan and deliver the Suburban Rail Loop and development associated with the Suburban Rail Loop and to enable the Authority to operate, or manage the operation of, the Suburban Rail Loop, or to manage development associated with the Suburban Rail Loop and for other purposes.
Firearms and Other Acts Amendment Act 2021	No. 44 of 2021	
Education and Training Reform Amendment (Senior Secondary Pathways Reforms and Other Matters) Act 2021	No. 45 of 2021	
Forests Amendment (Forest Firefighters Presumptive Rights Compensation) Act 2021	No. 46 of 2021	
Terrorism (Community Protection) Amendment Act 2021	No. 47 of 2021	
Water and Catchment Legislation Amendment Act 2021	No. 48 of 2021	
Liquor Control Reform Amendment Act 2021	No. 49 of 2021	
Special Investigator Act 2021	No. 50 of 2021	30 November 2021
An Act to establish the Office of the Special Investigator to investigate potential criminal conduct and breaches of discipline relating to the recruitment, management and use by Victoria Police of Nicola Maree Gobbo as a human source, to amend certain other Acts and for other purposes.
Victorian Collaborative Centre for Mental Health and Wellbeing Act 2021	No. 51 of 2021	30 November 2021
An Act to establish the Victorian Collaborative Centre for Mental Health and Wellbeing, to make consequential amendments to other Acts and for other purposes.
Windfall Gains Tax and State Taxation and Other Acts Further Amendment Act 2021 or the Windfall Gains Tax Act 2021	No. 52 of 2021	30 November 2021
An Act to impose a windfall gains tax on the increase in the value of land resulting from a rezoning and amend the Duties Act 2000, the Essential Services Commission Act 2001, (Note: Essential Services Commission Act 2001 (No. 62 of 2001)) the Gambling Regulation Act 2003, the Land Tax Act 2005, the State Taxation and Mental Health Acts Amendment Act 2021, (Note: State Taxation and Mental Health Acts Amendment Act 2021 (No. 22 of 2021)) the Taxation Administration Act 1997, (Note: Taxation Administration Act 1997 (No. 40 of 1997)) the Valuation of Land Act 1960, (Note: Valuation of Land Act 1960 (No. 6653)) the Water Act 1989 (Note: Water Act 1989 (No. 80 of 1989)) and the Water Industry Act 1994 (Note: Water Industry Act 1994 (No. 121 of 1994)) and for other purposes.
Public Health and Wellbeing Amendment (Pandemic Management) Act 2021	No. 53 of 2021	
Casino and Gambling Legislation Amendment Act 2021	No. 54 of 2021	
Circular Economy (Waste Reduction and Recycling) Act 2021	No. 55 of 2021	14 December 2021
An Act to introduce a circular economy in Victoria, to provide for the Head, Recycling Victoria, to provide for a regulatory framework for waste, recycling or resource recovery services, to make related and consequential amendments to other Acts and for other purposes.
Equal Opportunity (Religious Exceptions) Amendment Act 2021	No. 56 of 2021	14 December 2021
An Act to amend the Equal Opportunity Act 2010 in relation to exceptions in respect of religion, and for other purposes.

== Sources ==
- "Acts as made: 2021". Victoria Legislation.
