= Wendell Pritchett =

American lawyer, legal scholar, and university administrator

Wendell E. Pritchett
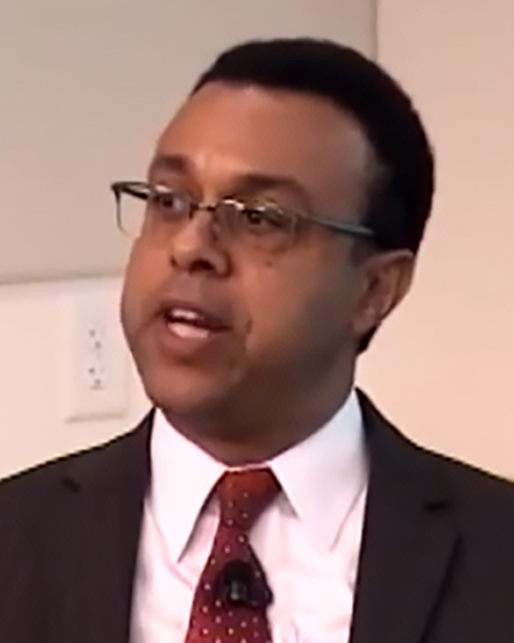

Interim President of the University of Pennsylvania
- In office February 2022 – June 2022
- Preceded by: Amy Gutmann
- Succeeded by: M. Elizabeth Magill

30th Provost of the University of Pennsylvania
- In office July 1, 2017 – July 1, 2021
- Preceded by: Vincent Price

Chancellor of Rutgers University–Camden
- In office June 30, 2009 – July 1, 2014
- Preceded by: Roger Dennis
- Succeeded by: Phoebe A. Haddon

Personal details
- Born: Wendell Eric Pritchett
- Education: Brown University (BA); Yale University (JD); University of Pennsylvania (PhD)

Wendell Eric Pritchett is an American legal scholar and academic. He is currently the James S. Riepe Presidential Professor of Law and Education at the University of Pennsylvania Law School. From February to June 2022, Pritchett served as interim president of the University of Pennsylvania; he is the first Black individual to serve as the university's president.

Pritchett previously served as Chancellor of Rutgers University–Camden (2009–2014), Interim Dean of the University of Pennsylvania Law School (2014-2015), and Provost of the University of Pennsylvania (2017–2022).

== Early life and education ==
Pritchett's father, also named Wendell Pritchett, was a classical pianist and public school teacher, and his mother Carolyn was a high school English teacher. Pritchett grew up in Society Hill, Philadelphia, Pennsylvania, to which his family moved in 1967, and attended Friends Select School. He and his wife Anne Kringel, a native of Milwaukee, have two daughters. Kringel was the director of the legal research and writing program at the University of Pennsylvania Law School for 20 years.

He earned a B.A. in political science from Brown University in 1986. Pritchett earned a J.D. from Yale Law School in 1991, and became a member of the Pennsylvania Bar that year. From 1991 to 1992, he worked at the law firm Wolf, Block, Schorr & Solis-Cohen. He earned a Ph.D. in history from the University of Pennsylvania in 1997 under the direction of Walter Licht.

== Career ==
For five years, from 1997 to 2002, Pritchett was an assistant professor of history at Baruch College of the City University of New York.

Pritchett was a University of Pennsylvania Law School professor from 2001 to 2009, and is the Presidential Professor of Law and Education at the school.

Pritchett served as Chancellor of Rutgers University–Camden and Professor of Law and History from 2009-14. At the time of his appointment, Pritchett became the first Black Chancellor of the university.

In 2012, he was elected president of the Coalition of Urban and Metropolitan Universities. From 2014-2015, he served as interim dean of the University of Pennsylvania Law School and as a presidential professor.

In 2017, Pritchett was named Provost of the University of Pennsylvania; he served in the role through July 2021.

Pritchett has written two books and many articles on urban history and policy, especially in the areas of housing, race relations, land use, and economic development. His first book was Brownsville, Brooklyn: Blacks, Jews and the Changing Face of the Ghetto (University of Chicago Press, 2002). His second book was Robert Clifton Weaver and the American City: The Life and Times of an Urban Reformer (University of Chicago Press, 2008).
