= Repeat-player effect =

In arbitration, the repeat-player effect is a proposition that, outside of the collective bargaining context, employers attain more favorable outcomes in arbitration.

Factors contributing to the repeat-player effect include employers' having more information to gain an advantage in the arbitrator selection process, as well as influence on arbitrators, who may want to rule in the employer's favor to be selected in future arbitrations.

== See also ==
- Mandatory arbitration
- Arbitrator
- Collective bargaining
