= Forum (alternative dispute resolution) =

Forum, formerly known as the National Arbitration Forum (NAF) is an American organization that provides arbitration and mediation services to businesses, based at its Minneapolis headquarters and offices in New Jersey. The organization was founded in 1986. As of 2008, the National Arbitration Forum administered over 200,000 cases a year, most of which were consumer debt collection cases. In 2009, the National Arbitration Forum ceased administration of new consumer arbitrations as part of a consent decree with the Attorney General of Minnesota Lori Swanson concerning the NAF's ties with debt collection firms. The company maintains a panel of over 1,600 arbitrators and mediators who are attorneys and former judges located across the United States and in 35 countries around the world. Panelists arbitrate and mediate the disputes.

The company is an "approved dispute resolution service provider" of ICANN domain name disputes and has handled more than 7,600 cases.

== History ==
The NAF was founded in 1986 as a subsidiary of another company, Equilaw, which subsequently went bankrupt in 1994. NAF survived the bankruptcy and appears to have grown rapidly in recent years. The NAF and Lawyers Associated Worldwide (LAW) work together on an international level. The National Arbitration Forum is located in Minneapolis, Minnesota.

=== Domain name disputes ===
An approved domain name dispute program provider for ICANN, the NAF has administered over 10,000 domain name disputes since 1999. The number of domain name disputes administered is on the rise, up 143 cases from 2006 to 2007. The NAF deals predominantly with registered domain names that are abused by parties who have no legitimate rights to them. Some of the famous trademarks involved in NAF domain name dispute resolutions include Los Angeles Angels, Disney, Hershey's Kisses, Jimmy Buffett, and Univision, most recently Bill Clinton.

== Controversy ==
Consumer advocacy groups and attorneys frequently claim that the National Arbitration Forum is the most biased against consumers of the major arbitration organizations.

In its June 16, 2008 cover story, Business Week published an in-depth look at credit collection arbitrations at NAF. The story describes how NAF markets itself to collection lawyers and then works with them in ways that raise questions about its impartiality.

=== Public Citizen study ===
In 2007, non-profit consumer advocacy group Public Citizen criticized the National Arbitration Forum, including its fee schedule and alleged bias.

According to a July 2008 Navigant analysis of the Public Citizen data, 26,665 arbitrations out of a total of 33,948 arbitrations were either heard or dismissed (i.e. excluding settlements). According to the analysis, of these 26,665 arbitrations, consumer parties were reported to have prevailed outright or had the case against them dismissed in 8,558 cases (32.1%). In an additional 4,376 cases (16.4%), the arbitrator did not award the full amount demanded by the business.

In March 2010, a study of the National Arbitration Forum's record of panelist appointments for domain name disputes was published. It raised concern that a small handful of the NAF's roster panelists were appointed to hear disproportionately many cases. In one instance, a single panelist was appointed to hear 949 cases, or about 10% of all NAF domain name dispute cases ever heard. In August 2012, the study was updated and it showed a continued concentration of panellists appointments wherein seven NAF-selected panelists were appointed to hear nearly half of all cases.

== Legislation and lawsuits against NAF ==
=== City of San Francisco lawsuit ===
In March 2008, the City of San Francisco filed a lawsuit against the National Arbitration Forum on behalf of its citizens, accusing the arbitrator of unfairly favoring credit card companies in disputes with their customers. The city alleged that the NAF was practicing unethically and wrongly with such specific concerns as ignoring evidence, inflating awards and declining hearing requests by consumers. The lawsuit said that between January 2003 and March 2007, consumers won 0.2% of the 18,075 arbitration cases in California that were not dropped, settled or otherwise dismissed.

=== Businessweek's allegations of bias ===
In June 2008, Businessweek made broad claims of NAF's bias in favor of consumer creditors and hidden conflict of interest. According to the article, NAF markets itself to consumer credit providers, collection agencies and law firms.

=== Minnesota Attorney General lawsuit ===
On July 14, 2009, the Minnesota Attorney General Lori Swanson brought a lawsuit against the National Arbitration Forum for consumer fraud, deceptive trade and false statements in advertising. Key to their complaint was allegations that the NAF had deliberately hidden its ties to the businesses it represented and actively encouraged their naming as mandatory arbitrators in contracts. The National Arbitration Forum countered that its arbitrators were independent practitioners, which ensured that its arbitration was impartial. However, citing legal costs, the National Arbitration Forum agreed the week after the filing to stop accepting consumer debt collection cases for arbitration. According to the Minnesota Attorney General, the National Arbitration Forum's settlement with the State of Minnesota required the company to stop handling current consumer arbitrations and to not process or administer new consumer arbitrations after July 24, 2009.

For years, National Arbitration Forum ("NAF") falsely held itself out as an independent provider of neutral arbitration services in consumer debt matters, unaffiliated with any person or entities within or outside the collection industry. However, NAF has been investigated by Minnesota local and state prosecutors for working alongside Mann Bracken authorizing illegitimate arbitration awards against consumers, deceiving the courts and the public. Both NAF and Mann Bracken concealed their relationship and the financial relationship with their common group owner known as Accretive.

== See also ==
- Arbitration
- American Arbitration Association
- Arbitration in the United States
- Alternative dispute resolution
- Dispute resolution
- Mediation
- National Academy of Arbitrators
