= WolfBlock =

Defunct American law firm

WolfBlock LLP
- Headquarters: Philadelphia, Pennsylvania
- No. of offices: 8
- No. of attorneys: approximately 317
- Major practice areas: General practice, including lobbying
- Key people: Mark L. Alderman (Executive Committee Chair)
- Revenue: $159.5M (2008)
- Date founded: 1903
- Founder: Horace Stern; Morris Wolf
- Company type: Limited liability partnership
- Dissolved: Announced dissolution 23 March 2009, by vote of partners
- Website: WolfBlock.com

WolfBlock LLP (formerly Wolf, Block, Schorr & Solis-Cohen) was a large U.S. law firm and lobbying group based in Philadelphia, Pennsylvania. The National Law Journal ranked WolfBlock the 149th-largest firm in the United States, and the 10th-largest in Philadelphia, by number of attorneys. The firm was known for being one of the oldest law firms in Philadelphia.

== History ==
WolfBlock was founded in 1903 by Horace Stern and Morris Wolf. Stern would go on to work for the United States Department of War, and would go on to serve as Chief Justice of the Pennsylvania Supreme Court. One of the firm's first major clients was the Philadelphia Rapid Transit Company, one of the predecessors of SEPTA. The firm gradually expanded, and after World War II, acquired several smaller firms, becoming a sizable regional firm. Bernard Wolfman, later Dean of the University of Pennsylvania Law School, was the managing partner of the firm from 1961 to 1963.

In 2002, the firm established a lobbying subsidiary, WolfBlock Government Relations L.P., in Harrisburg, Pennsylvania. The subsidiary was expanded into Washington D.C. the following year.

== Collapse ==
=== Failed merger attempt ===
WolfBlock's management had planned a merger with the 500+ lawyer Miami, Florida-based law firm of Akerman Senterfitt, which would have created a single 800-lawyer firm. But on August 7, 2008, the two firms released a joint statement explaining that the merger had been put on hold due to "a client conflict that cannot be discussed publicly".

=== Dissolution ===
On March 23, 2009, the firm's partners voted for an orderly unwinding and dissolution of the firm, due in part to difficulties the firm was having in continuing its line of credit with Wachovia. In a press release, the firm announced:

WolfBlock will remain in the practice of law for several months to protect the interests of its clients, employees and creditors. The decision to unwind was reached in view of a confluence of unfavorable factors: the economic recession, especially in the firm's core real estate practice; the constriction of credit occasioned by the 2008 financial crisis; and the intended and anticipated departure of significant partners and practices.

== Practice areas ==
In addition to its lobbying practice, the firm had practice groups in corporate & securities law, health law, labor and employment, employee benefits, family law, real estate & land use, environmental law, structured finance, bankruptcy and creditors' rights, tax law, estate planning, energy law, intellectual property, and construction law.

== Notable lawyers and alumni ==
- William J. Green, III, former Congressman and mayor of Philadelphia
- Howard Gittis, personal attorney for billionaire Ronald Perelman
- Michael F. Gerber, member of the Pennsylvania House of Representatives for Pennsylvania's 148th Legislative District, was an associate in the firm's Philadelphia office.
- Alan Kaplinsky
- Wendell Pritchett, Chancellor of Rutgers University–Camden, Interim Dean and Presidential Professor at the University of Pennsylvania Law School, and Provost of the University of Pennsylvania
- Jerome J. Shestack
- Horace Stern
- Faith Ryan Whittlesey, Ambassador to Switzerland and Assistant to President Ronald Reagan for Public Liaison
