= Vincent Edward Price =

President of Duke University

Vincent Price
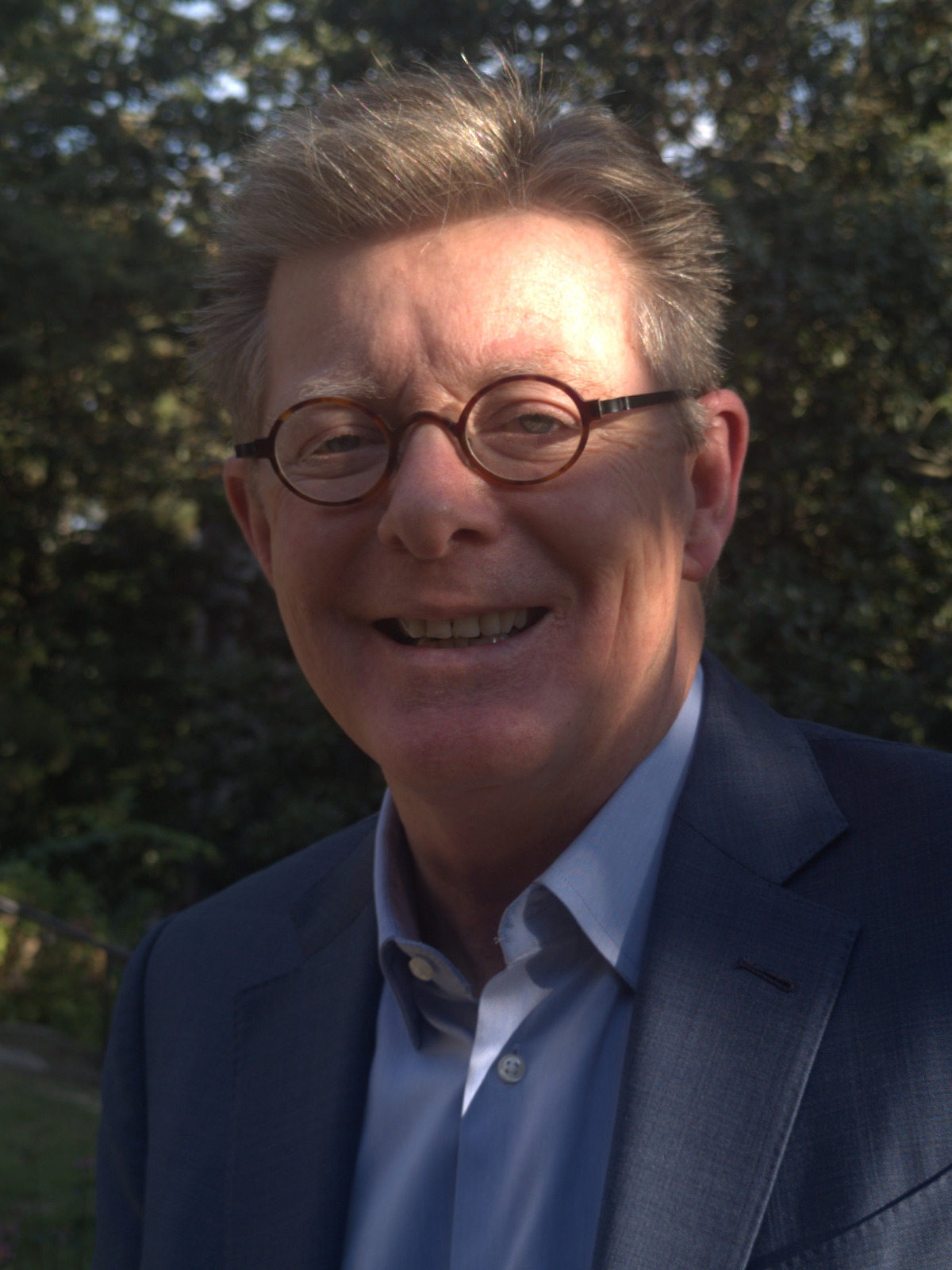
- Price in 2025

10th President of Duke University
- Incumbent
- Assumed office October 5, 2017
- Preceded by: Richard H. Brodhead

Provost of the University of Pennsylvania
- In office July 1, 2009 – June 30, 2017
- Preceded by: Ronald J. Daniels
- Succeeded by: Wendell Pritchett

Personal details
- Born: Vincent Edward Price Torrance, California, U.S.
- Education: Santa Clara University (BA); Stanford University (MA, PhD)
- Scientific career
- Fields: Mass communications
- Workplaces: University of Michigan; University of Pennsylvania; Duke University
- Thesis: Effects of communicating group conflicts of opinion: an experimental investigation (1987)

Vincent Edward Price is an American communication studies scholar who has been the 10th president of Duke University since 2017. He previously served as the provost of the University of Pennsylvania in Philadelphia from 2009 to 2017.

== Education ==
Price received a Bachelor of Arts (magna cum laude) with a major in English from Santa Clara University in California in 1979. He received a Master of Arts in communication in 1985 and a Doctor of Philosophy in communication in 1987, both from Stanford University. His doctoral dissertation was on mass communication, titled Effects of communicating group conflicts of opinion: an experimental investigation (1987).

== Career ==
=== University of Michigan ===
Price joined the Department of Communication at the University of Michigan in 1987, right after receiving his doctorate. He served as assistant professor from 1987 to 1993, as associate chair of the Department of Communication from 1991 to 1995, as faculty associate at the Center for Political Studies at the Institute for Social Research from 1987 to 1998. He was promoted to associate professor in 1993 and served as chair of the Department of Communication from 1995 to 1998, when he left for interim provostship at the University of Pennsylvania.

While at Michigan, Price wrote a book entitled Public Opinion in 1992. It was reviewed in the Public Opinion Quarterly by John P. Robinson, of the University of Maryland, College Park, who called it an "indispensable and insightful guide to the historical and intellectual roots of our profession". The book is 92 pages long and examines and contrasts the ideas of Plato, John Locke and Walter Lippmann with current laboratory findings of group dynamics and cognitive psychology. The book examines a lack of consensus on the definition of "public opinion". Robinson wrote that, "The work establishes Price as a major contributor to a field that has yet to address adequately many of the fundamental issues that he has articulated."

=== University of Pennsylvania ===
At the University of Pennsylvania, he held the positions of interim provost, associate provost for faculty affairs, chair of the Faculty Senate, and associate dean of the Annenberg School for Communication at the University of Pennsylvania. Price served as the editor-in-chief of the Public Opinion Quarterly from 1997 to 2001.

=== Duke University ===
Price was announced as the 10th president of Duke University on December 2, 2016, and he assumed office on October 5, 2017. He was reappointed to another five-year term in 2021. Since 2017, Price has served as a trustee of the National Humanities Center at Research Triangle Park.

== Personal life ==
Price is married and has two children.

== Awards and honors ==
- The International Communication Association's K. Kyoon Hur Dissertation Award.
- The American Association in Journalism and Mass Communication's Nafziger-White Dissertation Award.
- The University of Michigan College of Literature, Science, and the Arts' Excellence in Education Award.
- The World Association for Public Opinion Research's Robert M. Worcester Award.
- The American Association for Public Opinion Research's Award of Recognition.
