= Howard Gittis =

American lawyer

- Born: February 16, 1934; Philadelphia, Pennsylvania
- Died: September 17, 2007 (aged 73); New York, New York
- Occupation: Attorney

Howard Gittis (February 16, 1934 – September 17, 2007) was an American attorney known for being a longtime adviser to Ronald Perelman and an adviser to the mayor of Philadelphia, Frank Rizzo.

== Biography ==
Gittis was born in Philadelphia, Pennsylvania. He graduated from Philadelphia's Central High School and earned his economics and law degrees from the University of Pennsylvania. He served in the U.S. Air Force at an Illinois airbase. After his military duty, he accepted a job offer from Tom McBride who had just been elected to the Pennsylvania Supreme Court. McBride lost his subsequent election, leading McBride to found his namesake law firm and keep Gittis by his side. This led to a merger with Wolf, Block, Schorr & Solis-Cohen where Gittis eventually became managing partner. Gittis worked at Wolf Block for 25 years. He continued in a consulting capacity to Wolf Block for a few years after he relocated to New York with MacAndrews & Forbes, a holding company owned by Ronald Perelman.

Gittis and Perelman first met in the 1970s. Gittis became Perelman's trusted adviser and friend. Gittis also acted as an adviser for the politician Frank Rizzo, whom he successfully defended from an attempted recall. In 1985, Gittis was recognized by the National Law Journal as one of the top 100 attorneys in the country.

== Family ==
Gittis, the son of Russian immigrants, was the first in his family to go to college. He married twice and had four daughters.

== Death ==
Gittis died in his sleep at his Manhattan home on September 16, 2007, from heart failure.
