= Discover Bank v. Superior Court =

- Supreme Court of California

Decided June 27, 2005
- Full case name: Discover Bank v. Superior Court of Los Angeles; Christopher Boehr, Real Party in Interest
- Citation(s): 36 Cal. 4th 148, 113 P.3d 1100

Holding
- An arbitration agreement with a class-action waiver was unenforceable on the grounds of unconscionability

Court membership
- Chief Justice: Ronald M. George
- Associate Justices: Marvin R. Baxter, Janice Rogers Brown, Ming Chin, Joyce L. Kennard, Carlos R. Moreno, Kathryn Werdegar

Case opinions
- Majority: Moreno, joined by George, Kennard, Werdegar
- Concur/dissent: Baxter, joined by Chin, Brown

Laws applied
- Federal Arbitration Act, California Civil Code §1668
- Overruled by
- AT&T Mobility LLC v. Concepcion

Discover Bank v. Superior Court, 36 Cal. 4th 148 (2005), is a case where the California Supreme Court ruled that an arbitration clause was unenforceable because a class-action waiver contained within it would exculpate Discover Bank from liability for wrongdoing involving small sums of damages.

== Background ==
The Discover Card cardholder agreement required any disputes be handled through an arbitration agreement. The company was accused of miscalculating late fees that would be very small dollar amounts for individual consumers but, in the aggregate, would be a large sum of money. The arbitration itself was not disputed but class action status was requested and denied by the company, based on Delaware law. The Superior Court certified the group under California law. Discover then appealed that decision.

== Decision ==
Carlos R. Moreno, in the majority opinion, stated the Discover Bank test to determine whether a class-action waiver is unenforceable. Under the Discover Bank test, a class-action waiver will be unenforceable under California law when it appears in a "consumer contract of adhesion", when the disputes "predictably involve small amounts of damages", and where the plaintiff alleges that "the party with the superior bargaining power has carried out a scheme to deliberately cheat large numbers of consumers out of individually small sums of money".

The United States Supreme Court held that the test used in Discover Bank was preempted by the Federal Arbitration Act in a 5–4 decision in the 2011 case AT&T Mobility v. Concepcion. Accordingly, Discover Bank is no longer good law.
