= Equal Pay Day =

Symbolic day dedicated to raising awareness of the gender pay gap

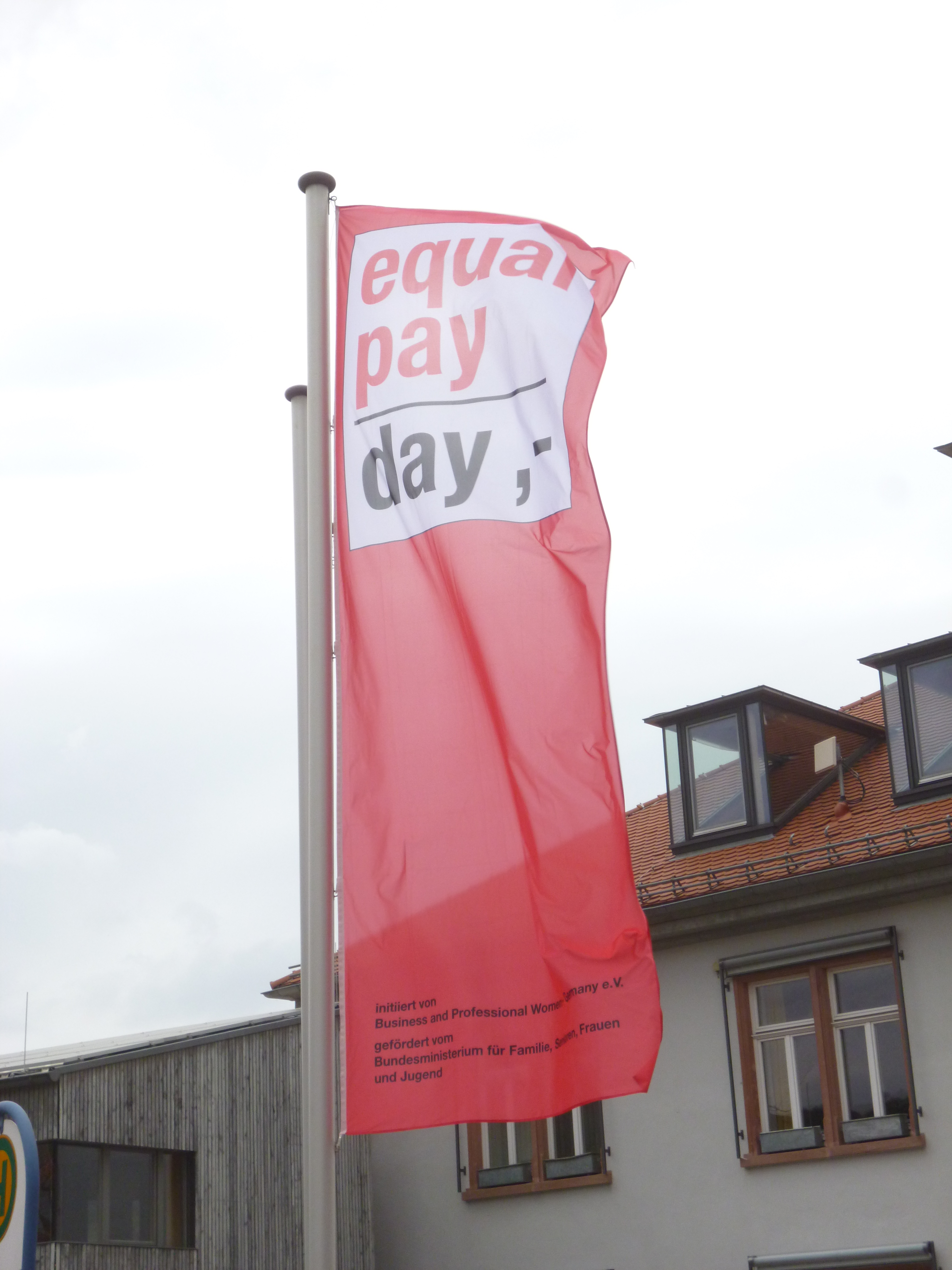
Equal Pay Day flag flying on March 21, 2014, in Alsbach, Germany.

Equal Pay Day is the symbolic day dedicated to raising awareness of the gender pay gap. This date symbolizes how far into the current year the median woman must work in order to achieve earnings, cumulative with the previous year, equal to what the median man had earned in the previous year alone. The exact day differs year by year. In 2022, it was March 15 in the United States and November 14 in the Netherlands. On average, women earn $0.82 for every dollar men earned in 2019.

== Background ==
The initiated was started by the Business and Professional Women's Foundation.

The symbolic day was first observed in 1996 by the National Committee on Pay Equity, a coalition of women's and civil rights organizations, labor unions, professional associations and individuals working to eliminate sex and race based wage discrimination and to achieve pay equity.

The goals of Equal Pay day are:

- To provide information about the reasons for pay inequality.
- To inform on equal pay and to raise awareness on the problem of unequal pay.
- To provide a platform to share knowledge about equal pay and the equal pay day campaigns.
- To create awareness of the problem.
- To provide and create multipliers and supporters with helpful information.
- Identify implementation strategies for closing the wage gap.
- Close the gender pay gap.
- To show strategies on how to close the gender pay gap.
- To push towards the closure of the gender pay gap.

== Observance ==
=== Australia ===
In 2018, Equal Pay Day fell on August 31. The date was specifically chosen to represent the additional 62 days from the end of the previous financial year that women have to work to earn the same as men.

=== Czech Republic ===
The date on which Equal Pay Day is observed is different in every country due to differing formulas for observing the day and also due to different wage gaps. For example, Equal Pay Day in Czech Republic is observed each year as a major two-day event involving over 2,000 people with an extensive educational program.

=== European Union ===
Logo of European Commission for Equal Pay Day.

According to the European Commission direct discrimination either does not cause any gender wage differences or only explains a small part of it.

The European Commission, the European Union's executive arm, observes Equal Pay Day based on the average gap across the bloc. Based on 2016 figures, that difference was 16%. In 2022 Equal Pay Day was on 15 November, based on a gap of 13%.

=== Germany ===
Equal Pay Day is more widely observed in Germany than it is elsewhere. For example, the online presence is far greater, such as the Equal Pay Day Wiki, the de:Equal Pay Day page on the German Wikipedia and the Equal Pay Day informational site. An interesting thing to note about Equal Pay Day in Germany is that it falls on different days than it does in the United States, because the wage gap in Germany is different and also because the formula used to calculate the Equal Pay Day date is different. Whereas in 2016 Equal Pay Date in the United States was observed on April 12, in Germany it was observed on March 19.

In Germany, Equal Pay Day also helped inspire the creation of Equal Care Day, a symbolic event dedicated to creating awareness of the lack of appreciation and unfair distribution of care work in society.

=== The Netherlands ===
The first Equal Pay Day in The Netherlands took place on October 24, 2006. In 2022, the day was on November 14. In 2021, the average salary gap was 13%.

=== United Kingdom ===
In the United Kingdom, Equal Pay Day marks the day in the year when women effectively stop earning until the following year. In 2018, that was November 10 and the gap has similar demographic trends to the United States, in that, Black, Asian and Minority Ethnic (BAME) women are paid less on average than white women.

=== United Nations ===
The United Nations first celebrated Equal Pay Day September 18, 2020. They estimate that women earn 23 percent less than men globally.

=== United States ===
In the United States, the average wage gap for women also varies by demographic and therefore also has different dates to recognize how far into the year an average woman of color needs to work to earn what the average man earned in the previous year without accounting for job type, education, etc. In 2019, compared to each $1 earned by a white, non-Hispanic man, on average:

- Asian-American women earned $0.85, so their equal pay day was March 5;
- African American women earned $0.61, so their equal pay day was August 22;
- Native American women earned $0.58, so their equal pay day was September 23;
- Latinas earned $0.53, so their equal pay day was November 20.

On average, in 2018 mothers earned $0.69 for each $1 earned by fathers, so in 2019 their equal pay day was June 10.

==== Legislation ====
The debate for equal pay in the United States has been going on for centuries. Several laws have been passed in order to further support the idea of equal pay no matter the gender.

In 1963, John F. Kennedy signed the Equal Pay Act into effect, calling it a "significant step forward" for women in the workforce. The Civil Rights Act of 1964 prohibited discrimination on the basis of race, origin, color, religion, or sex. The Pregnancy Discrimination Act of 1978 protected pregnant employees, and the Family and Medical Leave Act of 1993 allowed parents regardless of gender to take time off. President Barack Obama signed the Lilly Ledbetter Fair Pay Act, which restores some protections against discrimination that had been stripped in a 2007 Supreme Court case, gave incentives to employers to make their payrolls fairer.

===== Equal Pay Act =====
Congressional representative Terri Sewell speaks about Equal Pay Day in 2018.

The Equal Pay Act requires that men and women be given equal pay for equal work in the same establishment. The jobs need not be identical, but they must be substantially equal. It is job content, not job titles, that determines whether jobs are substantially equal. Specifically, the EPA provides that employers may not pay unequal wages to men and women who perform jobs that require substantially equal skill, effort and responsibility, and that are performed under similar working conditions within the same establishment. Each of these factors is summarized below:

- Skill: Measured by factors such as the experience, ability, education, and training required to perform the job. The issue is what skills are required for the job, not what skills the individual employees may have. For example, two bookkeeping jobs could be considered equal under the EPA even if one of the job holders has a master's degree in physics, since that degree would not be required for the job.
- Effort: The amount of physical or mental exertion needed to perform the job. For example, suppose that men and women work side by side on a line assembling machine parts. The person at the end of the line must also lift the assembled product as he or she completes the work and place it on a board. That job requires more effort than the other assembly line jobs if the extra effort of lifting the assembled product off the line is substantial and is a regular part of the job. As a result, it would not be a violation to pay that person more, regardless of whether the job is held by a man or a woman.
- Responsibility: The degree of accountability required in performing the job. For example, a salesperson who is delegated the duty of determining whether to accept customers' personal checks has more responsibility than other salespeople. On the other hand, a minor difference in responsibility, such as turning out the lights at the end of the day, would not justify a pay differential.
- Working conditions: This encompasses two factors: (1) physical surroundings like temperature, fumes, and ventilation; and (2) hazards.
- Establishment: The prohibition against compensation discrimination under the EPA applies only to jobs within an establishment. An establishment is a distinct physical place of business rather than an entire business or enterprise consisting of several places of business. In some circumstances, physically separate places of business may be treated as one establishment. For example, if a central administrative unit hires employees, sets their compensation, and assigns them to separate work locations, the separate work sites can be considered part of one establishment.

Pay differentials are permitted when they are based on seniority, merit, quantity or quality of production, or a factor other than sex. These are known as "affirmative defenses" and it is the employer's burden to prove that they apply.

In correcting a pay differential, no employee's pay may be reduced. Instead, the pay of the lower paid employee(s) must be increased.

The gender pay gap, although the gap is shrinking greatly as evidenced by EEOC data is defined as the average difference between men's and women's aggregate hourly earnings. The wage gap is due to a variety of causes, such as differences in education choices, differences in preferred job and industry, differences in the types of positions held by men and women, differences in the type of jobs men typically go into as opposed to women (especially highly paid high risk jobs), differences in amount of work experience, difference in length of the work week, and breaks in employment. These factors resolve 60% to 75% of the pay gap, depending on the source. Various explanations for the remaining 25% to 40% have been suggested, including women's lower willingness and ability to negotiate salaries and discrimination.

== See also ==
- Equal pay for equal work
- Gender inequality
- Gender pay gap
- Glass ceiling
- Intersectionality
- Social construction of gender
