= Arbitration clause =

Contract clause requiring parties to resolve disputes via arbitration

In contract law, an arbitration clause is a clause in a contract that requires the parties to resolve their disputes through an arbitration process. Although such a clause may or may not specify that arbitration occur within a specific jurisdiction, it always binds the parties to a type of resolution outside the courts, and is therefore considered a kind of forum selection clause.

Arbitration clauses are frequently paired with class action waivers, which prevent contracting parties to file class action lawsuits against each other. In the United States, arbitration clauses also often include a provision which requires parties to waive their rights to a jury trial. All three provisions have attained significant amounts of support and controversy, with proponents arguing that arbitration is as fair as courts and a more informal, speedier way to resolve disputes, while opponents of arbitration condemn the clauses for giving limited appeal options and allowing large corporations to effectively silence claims through "private justice".

== Use and enforceability by country ==
=== Brazil ===
Brazil has been very slow to adopt arbitration as its courts often refuse to enforce agreements to arbitrate, especially prior to the passage of Brazilian law number 9.307 (amended by Law No. 13.129 in 2017), the Brazilian Arbitration Act, which was passed in 1996, today considered to be the fundamental law for arbitration within Brazil. Since its passage, though, Brazilian courts have been more willing to enforce agreements to arbitrate, though precedent only stipulates that courts can compel arbitration in disputes involving what the law refers to as "arbitrable patrimonial rights", presumed to relate only to tangible and intangible property disputes. Brazil also requires all arbitrators to refer non-arbitrable disputes to the competent court. Brazil further restricts all arbitration proceedings to be decided by an odd number of arbitrators.

=== Canada ===
All provinces except for Quebec have adopted an arbitration code similar to the United Nations Commission on International Trade Law's Model Law. Quebec has opted instead to require that arbitrations would be subject to the province's own Civil Code, including Quebec's Code of Civil Procedure. Arbitration in Canada is primarily administered by the ADR Institute of Canada and the British Columbia International Commercial Arbitration Centre.

Class action waivers lack a uniform policy across Canada, as the Supreme Court of Canada has found that provincial legislation governed disputes, though in Seidel v. TELUS Communications, the court found that because a class action waiver was attached to an invalid arbitration agreement, the class action waiver was void. The province of Ontario, per the Consumer Protection Act of 2002, has banned class action waivers. A court of appeals in British Columbia also found that class action waivers were unenforceable and unconscionable in Pearce v. 4 Pillars Consulting Group due to the contract in question being a standard form contract written by 4 Pillars and giving little bargaining power to Pearce.

In Uber Technologies Inc v Heller (2020), the Supreme Court found an arbitration clause requiring a gig worker to litigate before the Dutch International Chamber of Commerce void due to unconscionability.

=== Mainland China ===
China allows arbitration clauses to exist, though the Supreme People's Court has found that an arbitration clause that does not specify an "arbitral commission" is invalid and unenforceable. An agreement to arbitrate in China, in addition to specifying a commission, must contain a declared intent to arbitrate as well as name the disputes to be arbitrated in order to be enforceable. In the event that one party questions the validity of an arbitration agreement and requests that a PRC court to determine the validity of the agreement, the court shall determine the validity of the agreement.

=== France ===
French law generally supports arbitration, though declares that capacity, marriage and divorce cannot be arbitrated.

=== Germany ===
German law excludes disputes over the rental of living space from any form of arbitration, while arbitration agreements with consumers are only considered valid if they are signed, and if the signed document does not bear any other content than the arbitration agreement.

=== England and Wales ===
In England and Wales it is not possible for parties to a contract to prevent courts from exercising their jurisdiction over contact disputes, but through what is known as a Scott v. Avery clause they may require that a dispute be adjudicated by an arbitrator before submitting the matter to a court.

=== Poland ===
Under Polish law, an arbitration clause (zapis na sąd polubowny), governed by the Polish Code of Civil Procedure is a written agreement between parties to submit a specific dispute or disputes arising from a defined legal relationship -existing or future - to arbitration, thereby excluding the jurisdiction of state courts within that scope. The agreement must precisely identify either the subject matter of the dispute or the legal relationship from which the dispute has arisen or may arise. As a distinct, typically bilateral legal act, separate from the main contract, it has both procedural and substantive legal effects and is interpreted strictly. No implied terms or supplementation by witness evidence are allowed. Arbitrability under Polish law is defined relatively broadly. An arbitration agreement may be concluded in disputes concerning property rights and non-property rights, provided that the latter may be the subject of a judicial settlement.

=== United Arab Emirates ===
The United Arab Emirates generally supports arbitration clauses. The federation of kingdoms, however, poses limitations on their enforceability depending on the actions of the parties, and the UAE's courts have ruled that parties which engage in court proceedings waive their right to compel arbitration.

=== United States ===
The federal government has explicitly allowed arbitration clauses. The relevant law is found in the Federal Arbitration Act, which permits compulsory and binding arbitration, under which parties give up the right to appeal an arbitrator's decision to a court. Historically, arbitration in the United States in the employment context was primarily used for disputes between unions and employers. Starting in 1991 with the Gilmer decision this changed dramatically, expanding from 2.1 percent of the employers subject to mandatory arbitration clauses in 1992 to 53.9% in 2017.

In 2022, the U.S. Congress passed the Ending Forced Arbitration of Sexual Assault and Sexual Harassment Act (EFASASHA), which excludes these types of complaints from arbitration clauses, including retroactively. Congress also included a ban on class action waivers for claims covered under the act.

== Fairness ==
The use of arbitration clauses has been criticized for its unfairness. In the US in 2020, workers who challenged their employers through forced arbitration won their cases just 1.6 percent of the time. This prompted members of the United States' Democratic Party to present bills limiting the scope of arbitration clauses, most notably the Forced Arbitration Injustice Repeal Act (which has yet to pass) and the Ending Forced Arbitration of Sexual Assault and Sexual Harassment Act of 2021 (EFASASHA), which was signed into law in 2022 by president Joe Biden.

== Contractual language ==
A number of international arbitration bodies provide sample arbitration clauses for parties to use. Examples of these are:

- The Chartered Institute of Arbitrators:
  Any dispute or difference arising out of or in connection with this contract shall be determined by the appointment of a single arbitrator to be agreed between the parties, or failing agreement within fourteen days, after either party has given to the other a written request to concur in the appointment of an arbitrator, by an arbitrator to be appointed by the President or a Vice President of the Chartered Institute of Arbitrators.
- The London Court of International Arbitration:
  Any dispute arising out of or in connection with this contract, including any question regarding its existence, validity or termination, shall be referred to and finally resolved by arbitration under the LCIA Rules, which Rules are deemed to be incorporated by reference into this clause.
  The number of arbitrators shall be [one/three].
  The seat, or legal place, of arbitration shall be [insert city or country].
  The language to be used in the arbitral proceedings shall be [insert language].
  The governing law of the contract shall be the substantive law of [insert governing law].
- The International Court of Arbitration:
  All disputes arising out of or in connection with the present contract shall be finally settled under the Rules of Arbitration of the International Chamber of Commerce by one or more arbitrators appointed in accordance with the said Rules.
- The American Arbitration Association:
  Any controversy or claim arising out of or relating to this contract, or the breach thereof, shall be settled by arbitration administered by the American Arbitration Association in accordance with its Commercial [or other] Arbitration Rules, and judgment on the award rendered by the arbitrator(s) may be entered in any court having jurisdiction thereof.
- JAMS:
  Any dispute, claim or controversy arising out of or relating to this Agreement or the breach, termination, enforcement, interpretation or validity thereof, including the determination of the scope or applicability of this agreement to arbitrate, shall be determined by arbitration in [insert the desired place of arbitration] before [one/three] arbitrator(s). The arbitration shall be administered by JAMS pursuant to its Comprehensive Arbitration Rules and Procedures [and in accordance with the Expedited Procedures in those Rules] [or pursuant to JAMS' Streamlined Arbitration Rules and Procedures]. Judgment on the Award may be entered in any court having jurisdiction. This clause shall not preclude parties from seeking provisional remedies in aid of arbitration from a court of appropriate jurisdiction.

In keeping with the informality of the arbitration process, the law in England and Wales is generally keen to uphold the validity of arbitration clauses even when they lack the normal formal language associated with legal contracts. Clauses which have been upheld include:

- "arbitration in London – English law to apply"
- "suitable arbitration clause"
- "arbitration, if any, by ICC Rules in London"

Courts in England and Wales have also upheld clauses which specify resolution of disputes other than in accordance with a specific legal system. These include provision indicating:

- that the arbitrators "must not necessarily judge according to the strict law but as a general rule ought chiefly to consider the principles of practical business"
- "internationally accepted principles of law governing contractual relations"

== See also ==
- Arbitration in the United States
- Class action waiver
- Epic Systems Corp. v. Lewis, a United States Supreme Court case that considers whether arbitration clauses are legal under the National Labor Relations Act
