= Ballard Spahr =

American law firm

Ballard Spahr LLP
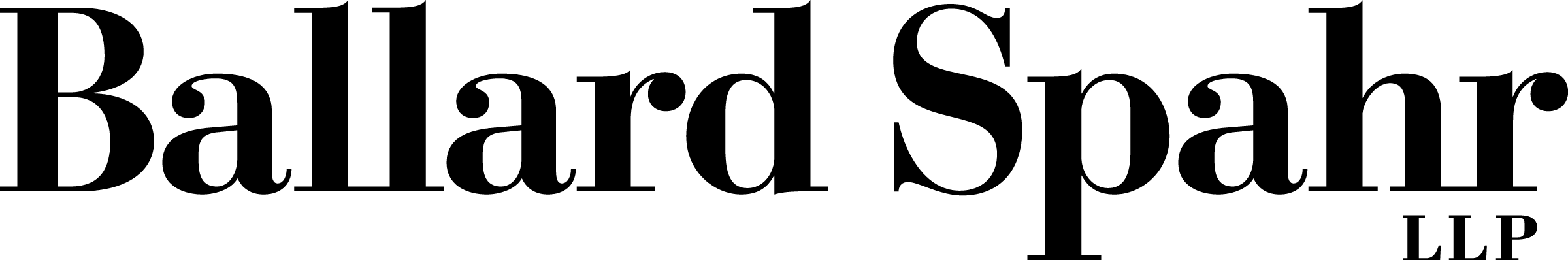
- Headquarters: Philadelphia, Pennsylvania
- No. of offices: 18 offices
- No. of attorneys: More than 700
- Major practice areas: Real Estate, Intellectual Property, Business and Transactions, Litigation, Finance
- Key people: Peter V. Michaud, Chair
- Revenue: ▲484 million USD (2024)
- Date founded: 1885; 140 years ago
- Company type: Limited Liability Partnership
- Website: www.ballardspahr.com

Ballard Spahr LLP is an AmLaw 100 law firm practicing throughout the United States. Founded in 1885, the law firm focuses on litigation, securities and regulatory enforcement, business and finance, intellectual property, public finance, and real estate matters. The firm is headquartered at 1735 Market Street in Philadelphia.

== History ==
Ballard Spahr originated in Philadelphia in 1885 and became known as 'Ballard and Spahr' in the early 1900s when University of Pennsylvania alumni Ellis Ames Ballard and Boyd Lee Spahr began practicing law together. The firm has continually grown by number of attorneys, practices, and offices throughout the United States since inception.

The firm opened its first office outside of Philadelphia in 1978, with the opening of its Washington, D.C. office. Ballard opened its Denver office in 1981, beginning the firm's growth in the Rocky Mountain and Southwest regions. The firm opened offices in Salt Lake City in 1987, Baltimore and New Jersey in 1992, and Delaware in 2002.

Ballard Spahr acquired Needle & Rosenberg, P.C., an intellectual property boutique firm in Atlanta in 2008, expanding the firm's IP services and expanding to the Southeast. The firm opened an office in New York City in 2013, joining with Stillman & Friedman, a white collar defense and securities litigation and enforcement boutique.

It has also acquired First Amendment litigation boutique Levine Sullivan Koch & Schulz in 2017, bolstering Ballard's national media and entertainment law practice, as well as Lindquist & Vennum, a firm that focused on middle-market deal making.

On January 1, 2025, Ballard Spahr completed its merger with another law firm Lane Powell.

== Practice areas ==
Ballard Spahr is a general practice law firm with 51 practice groups and departments focusing on business and transactions, finance, intellectual property, litigation, and real estate. Litigators at the firm advise market players in securities and antitrust class actions, patent infringement cases, white collar defense matters, and federal and state appeals.

The firm has a large real estate practice in the United States, encompassing real estate finance, conveyancing, construction, development, and distressed assets. It also has a significant presence in mergers and acquisitions, securities and securities enforcement, and other areas of corporate law.

The company has also represented government entities in the issuance of municipal bonds and other tax-exempt instruments. It also practices in the areas of labor & employment, insurance law, environmental law, tax law and other related sub-disciplines.

== See also ==
- White-shoe firms
