= Forced Arbitration Injustice Repeal Act =

Proposed law banning most pre-dispute binding arbitration agreements

FAIR Act of 2023
- Long title: To amend title 9 of the United States Code with respect to arbitration.
- Announced in: the 118th United States Congress
- Number of co-sponsors: 101

Legislative history
- Introduced in the House as H.R.2953 by Hank Johnson (D–GA) on April 27, 2023; Committee consideration by United States House Committee on the Judiciary, United States Senate Committee on the Judiciary

The Forced Arbitration Injustice Repeal (FAIR) Act is proposed legislation in the US Congress. The comprehensive legislation would prohibit pre-dispute, forced arbitration agreements from being valid or enforceable if it requires forced arbitration of an employment, consumer, or civil rights claim against a corporation.

The bill was introduced in the 116th Congress as H.R. 1423 and S. 610. The bill's sponsors include Representative Hank Johnson (D-GA) and Senator Richard Blumenthal (D-CT). Similar versions of this bill were previously introduced in the 115th United States Congress as H.R. 1374 and S. 2591. The FAIR Act passed the House of Representatives on September 20, 2019, by a vote of 225 to 186.

Blumenthal re-introduced the FAIR Act in the 117th Congress due to the FAIR Act not passing the Senate in the 116th Congress. The Senate version of the bill, S.505, has 39 cosponsors, all of them being Democrats.

== Background ==
Forced arbitration clauses are commonly found in contracts between individuals and businesses. In cases where individuals bring legal claims against their employer or a business, forced arbitration clauses generally prohibit them taking such claims to court and instead substitute closed-door arbitration proceedings, where they are less likely to receive an impartial hearing.

Some employers have removed provisions from contracts subjecting their employees to forced arbitration amid public pressure regarding concerns that the practice inhibits the rights of workers to hold their employer accountable for allegations of sexual harassment, discrimination, and wage theft. In November 2018, over 20,000 employees of the technology giant Google organized a walkout protest against the company in response to Google's policies around "equity and transparency in the workplace", which includes forced arbitration in worker contracts. In February 2019, Google announced they were ending their policy of forced arbitration for full-time employees.

== Content ==
The FAIR Act defines arbitration clauses as "pre-dispute arbitration agreements" and aims to broadly end arbitration agreements for both consumers and employees. The act is planned as an amendment to the Title 9 of the United States Code, under which the new regulations would become Chapter 4.

Section 402, titled "No validity or enforceability", bans predispute arbitration agreements, as well as any predispute class action waivers in disputes regarding employment, trusts, civil rights, and/or in the sale of property and/or the usage of a service. The bill does not apply to contracts between employers and labor organizations, or between labor organizations, except if the provisions of the contract deprives workers of the right to seek judicial enforcement.

The act additionally amends Title 9 in the phrasings in section 1, 2, 208, and 307 to avoid conflict between sections and the new Chapter 4.

== Legislative history ==
As of March 1, 2025

Congress	Short title	Bill number(s)	Date introduced	Sponsor(s)	# of cosponsors	Latest status
115th Congress	Arbitration Fairness Act of 2017	H.R. 1374	March 7, 2017	Hank Johnson (D-GA)	82	Died in committee.
115th Congress	Arbitration Fairness Act of 2017	S. 2591	March 7, 2017	Richard Blumenthal (D-CT)	32	Died in committee.
115th Congress	Arbitration Fairness Act of 2018	S.537	March 7, 2017	Al Franken (D-MN)	26	Died in committee.
116th Congress	FAIR Act	H.R. 1423	February 28, 2019	Hank Johnson (D-GA)	222	Passed in the House.
116th Congress	Forced Arbitration Injustice Repeal Act	S. 610	February 28, 2019	Richard Blumenthal(D-CT)	38	Died in committee.
117th Congress	FAIR Act of 2022	H.R.963	February 11, 2021	Hank Johnson (D-GA)	203	Passed in the House.
117th Congress	Forced Arbitration Injustice Repeal Act	S.505	March 1, 2021	Richard Blumenthal(D-CT)	39	Died in committee.
118th Congress	FAIR Act of 2023	H.R.2953	April 27, 2023	Hank Johnson (D-GA)	101	Died in committee.
118th Congress	Forced Arbitration Injustice Repeal Act	S.1376	April 27, 2023	Richard Blumenthal(D-CT)	39	Died in committee.
