= JAMS (organization) =

American arbitrator association

- Formerly: Judicial Arbitration and Mediation Services
- Type: Private, Multinational
- Industry: Alternative Dispute Resolution (ADR), Arbitration, Mediation
- Founder: Hon. H. Warren Knight (Ret.)
- Headquarters: Irvine, California, United States
- Area served: Worldwide
- Website: jamsadr.com

JAMS, formerly known as Judicial Arbitration and Mediation Services, Inc. is a United States–based for-profit organization of alternative dispute resolution (ADR) services, including mediation and arbitration. H. Warren Knight, a former California Superior Court judge, founded JAMS in 1979 in Santa Ana, California. A 1994 merger with Endispute of Washington, D.C. made JAMS into the largest private arbitration and mediation service in the country. It is one of the major arbitration administration organizations in the United States. (Note: A 2008 BusinessWeek article described JAMS and the American Arbitration Association as the main competitors of the National Arbitration Forum in the field of arbitration. The Consumer Financial Protection Bureau's preliminary study on arbitration stated that there was consensus that JAMS and the American Arbitration Association were the leading arbitration administration organizations in the United States.) As of 2026, JAMS has 29 resolution centers, including its headquarters in Irvine, California and centers in Toronto and London. JAMS specializes in mediating and arbitrating complex, multi-party, business/commercial cases.

As of 2012, JAMS administers a few hundred consumer arbitration cases per year. JAMS's Consumer Minimum Standards have been the subject of scholarly commentary. A policy promulgated by JAMS in 2004 that would have allowed for class arbitrations, even if the arbitration agreement did not allow them, and the subsequent retraction of that policy, were also controversial.
