= Australian Consumer Law =

The Australian Consumer Law (ACL), being Schedule 2 to the Competition and Consumer Act 2010, is uniform legislation for consumer protection, applying as a law of the Commonwealth of Australia and is incorporated into the law of each of Australia's states and territories. The law commenced on 1 January 2011, replacing 20 different consumer laws across the Commonwealth and the states and territories, although certain other Acts continue to be in force.

== History ==
The Australian Consumer Law was developed by agreement of the Council of Australian Governments.

The Competition and Consumer Act 2010 (referred to as Australian Consumer Law) was enacted into legislation by the Parliament of Australia to provide a more robust framework of protection for consumer transactions within Australia. Historically the States and Territories of Australia were responsible for their own legislation protecting the sale of goods, known as the Trade Practices Act 1974, where the Australian Consumer Law expands on provisions of the fair trading legislation in each state and territory to a national legislation covering the provision of goods and services, of a consumer based nature, within Australia.

== Scope ==
The ACL has a broad definition as to who is a "consumer", and it includes anyone who acquires:

- goods or services that are priced at less than $100,000, or
- goods or services of a kind ordinarily acquired for personal, domestic or household use or consumption (even if priced greater than $100,000), or
- a vehicle or trailer for use principally in the transport of goods on public roads.

A person is still defined as a "consumer" if the good was acquired for purposes of re-supply or for the purpose of using or transforming it in trade or commerce. It accordingly extends protections relating to business behaviour, product safety and quality to businesses and farms with regard to the areas covered above.

Certain provisions possess different scope in their application:

- Unfair terms are void, where they appear in standard form contracts signed with individuals "whose acquisition of the goods, services or interest is wholly or predominantly for personal, domestic or household use or consumption."
- All persons are prohibited from engaging in unconscionable conduct (beyond unfair terms in standard form consumer contracts) when dealing with persons (other than public listed companies) in the course of trade and commerce.

These provisions are vigorously enforced. In December 2014, the Federal Court of Australia, on the application of the ACCC, issued an A$10 million pecuniary penalty order against Coles Supermarkets in relation to two connected proceedings arising from payment demands by Coles to which it was not entitled by threatening harm to the suppliers that did not comply with such demands. In December 2021, the Federal Court found that the ACL prohibits class action waivers. In October 2024, the Federal Court ordered Qantas to pay A$100 million in penalties after the airline admitted misleading consumers between May 2021 and August 2023 by continuing to sell tickets on flights it had already decided to cancel and by not promptly telling existing ticket holders of cancellations. The penalty was jointly proposed by the ACCC and Qantas, which also gave a court-enforceable undertaking under section 87B of the Competition and Consumer Act 2010 to pay about A$20 million to affected consumers.

== Administration ==
The ACL is administered and enforced jointly by the Australian Competition and Consumer Commission and the state and territory consumer protection agencies, with the involvement of Australian Securities and Investments Commission on financial services matters.

The following matters are regulated federally, by virtue of the corporations power:

- the conduct of corporations;
- a supply or possible supply of goods or services by any person to a corporation (other than a listed public company); or
- an acquisition or possible acquisition of goods or services from any person by a corporation (other than a listed public company).

Federal jurisdiction also extends to conduct outside Australia by bodies corporate incorporated or carrying on business in Australia, Australian citizens, and persons ordinarily resident in Australia.

All other matters subject to the ACL are handled by the States.

Implementing identical consumer protection laws at Commonwealth and state/territory levels promotes consistency between jurisdictions. It will also make it easier for the Federal Parliament to amend the provisions which will then be reflected in the laws of the states and territories without the parliaments of each jurisdiction needing to debate and enact the amendments separately, although the states and territories reserve the right not to implement any amendments within their own jurisdiction.

== List of implementing acts ==
ACL implementation by jurisdiction
Jurisdiction	Implementing Act
Australia	Competition and Consumer Act 2010 (Cth)
Australian Capital Territory	Fair Trading (Australian Consumer Law) 1992 (ACT)
New South Wales	Fair Trading Act 1987 (NSW)
Northern Territory	Consumer Affairs and Fair Trading Act (NT)
Queensland	Fair Trading Act 1989 (Qld)
South Australia	Fair Trading Act 1987 (SA)
Tasmania	Australian Consumer Law (Tasmania) Act 2010 (Tas)
Victoria	Australian Consumer Law and Fair Trading Act 2012 (Vic)
Western Australia	Fair Trading Act 2010 (WA)
