= American Arbitration Association =

Alternate dispute resolution administerer

- Predecessor: Arbitration Society of America; Arbitration Foundation
- Formation: 1926; 100 years ago
- Headquarters: Equitable Building, New York City, New York
- Location: United States
- Website: www.adr.org

The American Arbitration Association (AAA) is an organization focused in the field of alternative dispute resolution, one of several arbitration organizations that administers arbitration proceedings. Structured as a non-profit, the AAA also administers mediation and other forms of alternative dispute resolution. It is headquartered at the Equitable Building in New York City.

The AAA also administers the International Centre for Dispute Resolution (ICDR), established in 1996 and oversees international arbitration proceedings initiated under the AAA's rules. As of 2018, the ICDR has offices in New York City, Mexico City, Singapore, and Bahrain.

== History ==
The AAA was founded in 1926 by the merger of the Arbitration Society of America and the Arbitration Foundation to provide dispute resolution and avoid civil court proceedings.

In July 2009, the AAA stopped accepting consumer debt collection cases, after the National Arbitration Forum was forced to do so after questions arose about the fairness of its process.

In May 2025, the AAA was sued in federal court for being an illegal monopoly in regards to arbitration in the United States. The plaintiff, Stephanie Stephens, filed the complaint in the US District Court of Arizona.

== See also ==
- Arbitration in the United States
- Federal Mediation and Conciliation Service
- International arbitration
- JAMS (organization)
- London Court of International Arbitration
- International Chamber of Commerce
- National Academy of Arbitrators
