= Jammu and Kashmir International Arbitration Centre =

International commercial arbitrator

Jammu and Kashmir International Arbitration Centre (JKIAC) is an autonomous institution formed as system for alternate dispute resolution and act as arbitrator or mediator in case of international commercial transactions. The channel helps in enforcing the right of individuals under segment 89 of Civil Procedure Code, 1908 to exercise right for out of court settlement in case such possibility exists.

== Objective ==
Jammu and Kashmir International Arbitration Centre was started in April 2022 to provide inexpensive and time saving arbitration and mediation proceedings in case of dispute on international commercial transactions. Jammu and Kashmir International Arbitration was formed as per Segment 89 of the Civil Procedure Code, 1908 giving benefit to individuals for out of court settlement in case of any commercial disputes. The setting up of Jammu and Kashmir International Arbitration Centre will help guiding the foreign investors who are unaware of country's laws.

== Aims ==
Jammu and Kashmir International Arbitration Centre has been formed with following aims

- Improvement of ranking related to the Ease of Doing Business Index.
- Faster resolution of any disputes with confidentiality relating to international investors and traders not knowing domestic laws.
- Promoting investments in the state from national and international investors.
- Giving investors flexibility, choice and confidence during alternate dispute resolution.
- Helps in bridging language and cultural differences.
- Resolving legal language-related issues causing inconvenience to investors in financial and other commercial challenges.

== Members ==
Jammu and Kashmir International Arbitration Centre will have famous people from various walks of life, retired judges, Chartered Accountants, Lawyers, experienced officers, engineers, bureaucrats and architects and professors.

== See also ==
- Dispute resolution
