= Arthur Monty M. Ahalt =

American judge

Judge for the Circuit Court of Prince George's County
- In office February 9, 1982 – September 17, 1999
- Appointed by: Harry R. Hughes
- Preceded by: Samuel W. H. Meloy

Personal details
- Born: Arthur Montraville Monty Ahalt; April 27, 1942 (age 83) Washington, D.C.
- Education: University of Maryland (BS); American University (JD)

Arthur Montraville Monty Ahalt (born April 27, 1942) is an American jurist, and a lifelong resident of Maryland. He served as Circuit Court Judge for Prince George's County, and is an internationally recognized advocate of technological solutions for the judicial and legal community. Judge Ahalt has pioneered advances in case management software and online dispute resolution, and is the founder and chief executive officer of VirtualCourthouse.com.

== Background ==
Judge Ahalt received his Bachelor of Science in Agricultural Economics from the University of Maryland in 1964 and his Juris Doctor from the Washington College of Law of the American University in 1967. He was a Law Clerk for Blair H. Smith, Esquire, Ralph W. Powers and J. Dudley Digges in the Seventh Judicial Circuit.

== Mediation career ==
Upon his retirement in 1999 Judge Ahalt commenced a career as a Mediator, Arbitrator and Technology Innovator. In addition to his private mediation practice Judge Ahalt is currently recalled by order of the Court of Appeals of Maryland to sit on specially assigned cases and conduct pre-trial, settlement conferences and ADR sessions. Judge Ahalt has been certified as a mediator by all of the Courts of Maryland. He has also been certified to mediate Medical Malpractice Disputes by the statewide Medical Malpractice panel and the statewide panel for Complex Business and Technology disputes. Judge Ahalt has successfully mediated tens of thousands disputes in areas including complex business transactions, construction, personal injury, medical malpractice, real estate, landlord and tenant, and contracts. He is frequently called upon by the parties and judges to mediate the most challenging judicial controversies involving post trial and appellate issues. He brings his 45 years of experience in the trial arena to benefit the parties assisting them in evaluating and mitigating risk. His efforts of tracking, analysing and publishing jury verdicts provide the litigants with real life examples of risk application.

== Judicial career ==
After 15 years of private practice as a litigator, Judge Ahalt was appointed to the Circuit Court for Prince George's County on February 9, 1982. His appointment was confirmed in November 1984 by election to a 15-year term. During this time Judge Ahalt tried over 750 jury trials, and eventuated the jury value of over 20,000 injuries as a neutral case evaluator for litigants in the Court's settlement practice. Judge Ahalt also served as President of the Prince George's County Bar Association, and chaired the Youth and Law Committee for the Maryland Bar Association until his retirement. His achievements in improving law related-education were recognized by the American Bar Association honoring him with the "Isidore Starr Award", which is the association's highest honor for law-related education.

== Technology Advocate ==
Judge Ahalt also served as Chief Industry Advisor for LexisNexis CourtLink, and as Chairman of the Circuit Court's Technology committee, which implemented JusticeLink. This represented the first comprehensive effort nationally to file pleadings electronically, and to organize the Court's information electronically so as to make it available to the public online. Judge Ahalt is on the faculty of the Institute for Court Management, and has lectured extensively on the need for technology to find a wider acceptance in the legal community. He has made presentations to the Conference of Chief Justices, The Conference of State Court Administrators, CTC6 the Technology Conference sponsored by the National Center for State Courts as well as the Tech shows of The American Bar Association, The Maryland Bar Association, and the Connecticut Bar Association.

Judge Ahalt is also founder and CEO of VirtualCourthouse.com, an online dispute resolution service that allows parties to choose a provider of ADR services to settle their dispute online. The site has settled over 1000 cases, and in 2009, it received the American Bar Association's Louis M. Brown Award for Legal Access for minimizing "the need and cost of unnecessary face-to-face meetings, mailing and copying" during the ADR process. In 2012, VirtualCourthouse.com entered into partnerships with the video-conferencing provider IOCOM as well as with Auburn University.
