= Mumbai International Arbitration Centre =

- Established: 2016
- Jurisdiction: International
- Location: Mumbai

Secretary-General

Chairperson

Mumbai Centre for International Arbitration is an autonomous institution formed as system for alternate dispute resolution and act as arbitrator or mediator in case of international commercial transactions. The channel helps in enforcing the right of individuals under section 89 of Civil Procedure Code, 1908 to exercise right for out of court settlement in case such possibility exists.

== History and Objective ==
Mumbai International Arbitration Centre was established in 2016 for resolving international disputes on commercial litigations, except those relating to tax and intellectual property, which can be resolved through arbitration and mediation.

== Aims ==
Mumbai International Arbitration Centre has been set up with the following objectives-

- Helps in settling international disputes which involves Indian companies.
- Improves Ease of Doing Business in the country, therefore inviting foreign investors and companies.
- Improving Cost efficiency for settling disputes as it can be settled in the country.
- Cities act as neutral place with arbitrators having best professional experience in International standards.
- Dispute to be resolved in 12 months from date of filing.

== Members ==
There are 18 members as Arbitrators in Mumbai International Arbitration Centre and 9 out of them are from other countries.

== Procedure ==
The rules for Mumbai Centre for International Arbitration (MCIA) lays down following procedure for arbitration process

- Application for dispute resolution to be made to Central Government.
- Arbitrator from Mumbai Centre for International Arbitration (MCIA) finalises day of hearing.
- After hearing and cross examination from parties to dispute, ruling is made.
- A standard percentage of fees is fixed by the Institution after claims and counter claims, which includes cost of the arbitrator and amount payable to the centre.

== Challenges ==
The awareness on Mumbai International Arbitration Centre as institution is less in general public and also it needs skilled people, financial support and staff are lacking.

== See also ==
- Dispute resolution
