= Mediation Act, 2023 =

Indian law impacting judiciary

Parliament of India
- Long title: An Act to promote and facilitate mediation, especially institutional mediation, for resolution of disputes, commercial or otherwise, enforce mediated settlement agreements, provide for a body for registration of mediators, to encourage community mediation and to make online mediation as acceptable and cost effective process and for matters connected therewith or incidental thereto.
- Citation: Act No. 32 of 2023
- Territorial extent: India
- Passed by: Rajya Sabha
- Passed: 1 August 2023
- Passed by: Lok Sabha
- Passed: 7 August 2023
- Assented to by: President Droupadi Murmu
- Assented to: 14 September 2023
- Commenced: 9 October 2023 Ss.1, 3, 26, Ss.31 to 38 (both inclusive), Ss. 45 to 47 (both inclusive), Ss. 50 to 54 (both inclusive), and Ss.56 to 57 (both inclusive)

Legislative history

Initiating chamber: Rajya Sabha
- Bill title: Mediation Bill, 2021
- Bill citation: Bill No. XLIII of 2021
- Introduced by: Kiren Rijiju, Minister of Law and Justice
- Introduced: 20 December 2021
- Standing Committee on Personnel, Public Grievances, Law and Justice: 20 December 2021–13 July 2022
- Passed: 1 August 2023

Revising chamber: Lok Sabha
- Passed: 7 August 2023

Amends
- 1. Indian Contract Act, 1872 (9 of 1872); 2. Code of Civil Procedure, 1908 (5 of 1908); 3. Legal Services Authorities Act, 1987 (39 of 1987); 4. Arbitration and Conciliation Act, 1996 (26 of 1996); 5. Micro, Small and Medium Enterprises Development Act, 2006 (27 of 2006); 6. Companies Act, 2013 (18 of 2013); 7. Commercial Courts Act, 2015 (4 of 2016); 8. Consumer Protection Act, 2019 (35 of 2019)
- Status: Not fully in force

The Mediation Act, 2023 was passed with the objective of reducing the burden on India's judiciary at large. The act provides for the provisions of mediation between the parties at large.

== Applicability of this Act ==
This Act applies to mediation conducted in India when:

1. all or both parties habitually reside, are incorporated, or have their place of business in India; or
2. the mediation agreement states that disputes will be resolved under this Act; or
3. there is an international mediation; or
4. one party is the Central or State Government, or its agencies, public bodies, corporations, or local bodies, including entities they control or own, and the matter pertains to a commercial dispute: or
5. any other dispute if the Central or State Government deems it appropriate and notifies it for resolution through mediation under this Act, where such Government bodies are a party.

== List of Sections of the Mediation Act, 2023 ==
Section Number	Section Title
1	Short title, extent and commencement.
2	Application
3	Definitions
4	Mediation agreement
5	Pre-litigation mediation
6	Disputes or matters not fit for mediation
7	Power of court or tribunal to refer parties to mediation
8	Appointment of mediators
9	Preference of parties
10	Conflict of interest and disclosure
11	Termination of mandate of mediator
12	Replacement of mediator
13	Territorial jurisdiction to undertake mediation
14	Commencement of mediation
15	Conduct of mediation
16	Role of mediator
17	Role of mediator in other proceedings
18	Time-limit for completion of mediation
19	Mediated settlement agreement
