= VirtualCourthouse.com =

Online dispute resolution service

- Company type: Private
- Founded: 2001
- Founder: Judge Arthur Monty M. Ahalt
- Headquarters: Annapolis, Maryland
- Area served: United States
- Website: www.virtualcourthouse.com

VirtualCourthouse.com is an online dispute resolution service that was founded by Judge Arthur Monty M. Ahalt in 2001 in order to provide a less expensive and faster way to resolve legal disputes. Today, disputing parties can choose from a directory listing over 300 neutrals, ranging from family mediators to construction arbitrators, and retired judges, who can mediate the dispute or render an arbitral award. VirtualCourthouse.com has settled thousands of cases across the United States.

In 2009, it received the American Bar Association's Louis M. Brown Award for Legal Access for minimizing "the need and cost of unnecessary face-to-face meetings, mailing and copying" during the ADR process.

In 2012, VirtualCourthouse.com entered into partnerships with the video-conferencing provider IOCOM as well as with Auburn University.

== See also ==
- Online dispute resolution
- Alternative dispute resolution
- Mediation
- Arbitration
