= EQuibbly =

eQuibbly
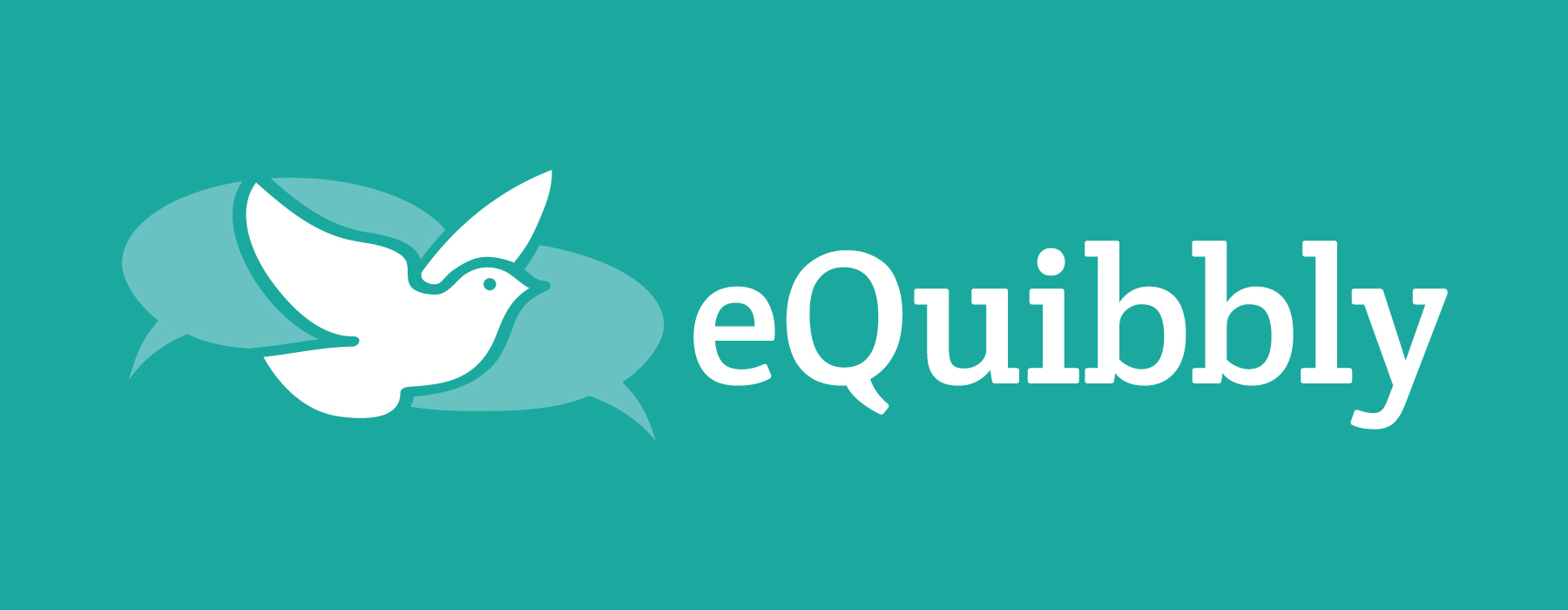
- Type: Private
- Industry: Computer software; Online services
- Founder: Lance Soskin
- Area served: North America
- Key people: Lance Soskin (President)
- Products: Online Arbitration
- Website: https://www.equibbly.com

eQuibbly was an online dispute resolution (ODR), offering individuals and companies in the U.S., Canada, and other countries that are signatories to the Convention on the Recognition and Enforcement of Foreign Arbitral Awards.

This is a private and legally binding alternative to pursuing litigation in court. It ceased operations in 2016.

== History ==
eQuibbly was developed to mitigate the cost of litigation which precludes many low- and middle-income families and individuals from seeking legal redress. According to a Chief Justice of a Supreme Court, "Lack of access to civil justice represents the most significant challenge to our justice system...courtrooms today are filled with litigants who are not represented by counsel, trying to navigate the sometimes complex demands of law and procedure..." eQuibbly founder, Lance Soskin, started up the online service in response to the needs of a friend who could not afford the legal costs associated with her litigation. "You can't go to court for a few hundred dollars," Soskin told CTV News Canada.

At its inception, the service garnered considerable media attention for introducing "crowdvoting" as a way to settle less serious disputes using "the wisdom of the crowds" as an alternative to litigating in small claims court, by encouraging people on the internet to vote on cases and register their opinions. This, however, was not a legally binding resolution. Since then eQuibbly has discontinued this public form of resolving disputes, as well as mediation. The service now offers only private, legally binding arbitration conducted by former trial judges. The decisions of the arbitrators are enforceable in a court of law.

== Logo ==
eQuibbly's logo is a visual metaphor for creating peace through dialog. It features a dove of peace abreast two dialog bubbles.
