= Plaint Checking under Indian Law =

Plaint checking under Indian law (or pleadings include Counter Claim also) by the Sheristadar Court is essentially a formal pre-admission scrutiny of the pleadings filed in law courts of India. The process is aimed at filtering out non-jurisdictional cases and getting other formal defects such as computation of Court fees and stamping of instruments, annexing spot map to the Plaint etc., rectified before the case is heard. In a Judgment the Bombay High court held that the trial court shall place such suits in objection category until the requirements of Order VII, rule 3 of the Code of Civil Procedure are satisfied. Similar direction has been imparted by Delhi High Court in its court rule file procedure. The High Court of Punjab and Haryana has prescribed procedure and rules for examination of Plaint in part C of its "Practice in the Trial of Civil Suits". In the state of Odisha, the practice is that the plaint is to be checked by the chief ministerial officer or Sheristadar prior to placing the same before the Presiding Officer for admission.

== Introduction ==
The process of civil litigation, in the Indian context, is regularized by the provisions of Code of Civil Procedure. The code is silent about procedures to be adopted for Plaint checking. However, circulars issued by the High Courts regulate intervention of office in fault-finding process at different stages of the suit. The newly introduced e-courts filing process, at the entry point, offers a checklist to make the scrutiny easier and uniform. Rule 22(b) of the Andhra Pradesh Civil Rules of Practice and Circular Orders, 1990 specifically states that upon presentation, the plaint shall be checked by the Chief Ministerial Officer of the court and is registered only after the officer finds it correct. The High Court of Delhi and Himachal Pradesh display in their respective websites common objection points in each category of cases to facilitate timely remediation of such defects.

In cases filed in the Supreme Court of India, the case passes through the scrutiny assistant to ensure that the case conforms to the rules and procedure of the court and is not defective. The procedure further mandates that the petitions should be prepared as per the checklist available on the Court website so that it does not linger in a defective status.

== Points for scrutiny ==
Absent any hard and fast rule on the matter, the basic criteria regarding jurisdiction, subject-wise maintainability, drafting basics regarding Court-language, paper size and essential ingredients of pleading, and limitation, are points of scrutiny.

=== Jurisdiction ===
==== Territorial ====
Territorial jurisdiction divides the court vertically. The suit/case must come under the territorial jurisdiction of the court trying the suit/case. Territorial jurisdiction is determined by the territory in which the subject matter related to the suit is situated. The subject matter can be any property, immovable as well as movable. The place is well defined in the chapter “Place of suing” i.e. section 15 to 20 of CPC.

Place of suing is defined in other statues such as the Hindu Marriage Act and Special Marriage Act.

==== Pecuniary ====
Pecuniary jurisdiction of the court divides the court vertically. The monetary limit, i.e. the suit value that is triable by a particular class of civil court is provided under the Orissa Civil Courts Act. The pecuniary limit triable in the courts of a civil judge is Rs.50,000, whereas the courts of senior civil judge can try higher-valued suits.

In respect of the appellate forum, appeals arising out of the judgments of a Civil Judge are filed before the Senior Civil Judge and the first appeal arising out of judgments of a Senior Civil Judge is filed before the District Judge.

==== Subject ====
The original jurisdiction decides whether the court has jurisdiction to entertain a suit/case of that nature on the basis of the statues.

For example; suits under the Hindu Marriage Act, irrespective of the suit value, are triable by a Senior Civil Judge, whereas suits under the Special Marriage Act are triable by a District Judge. Once a Family Court is established in a particular area, the subject wise jurisdiction of the District Judge, Senior Civil Judge and Judicial Magistrate First Class in respect of the family disputes are excluded as provided in sec.8 of the Family Courts Act, 1984.

=== Valuation of suit and computation of court fee ===
Calculating the court fee payable for a suit/petition requires understanding of the Court Fees Act and Suits Valuation Act. The office note must verify the calculation of court fees, keeping in view the Court fees (Orissa amendment) Act and stamp duty payable on the documents addressing the Indian Stamp (Orissa amendment) act. The applicability of ad valorem/fixed court fee in a particular suit is to be assessed from the statement in the Plaint.

=== Limitation for filing suit/case ===
The Limitation Act prescribes the statute of limitation for filing a suit/case and procedure for computation of the limit. As such, the office note should examine whether the suit/case has been filed within the limit as prescribed by laws relevant for the purpose.

=== Stamps ===
A duty is cast upon the Courts to ascertain whether documents are duly stamped, even should the defendant raise no objection.

== Legal drafting ==
Order VII of the CPC deals with plaint. Its rules define essential points for drafting a plaint that satisfied CPC as well as other statutes. The chapter deals with the essential points that a plaint must bear. In addition, some Courts devise their own litigant checklists.

The format of the pleading, as sometimes prescribed under relevant rules, is another aspect of scrutiny.

== Limitations of plaint checking ==
Plaint checking is a pre-admission scrutiny that attempts to expose drafting defects. Although limitations of plaint checking are nowhere defined under procedural law such as Civil Procedure Code, since the process is technical, it ought not creep into the legal issues. Plaint checking should not be doing the defendant's jobs.

== See also ==
- 'CPC'
