= Amazon vs. Reliance Group =

Amazon vs. Reliance Industries is a high-profile legal dispute over the control of Future Retail Ltd., one of India’s largest retail chains. The battle began after Amazon acquired a stake in Future Coupons Pvt. Ltd., which indirectly controlled Future Retail. When Future Group agreed to sell its retail business to Reliance Retail in 2020, Amazon claimed this violated its contractual rights, leading to arbitration in Singapore and multiple court proceedings in India. The case has involved issues of international arbitration, enforcement of emergency arbitration awards, competition law, insolvency proceedings, and regulatory interventions. As of 2024, Future Retail has been ordered into liquidation by Indian courts, marking a significant development in the ongoing dispute.

== Background ==
In 2019, Amazon.com NV Investment Holdings LLC acquired a 49% stake in Future Coupons Pvt. Ltd., a promoter group entity of Future Retail Ltd., for approximately ₹1,500 crore. This deal granted Amazon indirect control over Future Retail and a contractual right of first refusal on Future Retail’s assets.

In August 2020, Future Group announced a ₹24,713 crore ($3.3 billion) agreement to sell its retail, wholesale, and logistics businesses to Reliance Retail Ventures Ltd., a subsidiary of Reliance Industries.

Amazon contended that the deal violated their investment agreement, which restricted Future Retail’s sale to certain competitors, including Reliance.

== Arbitration Proceedings ==
=== SIAC Emergency Arbitration ===
Amazon initiated emergency arbitration proceedings under the Singapore International Arbitration Centre (SIAC) rules, and on 25 October 2020, the emergency arbitrator issued an interim order restraining Future Retail from proceeding with the transaction.

=== Enforcement in Indian Courts ===
Amazon moved to enforce the SIAC award in Indian courts. In August 2021, the Supreme Court of India ruled that emergency arbitration awards are enforceable under Sections 17(1) and 17(2) of the Arbitration and Conciliation Act, 1996.

The Court emphasized that emergency arbitrator awards serve as interim measures pending the final arbitration award.

== Competition Commission and Regulatory Review ==
The Competition Commission of India (CCI) rescinded its approval of Amazon’s 2019 deal with Future Coupons, citing alleged suppression of material facts.

Amazon disputed the withdrawal, asserting that it did not affect their contractual rights.

== Reliance Takeover of Stores ==
In early 2022, Reliance began physically taking control of more than 200 Future Retail stores, alleging unpaid rents and lease breaches.

Amazon condemned the move as a violation of the SIAC interim order and described it as a “fraudulent and coercive takeover.”

== Insolvency Proceedings and Liquidation ==
=== NCLT Admission ===
Future Retail was admitted into insolvency proceedings by the National Company Law Tribunal (NCLT) in July 2022 after defaulting on loans exceeding ₹17,000 crore.

=== Liquidation Order ===
On 27 July 2024, the NCLT ordered the liquidation of Future Retail after no resolution plan was approved within the statutory timeline.

== Legal and Policy Implications ==
=== Arbitration Law ===
The Supreme Court’s affirmation of emergency arbitration awards has reinforced India’s pro-arbitration stance, harmonizing domestic law with international commercial arbitration practices.

=== Insolvency and Bankruptcy ===
The Future Retail case underscores challenges in resolving distressed assets amid overlapping arbitration, regulatory, and enforcement actions.

=== Competition and E-commerce Regulation ===
Scrutiny by the CCI and other agencies demonstrates India's increasing regulatory attention to antitrust issues in the fast-growing digital and retail sectors.
