= Turnaround ADR =

Turnaround Alternative Dispute Resolution (ADR) (Japanese: 事業再生 Jigyo Saisei ADR), also known as Business Revitalization ADR, is a process increasingly used by companies in Japan to adjust their debt. This out-of-court procedure was established in Japan in 2007 and is based on Japanese Law, specifically the Special Measures Law for Industrial Revitalization and Rebirth of Japan. It allows companies to forgo bankruptcy proceedings and replaces previous voluntary debt adjustments under such as the "Guideline for Voluntary Debt Adjustment" (Shiteki Seiri Guideline).

Although the procedure is named using the generic alternative dispute resolution title, Turnaround ADR is not a procedure for resolving disputes. Rather, it offers a way for financially stressed companies to reassess and restructure debts.

== Features ==
When a Turnaround ADR is applied, the debtor can maintain payment to business partners and customers. Only claims held by financial institutions participating in this procedure become subject to adjustment; if the relevant institutions reach consensus, the debts can be minimized.

Turnaround ADR is frequently misunderstood in the United States and other Western nations because no equivalent procedure exists there. Applying for or initiating a Turnaround ADR is not considered a default triggering event. Rather, adopting a Turnaround ADR is considered a preferable procedure for financially distressed companies as it provides breathing space for such companies to focus on revitalizing their business. Such space is gained by the alleviation of debts against relevant financial institutions without adversely affecting integral business relationships with partners and customers.

A private operator certified by the Minister of Justice and the Minister of Economy, Trade and Industry, provides mediation services in a Turnaround ADR. The Japanese Association of Turnaround Professionals (JATP) is the only private operator certified to provide mediation services for Turnaround ADR. In this role, JATP normally appoints a mediator from a network of corporate turnaround professionals. This mediator is responsible for implementing the Turnaround ADR procedure fairly and objectively.
