= Dispute Resolution Councils =

Dispute Resolution Councils, Khyber Pakhtunkhwa
- Abbreviation: DRCs
- Formation: Police Act, 2017 (KP) – Section 73
- Founded: 2014
- Founder: Khyber Pakhtunkhwa Police
- Type: Alternative Dispute Resolution body / Community justice institution
- Legal status: Active
- Headquarters: Peshawar, Khyber Pakhtunkhwa, Pakistan
- Region served: Khyber Pakhtunkhwa, Pakistan
- Key people: Registrar (elected), Police Coordinator attached to each council
- Main organ: Panels of 3 members each (seven panels per council)

The Dispute Resolution Councils (DRCs) are community-based alternative dispute resolution institutions established in the Khyber Pakhtunkhwa (KP) province of Pakistan. They aim to resolve minor disputes amicably at the local level, reduce the burden on courts and police stations, and provide prompt and accessible justice to the public.

== History ==
The first DRC in KP was launched as a pilot project in Gulbahar Police Station in Peshawar in 2014. From Peshawar, the model was expanded to other districts of Khyber Pakhtunkhwa, with DRCs established at the police station level in several districts and eventually across the province. Over time, there has been an increasing focus on ensuring inclusion (e.g., women’s participation) and integrating traditional principles of dispute resolution (e.g., jirga) with formal legal norms.

== Legal framework ==
The DRCs are provided for under Section 73 of the Police Act 2017 (Khyber Pakhtunkhwa Police Act), which empowers the provincial police officer to constitute Dispute Resolution Councils at the police stations, sub-divisions, or district levels for “amicably settling out-of-court cases of minor nature”.

The initial pilot of DRCs began under earlier police orders, with further amendments providing them with legal protection after judicial scrutiny. Notably, after the Peshawar High Court stayed the DRCs for lack of legal validity, the KP Assembly amended the relevant laws in 2014 to provide a legal basis, allowing the councils to resume functioning.

== Structure and composition ==
- Each council is usually composed of about 21 or 22 members, drawn from respected non-political and non-controversial members of the community: intellectuals, retired civil and armed forces officers, academics, businessmen, lawyers, etc.
- These members are organized into panels (usually seven panels of three members each). The panels take cases, find facts, mediate, and attempt to reach amicable resolutions.
- A registrar is elected from among the members in each council, who assigns cases to the panel, coordinates, and ensures proper functioning.
- Each council is also accompanied by a police coordinator (an officer from the police department), who is responsible for process-oriented tasks such as serving summons, ensuring attendance, providing legal guidance (where necessary), and ensuring compliance with laws.

== Jurisdiction and function ==
DRCs resolve minor disputes, often non-violent disputes between community members. The goal is an amicable and speedy resolution that avoids escalation and reduces the formal backlog of justice.

Functions include amicable settlements between parties, fact-finding inquiries, and acting to some extent like a jury or advisory body.

Cases not resolved by DRCs may be referred to formal courts or other legal forums.

== Impact ==
In one year, in KP, DRCs received 10,386 cases, of which 7,179 were resolved amicably, 1,465 were forwarded, and the others were pending at the end of the year. In another report, during a six-month period, 5,753 cases were resolved, of which 5,404 were settled. Some of the cases were referred to appropriate forums. Benefits noted include: increased access to justice (especially in remote areas), reduced burden on courts and police, fostered community trust, and encouraged non-violent dispute resolution.

== Bibliography ==
- Farhad, Aarzoo; Ali, Rafia Naz; Khan, Nida; Rubab, Huma (9 May 2024). "Analyzing the efficiency of Alternative Dispute Resolution: A study of Dispute Resolution Council in Pakistan". International Journal of Social Science Archives. 7 (2): 254–260.
- Nouman, Muhammad; Ahmad, Zeeshan; Ullah, Maghfoor (2022). "The Role of Dispute Resolution Council in Dispute Resolution: A Case Study of Khyber Pakhtunkhwa". Global Regional Review. 7 (4): 46–52. doi:10.31703/grr.2022(VII-IV).05.
- Generator, Metatags (15 June 2022). "Exploring the Efficiency of Dispute Resolution Council (DRC) for Peaceful Settlement of Disputes in District Lower Dir". Pakistan Journal of Society, Education and Language (PJSEL). 8 (2): 168–176.
