= Alternative dispute resolution =

Range of dispute resolution processes

Alternative dispute resolution (ADR), or external dispute resolution (EDR), typically denotes a wide range of dispute resolution processes and techniques that parties can use to settle disputes with the help of a third party. They are used for disagreeing parties who cannot come to an agreement short of litigation. However, ADR is also increasingly being adopted as a tool to help settle disputes within the court system.

Despite historic resistance to ADR by many popular parties and their advocates, ADR has gained widespread acceptance among both the general public and the legal profession in recent years. In 2008, some courts required some parties to resort to ADR of some type, like mediation, before permitting the parties' cases to be tried (the European Mediation Directive (2008) expressly contemplates so-called "compulsory" mediation. This means that attendance is compulsory, not that settlement must be reached through mediation). Additionally, parties to merger and acquisition transactions are increasingly turning to ADR to resolve post-acquisition disputes. In England and Wales, ADR is now more commonly referred to as ‘NCDR’ (Non Court Dispute Resolution), in an effort to promote this as the normal (rather than alternative) way to resolve disputes. A 2023 judgment of the Court of Appeal called Churchill v Merthyr confirmed that in the right case the Court can order (i) the parties to engage in NCDR and / or (ii) stay the proceedings to allow for NCDR to take place. This overturns the previous orthodoxy (the 2004 Court of Appeal decision of Halsey v. Milton Keynes General NHS Trust) which was that unwilling parties could not be obliged to participate in NCDR.

The rising popularity of ADR can be explained by the increasing caseload of traditional courts, the perception that ADR imposes fewer costs than litigation, a preference for confidentiality, and the desire of some parties to have greater control over the selection of the individual or individuals who will decide their dispute. Some of the senior judiciary in certain jurisdictions (of which England and Wales is one) are strongly in favour of this use of mediation and other NCDR processes to settle disputes. Since the 1990s many American courts have also increasingly advocated for the use of ADR to settle disputes. However, it is not clear as to whether litigants can properly identify and then use the ADR programmes available to them, thereby potentially limiting their effectiveness.

== History ==
The term "alternative dispute resolution" arose from Frank Sander's paper, "Varieties of Dispute Processing".

Traditional arbitration involved heads of trade guilds or other dominant authorities settling disputes. The modern innovation was to have commercial vendors of arbitrators, often ones with little or no social or political dominance over the parties. The advantage was that such persons were much more readily available. The disadvantage is that it does not involve the community of the parties. When wool contract arbitration was conducted by senior guild officials, the arbitrator combined a seasoned expert on the subject matter with a socially dominant individual whose patronage, goodwill and opinion were important.

ADR can increasingly be conducted online, which is known as online dispute resolution (ODR, which is mostly a buzzword and an attempt to create a distinctive product). ODR services can be provided by government entities, and as such may form part of the litigation process. Moreover, they can be provided on a global scale, where no effective domestic remedies are available to disputing parties, as in the case of the UDRP and domain name disputes. In this respect, ODR might not satisfy the "alternative" element of ADR. In England and Wales, the Online Procedure Rule Committee was set up under the Judicial Review and Courts Act 2022 to make rules governing the practice and procedure for specific types of online court and tribunal proceedings across the Civil, Family and Tribunal jurisdictions. OPRC is an advisory non-departmental public body, sponsored by the Ministry of Justice. The committee is chaired by the Master of the Rolls, Head of Civil Justice.

== Definition ==
ADR has historically been divided between methods of resolving disputes outside of official judicial mechanisms and informal methods attached to official judicial mechanisms. Regardless of whether they are part of an overarching proceeding, the mechanisms are generally similar. There are four general classes of ADR: negotiation, mediation, collaborative law, and arbitration. In some contexts, such as in the settlement of investment disputes, arbitration is not considered as a form of ADR, since it is the principal means of settling these disputes. Some academics include conciliation as a fifth category, but others include this within the definition of mediation.

Conflict resolution is one major goal of all the ADR processes. If a process leads to resolution, it is a dispute resolution process. "Alternative" dispute resolution is usually considered to be alternative to litigation. For example, corporate dispute resolution can involve a customer service department handling disputes about its own products, addressing concerns between consumers and independent, third-party sellers, and participating in a reputation-based enforcement mechanism. It also can be used as a colloquialism for allowing a dispute to drop or as an alternative to violence.

In recent years, there has been more discussion about taking a systems approach in order to offer different kinds of options to people who are in conflict and to foster "appropriate" dispute resolution. That is, some cases and some complaints, in fact, ought to go to a formal grievance, to a court, to the police, to a compliance officer, or to a government IG. Other conflicts could be settled by the parties if they had enough support and coaching, and yet other cases need mediation or arbitration. Thus, "alternative" dispute resolution usually means a method that is not the courts. "Appropriate" dispute resolution considers all the possible responsible options for conflict resolution that are relevant to a given issue.

=== Negotiation ===
In negotiation, participation is voluntary and there is no third party who facilitates the resolution process or imposes a resolution. (NB – a third party like a chaplain or organizational ombudsperson or social worker or a skilled friend may be coaching one or both of the parties behind the scenes, a process called "Helping People Help Themselves" – see Helping People Help Themselves, in Negotiation Journal July 1990, pp. 239–248, which includes a section on helping someone draft a letter to someone who is perceived to have wronged them.)

=== Mediation ===
In mediation, there is a third party, a mediator, who facilitates the resolution process (and may even suggest a resolution, typically known as a "mediator's proposal") but does not impose a resolution on the parties. In some countries (for example, the United Kingdom), ADR is synonymous with what is generally referred to as mediation in other countries. Structured transformative mediation as used by the U.S. Postal Service is a formal process.

Traditional people's mediation has always involved the parties remaining in contact for most or all of the mediation sessions. The innovation of separating the parties after (or sometimes before) a joint session and conducting the rest of the process without the parties in the same area was a major innovation and one that dramatically improved mediation's success rate.

==== Lawyer-supported mediation ====
Lawyer-supported mediation is a "non-adversarial method of alternative dispute resolution to resolve disputes, such as settling family issues at a time of divorce or separation, including child support, custody issues, and division of property".

==== Party-directed mediation ====
Party-directed mediation (PDM) is an approach to mediation that seeks to empower each party in a dispute, enabling each party to have a more direct influence upon the resolution of a conflict, by offering both means and processes for enhancing the negotiation skills of contenders. The intended prospect of party-directed mediation is to improve upon the ability and willingness of disputants to deal with subsequent differences.

=== Collaborative law ===
In collaborative law or collaborative divorce, each party has an attorney who facilitates the resolution process within specifically contracted terms. The parties reach an agreement with the support of the attorneys (who are trained in the process) and mutually agreed experts. No one imposes a resolution on the parties.

=== Arbitration ===
In arbitration, participation is typically voluntary, and there is a third party who, as a private judge, imposes a resolution. Arbitrations often occur because parties to contracts agree that any future dispute concerning the agreement will be resolved by arbitration. This is known as a 'Scott Avery Clause'. In recent years, the enforceability of arbitration clauses, particularly in the context of consumer agreements (e.g., credit card agreements), has drawn scrutiny from courts. Although parties may appeal arbitration outcomes to courts, such appeals face an exacting standard of review.

=== Conciliation ===
Conciliation is an alternative dispute resolution (ADR) process whereby the parties to a dispute use a conciliator, who meets with the parties both separately and together in an attempt to resolve their differences. They do this by lowering tensions, improving communications, interpreting issues, encouraging parties to explore potential solutions, and assisting parties in finding a mutually acceptable outcome.

=== Other methods ===
Beyond the basic types of alternative dispute resolutions, there are other different forms of ADR.

==== Case evaluation ====
Case evaluation is a non-binding process in which parties present the facts and the issues to a neutral case evaluator who advises the parties on the strengths and weaknesses of their respective positions, and assesses how the dispute is likely to be decided by a jury or other adjudicator.

==== Early neutral evaluation ====
Early neutral evaluation is a process that takes place soon after a case has been filed in court. The case is referred to an expert who is asked to provide a balanced and neutral evaluation of the dispute. The evaluation of the expert can assist the parties in assessing their case and may influence them towards a settlement.

==== One Couple One Lawyer ====
One Couple One Lawyer, or Single Lawyer, is a family law process developed in England and Wales where a separating couple shares one lawyer who advises them both, impartially and together, as to how a judge would view their case, and the likely outcome were they to litigate, thus enabling them to reach a fair settlement on separation or divorce. This differs from early neutral evaluation as it is designed so that parties never require separate representation, are assisted throughout by one legal team and the process has no adversarial features at all, either at the financial disclosure or advice stages.

In April 2024, a new definition of NCDR was set out in the Family Procedure (Amendments No 2) Rules 2023/1324 as “methods of resolving a dispute other than through the court process, including but not limited to mediation, arbitration, evaluation by a neutral third party (such as a private Financial Dispute Resolution process) and collaborative law.” In the accompanying Pre-application Protocol (Annex to PD9A), the One Couple One Lawyer process was also referenced “The court may also consider the parties having obtained legal advice via the “single lawyer” or a “one couple, one lawyer” scheme as good evidence of a constructive attempt to obtain advice and avoid unnecessary proceedings […]”

==== Family group conference ====
A family group conference is a meeting between members of a family and members of their extended related group. At this meeting (or often a series of meetings) the family becomes involved in learning skills for interaction and in making a plan to stop the abuse or other ill-treatment between its members.

==== Neutral fact-finding ====
Neutral fact-finding is a process where a neutral third party, selected either by the disputing parties or by the court, investigates an issue and reports or testifies in court. The neutral fact-finding process is particularly useful for resolving complex scientific and factual disputes.

==== Expert determination ====
Expert determination is a procedure where a dispute or a difference between the parties is submitted, by mutual agreement of the parties, to one or more experts who make a determination on the matter referred to them. The determination is binding, unless the parties agreed otherwise, and is a confidential procedure.

==== Ombudsmen ====
Ombudsmen are a third party selected by an institution—for example, a university, hospital, corporation or government agency—to deal with complaints by employees, clients or constituents. An organizational ombudsman works within the institution to look into complaints independently and impartially. Calling an organizational ombudsman is always voluntary; according to the International Ombudsman Association Standards of Practice, no one can be compelled to use an ombudsman office. Organizational ombudsman offices refer people to all conflict management options in the organization: formal and informal, rights-based and interest-based. But, in addition, in part because they have no decision-making authority, ombudsman offices can, themselves, offer a wide spectrum of informal options.

== Advantages and disadvantages ==
- Suitable for multi-party disputes
- Lower costs: in many cases dispute resolution is available to consumers free of charge
- Likelihood and speed of settlements
- Flexibility of process
- Parties' control of process
- Parties' choice of forum
- Practical solutions
- A wider range of issues can be considered
- Shared future interests may be protected
- Confidentiality
- Risk management
- Generally no need for lawyers
- Can be a less confrontational alternative to the court system

However, ADR is less suitable than litigation when there is:

- A need for precedent
- A need for court orders
- A need for interim orders
- A need for evidential rules
- A need for enforcement
- Power imbalance between parties
- Quasi-criminal allegations
- Complexity in the case
- The need for live evidence or analysis of complex evidence
- The need for expert evidence

== Country-specific examples ==
=== Canada ===
In the 1980s and 1990s Canada saw the beginning of a "cultural shift" in their experience with ADR practices. During this time, the need was recognized for an alternative to the more adversarial approach to dispute settlement that is typical in traditional court proceedings. This growth continued over the coming decades, with ADR now being widely recognized as a legitimate and effective approach to dispute resolution. In 2014, the Supreme Court of Canada stated in Hryniak v Mauldin that "meaningful access to justice is now the greatest challenge to the rule of law in Canada today... [The] balance between procedure and access struck by our justice system must reflect modern reality and recognize that new models of adjudication can be fair and just." However, in the decades leading up to this declaration there had already been a number of experiments in ADR practices across the provinces.

One of the first and most notable ADR initiatives in Canada began on 4 January 1999, with the creation of the Ontario Mandatory Mediation Program. This program included the implementation of Rule 24.1, which established mandatory mediation for non-family civil case-managed actions. Beginning in a selection of courts across Ontario and Ottawa in 1999, the program would be expanded in 2002 to cover Windsor, Ontario's third-largest judicial area. Until this point, opposition to mandatory mediation in place of traditional litigation had been grounded in the idea that mediation practices are effective when disputing parties voluntarily embrace the process. However, reports analyzing the effectiveness of Ontario's experiment concluded that overall mandatory mediation as a form of ADR was able to reduce both the cost and time delay of finding a dispute resolution, compared to a control group. In addition to this, 2/3's of the parties surveyed from this study outlined the benefits to mandatory mediation; these included:

(i) providing one or more parties with new information they considered relevant;

(ii) identifying matters important to one or more of the parties;

(iii) setting priorities among issues;

(iv) facilitating discussion of new settlement offers;

(v) achieving better awareness of the potential monetary savings from settling earlier in the litigation process;

(vi) at least one of the parties gaining a better understanding of his or her own ADR in Administrative Litigation 157 case; and

(vii) at least one of the parties gaining a better understanding of his or her opponent's case.

In other provinces, the need for ADR to at least be examined as an alternative to traditional court proceedings has also been expressed. For instance, in 2015 Quebec implemented the New Code, which mandated that parties must at least consider mediation before moving to settle a dispute in court. The New Code also codified the role of the mediator in the courtroom, outlining that mediators must remain impartial and cannot give evidence on either party's behalf should the dispute progress to a judicial proceeding. In 2009, a report showed that Manitoba's experience with their Judicially Assisted Dispute Resolution program, an ADR initiative where the court appoints a judge to act as a mediator between two disputing parties who both voluntarily wish to pursue JADR.

One of the main arguments for ADR practices in Canada cites the over-clogged judicial system. This is one of the main arguments for ADR across many regions; however, Alberta, in particular, suffers from this issue. With a rising population, in 2018 Alberta had the highest ratio for the population to Superior Court Justices, 63,000:1. The national average, on the other hand, is nearly half that, with one Justice being counted for every 35,000 Canadians.

To become qualified as a mediator in Canada, it is possible to gain mediation training through certain private organizations or post-secondary institutions. The ADR Institute of Canada (ADRIC) is the preeminent ADR training organization in Canada.

=== China ===
The practice of "people's mediation" arose in the 1920s in areas under the control of the Chinese Communist Party (CCP), which lacked developed judicial infrastructure. "People's mediation" continued after Mao Zedong's 1949 proclamation of the People's Republic of China. The 2010 People's Mediation Law formalized people's mediation practices, which are carried out by local committees supervised by justice administrative organs (JAOs) of the Ministry of Justice. Agreements reached during people's mediation are legally binding and enforceable by the courts if necessary.

Local courts in China also establish and operate people's mediation offices. The courts hire, compensate, train, and manage mediators in such offices and the JAOs retain de jure supervision. Region-specific approaches to meditation include the "golden flower mediators" of a Bai ethnic region in Yunnan: troubled by an increase in court disputes among neighboring clans, the local court hired well-educated and respected Bai women to mediate. As "golden flower" (a traditional Bai honorific for influential women) mediators, they conducted mediations in the Bai language and incorporated other Bai traditional cultural elements (such as dressing for work in Bai garments and traditional Bai decor in mediation rooms).

In the PRC in the late 2010s, the Litigation Source Management Campaign expanded the use of lay mediation as an alternative to litigation, based on the theory that mediation was a more accessible and quicker alternative to formal adjudication. The campaign re-routed a significant volume of disputes from the judiciary.

=== India ===
Alternative dispute resolution in India is not new, and it was in existence even under the previous Arbitration Act of 1940. The Arbitration and Conciliation Act, 1996 has been enacted to accommodate the harmonization mandates of the UNCITRAL Model. To streamline the Indian legal system, the traditional civil law known as the Code of Civil Procedure, (CPC) 1908 has also been amended, and Section 89 has been introduced. Section 89(1) of CPC provides an option for the settlement of disputes outside the court. It provides that where it appears to the court that there exist elements that may be acceptable to the parties, the court may formulate the terms of a possible settlement and refer the same for arbitration, conciliation, mediation or judicial settlement. India has also enacted The Mediation Act, 2023 to provide for the law with respect to mediation in India.

Due to the extremely slow judicial process, there has been a large emphasis on alternate dispute resolution mechanisms in India. While the Arbitration and Conciliation Act of 1996 is a fairly standard Western approach towards ADR, the Lok Adalat system constituted under the National Legal Services Authority Act, 1987 is a uniquely Indian approach.

A study on commercial dispute resolution in south India has been done by a think tank organization based in Kochi, Centre for Public Policy Research. The study reveals that the Court-annexed Mediation Centre in Bangalore has a success rate of 64%, while its counterpart in Kerala has an average success rate of 27.7%. Furthermore, amongst the three southern states (Karnataka, Tamil Nadu, and Kerala), Tamil Nadu is said to have the highest adoption of dispute resolution, and Kerala the least.

==== Arbitration and Conciliation Act, 1996 ====
An Act to consolidate and amend the law relating to domestic arbitration, international commercial arbitration, and enforcement of foreign arbitral awards as also to define the law relating to conciliation and for matters connected therewith or incidental thereto.

===== Arbitration =====
The process of arbitration can start only if there exists a valid Arbitration Agreement between the parties prior to the emergence of the dispute. As per Section 7, such an agreement must be in writing. The contract regarding which the dispute exists, must either contain an arbitration clause or must refer to a separate document signed by the parties containing the arbitration agreement. The existence of an arbitration agreement can also be inferred by written correspondence such as letters, telex, or telegrams which provide a record of an agreement. An exchange of statement of claim and defence in which the existence of an arbitration agreement is alleged by one party and not denied by other is also considered as a valid written arbitration agreement.

Any party to the dispute can start the process of appointing an arbitrator and if the other party does not cooperate, the party can approach the office of Chief Justice for the appointment of an arbitrator. There are only two grounds upon which a party can challenge the appointment of an arbitrator – reasonable doubt in the impartiality of the arbitrator and the lack of proper qualification of the arbitrator as required by the arbitration agreement. A sole arbitrator or a panel of arbitrators so appointed constitute the Arbitration Tribunal.

Except for some interim measures, there is very little scope for judicial intervention in the arbitration process. The arbitration tribunal has jurisdiction over its own jurisdiction. Thus, if a party wants to challenge the jurisdiction of the arbitration tribunal, it can do so only before the tribunal itself. If the tribunal rejects the request, there is little the party can do except to approach a court after the tribunal makes an award. Section 34 provides certain grounds upon which a party can appeal to the principal civil court of original jurisdiction for setting aside the award.

The period for filing an appeal for setting aside an award is over, or if such an appeal is rejected, the award is binding on the parties and is considered as a decree of the court.

===== Conciliation =====
Conciliation is a less formal form of arbitration. This process does not require the existence of any prior agreement. Any party can request the other party to appoint a conciliator. One conciliator is preferred but two or three are also allowed. In the case of multiple conciliators, all must act jointly. If a party rejects an offer to conciliate, there can be no conciliation.

Parties may submit statements to the conciliator describing the general nature of the dispute and the points at issue. Each party sends a copy of the statement to the other. The conciliator may request further details, may ask to meet the parties, or communicate with the parties orally or in writing. Parties may even submit suggestions for the settlement of the dispute to the conciliator.

When it appears to the conciliator that elements of settlement exist, he may draw up the terms of the settlement and send it to the parties for their acceptance. If both the parties sign the settlement document, it shall be final and binding on both.

This process is similar to the US practice of mediation. However, in India, mediation is different from conciliation and is a completely informal type of ADR mechanism.

==== Lok Adalat ====
Etymologically, Lok Adalat means "people's court". India has had a long history of resolving disputes through the mediation of village elders. The current system of Lok Adalats is an improvement on that and is based on Gandhian principles. This is a non-adversarial system, whereby mock courts (called Lok Adalats) are held by the State Authority, District Authority, Supreme Court Legal Services Committee, High Court Legal Services Committee, or Taluk Legal Services Committee, periodically for exercising such jurisdiction as they think fit. These are usually presided by a retired judge, social activists, or members of the legal profession. It does not have jurisdiction on matters related to non-compoundable offences.

While in regular suits, the plaintiff is required to pay the prescribed court fee, in Lok Adalat, there is no court fee and no rigid procedural requirement (i.e. no need to follow the process given by [Indian] Civil Procedure Code or Indian Evidence Act), which makes the process very fast. Parties can directly interact with the judge, which is not possible in regular courts.

Cases that are pending in regular courts can be transferred to a Lok Adalat if both the parties agree. A case can also be transferred to a Lok Adalat if one party applies to the court and the court sees some chance of settlement after giving an opportunity of being heard to the other party.

The focus in Lok Adalats is on compromise. When no compromise is reached, the matter goes back to the court. However, if a compromise is reached, an award is made and is binding on the parties. It is enforced as a decree of a civil court. An important aspect is that the award is final and cannot be appealed, not even under Article 226 of the Constitution of India [which empowers the litigants to file Writ Petition before High Courts] because it is a judgement by consent.

All proceedings of a Lok Adalat are deemed to be judicial proceedings and every Lok Adalat is deemed to be a Civil Court.

=== Pakistan ===
The relevant laws (or parlour provisions) dealing with the ADR are summarized as under:

1. S.89-A of the Civil Procedure Code, 1908 (Indian but amended in 2002) read with Order X Rule 1-A (deals with alternative dispute resolution methods).
2. The Small Claims and Minor Offences Courts Ordinance, 2002.
3. Sections 102–106 of the Local Government Ordinance, 2001.
4. Sections 10 and 12 of the Family Courts Act, 1964.
5. Chapter XXII of the Code of Criminal Procedure, 1898 (summary trial provisions).
6. The Arbitration Act, 1940 (Indian).
7. Articles 153–154 of the Constitution of Pakistan, 1973 (Council of Common Interest)
8. Article 156 of the Constitution of Pakistan, 1973 (National Economic Council)
9. Article 160 of the Constitution of Pakistan, 1973 (National Finance Commission)
10. Article 184 of the Constitution of Pakistan, 1973 (Original Jurisdiction when federal or provincial governments are at dispute with one another)
11. Arbitration (International Investment Disputes) Act, 2011
12. Recognition and Enforcement (Arbitration Agreements and Foreign Arbitral Awards) Act, 2011
13. Dispute Resolution Councils, 2014
14. Alternative Dispute Resolution Act. 2017

=== Somalia ===
Somalia has a cultural and historic mediation and justice system known as Xeer, which is an informal justice system. It is a kind of justice system in which the arbiter listens to both sides of a dispute and then concludes a solution that both sides will accept.

=== Sub-Saharan Africa ===
Before modern state law was introduced under colonialism, African customary legal systems mainly relied on mediation and conciliation. In many countries, these traditional mechanisms have been integrated into the official legal system. In Benin, specialised tribunaux de conciliation hear cases on a broad range of civil law matters. Results are then transmitted to the court of the first instance where either a successful conciliation is confirmed or jurisdiction is assumed by the higher court. Similar tribunals also operate, in varying modes, in other francophone African countries.

=== United Kingdom ===
In the United Kingdom, ADR is encouraged as a means of resolving taxpayers' disputes with His Majesty's Revenue and Customs.

ADR providers exist in the regulated finance, telecoms and energy sectors. Outside these regulated areas, there are schemes in many sectors which provide schemes for voluntary membership. Two sets of regulations, in March and June 2015, were laid in Parliament to implement the European Directive on alternative dispute resolution in the UK.

Alternative Dispute Resolution is now widely used in the UK across many sectors. In the communications, energy, finance and legal sectors, it is compulsory for traders to signpost to approved ADR schemes when they are unable to resolve disputes with consumers. In the aviation sector there is a quasi-compulsory ADR landscape, where airlines have an obligation to signpost to either an approved ADR scheme or PACT - which is operated by the Civil Aviation Authority.

The UK adopted the Alternative Dispute Resolution for Consumer Disputes (Competent Authorities and Information) Regulations 2015 on 1 October 2015, which set out rules in relation to ADR and put measures into place to widen the use and application of ADR in disputes with consumers after any available internal procedures have been exhausted.

==== England and Wales ====
Judges in England and Wales often encourage use of ADR in appropriate legal cases, and such encouragement is endorsed in the Civil Procedure Rules (CPR 1.4). Halsey v Milton Keynes General NHS Trust provided guidance on cases where one party is willing to take part in ADR and the other refuses to do so on grounds which might be considered unreasonable. In a case which followed shortly after Halsey between Burchell, a builder, and Mr and Mrs Bullard, his customer, the Bullards and their solicitors had "blithely battle[d] on" with litigation where the Appeal Court found that ADR would have been a speedier and less costly means of resolving the parties' dispute. In a 2013 case which has been described as "com[ing] a long way" since Halsey, the Court of Appeal strengthened the argument for using mediation and asserted that "mediation works". In PGF II SA v OMFS Company 1 Ltd, PGF II issued several invitations to OFMS to take part in mediation to resolve a dispute on dilapidations between them, which received no response. The trial court and appeal court agreed that "no response" amounted to an "unreasonable refusal to participate" in ADR. The issues were resolved by a settlement immediately prior to the trial date and a cost sanction imposed on OFMS. The Appeal Court upheld the guidance in the ADR Handbook, which stated that "silence in the face of an invitation to participate in ADR is, as a general rule, of itself unreasonable", and thus endorsed the value of the ADR Handbook itself.

In England and Wales, ADR is now more commonly referred to as NCDR (Non-Court Dispute Resolution), in an effort to promote this as the normal (rather than alternative) way to resolve disputes. In a 2023 judgment, Churchill v Merthyr Tydfil County Borough Council, the Court of Appeal confirmed that in the right case courts can order (i) the parties to engage in NCDR and / or (ii) stay the proceedings to allow for NCDR to take place. This overturns the previous orthodoxy (the 2004 Court of Appeal decision in Halsey) which was that unwilling parties could not be obliged to participate in NCDR.

The senior judiciary in England and Wales are strongly in favour of greater use of NCDR. The Online Procedure Rule Committee was set up under the Judicial Review and Courts Act 2022 to make rules governing the practice and procedure for specific types of online court and tribunal proceedings across the civil, family and tribunal jurisdictions. OPRC is an advisory non-departmental public body, sponsored by the Ministry of Justice. The committee is chaired by the Master of the Rolls, head of civil justice. The aim is to deliver more integrated, efficient and digital approach to justice. Its work will support the use of innovative methods of resolving disputes and help define the operation of pre-action dispute resolution

In the Family Division, there has been a prevailing judicial view that the court should be the last resort for families. High Court judgments have followed the Court of Appeal decision in Churchill v Merthyr, confirming that the courts can stay proceedings to require parties to attend NCDR (Re X and NA v LA).

In April 2024, a new definition of NCDR was set out in the Family Procedure (Amendments No 2) Rules 2023 (SI 1324) as "methods of resolving a dispute other than through the court process, including but not limited to mediation, arbitration, evaluation by a neutral third party (such as a private Financial Dispute Resolution process) and collaborative law".

In the accompanying Pre-application Protocol (Annex to PD9A), the One Couple One Lawyer process was also referenced "The court may also consider the parties having obtained legal advice via the “single lawyer" or a "one couple, one lawyer" scheme as good evidence of a constructive attempt to obtain advice and avoid unnecessary proceedings". One Couple One Lawyer, or Single Lawyer, is a family law process developed in England and Wales where a separating couple shares one lawyer who advises them both, impartially and together, as to how a judge would view their case, and the likely outcome were they to litigate, thus enabling them to reach a fair settlement on separation or divorce. This differs from early neutral evaluation as it is designed so that parties never require separate representation, are assisted throughout by one legal team and the process has no adversarial features at all, either at the financial disclosure or advice stages.

The new Family Procedure Rules also gave the courts two new powers:

1. to require parties to set out their views on using NCDR in Form FM5; and
2. to consider whether a failure, without good reason, to engage in NCDR should impact on who pays the costs of the litigation.

=== United States ===
==== U.S. Navy ====
SECNAVINST 5800.13A established the DON ADR Program Office with the following missions:

- Coordinate ADR policy and initiatives;
- Assist activities in securing or creating cost-effective ADR techniques or local programs;
- Promote the use of ADR, and provide training in negotiation and ADR methods;
- Serve as legal counsel for in-house neutrals used on ADR matters; and,
- For matters that do not use in-house neutrals, the program assists DON attorneys and other representatives concerning issues in controversy that are amenable to using ADR.

The ADR Office also serves as the point of contact for questions regarding the use of ADR. The Assistant General Counsel (ADR) serves as the "Dispute Resolution Specialist" for the DON, as required by the Administrative Dispute Resolution Act of 1996. Members of the office represent the DON's interests on a variety of DoD and interagency working groups that promote the use of ADR within the Federal Government.

One example of ADR in the government after ADR act of 1996 is the Alternative Dispute Resolution Program which is used by the USDA to respond to conflict that may result in destructive outcomes by offering employees different options to combat discrepancies. They also offer complaint processes that are used for situations that may need to be ended by an outside interest. These are based on the court system meaning they are "Rights based".

ADR has also been input in all fifty states with a wide range of administrative provisions that offer different ways of dissolving conflict. While many states have adopted some version of the Uniform Arbitration Act, the Revised Uniform Arbitration Act, or the Uniform Mediation Act, there are also many laws and regulations that create or mandate various forms of dispute resolution unique or particular to the specific state in which it was enacted. There are multiple rules and laws associated with ADR so much that a database filled with these laws has been created. The primary goal of this compilation is to provide the researcher with free and easy access to each state's statutes addressing ADR on the map found here: ADR Laws Per State.

=== European Union ===
The European Union has established a harmonised legal framework for consumer alternative dispute resolution (ADR) through the Directive 2013/11/EU. This directive requires all EU Member States to ensure that consumers have access to ADR procedures for resolving contractual disputes with businesses. It is complemented by the Regulation (EU) No 524/2013, which established the Online Dispute Resolution (ODR) platform to support cross-border e-commerce transactions.

==== Structured negotiation ====
Structured negotiation is a type of collaborative and solution-driven alternative dispute resolution that differs from traditional ADR options in that it does not rely on a third-party mediator and is not initiated by a legal complaint. The process is often implemented in cases in which a party or parties seek injunctive relief. Structured negotiation has been used to arrange agreements that typically arise from would-be Americans with Disabilities Act (ADA) legal complaints. The technique can be contrasted with certain types of lawsuits often referred to as "drive-by lawsuits" where a long strings of lawsuits about the ADA are filed publicly by a single lawyer and settled quickly and confidentially, a practice which can undermine the struggle to adopt more inclusive accessibility practices.

Structured negotiation was first used in 1999 to settle the first legal agreement in the United States in which Citibank agreed to install Talking ATMs, and was quickly followed by similar agreements with several other financial institutions, including Bank of America and Wells Fargo. The Bank of America agreement in structured negotiation in 2000 was the first settlement in the United States to reference the Web Content Accessibility Guidelines (WCAG). Subsequently, structured negotiation has been used to settle various digital disability access and disability rights agreements with a variety of American businesses, universities, and local governments. Structured negotiation has also been used in other civil rights resolutions to alter business practices, including a policy by the Lyft ride-sharing service regarding the acceptance of LGBTQ passengers.

== See also ==
- Construction law
- Family therapy
- National Academy of Arbitrators
- Ombudsman
- Society of Construction Arbitrators
- Teen courts
- Turnaround ADR
- Federal Arbitration Act
