= Online dispute resolution =

Form of dispute resolution using technology

Online dispute resolution (ODR) is a form of dispute resolution which uses technology to facilitate the resolution of disputes between parties. It primarily involves negotiation, mediation or arbitration, or a combination of all three. In this respect it is often seen as being the online equivalent of alternative dispute resolution (ADR). However, ODR can also augment these traditional means of resolving disputes by applying innovative techniques and online technologies to the process.

ODR is a wide field, which may be applied to a range of disputes; from interpersonal disputes including consumer to consumer disputes (C2C) or marital separation; to court disputes and interstate conflicts. It is believed that efficient mechanisms to resolve online disputes will impact in the development of e-commerce. While the application of ODR is not limited to disputes arising out of business to consumer (B2C) online transactions, it seems to be particularly apt for these disputes, since it is logical to use the same medium (the internet) for the resolution of e-commerce disputes when parties are frequently located far from one another. Designing an appropriate ODR system requires attention to the interests of both consumers and companies as well as a deep understanding of the requirements of procedural justice.

== Definition ==
Dispute resolution techniques range from methods where parties have full control of the procedure, to methods where a third party is in control of both the process and the outcome. These primary methods of resolving disputes may be complemented with Information and Communication Technology (ICT). When the process is conducted mainly online it is referred to as ODR, i.e. to carry out most of the dispute resolution procedure online, including the initial filing, the neutral appointment, evidentiary processes, oral hearings if needed, online discussions, and even the rendering of binding settlements. Thus, ODR is a different medium to resolve disputes, from beginning to end, respecting due process principles.

ODR was born from the synergy between ADR and ICT, as a method for resolving disputes that were arising online, and for which traditional means of dispute resolution were inefficient or unavailable. The introduction of ICT in dispute resolution is currently growing to the extent that the difference between off-line dispute resolution and ODR is blurry. It has been observed that it is only possible to distinguish between proceedings that rely heavily on online technology and proceedings that do not. Some commentators have defined ODR exclusively as the use of ADR assisted principally with ICT tools. Although part of the doctrine incorporates a broader approach including online litigation and other sui generis forms of dispute resolution when they are assisted largely by ICT tools designed ad hoc. The latter definition seems more appropriate since it incorporates all methods used to resolve disputes that are conducted mainly through the use of ICT. Moreover, this concept is more consistent with the fact that ODR was born from the distinction with off-line dispute resolution processes.

In ODR, the information management is not only carried out by physical persons but also by computers and software. The assistance of ICT has been named by Katsh and Rifkin as the 'fourth party' because ODR is seen as an independent input to the management of the dispute. In addition to the two (or more) disputants and the third neutral party, the labelling of technology as the fourth party is a clear metaphor which stresses how technology can be as powerful as to change the traditional three side model. The fourth party embodies a range of capabilities in the same manner that the third party does. While the fourth party may at times take the place of the third party, i.e. automated negotiation, it will frequently be used by the third party as a tool for assisting the process.

The fourth party may do many things such as organize information, send automatic responses, shape writing communications in a more polite and constructive manner e.g. blocking foul language. In addition, it can monitor performance, schedule meetings, clarify interests and priorities, and so on. The assistance of the fourth party will increase the more technology advances, thus reducing the role of the third neutral party. It has been predicted that virtual "fourth party" avatars will be created to judge disputes and could become more skilled and intelligent over time. Katsh and Wing argue that ICT advance is occurring exponentially since ICT advance speeds up over the time. As a result, ODR processes are increasing in efficiency providing their disputants with greater advantages in terms of time saving and cost reductions.

=== Alternative definitions ===
In practice it is difficult to provide a self-contained definition of ODR, and given the pace of change it may not even be possible to do so. The use of technology usually involves the use of Internet-based communications technology at some stage, but ODR does not necessarily involve purely online processes – further, many could be replicated offline using pen and paper, or could be achieved using computers without Internet connections.

The range of terms and acronyms used to describe the field augments the confusion often felt by those unfamiliar with the new field of ODR. These terms include:

- Internet Dispute Resolution (iDR)
- Electronic Dispute Resolution (eDR)
- Electronic ADR (eADR)
- Online ADR (oADR)
- Technology Assisted Dispute Resolution (tADR)

ODR has emerged as the most used term in recent years.

It is uncertain whether these processes form a new discipline of ADR or a tool to aid existing methods of dispute resolution. The most appropriate view would be to view ODR as an interdisciplinary field of dispute resolution.

== Methods ==
=== Consensual ===
==== Automated negotiation ====
Automated negotiation relates to those methods in which the technology takes over (aspects of) a negotiation. Most of the ODR services in this area are so-called 'blind-bidding' services. This is a negotiation process designed to determine economic settlements for claims in which liability is not challenged. The blind bidding service may be thought of as a type of auction mechanism where some or all information about the players' bids is hidden.

A resolution is declared by the system at the end of a negotiating session if all parties have accepted one or more packages (of one or more proposed decision values) at the end of that session. Which of those packages becomes the agreement may be determined by an algorithm that rewards the party that moves soonest into the Zone of Agreement. This algorithm is thought to encourage concessions and quickly indicate that they are willing to accept a fair outcome. This is in contrast to the chilling effect that occurs with the more common split-the-difference algorithm.

Automated negotiation has proven to be particularly successful with insurance compensations and commercial activities. It is also a valuable tool for lawyers because they too can use it without revealing what they're willing to accept (unless an agreement is reached) and more importantly, without waiving their right to access the court, in the case that the negotiation is unsuccessful.

Thus, ODR is useful for resolving brick and mortar disputes that arise in businesses, insurance companies and municipalities, who are finding that ODR saves them money and time when dealing with B2C disputes.

==== Assisted negotiation ====
In assisted negotiation the technology assists the negotiation process between the parties. The technology has a similar role as the mediator in a mediation. The role of the technology may be to provide a certain process and/or to provide the parties with specific (evaluative) advice.

Mediators use information management skills encouraging parties to reach an amicable agreement by enabling them to communicate more effectively through the rephrasing of their arguments. Conciliation is similar to mediation, but the conciliator can propose solutions for the parties to consider before an agreement is reached. Also, assisted negotiation procedures are designed to improve parties' communications through the assistance of a third party or software. In fact, it has been argued that assisted negotiation, conciliation, and even facilitation, are just different words for mediation. The major advantages of these processes, when used online, are their informality, simplicity and user friendliness.

- SquareTrade

The leading ODR provider for consumer mediation was until recently SquareTrade. It was contracted by a number of market places, the largest of which was eBay. However, due to changes in the eBay feedback system in May 2008, SquareTrade decided to stop resolving eBay feedback disputes from June 2008. SquareTrade continues providing services to eBay users, such as warranty services and the trustmark program. It appears that in the last year these services have been taken over by eBay and PayPal dispute resolution services, but results on these services are still scarce.

SquareTrade did not handle disputes between users and eBay, only between sellers and buyers on eBay. SquareTrade offered two levels of dispute resolution: assisted negotiation and mediation. SquareTrade was only used after eBay's own consumer satisfaction process. In the last few years, SquareTrade has resolved millions of disputes across 120 countries in 5 different languages.

The advantage of dealing with large number of disputes is that the same issues arise many times, thus it is possible to divide the disputes into different sections. The SquareTrade process started when a buyer or a seller filed a complaint. To do so, the claimant was asked to fill out a web-based standard claim form that identified the type of dispute and presented a list of common solutions, from which the claimant selected the ones that he agreed to. The other party was contacted by email where he was informed about the SquareTrade process, and asked whether he wished to participate. The parties were often keen on participating because this was the only manner by which the buyer could get redress and the seller positive feedback. The other party filed the response, selecting the resolutions. If both parties agreed on the same resolution, the dispute was resolved. When an agreement could not be reached, parties were put into a negotiation environment. A web interface was used to shape communications into a constructive and polite negotiation. This was achieved with software tools that limited the free text space, encouraged the proposition of agreements, set deadlines and even shaped the tone of exchanges.

This software was the key element of the process because it took over some of the expertise of the third party. This process could be defined as 'mediated negotiation'. According to Rabinovich-Einy, SquareTrade technology,

"intervenes in the negotiations between the parties and, by allowing parties to formulate and reformulate the problem and the solution, performs some of what would be associated with a mediator's role, moving the parties from a problem mode to a solution stance."

Most disputes (over 80 percent) were resolved during the first two stages, which was an impressive success rate given that in the majority of cases, the parties had already been involved in some type of failed direct negotiation before engaging with SquareTrade. In the rest of the cases a mediator could be requested for a nominal fee, acting as an expert evaluator or conciliator that made settlement proposals to the parties. This second stage involved the payment of a US$29.95 fee. According to SquareTrade, "[a] sophisticated case management technology enables mediators to handle lower to medium-value consumer disputes in an efficient cost effective manner." The appointed mediator proposed solutions, if required by the parties to do so. Agreements were always kept confidential by SquareTrade, and became binding as contracts.

SquareTrade has proven that processes such as online negotiation and online mediation can be efficient tools to resolve e-commerce disputes. One of the key issues for the success of SquareTrade was the simplicity and convenience of this service. In addition, SquareTrade services to eBay were concentrated on a reduced number of issues, such as delays, bad descriptions and negative feedback. This made possible the development of an efficient automatic process that enhanced online negotiation. The success of consensual and automated processes depends on the nature of the dispute, the accuracy of information provided, and the capability of the software or the third neutral party in assessing and evaluating the facts and evidence. SquareTrade was particularly effective because it introduced incentives that encourage parties' participation; i.e. both parties wished to resolve their dispute: sellers want to obtain positive feedback and buyers want redress. In general terms, widening the scope of clients' claims to the global market invites extra variables to play: cultural differences, such as high and low culture perceptions and the cross-cultural variations of what constitutes the customer satisfaction experience.

==== Expedient Non-Adjudicative Online Resolution ====
Another form of alternative dispute resolution prioritizes expedience and dispenses with adjudication all together, in recognition of the litigants' desire to simply dispose of the matter as quickly as possible. By removing any hint of adjudication, services (e.g., One Day Decisions) "fast track" a version similar to blind bidding which is restricted privately to the two parties and an algorithm determines a fair value to be accepted by each party. Unlike other services, once accepted by both parties, the settlement amount is applied to the issuance of a Certificate of Final Resolution which both parties accept as irrevocable proof of resolution and final settlement. By avoiding adjudication, expedient non-adjudicative online resolution saves litigants time in court, time away from work and other fees and expenses, while protecting each from ancillary damage: The winning party generally collects more of his disputed amount and the losing party suffers no credit damage from having a judgment entered against him. Expedient Non-Adjudicative Online Resolution is generally utilized in cases that might otherwise be heard in small claims or limited civil matters.

==== Crowdjustice ====
As an alternative to private, professional settlement, the concept of crowdjustice has recently taken shape as a means to leverage social norms and the wisdom of crowds to determine the outcome of a dispute.

=== Adjudicative ===
==== Online arbitration ====
Arbitration is a process where a neutral third party (arbitrator) delivers a decision which is final, and binding on both parties. It can be defined as a quasi-judicial procedure because the award replaces a judicial decision. Arbitrators can be current or former trial judges, but that is not a requirement. However, in an arbitration procedure parties usually can choose the arbitrator and the basis on which the arbitrator makes the decision. Furthermore, it is less formal than litigation, though more than any other consensual process. It is often used to resolve businesses' disputes because this procedure is noted for being private and faster than litigation. Once the procedure is initiated parties cannot abandon it, unless they both agree to discontinuing it (e.g. when they reached a settlement - although usually the settlement will be communicated to the arbitral tribunal and an award rendered on this basis). Another feature of arbitration is that the award is enforceable almost everywhere due to the wide adoption of the 1958 New York Convention on the Recognition and Enforcement of Foreign Arbitral Awards. Moreover, arbitral awards prove frequently easier to enforce than court decisions from overseas.

The majority of legal studies on online arbitration agree that, neither law, nor arbitral principles, prevent arbitration from taking place online. However, there may be several aspects in online arbitration that need to be regulated. Although online arbitration seems admissible under the New York Convention and the E-Commerce Directive, this is arguably an assumption by most commentators, rather than a legal statement. Since arbitration is based on a contractual agreement between the parties, an online process without a regulatory framework may generate a significant number of challenges from consumers and other weaker parties if due process cannot be assured. Currently, most arbitration providers allow parties to carry out online only part of the arbitration process, e.g. parties may download claim forms, the submission of documents through standard email or secure web interface, the use of telephone hearings, etc. A key element of arbitration is the right for a party to question the witnesses of the other parties and that can now be done at low cost with an online audio and video hearing process using newer technologies such as Skype Premium or Google Hangouts. Cross examination of remote witnesses regulated by the arbitrator can ensure the fairness and maintain a judicial quality for the online arbitration process.

The main challenge for online arbitration is that if judicial enforcement is required then it partly defeats the purpose of having an online process. Alternatively, some processes have developed self-enforcement mechanisms such as technical enforcements, black lists and trustmarks.

==== The Uniform Domain Names Dispute Resolution Policy (UDRP) ====
Traditionally arbitration resolves disputes by delivering a decision that will be legally binding, i.e. enforceable by the courts in the same manner as a judgment. Non binding arbitration processes may also be effective when using ODR tools because they often encourage settlements by imparting a dose of reality and objectivity. In addition, self-enforcement measures may reinforce the efficacy of non binding processes. The most significant example is the Uniform Domain Name Dispute Resolution Policy (UDRP) created by the Internet Corporation for Assigned Names and Numbers (ICANN). Some commentators have referred to the UDRP as an administrative process. In any case, the UDRP has developed a transparent global ODR process that allows trade mark owners to fight efficiently cybersquatting. The UDRP is used to resolve disputes between trade mark owners and those who have registered a domain name in bad faith for the purpose of reselling it for a profit, or taking advantage of the reputation of a trademark.

Trademark owners accessing the UDRP must prove to the panel three circumstances:

1. similarity of the domain name to the trade or service mark;
2. lack of rights or legitimate interest in the registered domain name;
3. bad faith in the registration and use of the domain name.

However, the UDRP presents its own problems that show the challenges that an online adversarial system applied to mainstream e-commerce disputes would have. The main worry is that the evaluation of the panel decisions often shows a lack of unanimous consensus in the interpretation of the UDRP. This may be due to a number of reasons, such as the lack of an appellative review and panels composed by members from a multitude of jurisdictions and informed by different legal traditions.

On the other side, it is undeniable what ICANN with the UDRP has achieved in developing an effective ODR procedure based on contractual adherence that allows trade mark owners to transfer or cancel a domain that blatantly violates IP rights. The UDRP providers have dealt efficiently with over 30,000 domain name disputes. Their success derives from two aspects: First, the UDRP deals only with blatant disputes, which are abusive registrations made in bad faith in order to take advantage of the reputation of existing trademarks. Secondly, it has incorporated a self-enforcement mechanism, which transfers and cancels domain names without the need for judicial involvement. This is a positive accomplishment for the development of e-commerce because it favours consumers' confidence in the Internet by reducing the number of fraudulent registered domain names.

==== Chargebacks ====
One of the main focuses of e-commerce up until recently has been related to secure payments. Chargebacks is a remedy used to reverse transactions made with credit or debit cards when a fraudulent use has occurred, or when there is a violation of the contract terms. This method is very popular among online consumers since this is the main mechanism to transfer money online. In addition, consumers are not required to give evidence to cancel a payment. The vendor has the burden of proving that the merchandise or service was given according to the contract terms. Once this is proved the bank makes effective the payment to the vendor.

Chargebacks are largely used around the world by banks and the main credit card suppliers i.e. Visa, MasterCard and American Express. Yet, the coverage of debit and credit cards varies considerably amongst different countries. Commonly, debit cardholders have fewer protections than credit card holders, but it also varies depending on the jurisdiction.

It is then not surprising why credit cards are the major source of payments for consumers in e-commerce. They provide a remedy that reverses all transactions when a fraudulent use has occurred, or when there is a violation of the contract terms. However this method has limitations; it offers one single remedy (the return of the payment), and not all disputes imply a breach of contract or fraud.

Similarly, online payment providers, like PayPal.com, retain temporarily the money paid by a buyer when the latter makes a complaint within 45 days after the payment was made. PayPal.com holds the money until the dispute is settled, but only in those cases where the merchandise did not arrive, or the description of the product was significantly different from the product itself. In these circumstances PayPal.com acts akin to an online arbitrator. However, in those circumstances where the seller takes away the money from his account before the buyer makes the claim, PayPal.com will not be responsible for the buyer's loss. Despite this, PayPal is in a very strong position since in most cases it is able to freeze the amount of money and resolve the dispute providing an instant and effective enforcement.

Overall, chargebacks intends to balance the inequality of power between consumers and businesses. It is regarded as a very efficient tool for consumers because the speed, accessibility and lack of charge for their clients, who would just have to notify their banks or card issuers to cancel a transaction. Thus, Edwards and Wilson suggested that it would be advisable to focus on developing chargebacks and other soft ODR methods because they are very effective amongst mainstream consumers. By contrast, the existing processes are considered largely inefficient and not transparent among businesses because puts businesses in bad light since the onus of the proof rests on them.

== In the Courts ==
Many courts throughout the world are now incorporating ODR into their judicial procedures. The idea is to add a "virtual door" to the multi-door courthouse and promote access to justice.

== In the European Union ==
=== European Small Claims Procedure ===
Small claims procedures provide a middle ground between formal litigation and ADR, where disputes involving small value claims can be resolved in courts faster, cheaply, and less formally. The main limitation of small claims procedures is that they are restricted to particular jurisdictions. In order to overcome this limitation the European Commission has adopted a regulation for a European Small Claims Procedure (ESCP) in 2007. Implementation of the ESCP was expected in all EU Member States by January 2009. The ESCP is predominantly a written procedure that deals with claims under €2,000 arising in cross-border disputes. Its main advantage is that it provides for the enforcement of decisions in any of the member states without the need to go through the formal mutual recognition of judgements (exequatur).

Great expectations are put on the ESCP, which in order to deliver a cost-effective process will have to rely on ICT. This will be a significant challenge, because unlike the UDRP, which is becoming a fully online process for dealing with specific complaints, the ESCP will deal with a variety of civil and commercial disputes. The objective of the ESCP was the creation of a cost efficient procedure applicable to small value claims in cross-border disputes. This objective could only be achieved by using a written procedure, assisted by electronic forms such as emails and videoconferencing as foreseen by the ESCP.

The Regulation allows the use of new technologies in transferring information and evidence between the courts of the different member states. But, it will be the EC Member States who will decide, through their own regulations, which specific means of communication are acceptable in their courts. Given that the ESCP is a regulation and not a directive, it is arguable whether it has left too many aspects to the discretion of member states, which could call into question the legal certainty expected from a European regulation. Nevertheless, it can be expected that, in due time, electronic communications will reach every possible and reasonable aspect of the judicial procedure to assist in the resolution of online as well as off-line B2C disputes.

With the implementation of the ESCP an institutionalized ODR may emerge in Europe in 2009. Many disputes will be resolved by judges communicating with parties through the Internet. It is expected that the ESCP will contribute to mitigate the legitimacy problem which also hampers the emergence of ODR. Perhaps, within the EU, where we have concern for the fairness of private procedures (i.e. restrictions in consumer arbitration) the ESCP may contribute to increase trust in ODR processes.

=== ODR Platform ===
The European Commission established an Online Dispute Resolution Platform (ODR Platform) on 15 February 2016. This platform or portal is available for use by consumers located in the European Union, or in Norway, Iceland or Liechtenstein, to assist in settling disputes with traders out of court. The platform is accessible at https://ec.europa.eu/consumers/odr/main/index.cfm. In addition, the Platform may be used by traders to resolve a dispute with a consumer who resides in Belgium, Germany, Luxemburg or Poland. On 20 July 2025, the European Online Dispute Resolution Platform was discontinued.

== In China ==
China's 2018 E-Commerce Law establishes the principle that "the state regulates the platforms, and the platforms regulate online businesses". Among other provisions, the law states in Articles 58-63 that platforms should establish online dispute resolution systems among other online institutions.

== In India ==
Online dispute resolution (ODR) in India is in its infancy stage and it is gaining prominence day by day. With the enactment of Information Technology Act, 2000 in India, e-commerce and e-governance have been given a formal and legal recognition in India. Even the traditional arbitration law of India has been reformulated and now India has Arbitration and Conciliation Act, 1996 in place that is satisfying the harmonised standards of UNCITRAL Model. The amendment made in theCode of Civil Procedure, 1908 by introducing section 89 was made to provide methods of alternative dispute resolution (ADR) in India.

With a rapid growth of e-commerce in India, the number of disputes related to online transactions is on the rise. The existing dispute redressal mechanisms are falling short of the business growth and customer expectations. Conventional redressal systems require presence of the parties, and are not in synch with modern online platforms. The Department of Consumer Affairs, Government of India has taken note of this and has planned to roll out an Online Consumer Dispute Resolution platform that follows the best practices emerging in the global eCommerce arena.

== Standards of practice ==
- National Centre for Technology and Dispute Resolution, Standards of Practice.
- US Federal Trade Commission and Department of Commerce.
- Canadian Working Group on Electronic Commerce and Consumers.
- Australian National Alternative Dispute Resolution Advisory Council (NADRAC).
- Alliance for Global Business.
- Global Business Dialogue on Electronic Commerce.
- Transatlantic Consumer Dialogue.
- Consumers International.
- European Consumers' Organisation (BEUC).
- International Chamber of Commerce (ICC).
- American Bar Association.
