= Arbitration and Conciliation Act, 1996 =

Act of the Parliament of India

Parliament of India
- Long title: An Act to consolidate and amend the law relating to domestic arbitration, international commercial arbitration and enforcement of foreign arbitral awards as also to define the law relating to conciliation and for matters connected therewith or incidental thereto.
- Citation: Act No. 26 of 1996
- Territorial extent: whole of India
- Enacted by: Parliament of India
- Enacted: 16 August 1996
- Commenced: 22 August 1996

Repeals
- Arbitration (Protocol and Convention) Act, 1937 (6 of 1937); Arbitration Act, 1940 (10 of 1940); Foreign Awards (Recognition and Enforcement) Act, 1961 (45 of 1961); Arbitration and Conciliation (Third) Ordinance, 1996 (Ord.27 of 1996)

Amended by
- Arbitration and Conciliation (Amendment) Act, 2015 (Act 3 of 2016); Arbitration and Conciliation (Amendment) Act, 2019 (Act 33 of 2019); Arbitration and Conciliation (Amendment) Act, 2021 (Act 3 of 2021)
- Status: In force (amended)

The Arbitration and Conciliation Act, 1996 is an Act that regulates domestic arbitration in India. It was amended in 2015 and 2019.

The Government of India decided to amend the Arbitration and Conciliation Act, 1996 by introducing the Arbitration and Conciliation (Amendment) Bill, 2015 in the Parliament. In an attempt to make arbitration a preferred mode of settlement of commercial disputes and making India a hub of international commercial arbitration, the President of India on 23 October 2015 promulgated an Ordinance (Arbitration and Conciliation (Amendment) Ordinance, 2015) amending the Arbitration and Conciliation Act, 1996. The Union Cabinet chaired by the Prime Minister, had given its approval for amendments to the Arbitration and Conciliation Bill, 2015

== 2015 Amendment ==
The following are the salient features of the new ordinance, introduced in 2015:

The first and foremost amendment introduced by the ordinance, is with respect to definition of expression ' Court '. The amended law makes a clear distinction between an international commercial arbitration and domestic arbitration with regard to the definition of 'Court'. In so far as domestic arbitration is concerned, the definition of "Court" is the same as was in the 1996 Act, however, for the purpose of international commercial arbitration, 'Court' has been defined to mean only High Court of competent jurisdiction. Accordingly, in an international commercial arbitration, as per the new law, district court will have no jurisdiction and the parties can expect speedier and efficacious determination of any issue directly by the High court which is better equipped in terms of handling commercial disputes.
Through the amendment, a proviso to Section 2(2) has been added which envisages that subject to the agreement to the contrary, Section 9 (interim measures), Section 27(taking of evidence), and Section 37(1)(a), 37(3) shall also apply to international commercial arbitration, even if the seat of arbitration is outside India, meaning thereby that the new law has tried to strike a kind of balance between the situations created by the judgments of Bhatia International and Balco v. Kaiser. Now Section 2(2) envisages that Part-I shall apply where the place of arbitration is in India and that provisions of Sections 9, 27, 37(1) (a) and 37 (3) shall also apply to international commercial arbitration even if the seat of arbitration is outside India unless parties to the arbitration agreement have agreed to the contrary.
Section 8, which deals with 'Reference of parties to the dispute to arbitration', was amended. In Section 8, which mandates any judicial authority to refer the parties to arbitration in respect of an action brought before it, which is subject matter of arbitration agreement . The sub-section(1) has been amended envisaging that notwithstanding any judgment, decree or order of the Supreme Court or any court, the judicial authority shall refer the parties to the arbitration unless it finds that prima facie no valid arbitration agreement exists. A provision has also been made enabling the party, who applies for reference of the matter to arbitration, to apply to the Court for a direction of production of the arbitration agreement or certified copy thereof in the event the parties applying for reference of the disputes to arbitration is not in the possession of the arbitration agreement and the opposite party has the same.
Lastly Section 9, dealing with 'Interim Measures' was also amended. The amended section envisages that if the Court passes an interim measure of protection under the section before commencement of arbitral proceedings, then the arbitral proceedings shall have to commence within a period of 90 days from the date of such order or within such time as the Court may determine. Also, that the Court shall not entertain any application under section 9 unless it finds that circumstances exist which may not render the remedy under Section 17 efficacious. In Home Care Retail Marts Pvt. Ltd. v. Haresh N. Sanghavi, the Supreme Court of India held that even an unsuccessful party in arbitration can seek interim relief under Section 9 of the Arbitration and Conciliation Act, 1996 after the arbitral award and before its enforcement. The Court clarified that the expression “a party” includes both successful and unsuccessful parties to the arbitration agreement.

Section 16, which deals with the competence of an arbitral tribunal to rule on its own jurisdiction, provides that an arbitral tribunal may determine objections concerning the existence or validity of the arbitration agreement. The provision incorporates the principle of kompetenz-kompetenz and recognizes the separability of the arbitration agreement from the underlying contract. Accordingly, a decision by the arbitral tribunal that the underlying contract is null and void does not, by itself, invalidate the arbitration clause.

Under Section 16, a party challenging the jurisdiction of the arbitral tribunal is generally required to raise the objection no later than the submission of the statement of defence. Where the objection concerns the tribunal exceeding the scope of its authority, the objection is to be raised as soon as the matter alleged to be beyond its authority arises during the proceedings.

.
