= Code of Civil Procedure (India) =

Code of Civil Procedure, 1908

Code of Civil Procedure, 1908

Imperial Legislative Council
- Long title: An Act to consolidate and amend the laws relating to the procedure of the Courts of Civil Judicature.
- Citation: Act No. 5 of 1908
- Enacted by: Imperial Legislative Council
- Enacted: 21 March 1908
- Commenced: 1 January 1909

Repeals
- Civil Procedure Code, 1882
- Status: In force

The Code of Civil Procedure, 1908 is a procedural law related to the administration of civil proceedings in India.

The Code is divided into two parts: the first part contains 158 sections and the second part contains the First Schedule, which has 51 Orders and Rules. The sections provide provisions related to general principles of jurisdiction whereas the Orders and Rules prescribe procedures and method that govern civil suit or proceedings in India.

== History ==
To give uniformity to Civil Procedure, the Legislative Council of India enacted Code of Civil Procedure, 1858, which received the assent of Governor-General on 23 March 1859. The Code however, was not applicable to the Supreme Court in the Presidency Towns and to the Presidency Small Cause Courts. It did not meet the challenges and was replaced by Code of Civil Procedure Code, 1877. But still it did not fulfill the requirements of time and large amendments were introduced. In 1882, the Code of Civil Procedure, 1882 was introduced. With passing of time it was felt that it needed flexibility for timeliness and effectiveness. To meet these problems Code of Civil Procedure, 1908 was enacted. Though it has been amended a number of times, it has withstood the test of time.

== Amendments ==
The Code of Civil Procedure was substantially amended in the year 2002. The main purpose of the Amendment to the code was to ensure speedy disposal of civil cases governed under the Act.

=== Civil Procedure Code (Amendment) Act 2015 ===
Keeping in view the establishment of Commercial Court and the provisions thereof, Civil Procedure Code (Amendment) Act, 2016 was enacted. These provisions are applicable to commercial disputes of specified value. The act clarified that the provisions of the Civil Procedure Code as amended by the Act would have an overriding effect over any rules of the High Court or of the amendments made by the state government concerned.

The Code of Civil Procedure, 1908 was further amended in the year 2018.

== Arrangement of Sections ==
=== Preliminary (Section 1 to 8) ===
Section	Description
1	Short Title, Commencement and extent
2	Definition
3	Subordination of Courts
4	Saving Clause
5	Application of the Code to Revenue Courts
6	Pecuniary Jurisdiction
7	Provincial Small Cause Courts
8	Presidency Small Cause Courts

=== Part 1- Suits in General ===
==== Jurisdiction of the Courts and Res-Judicata (Section 9 to 14) ====
Section	Description
9	Courts to try all civil suits unless barred
10	Stay of Suit
11	Res-Judicata
12	Bar to further suit
13	When foreign suit not conclusive
14	Presumption as to foreign judgements

==== Place of Suing (Section 15 to 25) ====
Section	Description
15	Court in which suits to be instituted.
16	Suits to be instituted where subject-matter situate.
17	Suits for immovable property situate within jurisdiction of different Courts.
18	Place of Institution of suit where local limits of jurisdiction of Courts are uncertain.
19	Suits for compensation for wrongs to person or movables.
20	Other suits to be instituted where defendants reside or cause of action arises.
21	Objections to jurisdiction.
21A	Bar on suit to set aside decree on objection as to place of suing.
22	Power to transfer suits which may be instituted in more than one Court.
23	To what Court application lies.
24	General power of transfer and withdrawal.
25	Power of Supreme Court to transfer suits, etc.

==== Institution of Suit (Section 26 to 33) ====
Section	Description
26	Institution of Suits
27	Summons to defendants.
28	Service of summons where defendant resides in another State.
29	Service of foreign summonses.
30	Power to order discovery and the like.
31	Summons to witness.
32	Penalty for default.

==== Judgement and Decree ====
Section 33 - Judgement and Decree

==== Interest ====
Section 34 - Interest

==== Costs (Section 35, 35A and 35B) ====
Section	Description
35	Costs
35A	Compensatory costs in respect of false or vexatious claims or defenses.
35B	Costs for causing delay.

=== Part 2- Execution ===
==== General (Section 36 and 37) ====
Section	Description
36	Application to orders.
37	Definition of Court which passed a decree.

==== Courts by which decrees may be executed (Section 38 to 46) ====
Section	Description
38	Court by which decree may be executed.
39	Transfer of decree.
40	Transfer of decree to Court in another State.
41	Result of execution proceedings to be certified.
42	Powers of Court in executing transferred decree.
43	Execution of decrees passed by Civil Courts in places to which this Code does not extend.
44	Execution of decrees passed by Revenue Courts in places to which this Code does not extend.
44A	Execution of decrees passed by Courts in reciprocating territory
45	Execution of decrees outside India.
46	Precepts.

==== Questions to be determined by the Court executing decree. ====
Section 47 - Questions to be determined by the Court executing decree.

==== Limit of time for execution ====
Section 48 - [Repealed]

==== Transferees and Legal Representatives ====
Section	Description
49	Transferees.
50	Legal representative.

==== Procedure in Execution (Section 51 to 54) ====
Section	Description
51	Powers of Court to enforce execution.
52	Enforcement of decree against legal representative.
53	Liability of ancestral property.
54	Partition of estate or separation of share.

==== Arrest and Detention (Section 55 to 59) ====
Section	Description
55	Arrest and detention.
56	Prohibition of arrest or detention of women in execution of decree for money.
57	Subsistence-allowance.
58	Detention and release.
59	Release on ground of illness.

==== Attachment (Section 60 to 64) ====
Section	Description
60	Property liable to attachment and sale in execution of decree.
61	Partial exemption of agricultural produce.
62	Seizure of property in dwelling house.
63	Property attached in execution of decrees of several Courts.
64	Private alienation of property after attachment to be void.

==== Sale (Section 65, 66 and 67) ====
Section	Description
65	Purchaser's Title
66	Repealed
67	Power for State Government to make rules as to sales of land in execution of decrees for payment of money.

==== Delegation to Collector of Power to execute decrees against immovable property. ====
Section 68 to 72 - Repealed.

==== Distribution of Assets ====
Section 73 - Proceeds of execution-sale to be rateably distributed among decree-holders.

==== Resistance to Execution ====
Section 74 - Resistance to execution.

=== Part 3- Incidental Proceedings ===
==== Commissions (Section 75 to 78) ====
Section	Description
75	Power of Court to issue commissions.
76	Commission to another Court.
77	Letter of request.
78	Commissions issued by foreign Courts.

=== Part 4- Suits in Particular Cases ===
==== Suits by or Against the Government or Public Officers in their Official Capacity ====
Section	Description
79	Suits by or against Government.
80	Notice.
81	Exemption from arrest and personal appearance.
82	Execution of decree.

==== Suits by Aliens and by or against Foreign Rulers, Ambassadors and Envoys ====
Section	Description
83	When aliens may sue.
84	When foreign States may sue.
85	Persons specially appointed by Government to prosecute or defend on behalf of foreign Rulers.
86	Suits against foreign Rulers, Ambassadors and Envoys.
87	Style of foreign Rulers as parties to suits.
87A	Definitions of “foreign State” and “Ruler”.

==== Suits against Rulers of Former Indian States ====
Section 87B- Application of sections 85 and 86 to Rulers of former Indian States.

==== Interpleader ====
Section 88- Where interpleader-suit may be instituted.

=== Part 5- Special Proceedings ===
==== Arbitration ====
Section 89- Settlement of disputes outside the Court.

==== Special Case ====
Section 90- Power to state case for opinion of Court.

==== Public Nuisances and other Wrongful Acts affecting the public ====
Section	Description
91	Public nuisances and other wrongful acts affecting the public.
92	Public charities.
93	Exercise of powers of Advocate-General outside presidency-towns.

=== Part 6- Supplemental Proceedings ===
Section	Description
94	Supplemental proceedings.
95	Compensation for obtaining arrest, attachment or injunction on insufficient ground.

=== Part 7- Appeals ===
==== Appeals from Original Decrees ====
Section	Description
96	Appeal from original decree.
97	Appeal from final decree where no appeal from preliminary decree.
98	Decision where appeal heard by two or more Judges.
99	No decree to be reversed or modified for error or irregularity not affecting merits or jurisdiction.
99A	No order under section 47 to be reversed or modified unless decision of the case is prejudicially affected.

==== Appeals from Appellate Decrees ====
Section	Description
100	Second Appeal.
100A	No further appeal in certain cases.
101	Second appeal on no other grounds.
102	No second appeal in certain cases.
103	Power of High Court to determine issues of fact.

==== Appeals from Orders ====
Section	Description
104	Orders from which appeal lies.
105	Other Orders.
106	What Courts to hear appeals.

==== General Provisions relating to Appeals ====
Section	Description
107	Powers of Appellate Court and appleant.
108	Procedure in appeals from appellate decrees and orders.

==== Appeals to the Supreme Court ====
Section	Description
109	When appeals lie to the Supreme Court
110	Omitted
111	Omitted
111A	Omitted
112	Savings.

=== Part 8- Reference, review and revision ===
Section	Description
113	Reference to High Court
114	Review
115	Revision

=== Part 9- Special Provisions relating to the High Courts not being the Court of Judicial Commissioner ===
Section	Description
116	Part to apply only to certain High Courts.
117	Application of Code to High Courts.
118	Execution of decree before ascertainment of costs.
119	Unauthorised persons not to address Court.
120	Provisions not applicable to High Court in original civil jurisdiction.

=== Part 10- Rules ===
Section	Description
121	Effect of rules in First Schedule.
122	Power of certain High Courts to make rules.
123	Constitution of Rules Committees in certain States.
124	Committee to report to High Court.
125	Power of other High Courts to make rules.
126	Rules to be subject to approval.
127	Publication of rules.
128	Matters for which rules may provide
129	Power of High Courts to make rules as to their original civil procedure.
130	Power of other High Courts to make rules as to matters other than procedure
131	Publication of rules.

=== Part 11- Miscellaneous ===
Section	Description
132	Exemption of certain women from personal appearance.
133	Exemption of other persons.
134	Arrest other than in execution of decree.
135	Exemption from arrest under civil process.
135A	Exemption of members of legislative bodies from arrest and detention under civil process.
136	Procedure where person to be arrested or property to be attached is outside district.
137	Language of subordinate Courts.
138	Power of High Court to require evidence to be recorded in English.
139	Oath on affidavit by whom to be administered.
140	Assessors in causes of salvage, etc.
141	Miscellaneous proceedings.
142	Orders and notices to be in writing.
143	Postage.
144	Application for restitution.
145	Enforcement of liability of surety.
146	Proceedings by or against representatives.
147	Consent or agreement by persons under disability.
148	Enlargement of Time.
148A	Right to lodge a caveat.
149	Power to make up deficiency of court-fees.
150	Transfer of business.
151	Saving of inherent powers of Court.
152	Amendment of judgments, decrees or orders.
153	General power to amend.
153A	Power to amend decree or order where appeal is summarily dismissed.
153B	Place of trial to be deemed to be open Court.
154	Repealed.
155	Repealed.
156	Repealed.
157	Continuance of orders under repealed enactments.
158	Reference to Code of Civil Procedure and other repealed enactments.

== Arrangement of Schedules ==
=== Order 1- Parties to Suits ===
Rule	Description
1	Who may be joined as plaintiffs.
2	Power of Court to order separate trial.
3	Who may be joined as defendants.
3A	Power to order separate trials where joinder of defendants may embarrass or delay trial.
4	Court may give judgment for or against one or more of joint parties.
5	Defendant need not be interested in all the relief claimed.
6	Joinder of parties liable on same contract.
7	When plaintiff in doubt from whom redress is to be sought.
8	One person may sue or defend on behalf of all in same interest.
8A	Power of Court to permit a person or body of persons to present opinion or to take part in the proceedings.
9	Misjoinder and non-joinder.
10	Suit in name of wrong plaintiff. Court may strike out or add parties. Where defendant added, plaint to be amended.
10A	Power of Court to request any pleader to address it.
11	Conduct of suit.
12	Appearance of one of several plaintiffs or defendants for others.
13	Objections as to non-joinder or misjoinder.

=== Order 2- Frame of Suit ===
Rule	Description
1	Frame of suit.
2	Suit to include the whole claim. Relinquishment of part of claim. Omission to sue for one of several reliefs.
3	Joinder of causes of action.
4	Only certain claims to be joined for recovery of immovable property.
5	Claims by or against executor, administrator or heir.
6	Power of Court to order separate trials.
7	Objections as to misjoinder.

=== Order 3- Recognized Agents and Pleaders ===
Rule	Description
1	Appearances, etc., may be in person, by recognised agent or by pleader.
2	Recognised agents.
3	Service of process on recognised agent.
4	Appointment of pleader.
5	Service of process on pleader.
6	Agent to accept service. Appointment to be in writing and to be filed in Court.

=== Order 4- Institution of suits ===
Rule	Description
1	Suit to be commenced by plaint.
2	Register of suits.

=== Order 5- Issue and Service of Summons ===
==== Issue of summons ====
Rule	Description
1	Summons.
2	Copy of plaint annexed to summons.
3	Court may order defendant or plaintiff to appear in person.
4	No party to be ordered to appear in person unless resident within certain limits.
5	Summons to be either to settle issues or for final disposal.
6	Fixing day for appearance of defendant.
7	Summons to order defendant to produce documents relied on by him.
8	On issue of summons for final disposal, defendant to be directed to produce his witnesses.

==== Service of Summons ====
Rule	Description
9	Delivery of summons by Court.
9A	Summons given to the plaintiff for service.
10	Mode of service.
11	Service on several defendants.
12	Service to be on defendant in person when practicable, or on his agent.
13	Service on agent by whom defendant carries on business.
14	Service on agent in charge in suits for immovable property.
15	Where service may be on an adult member of defendant's family.
16	Person served to sign acknowledgement.
17	Procedure when defendant refuses to accept service, or cannot be found.
18	Endorsement of time and manner of service.
19	Examination of serving officer.
19A	[Omitted.].
20	Substituted service. Effect of substituted service. Where service substituted, time for appearance to be fixed.
20A	[Repealed.].
21	Service of summons where defendant resides within jurisdiction of another Court.
22	Service within presidency-towns of summons issued by Courts outside.
23	Duty of Court to which summons is sent.
24	Service on defendant in prison.
25	Service where defendant resides out of India and has no agent.
26	Service in foreign territory through Political Agent or Court.
26A	Summonses to be sent to officers to foreign countries.
27	Service on civil public officer or on servant of railway company or local authority.
28	Service on soldiers, sailors or airmen.
29	Duty of person to whom summons is delivered or sent for service.
30	Substitution of letter for summons.

=== Order 6- Pleadings Generally ===
Rule	Description
1	Pleading.
2	Pleading to state material facts and not evidence.
3	Forms of pleading.
4	Particulars to be given where necessary.
5	[Omitted.].
6	Condition precedent.
7	Departure.
8	Denial of Contract.
9	Effect of document to be stated.
10	Malice, knowledge, etc.
11	Notice.
12	Implied Contract or relation.
13	Presumptions of law.
14	Pleading to be signed
14A	Address for service of notice.
15	Verification of pleadings.
16	Striking out pleadings.
17	Amendment of pleadings.
18	Failure to amend after order.

=== Order 7- Plaint and Documents replied on in Plaint. ===
Rule	Description
1	Particulars to be contained in plaint.
2	In money suits.
3	Where the subject-matter of the suit is immovable property.
4	When plaintiff sues as representative.
5	Defendant's interest and liability to be shown.
6	Grounds of exemption from limitation law.
7	Relief to be specifically stated.
8	Relief founded on separate grounds.
9	Procedure on admitting plaint.
10	Return of plaint. Procedure on returning plaint.
10A	Power of Court to fix a date of appearance in the Court where plaint is to be filed after its return.
10B	Power of appellate Court to transfer suit to the proper Court.
11	Rejection of plaint.
12	Procedure on rejecting plaint.
13	Where rejection of plaint does not preclude presentation of fresh plaint.
14	Production of document on which plaintiff sues or relies.
15	[Omitted.].
16	Suits on lost negotiable instruments.
17	Production of shop-book. Original entry to be marked and returned.
18	[Omitted.].

=== Order 8- Written statement, set-off and counter-claim ===
Rule	Description
1	Written statement.
1A	Duty of defendant to produce documents upon which relief is claimed or relied upon by him.
2	New facts must be specially pleaded.
3	Denial to be specific.
4	Evasive denial.
5	Specific denial.
6	Particulars of set-off to be given in written statement. Effect of set-off.
6A	Counter-claim by defendant.
6B	Counter-claim to be stated.
6C	Exclusion of counter-claim.
6D	Effect of discontinuance of suit.
6E	Default of plaintiff to reply to counter-claim.
6F	Relief to defendant where counter-claim succeeds.
6G	Rules relating to written statement to apply.
7	Defence or set-off founded upon separate grounds.
8	Relief founded on separate grounds.
8A	[Omitted.].
9	Subsequent pleadings.
10	Procedure when party fails to present written statement called for by Court.

=== Order 9- Appearance of Parties and Consequence of non-Appearance | Setting aside Decree ex-parte. ===
Rule	Description
1	Parties to appear on day fixed in summons for defendant to appear and answer.
2	Dismissal of suit where summons not served in consequence of plaintiff's failure to pay costs.
3	Where neither party appears suit to be dismissed.
4	Plaintiff may bring fresh suit or Court may restore suit to file.
5	Dismissal of suit where plaintiff after summons returned unserved, fails for seven days to apply for fresh summons.
6	Procedure when only plaintiff appears. When summons duly served. When summons not duly served. When summons served but not in due time.
7	Procedure where defendant appears on day of adjourned hearing and assigns good cause for previous non-appearance.
8	Procedure where defendant only appears.
9	Decree against plaintiff by default bars fresh suit.
10	Procedure in case of non-attendance of one or more of several plaintiffs.
11	Procedure in case of non-attendance of one or more of several defendants.
12	Consequence of non-attendance, without sufficient cause shown, of party ordered to appear in person.
13	Setting aside decree ex parte against defendant.
14	No decree to be set aside without notice to opposite party.

=== Order 10- Examination of Parties by the Court ===
Rule	Description
1	Ascertainment whether allegations in pleadings are admitted or denied.
1A	Direction of the court to opt for any one mode of alternative dispute resolution.
1B	Appearance before the conciliatory forum or authority.
1C	Appearance before the court consequent to the failure of efforts of conciliation.
2	Oral examination of party, or companion of party.
3	Substance of examination to be written.
4	Consequence of refusal or inability of pleader to answer.

=== Order 11- Discovery and Inspection ===
Rule	Description
1	Discovery by interrogatories.
2	Particular interrogatories to be submitted.
3	Costs of interrogatories.
4	Form of interrogatories.
5	Corporations.
6	Objections to interrogatories by answer.
7	Setting aside and striking out interrogatories.
8	Affidavit in answer, filing.
9	Form of affidavit in answer.
10	No exception to be taken.
11	Order to answer or answer further.
12	Application for discovery of documents.
13	Affidavit of documents.
14	Production of documents.
15	Inspection of documents referred to in pleading or affidavits.
16	Notice to produce.
17	Time for inspection when notice given.
18	Order for inspection.
19	Verified copies.
20	Premature discovery.
21	Non-compliance with order for discovery.
22	Using answers to interrogatories at trial.
23	Order to apply to minors.

=== Order 12- Admissions ===
Rule	Description
1	Notice of admission of case.
2	Notice to admit documents.
2A	Document to be deemed to be admitted if not denied after service of notice to admit documents.
3	Form of notice.
3A	Power of Court to record admission.
4	Notice to admit acts.
5	Form of admissions.
6	Judgment on admissions.
7	Affidavit of signature.
8	Notice to produce documents.
9	Costs.

=== Order 13- Production, Impounding and Return of Documents ===
Rule	Description
1	Original documents to be produced at or before the settlement of issues.
2	[Omitted.].
3	Rejection of irrelevant or inadmissible documents.
4	Endorsements on documents admitted in evidence.
5	Endorsements on copies of admitted entries in books, accounts and records.
6	Endorsements on documents rejected an inadmissible in evidence.
7	Recording of admitted and return of rejected documents.
8	Court may order any document to be impounded.
9	Return of admitted documents.
10	Court may sent for papers from its own records or from other Courts.
11	Provisions as to documents applied to material objects.

=== Order 14- Settlement of issues and determination of suit on issues of law or on Issues agreed upon. ===
Rule	Description
1	Framing of issues.
2	Court to pronounce judgment on all issues.
3	Materials from which issues may be framed.
4	Court may examine witnesses or documents before framing issues.
5	Power to amend and strike out, issues.
6	Questions of fact or law may by agreement be stated in form of issues.
7	Court, if satisfied that agreement was executed in good faith, may pronounce judgment.

=== Order 15- Disposal of the Suit at the First Hearing ===
Rule	Description
1	Parties not at issue.
2	One of several defendants not at issue.
3	Parties at issue.
4	Failure to produce evidence.

=== Order 16- Summoning and Attendance of Witnesses ===
Rule	Description
1	List of witnesses and summons to witnesses.
1A	Production of witnesses without summons.
2	Expenses of witness to be paid into Court on applying for summons; Experts; Scale of expenses; and Expenses to be directly paid to witnesses.
3	Tender of expenses to witness.
4	Procedure where insufficient sum paid in. Expenses of witnesses detained more than one day.
5	Time, place and purpose of attendance to be specified in summons.
6	Summons to produce document.
7	Power to require persons present in Court to give evidence or produce document.
7A	Summons given to the party for service.
8	Summons how served.
9	Time for serving summons.
10	Procedure where witness fails to comply with summons.
11	If witness appears, attachment may be withdrawn.
12	Procedure if witness fails to appear.
13	Mode of attachment.
14	Court may of its own accord summon as witnesses strangers to suit.
15	Duty of persons summoned to give evidence or produce document.
16	When they may depart.
17	Application of rules 10 to 13.
18	Procedure where witness apprehended cannot give evidence or produce document.
19	No witness to be ordered to attend in person unless resident within certain limits.
20	Consequence of refusal of party to give evidence when called on by Court.
21	Rules as to witnesses to apply to parties summoned.

=== Order 15-A- Attendance of Witnesses Confined or Demand in Prisons ===
Rule	Description
1	Definitions.
2	Power to require attendance of prisoners to give evidence.
3	Expenses to be paid into Court.
4	Power of State Government to exclude certain persons from the operation of rule 2.
5	Officer in charge of prison to abstain from carrying out order in certain cases.
6	Prisoner to be brought to Court in custody.
7	Power to issue commission for examination of witness in prison.

=== Order 16- Adjournment ===
Rule	Description
1	Court may grant time and adjourn hearing.
2	Procedure if parties fail to appear on day fixed.
3	Court may proceed notwithstanding either party fails to produce evidence, etc.

=== Order 17- Hearing of the Suit and Examination of Witnesses ===
Rule	Description
1	Right to begin.
2	Statement and production of evidence.
3	Evidence where several issues.
3A	Party to appear before other witnesses.
4	Recording of evidence.
5	How evidence shall be taken in appealable cases.
6	When deposition to be interpreted.
7	Evidence under section 138.
8	Memorandum when evidence not taken down by Judge.
9	When evidence may be taken in English.
10	Any particular question and answer may be taken down.
11	Questions objected to and allowed by Court.
12	Remarks on demeanour of witnesses.
13	Memorandum of evidence in unappealable cases.
14	[Omitted.].
15	Power to deal with evidence taken before another Judge.
16	Power to examine witness immediately.
17	Court may recall and examine witness.
17A	[Omitted.].
18	Power of Court to inspect.
19	Power to get statements recorded on commission.

=== Order 18- Hearing of the Suit and Examination of Witnesses ===
Rule	Description
1	Right to begin.
2	Statement and production of evidence.
3	Evidence where several issues.
3A	Party to appear before other witnesses.
4	Recording of evidence.
5	How evidence shall be taken in appealable cases.
6	When deposition to be interpreted.
7	Evidence under section 138.
8	Memorandum when evidence not taken down by Judge.
9	When evidence may be taken in English.
10	Any particular question and answer may be taken down.
11	Questions objected to and allowed by Court.
12	Remarks on demeanour of witnesses.
13	Memorandum of evidence in unappealable cases.
14	[Omitted.].
15	Power to deal with evidence taken before another Judge.
16	Power to examine witness immediately.
17	Court may recall and examine witness.
17A	[Omitted.].
18	Power of Court to inspect.
19	Power to get statements recorded on commission.

=== Order 19- Affidavits ===
Rule	Description
1	Power to order any point to be proved by affidavit.
2	Power to order attendance of deponent for cross-examination.
3	Matters to which affidavits shall be confined.

=== Order 20- Judgement and Decree ===
Rule	Description
1	Judgment when pronounced.
2	Power to pronounce judgment written by Judge's predecessor.
3	Judgment to be signed.
4	Judgments of Small Cause Courts. Judgments of other Courts.
5	Court to state its decision on each issue.
5A	Court to inform parties as to where an appeal lies in cases where parties are not represented by pleaders.
6	Contents of decree.
6A	Preparation of Decree.
6B	Copies of judgments when to be made available.
7	Date of decree.
8	Procedure where Judge has vacated office before signing decree.
9	Decree for recovery of immovable property.
10	Decree for delivery of movable property.
11	Decree may direct payment by instalments. Order, after decree, for payment by instalments.
12	Decree for possession and mesne profits.
12A	Decree for specific performance of contract for the sale or lease of immovable property.
13	Decree in administration-suit.
14	Decree in pre-emption-suit.
15	Decree in suit for dissolution of partnership.
16	Decree in suit for account between principal and agent.
17	Special directions as to accounts.
18	Decree in suit for partition of property or separate possession of a share therein.
19	Decree when set-off or counter-claim is allowed. Appeal from decree relating to set-off or counter-claim.
20	Certified copies of judgment and decree to be furnished.

=== Order 20A- Costs ===
Rule	Description
1	Provisions relating to certain items.
2	Costs to be awarded in accordance with the rules made by High Court.

=== Order 21- Execution of Decrees and Orders ===
==== Payment under Decree ====
Rule	Description
1	Modes of paying money under decree.
2	Payment out of Court to decree-holder
3	Lands situate in more than one jurisdiction.
4	Transfer to Court of Small Causes.
5	Mode of transfer.
6	Procedure where Court desires that its own decree shall be executed by another Court.
7	Court receiving copies of decree, etc., to file same without proof.
8	Execution of decree or order by Court to which it is sent.
9	Execution by High court of decree transferred by other Court.

==== Application for Execution ====
Rule	Description
10	Application for execution.
11	Oral application. Written application.
12	Application for arrest to state grounds.
12A	Application for attachment of movable property not in judgment-debtor's possession.
13	Application for attachment of immovable property to contain certain particulars.
14	Power to require certified extract from Collector's register in certain cases.
15	Application for execution by joint decree-holders.
16	Application for execution by transferee of decree.
17	Procedure on receiving application for execution of decree.
18	Execution in case of cross-decrees. 19. 20. 21. 22. 22A. 23.
19	Execution in case of cross-claims under same decree.
20	Cross-decrees and cross-claims in mortgage suits.
21	Simultaneous execution.
22	Notice to show cause against execution in certain cases.
22A	Sale not to be set aside on the death of the judgment-debtor before the sale but after the service of the proclamation of sale.
23	Procedure after issue of notice.

==== Process for execution ====
Rule	Description
24	Process for execution.
25	Endorsement on process.

==== Stay of execution ====
Rule	Description
26	When Court may stay execution. Power to require security from, or impose conditions upon, judgment-debtor.
27	Liability of judgment-debtor discharged.
28	Order of Court which passed decree or of Appellate Court to be binding upon Court applied to.
29	Stay of execution pending suit between decree-holder and judgment-debtors.

==== Mode of execution ====
Rule	Description
30	Decree for payment of money.
31	Decree for specific movable property.
32	Decree for specific performance for restitution of conjugal rights, or for an injunction.
33	Discretion of Court in executing decrees for restitution of conjugal rights.
34	Decree for execution of document, or endorsement of negotiable instrument.
35	Decree for immovable property.
36	Decree for delivery of immovable property when in occupancy of tenant.
37	Discretionary power to permit judgment-debtor to show cause against detention in prison.
38	Warrant for arrest to direct judgment-debtor to be brought up.
39	Subsistence-allowance.
40	Proceedings on appearance of judgment-debtor in obedience to notice or after arrest.

==== Attachment of property ====
Rule	Description
41	Examination of judgment-debtor as to his property.
42	Attachment in case of decree for rent or mesne profits or other matter, amount of which to be subsequently determined.
43	Attachment of movable property, other than agricultural produce, in possession of judgment-debtor.
43A	Custody of movable property.
44	Attachment of agricultural produce.
45	Provisions as to agricultural produce under attachment.
46	Attachment of debt, share and other property not in possession of judgment-debtor.
46A	Notice to garnishee.
46B	Order against garnishee.
46C	Trial of disputed questions.
46D	Procedure where debt belongs to third person.
46E	Order as regards third person.
46F	Payment by garnishee to be valid discharge.
46G	Costs.
46H	Appeals.
46I	Application to negotiable instruments.
47	Attachment of share in movables.
48	Attachment of salary or allowances of servant of the Government or railway company or local authority.
48A	Attachment of salary or allowances of private employees.
49	Attachment of partnership property.
50	Execution of decree against firm.
51	Attachment of negotiable instruments.
52	Attachment of property in custody of Court or public officer.
53	Attachment of decrees.
54	Attachment of immovable property.
55	Removal of attachment after satisfaction of decree.
56	Order for payment of coin or currency notes to party entitled under decree.
57	Determination of attachment.

==== Adjudication of claims and objections ====
Rule	Description
58	Adjudication of claims to, or objections to attachment, of property.
59	Stay of sale.
60	[Omitted.].
61	[Omitted.].
62	[Omitted.].
63	[Omitted.].

==== Sale generally ====
Rule	Description
64	Power to order property attached to be sold and proceeds to be paid to person entitled.
65	Sales by whom conducted and how made. 66.
66	Proclamation of sales by public auction.
67	Mode of making proclamation.
68	Time of sale.
69	Adjournment or stoppage of sale.
70	[Omitted.].
71	Defaulting purchaser answerable for loss on re-sale.
72	Decree-holder not to bid for or buy property without permission. Where decree-holder purchases, amount of decree may be taken as payment.
72A	Mortgagee not to bid at sale without the leave of the Court.
73	Restriction on bidding or purchase by officers.

==== Sale of movable property ====
Rule	Description
74	Sale of agricultural produce.
75	Special provisions relating to growing crops.
76	Negotiable instruments and shares in corporations.
77	Sale by public auction.
78	Irregularity not to vitiate sale, but any person injured may sue.
79	Delivery of movable property, debts and shares.
80	Transfer of negotiable instruments and shares.
81	Vesting order in case of other property.

==== Sale of immovable property ====
Rule	Description
82	What Courts may order sales.
83	Postponement of sale to enable judgment-debtor to raise amount of decree.
84	Deposit by purchaser and re-sale on default.
85	Time for payment in full of purchase-money.
86	Procedure in default of payment.
87	Notification on re-sale.
88	Bid of co-sharer to have preference.
89	Application to set aside sale on deposit.
90	Application to set aside sale on ground of irregularity or fraud.
91	Application by purchaser to set aside sale on ground of judgment-debtor having no saleable interest.
92	Sale when to become absolute or be set aside.
93	Return of purchaser-money in certain cases.
94	Certificate to purchaser.
95	Delivery of property in occupancy of judgment-debtor.
96	Delivery of property in occupancy of tenant.

==== Resistance to delivery of possession to decree-holder or purchaser ====
Rule	Description
97	Resistance or obstruction to possession of immovable property.
98	Orders after adjudication.
99	Dispossession by decree-holder or purchaser.
100	Order to be passed upon application complaining of dispossession.
101	Question to be determined.
102	Rules not applicable to transferee pendente lite.
103	Orders to be treated as decrees.
104	Orders under rule 101 or rule 103 to be subject to the result of pending suit.
105	Hearing of application.
106	Setting aside orders passed ex parte, etc.

== See also ==
- Courts
- Judiciary of India
- Indian Penal Code
- Indian Evidence Act
- Government of India
- Law enforcement in India
- Code of Criminal Procedure, 1973
- Administrative divisions of India
