= List of United States defense contractors =

The Top 100 Contractors Report on the Federal Procurement Data System lists the top 100 defense contractors by sales to the United States Armed Forces and Department of Defense. ('DoD 9700' worksheet). The Department of Defense announces contracts valued at $7 million or more each business day at 5 pm. All defense contractors maintain CAGE (Commercial and Government Entity) Codes and are profiled in the System for Award Management (SAM).

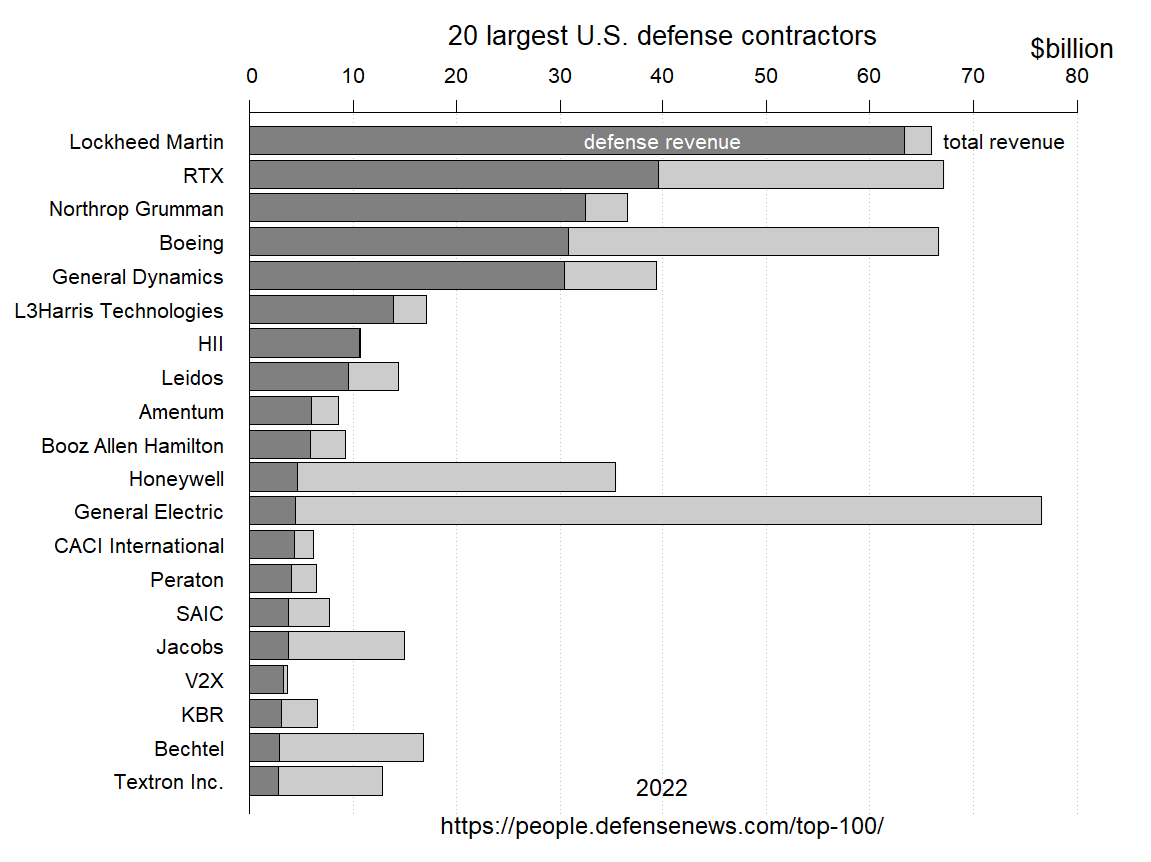
The 20 largest US defense contractors as of 2022 ranked by their defense revenue.

== List of top 100 United States defense contractors ==
Top 100 U.S. defense contractors
(United States) Academi
(United States) Action Target
(United States) ADT Corporation
(United States) Advanced Armament Corporation
(United States) AECOM
(United States) Aerospace Corporation
(United States) Aerovironment
(United States) AirScan
(United States) AM General
(United States) American Petroleum Institute
(United States) Argon ST
(United States) ARINC
(United States) Artis
(United States) Astronautics Corporation of America
(United States) Atec
(United States) Aurora Flight Sciences
(United States) Axon Enterprise
(United Kingdom) BAE Systems
- (United States) BAE Systems Inc
(United States) Ball Corporation
- (United States) Ball Aerospace & Technologies
(United States) Barrett Firearms Manufacturing
(United States) Battelle Memorial Institute
(United States) Bechtel
(United States) Berico Technologies
(United States) Boeing Defense, Space & Security
- (United States) Insitu
(United States) Booz Allen Hamilton
(United States) Boston Dynamics
(United States) Bravo Strategic
(United States) CACI
(United States) Carlyle Group
(United States) Carnegie Mellon University
(United States) Ceradyne
(United States) Cloudera
(United States) Colt Defense
(United States) The Columbia Group
(United States) Computer Sciences Corporation
(United States) Concurrent Technologies Corporation
(United States) CSRA (IT services company)
(United States) Cubic Corporation
- (United States) Omega Training Group
(United States) Curtiss-Wright
(United States) DeciBel Research
(United States) Dillon Aero
(United States) Dine Development Corporation
(United States) Draper Laboratories
(United States) DRS Technologies
(United States) DynCorp
(United States) Edison Welding Institute
(Israel) Elbit Systems
- (United States) M7 Aerospace
(United States) Ensco
(United Kingdom) / (United States) Ernst & Young
(United States) Evergreen International Aviation
(United States) Exxon
(United States) Fluor Corporation
(United States) Force Protection Inc
(United States) Foster-Miller
(United States) Foster Wheeler
(United States) Franklin Armoury
(United States) General Atomics
(United States) General Dynamics
- (United States) Bath Iron Works
- (United States) General Dynamics Electric Boat
- (United States) Gulfstream
- (United States) Vangent
(United States) General Electric Military Jet Engines Division
(United States) Halliburton Corporation
(United States) Health Net
(United States) Hewlett-Packard
(United States) Honeywell
(United States) Humana Inc.
(United States) Huntington Ingalls Industries
(United States) Hybricon Corporation
(United States) IBM
(United States) Insight Technology
(United States) Intelsat
(United States) International Resources Group
(United States) iRobot
(United States) ITT Exelis
(United States) Jacobs Engineering Group
(United States) JANUS Research Group
(United States) Johns Hopkins University
(United States) Kaman Aircraft
(United States) KBR
(United States) Kearfott Corporation
(United States) Knight's Armament Company
(United States) Kratos Defense & Security Solutions
(United States) L3Harris Technologies
- (United States) Aerojet
- (United States) Brashear
(United States) / (France) Lafayette Praetorian Group
(United States) Lake Shore Systems
(United States) Leidos
- (United States) EOTech
(United States) Lewis Machine & Tool Company
(United States) Lockheed Martin
- (United States) Gyrocam Systems
- (United States) Sikorsky
(United States) LRAD Corporation
(United States) M7 Security Group
(United States) ManTech International
(United States) Maxar Technologies
(United States) McQ
(United States) Microsoft
(United States) Mission Essential Personnel
(United States) Motorola
(United States) Natel Electronic Manufacturing Services
(United States) Navistar Defense
(United States) Nextel
(United States) Northrop Grumman
- (United States) Northrop Grumman Electronic Systems
- (United States) Northrop Grumman Ship Systems
- (United States) Northrop Grumman Technical Services
- (United States) Northrop Grumman Innovation Systems
(United States) NOVA
(United States) Oceaneering International
(United States) Olin Corporation; also see John M. Olin and John M. Olin Foundation
(United States) Oshkosh Corporation
(United States) Para-Ordnance
(United States) Perot Systems
(United States) Picatinny Arsenal
(United States) Pinnacle Armor
(United States) Precision Castparts Corporation
(United States) Raytheon Technologies
- (United States) Collins Aerospace
  - (United States) Rockwell Collins
  - (United States) Goodrich Corporation
- (United States) Pratt & Whitney
- (United States) Raytheon Intelligence & Space
- (United States) Raytheon Missiles & Defense
- (United States) Raytheon BBN
(United States) Remington Arms
(United States) Rock Island Arsenal
(United States) Roundhill Group
(United States) Ruger
(United States) Saab Sensis
(United States) Science Applications International Corporation (SAIC)
(United States) SGIS
(United States) Sierra Nevada Corporation
(United States) Smith & Wesson
(United States) Smith Enterprise (SEI)
(United States) SPRATA
(United States) Springfield Armory
(United States) SRC Inc
(United States) SRI International
(United States) Stanley
(United States) Stealth Communications
(United States) Stewart & Stevenson
(United States) Swift Engineering
(United States) Tactical Air Support
(United States) Teledyne
- (United States) Teledyne FLIR
(United States) Textron
- (United States) AAI Corporation
- (United States) Bell Helicopter Textron
(United States) Trijicon
(United States) TriWest Healthcare Alliance
(United States) Unisys
(United States) U.S. Ordnance
(United States) Verizon Communications
(United States) Vinnell Corporation
(United States) Westinghouse Electric Corporation

== See also ==
- Government contractor
- List of private military companies
- Top 100 Contractors of the U.S. federal government
