= Chatsworth, Los Angeles =

Chatsworth
- Neighborhood of Los Angeles
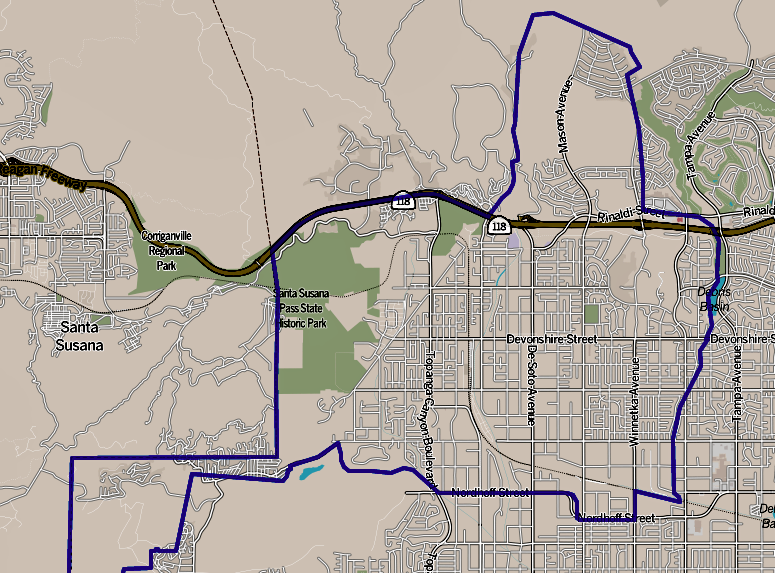
- Chatsworth neighborhood as mapped by the Los Angeles Times

- Location within Los Angeles/San Fernando Valley
- Coordinates: 34°15′26″N 118°36′04″W
- Country: United States
- State: California
- County: Los Angeles
- City: Los Angeles
- Named for: Chatsworth House, Derbyshire, England
- Elevation: 978 ft (298 m)

Population (2000)
  - Total: 41,255
- Time zone: UTC-8 (PST)
  - Summer (DST): UTC-7 (PDT)
- ZIP code: 91311
- Area codes: 747 and 818

Chatsworth is a suburban neighborhood in Los Angeles, California, in the San Fernando Valley. The area around the town was home to Native Americans, who left caves containing rock art. Chatsworth was discovered and settled by the Spanish beginning in the 18th century. The land was part of a Spanish land grant, Rancho Ex-Mission San Fernando. After the United States purchased the land following the Mexican–American War, it was the largest such grant in California. Chatsworth has seven public and eight private schools. There are large open-space and smaller recreational parks as well as a public library and a transportation center. Landmarks in the town include the former Chatsworth Reservoir and the Santa Susana Field Laboratory. The neighborhood has one of the lowest population densities in Los Angeles and a relatively high income level. Chatsworth is the home of the Iverson Movie Ranch, a 500-acre (202-hectare) area which was the most filmed movie ranch in history, as more than 2,000 productions used it as a filming location.

== Population ==
The 2000 U.S. census counted 35,073 residents in the 15.2 square miles (39 km^{2}) Chatsworth neighborhood, or 2,301 people per square mile, among the lowest population densities for both the city and the county. In 2008, the city estimated that the population had increased to 37,102. In 2000, the median age for residents was 40, considered old for city and county neighborhoods; the percentages of residents aged 35 and older were among the county's highest.

The neighborhood was considered to be ethnically "moderately diverse" for both the city of Los Angeles and its county, with a relatively high percentage of whites and Asian people, and a sizable Hispanic/Latino community. The population was 65.7% Non-Hispanic White, 14.4% Asian, 13.5% Hispanic or Latin, 2.2% Black, and 4.2% of other origins. Among the 25.2% of residents born abroad - a low figure for Los Angeles - Korea (10.4%) and the Philippines (9.3%) were the most common places of birth.

The median yearly household income in 2008 dollars was $84,456, considered to be a high income for the city. The percentages of families that earned more than $40,000 was considered high for the county. Renters occupied 28.9% of the housing stock, and house- or apartment-owners held 71.1%. The average household size of 2.6 people was considered average for Los Angeles.

In 2000, there were 2,933 military veterans, or 10.8% of the population, a high percentage compared to the rest of the city. The percentage of married people was among the county's highest. The rate of 10% of families headed by single parents was low for the city.

== Geography ==
Chatsworth is flanked by the Santa Susana Mountains on the north, Porter Ranch and Northridge on the east, Winnetka, Canoga Park, West Hills on the south, the Simi Hills, and unincorporated Los Angeles County and Ventura County on the west, and Twin Lakes, a community founded by San Francisco's George Haight in the early 20th century and unincorporated Los Angeles County which includes a 1,600-acre park with equestrian trails, to the north.

== Climate ==
This region experiences hot and dry summers, with average daily high temperatures of 90–100 °F. According to the Köppen Climate Classification system, Chatsworth has a Mediterranean climate.

Climate data for Chatsworth (Heynemann), Los Angeles, California, US
Month	Jan	Feb	Mar	Apr	May	Jun	Jul	Aug	Sep	Oct	Nov	Dec	Year
Record high °F (°C)	84 (28.9)	85 (29.4)	92 (33.3)	99 (37.2)	105 (40.6)	101 (38.3)	105 (40.6)	106 (41.1)	108 (42.2)	104 (40.0)	90 (32.2)	82 (27.8)	108 (42.2)
Mean daily maximum °F (°C)	66.8 (19.3)	70.4 (21.3)	71.7 (22.0)	78.1 (25.6)	79.6 (26.4)	86.9 (30.5)	96.6 (35.9)	93.2 (34.0)	95.0 (35.0)	80.9 (27.2)	70.8 (21.6)	65.4 (18.5)	79.6 (26.4)
Mean daily minimum °F (°C)	37.4 (3.0)	38.0 (3.3)	43.3 (6.3)	47.1 (8.4)	49.3 (9.6)	52.2 (11.2)	55.1 (12.8)	53.8 (12.1)	54.9 (12.7)	48.1 (9.0)	41.6 (5.3)	41.4 (5.2)	46.8 (8.2)
Record low °F (°C)	29 (−1.7)	28 (−2.2)	32 (0.0)	37 (2.8)	37 (2.8)	43 (6.1)	47 (8.3)	47 (8.3)	43 (6.1)	39 (3.9)	31 (−0.6)	28 (−2.2)	28 (−2.2)
Average precipitation inches (mm)	3.94 (100)	2.15 (55)	2.46 (63)	1.38 (35)	0.49 (13)	0.04 (1)	0.0 (0)	0.03 (1)	0.05 (1)	0.33 (8)	1.72 (44)	3.04 (77)	15.63 (398)
Source: NOAA NCEI (COOP Station USC00041679 / NCDCSTNID 20001814, "Chatsworth Heynemann"; period of record November 1945 – August 1959)

== History ==
=== Indigenous ===
Chatsworth was inhabited by the Tongva, Chumash, and Tataviam. They inhabited the valley for an estimated 8,000 years. Stoney Point is the site of the Tongva village of Momonga, which was also a trading place with the neighboring Tataviam and Chumash people. The nearby Burro Flats Painted Cave remains a legacy of the Chumash culture's rock art and solstice ceremony spirituality.

=== Spain and Mexico ===
The first European explorers came into the Chatsworth area on August 5, 1769, led by the Spanish military leader Gaspar de Portolà. With its establishment in 1797 and subsequent Spanish Land Grant by the King of Spain, Mission San Fernando (Mission San Fernando Rey de España) gained dominion over the San Fernando Valley's lands, including future Chatsworth.

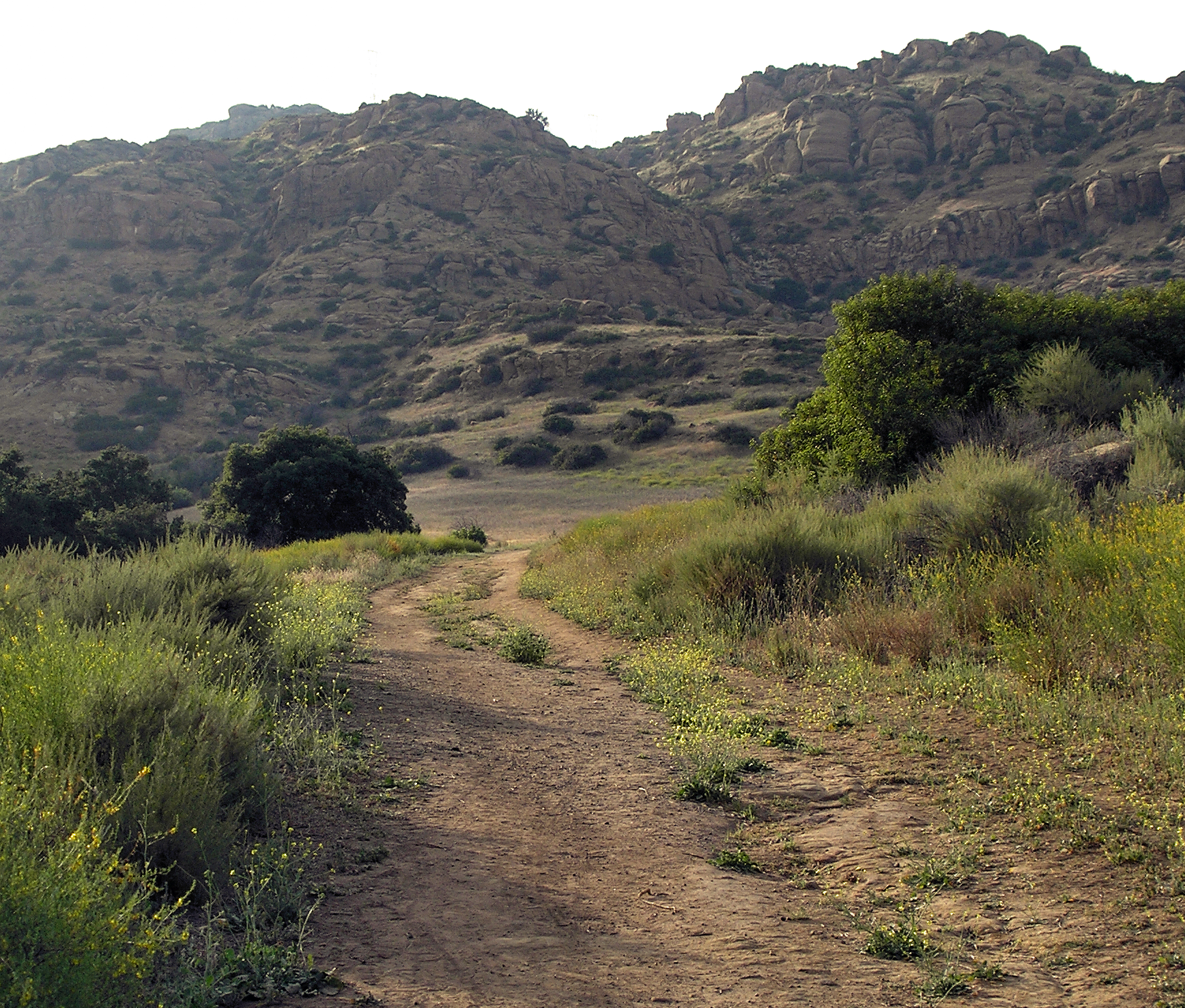
Old Santa Susana Stage Road trail up scenic Simi Hills in Chatsworth

The Native American trail that had existed from the Tongva-Tatavium village called rancheria Santa Susana (Chatsworth) to another village, replaced by Mission San Fernando, became the route for missionaries and other Spanish travel up and down California. It was part of the El Camino del Santa Susana y Simi trail that connected the Valley's Mission, Los Angeles pueblo (town), and the southern missions with the Mission San Buenaventura, the Presidio of Monterey, and the northward missions. The trail crossed over the Santa Susana Pass to the Simi Valley, through present day city park Chatsworth Park South and the Santa Susana Pass State Historic Park. In 1795, the Spanish land grant had been issued for Rancho Simi, reconfirmed in 1842 by the Mexican governor. Its lands included part of current Chatsworth, westward from Andora Avenue.

In 1821, after the Mexican War of Independence from Spain, the Mission San Fernando became part of Alta California, Mexico. In 1834, the Mexican government began redistributing the mission lands. In 1846, the Mexican land grant for Rancho Ex-Mission San Fernando was issued by Governor Pío Pico. It was bounded on the north by Rancho San Francisco and the Santa Susana Mountains, on the west by the Simi Hills, on the east by Rancho Tujunga, and on the south by the Montañas de Portesuelo (Santa Monica Mountains). The Rancho Ex-Mission San Fernando received a Federal land patent to retain ownership by the United States Public Land Commission in 1873 and was the single largest land grant in California.

=== Chatsworth ===
The Chatsworth Historical Society was formed in 1963 in an effort to successfully save the historic Pioneer Church from demolition. The society and Chatsworth Museum are located in Chatsworth Park South at Los Angeles Cultural Historical Monument No. 133, the Homestead Acre . In addition to preserving Chatsworth history and educating the public, the society acts as conservator of the Homestead Acre.

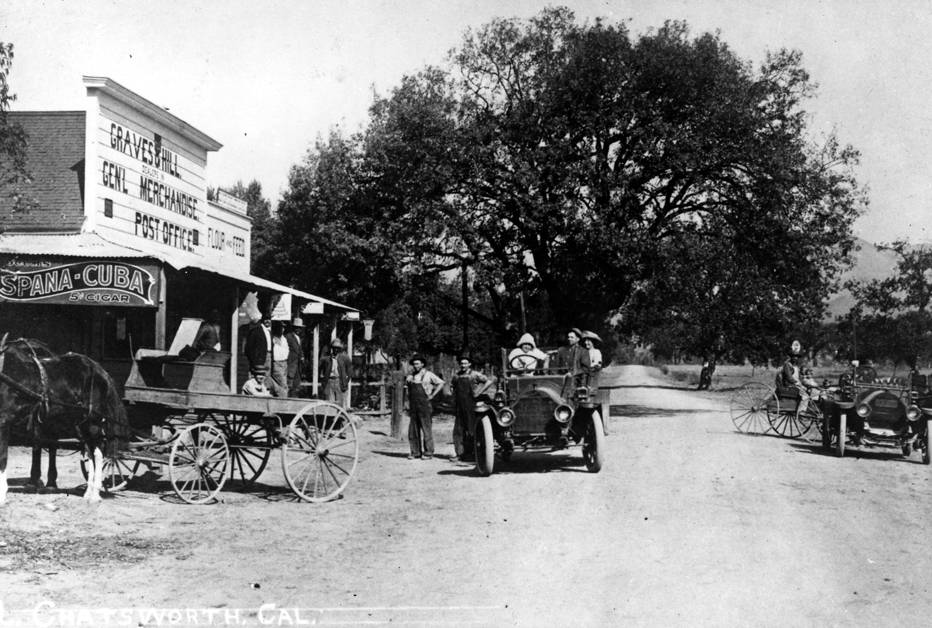
The center of Chatsworth, 1911, on what is now Topanga Canyon Boulevard

In 1869, the grantee's son, Eulogio F. de Celis, returned from Spain to Los Angeles. In 1874, the family sold their northern half of Rancho Ex-Mission San Fernando to northern Californians, California State Senator Charles Maclay and his partners George K. Porter, a San Francisco shoe manufacturer, and his cousin Benjamin F. Porter. The Porters' land was west of present-day Sepulveda Boulevard including most of Chatsworth, and the Maclay land was east of Sepulveda Boulevard.

The Old Santa Susana Stage Road or Santa Susana Wagon Road continued in use as an alternative to the route along El Camino Viejo from 1861 to 1875, replacing the older road as the main route between Los Angeles and San Francisco. The downgrade from the Santa Susana Pass into Chatsworth was known as "The Devil's Slide". A new wagon route bypassing the deteriorating Devil's Slide was opened in 1895. Initially called El Camino Nuevo (the New Road), it was later named the Chatsworth Grade Road, which continued in use until Santa Susana Pass Road (now Old Santa Susana Pass Road) was built in 1917. In 1876, the Southern Pacific Railroad opened a tunnel through the Newhall Pass, enabling rail connections from Los Angeles north to San Francisco, and rail travel soon replaced travel by stagecoach between Los Angeles and San Francisco. From this time, the stagecoach traffic to Santa Barbara once again used the coast route, and the Santa Susana Pass road was relegated to local traffic. Construction of the 118 Ronald Reagan Freeway through the Santa Susana Pass began in 1968 with major traffic now bypassing Santa Susana Pass Road.

The Chatsworth name, which hails from the stately Chatsworth House in Derbyshire, England, was first recorded in 1888, when George R. Crow filed with the Los Angeles County Recorder's Office a map of the San Fernando Valley with a subdivision he called "Chatsworth Park". William Booth Barber, the president of the San Fernando Valley Improvement Company, was born in England 17 miles from the Duke of Devonshire's palatial estate, Chatsworth House. In 1893 W.B. Barber filed an additional map with the Recorder's Office called the "Plat of Chatsworth Park Townsite".

== Government and infrastructure ==
The Chatsworth Branch Library, operated by the Los Angeles Public Library, is located at 21052 Devonshire Street. It was rebuilt in a modern style in 2002.

The Chatsworth Post Office, of the United States Postal Service, is located at 21606 Devonshire Street.

Los Angeles Animal Services operates the West Valley animal shelter in Chatsworth.

The U.S. Census Bureau operates the Los Angeles Regional Census Center in Chatsworth.

=== Transportation ===
The Chatsworth Transportation Center, a major transportation hub for the town and west valley, is served by 20 daily trains on the Metrolink Ventura County Line from Ventura to Union Station in Downtown Los Angeles. Amtrak California Pacific Surfliner has 10 trains daily traveling through here on the Coast Line which also handles freight transport by Union Pacific Railroad and was involved in the 2008 Chatsworth train collision near here.

The Orange Line of the Los Angeles Metro system was extended to Chatsworth Station in 2012, with a dedicated right-of-way across the Valley to North Hollywood Station of the Red Line subway.

The Chatsworth Transportation Center also offers connections to several Los Angeles Metro, Simi Valley, and Santa Clarita bus routes. It is located at 10046 Old Depot Plaza Road, between Devonshire and Lassen streets.

Chatsworth is serviced by the 118 freeway in the northern end of the neighborhood.

== Education ==
Thirty-four percent of Chatsworth residents aged 25 and older had earned a four-year degree by 2000, an average percentage for the city.

=== Schools ===
Schools within the Chatsworth boundaries are:

==== Public ====
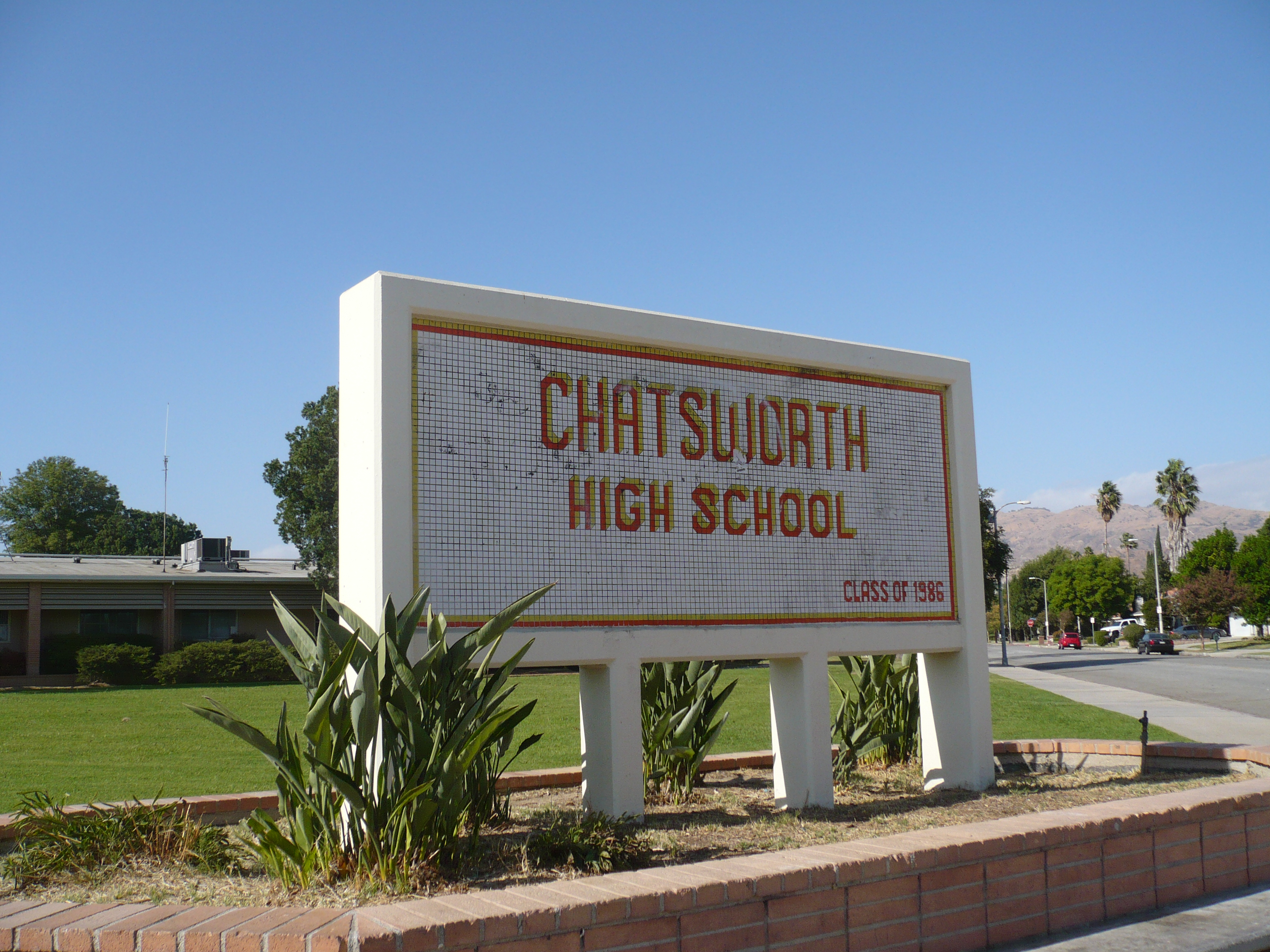
Chatsworth High School

- Chatsworth Senior High School, 10027 Lurline Avenue
- William Tell Aggeler Opportunity High School, 21050 Plummer Street
- Stoney Point Continuation School, 10010 De Soto Avenue
- Ernest Lawrence Middle School, 10100 Variel Avenue
- Germain Street Elementary School, 20730 Germain Street
- Chatsworth Park Elementary School, 22005 Devonshire Street
- Superior Street Elementary School, 9756 Oso Avenue
- Our Community School, 10045 Jumilla Ave

==== Private ====
- Sierra Canyon School, pre-kindergarten through 12, 20801 Rinaldi Street
- Chatsworth Hills Academy, elementary, 21523 Rinaldi Street
- St. Paul's Christian Academy, 21621 Heather Lee Lane
- Al-Falaq / Me'raj Academy, elementary, 11070 Old Santa Susana Pass Road
- Egremont Schools, Inc., elementary, 19850 Devonshire Street
- Chaminade College Preparatory School, middle, 19800 Devonshire Street
- St. John Eudes, elementary, 9925 Mason Avenue
- Monarch Christian School, 22280 Devonshire Street

== Parks and recreation ==
The City of Los Angeles Parks and Recreation Department, California Department of Parks and Recreation, County of Los Angeles, California State Park Volunteers, and the Santa Monica Mountains Conservancy operate the various natural open space preserve parks and neighborhood recreation parks.

=== Open-space parks ===
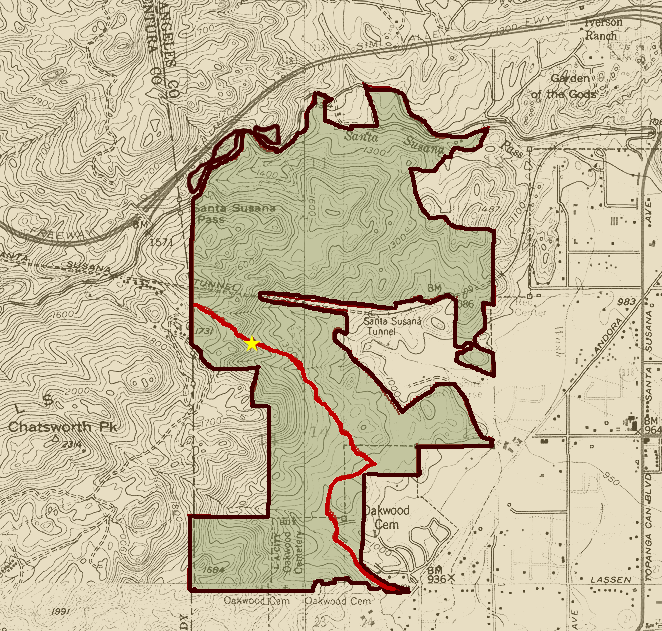
West Chatsworth and the Santa Susana Pass State Historic Park, with the Old Santa Susana Stage Road in red

- Chatsworth Park North: includes more than 20 acres (81,000 m^{2}) of the scenic Simi Hills and is operated by the Los Angeles Parks Department, has three baseball diamonds, football field, and outdoor basketball courts, all lighted; volleyball courts, a children's play area, hiking trails, a jogging path, and picnic tables with barbecue pits. The park now has fencing that blocks visitors from climbing the large boulder outcrops, but Stoney Point Park and Chatsworth Park South are nearby for bouldering and rockclimbing
- Chatsworth Park South: includes more than 100 acres (0.40 km^{2}) of the rocky landmark Simi Hills. Chatsworth Park South is adjacent to the Santa Susana Pass State Historic Park, a 174-acre (0.70 km^{2}) National Register of Historic Places property consisting of historic features and deposits, prehistoric village site remnants, and portions of the Old Santa Susana Stage Road, which was the main route for mail and travelers between Los Angeles and San Francisco from 1861 until the opening of rail connections between the two cities in 1876. The stage route was also declared Los Angeles Historic-Cultural Monument #92 (designated January 5, 1972) and Ventura County Historical Landmark #104 (designated October 21, 1986). The park has miles of horseback, jogging, and hiking trails, picnic tables and barbecue pits, and bouldering outcrops
  - Chatsworth Recreation Center facilities are located within the lower area of Chatsworth Park South, with lighted indoor basketball courts, lighted outdoor basketball courts, a children's play area, an indoor gymnasium, a stage, and lighted tennis courts
  - The Minnie Hill Palmer House, one of the West Valley's historic original homestead houses, is in Chatsworth Park South for visits and the Chatsworth Historical Society archives
  - The park had been closed from February 2008 to 2018 due to contamination discovered from when the park used to be a shooting range for Roy Rogers
- Michael D. Antonovich Park at the Joughin Ranch: includes over 1600 acres of hiking, equestrian trails, creeks, waterfalls and the site of one of the historic Bannon Quarries
- Santa Susana Pass State Historic Park (SSPSHP): a large natural area adjacent to and above the town's western side. The Santa Susana Pass State Historic Park protects and offers a historical site of the late 19th century, when Chatsworth was on a main thoroughfare for the figures of the American West. Joaquin Murrieta and his bandits hid out in the rocky crevices around Stoney Point. The Old Stagecoach Trail above Chatsworth to the west, is now a popular hiking trail in the Simi Hills. It goes through Santa Susana Pass State Historic Park and Chatsworth Park South and by Chatsworth Oaks Park. The State Park is open to the public with several parking and trailhead areas and many hiking and view opportunities
- Chatsworth Oaks Park: an approximately 3-acre (1.2 ha) natural open space park. It has barbecue pits, a children's play area, and picnic tables near the parking area. Visitors may ride bicycles and hike in the park, which has no established trails but links to nearby Santa Susana Pass State Historic Park. The park overlooks the Chatsworth Nature Preserve, with birdwatching opportunities

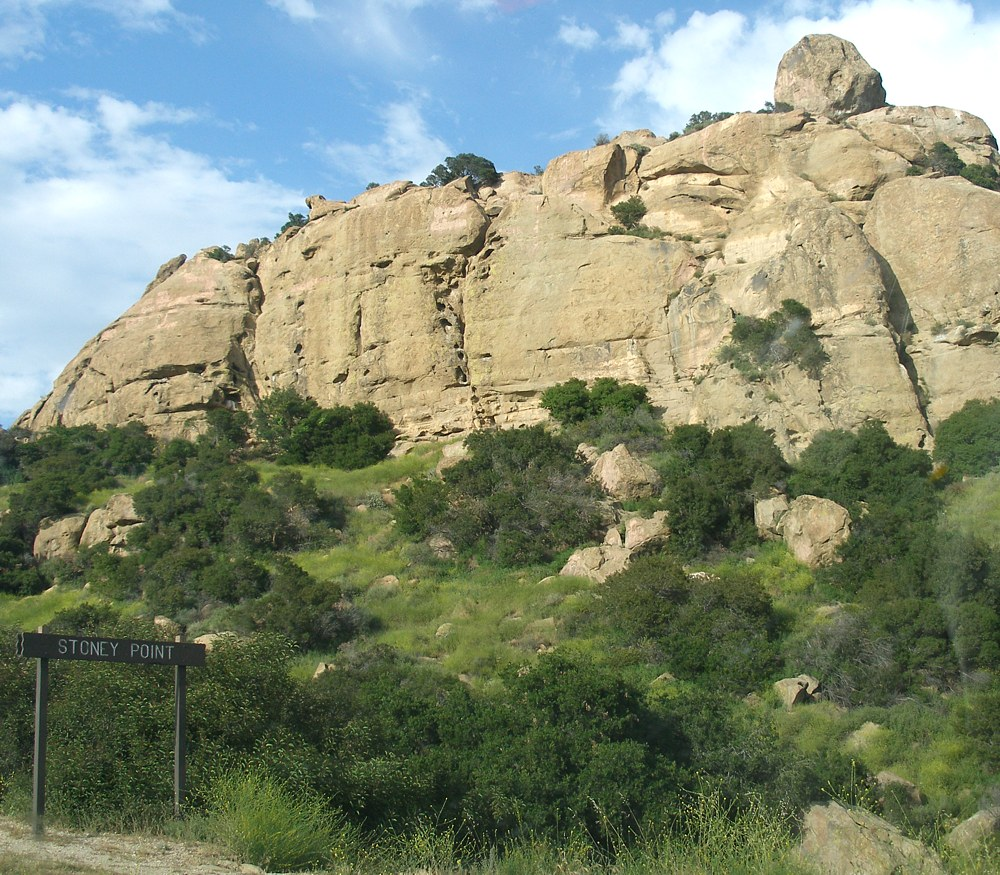
Stoney Point Park in Chatsworth

- Stoney Point Park: at Stoney Point is a natural rock outcropping, geographic promontory landmark and legendary bouldering and rock climbing location on 76-acre (31 ha). The boulders at Stoney Point Park merge and form alcoves, caves, and dens. The park also has bridle paths, hiking trails, and connections to adjacent parks to the north. Stoney Point is thought to be the site of the Tongva settlement named Asha'awanga or Momonga. Browns Creek Bike Path ends near Stoney Point
- Chatsworth Trails Park: in the Santa Susana Mountains foothills just north of the 118 Freeway with parking at 11200 Mayan Drive. Chatsworth Trails Park has miles of horseback, hiking, and mountain biking trails and is also a hub connecting to the huge Michael D. Antonovich Regional Park at Joughin Ranch, the Indian Springs Open Space Park, and Rocky Peak Park at Rocky Peak. The Rim of the Valley Trail passes through here, with trailhead access
- Sage Ranch Park: overlooks Chatsworth from its 2,000-foot (610 m) high ridges in the Simi Hills near the Santa Susana Field Laboratory. It is a new open space park at the end of Woolsey Canyon Road. Sage Ranch Park has campsites, walking and hiking trails, and panoramic views of the San Fernando and Simi Valleys. It is located in Simi Valley

=== Neighborhood parks ===
- Mason Park: offers barbecue pits, lighted and unlighted baseball diamond, children's play area, and picnic tables
  - Mason Recreation Center: has an indoor gymnasium that may also be used as a 400-capacity auditorium
  - Mason Child Care Center: is licensed to have from up to 30 children of ages three and up to 60 school age children in educational and recreational activities at the center

=== Chatsworth Reservoir ===
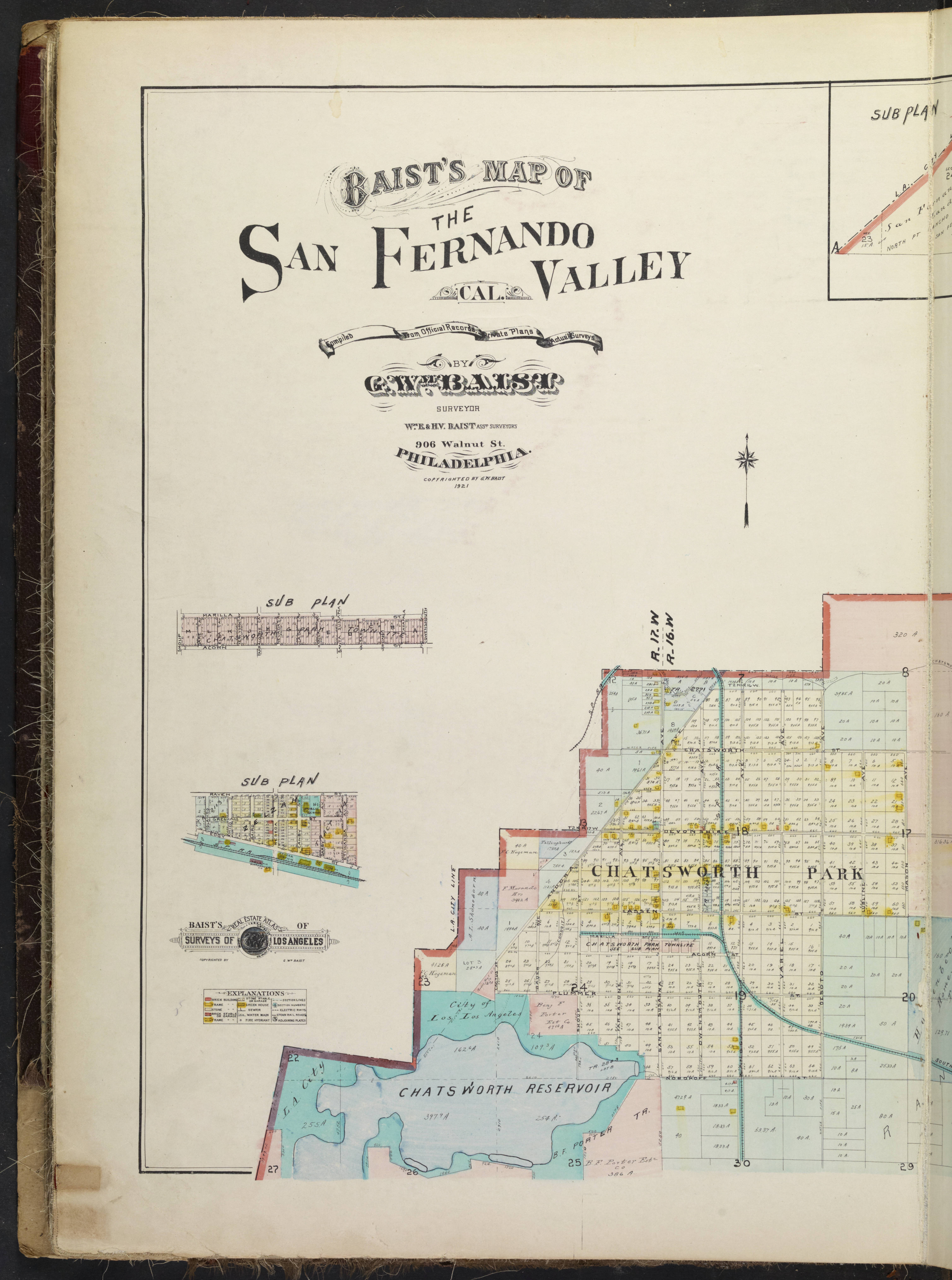
Chatsworth Reservoir, 1921

A distinctive feature in Chatsworth is the Chatsworth Dam and reservoir. Built in 1918 as part of the Los Angeles Aqueduct system, the property belongs to the Los Angeles Department of Water and Power. Due to increasing concerns of the water quality because of algae plumes and storm water inflow, it was taken out of service in August 1969. After the 1971 San Fernando earthquake additional concerns for seismic safety led to its abandonment by the LADWP as a storage facility. Chatsworth Oaks Park and the Chatsworth Nature Preserve are located here giving views of migrating birds and other animals, and their sounds such as the coyotes calling in the evening. The views of the rocky and dramatic Simi Hills surround the open space.

Chatsworth Reservoir is classified by the Los Angeles Times as a city neighborhood, but "because there are relatively few homes in this area," the Times does not provide separate statistics for it, but adds them to Chatsworth. The Devonshire and Topanga stations of the Los Angeles Police Department provide services in the area.

== Economy ==
Chatsworth is the home of the National Notary Association and the headquarters for Premier America (formerly Litton Federal Credit Union) and Matadors Community Credit Union.

The Santa Susana Field Laboratory (SSFL), once busy with Rocketdyne testing rocket engines and Atomics International doing nuclear research, is high in the Simi Hills west of Chatsworth. It has been closed and will undergo an extensive environmental cleanup, andsoon become an open-space park. The park will permanently add to Chatsworth's scenic backdrop, greenway, and hiking opportunities.

Some of the current large employers based in Chatsworth are Capstone Turbine, Natel Engineering, and Hydraulics International. Lamps Plus has production and distribution facilities in Chatsworth.

Titus Software's United States subsidiary once had its headquarters in Chatsworth.

Seltzer Motor Industries, of Chatsworth, in 1979 produced the Willow, a two-seat sports car kit. It is the first transverse, inline four-cylinder, mid-engined kit car ever offered to the public.

== Notable people ==
- Amari Bailey (born 2004), professional basketball player in Israel, formerly in the NBA
- Taurus Tremani Bartlett, or Polo G (born 1999), rapper
- Donald Friese (born 1940), billionaire businessman
- Doug Garwood, professional golfer
- Mike Moustakas, former Major League Baseball player
- Larry Niven, science fiction and fantasy author
- Ayn Rand, novelist, philosopher, screenwriter, lived in the Von Sternberg House from July 1944 to October 1951.
- Smokey Robinson, singer, songwriter, record producer
- Jenny Y. Yang, chemist

== See also ==
- Lassen Street Olive Trees (Chatsworth, California)
- Old Santa Susana Stage Road
- Burro Flats Painted Cave
- Rancho Ex-Mission San Fernando
- History of the San Fernando Valley to 1915
- List of Los Angeles Historic-Cultural Monuments in the San Fernando Valley
- Von Sternberg house by Neutra
