= Lamps Plus, Inc. v. Varela =

Lamps Plus Inc. et al., v. Frank Varela
- Supreme Court of the United States

Argued October 29, 2018 Decided April 24, 2019
- Full case name: Lamps Plus Inc. et al., Petitioners v. Frank Varela
- Docket no.: 17-988
- Citations: 587 U.S. (more) 139 S. Ct. 1407; 203 L. Ed. 2d 636

Case history
- Prior: 559 U.S. 662

Holding
- Class arbitration procedures could not be compelled based on ambiguous language in the arbitration agreement.

Court membership
- Chief Justice John Roberts Associate Justices Clarence Thomas · Ruth Bader Ginsburg; Stephen Breyer · Samuel Alito; Sonia Sotomayor · Elena Kagan; Neil Gorsuch · Brett Kavanaugh

Case opinions
- Majority: Roberts, joined by Thomas, Alito, Gorsuch, Kavanaugh
- Concurrence: Thomas
- Dissent: Ginsburg, joined by Breyer, Sotomayor
- Dissent: Breyer
- Dissent: Sotomayor
- Dissent: Kagan, joined by Ginsburg, Breyer; Sotomayor (Part II)

Laws applied
- Federal Arbitration Act

Lamps Plus, Inc. v. Varela, 587 U.S. ___ (2019), was a United States Supreme Court case regarding the use of class arbitration proceedings. In a 5–4 decision, the Supreme Court reversed the Ninth Circuit's decision and held that arbitration on a classwide basis could not be compelled based on the provision's ambiguous language. The Court relied on its previous decision in Stolt-Nielsen S.A. v. AnimalFeeds Int'l Corp. which held that class arbitration procedures could not be compelled without indication that the parties to the arbitration had agreed to these procedures.

== Background ==
Although class procedures are not explicitly referenced in the Act, Section 4 of the Federal Arbitration Act (“FAA”) grants courts the power to compel arbitration “in accordance with the terms of the agreement.” Class arbitrations, like class actions, purport to resolve disputes on behalf of a group of claimants. In Stolt-Nielsen S.A. v. AnimalFeeds Int'l Corp., the Supreme Court noted that class arbitrations are inherently different than traditional bilateral arbitration because some of the key features of bilateral arbitration, such as efficiency and confidentiality, are no longer guaranteed. Given these differences, and that arbitration is based on consent by the parties, the Court held that silence on the issue of class arbitration could not be interpreted to permit the use of class arbitration procedures. At least one scholar, however, takes the view that concerns over class arbitration are perhaps overstated. Not only does the Federal Arbitration Act not demand a specific timeline for resolution of arbitration claims but the current practice of publishing arbitration awards suggests that the concern over confidentiality is not exclusive to class arbitration.

== Facts ==
In 2016 Frank Varela, a Lamps Plus Inc. employee, filed a class action lawsuit against the company after a data breach exposed sensitive tax information of approximately 1,300 employees, including Mr. Varela's, and led to the filing of a fraudulent federal income tax return on his behalf. Lamps Plus moved to compel arbitration based on the employment contract which included an agreement to arbitrate disputes. Although the court granted the request to compel arbitration, it allowed the arbitrator to conduct the arbitration on a classwide basis rather than on an individual basis. Lamps Plus appealed the decision to the Ninth Circuit, which held that given the ambiguous language of the arbitration provision regarding availability of class arbitration procedures and that California law allowed courts to construe ambiguity against the drafter, the court could compel class arbitration based on Plaintiff's interpretation of the provision. According to the Ninth Circuit majority, Stolt-Nielsen was not controlling in this case because ‘silence’ on the issue of class arbitration meant that the parties in that case had not agreed to class arbitration procedures rather than just failed to include explicit reference in the provision.

== Supreme Court ==
=== Majority Opinion ===
The issue in front of the Supreme Court was whether arbitration on a classwide basis could be compelled based on ambiguous language in the arbitration provision. Although Plaintiff tried to distinguish its case from Stolt-Nielsen, Chief Justice Roberts concluded that like silence, ambiguity could not support the use of class arbitration procedures. Here, the Court relied heavily on the concerns regarding the fundamental differences between class and bilateral arbitration described in Stolt-Nielsen. As Chief Justice Roberts noted, class arbitrations not only sacrificed the informality of traditional bilateral arbitration, which led to lower costs and speedier resolution of disputes, but also distinctively affected the rights of absent class members. Thus, the majority concluded, agreement to such procedures could not be inferred from an ambiguous provision.

The Court also rejected the application of the contra proferentem doctrine, which states that ambiguity in a contract provision is to be construed against the drafter, to support the use of class arbitration provisions. It found that application of contra proferentem would be inconsistent with the FAA because it does not attempt to resolve what the intent of the parties actually was. This reasoning highlighted the Court's commitment to the policy favoring enforcement of arbitration agreements, codified in the FAA, in spite of the fact that as Justice Kagan argued in dissent, contra proferentem is a neutral state contract interpretation rule which is not displaced by the FAA.

=== Dissents ===
Although the dissenting Justices generally supported each other's dissenting opinions, each of the four dissenting Justices wrote their own dissent. Justice Ginsburg’s dissent emphasized what she viewed as the oppressive nature of arbitration clauses that denied employees and consumers the ability to band together. Justice Sotomayor joined this opinion and Part II of Justice Kagan's dissent to emphasize that given that the provision was ambiguous, the Court should have applied contra proferentem to resolve the ambiguity. Although he joined the dissents of Justice Ginsburg and Justice Kagan in full, Justice Breyer wrote separately regarding the Court's lack of jurisdiction to hear the case.

== Significance ==
The decision in Lamps Plus is the court's latest iteration on restricting the availability of class arbitration procedures. The Court has repeatedly highlighted the inherent differences between class and bilateral arbitrations in AT&T Mobility LLC v. Concepcion, Stolt-Nielsen, and in Epic Systems Corp. v. Lewis, as well as upheld class arbitration waivers in AT&T Mobility LLC v. Concepcion. Given the Court's emphasis on the consensual nature of arbitration in this case and in Stolt-Nielsen, there is now a presumption against the use of class arbitration absent explicit reference.

== See also ==
- Lists of United States Supreme Court cases
