= Premier America Credit Union Arena =

Stadium in California, United States

- Matadome
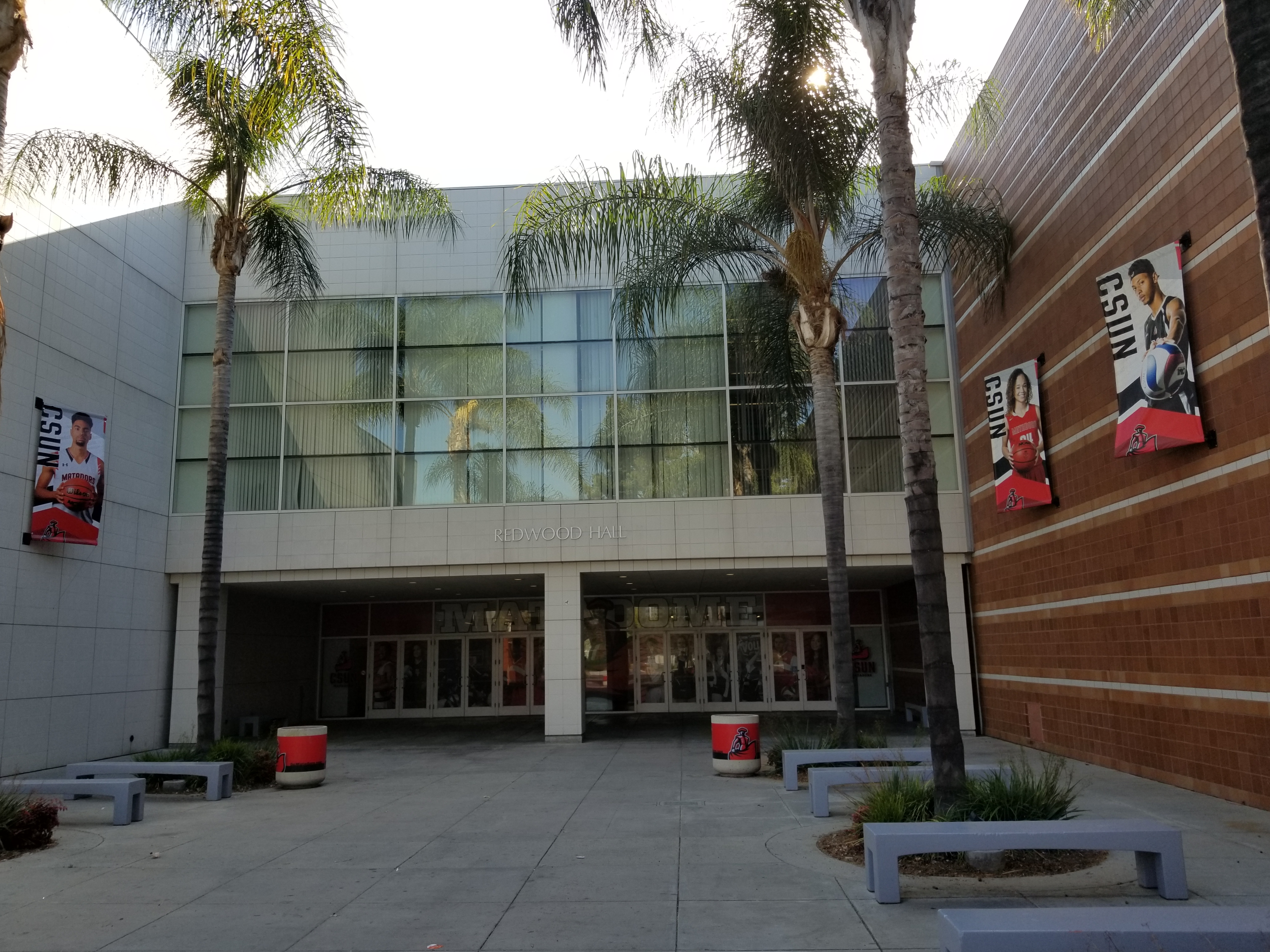
- Interactive map of Premier America Credit Union Arena
- Full name: Premier America Credit Union Arena
- Former names: Matador Gymnasium
- Location: 18111 Nordhoff Street; Northridge, CA 91330
- Coordinates: 34.241974°N 118.526484°W
- Owner: California State University, Northridge
- Capacity: 2,400
- Scoreboard: Yes
- Record attendance: 3,106 on 2 November 1990 for US Men's Volleyball

Construction
- Opened: 30 November 1962
- Renovated: 1998, 2014

Tenants
- Cal State Northridge Matadors men's basketball Cal State Northridge Matadors women's basketball Cal State Northridge Matadors men's volleyball Cal State Northridge Matadors women's volleyball

Premier America Credit Union Arena, formerly Matador Gymnasium, and formerly known by its nickname the Matadome, is a 2,500 seat, indoor multi-purpose stadium on the campus of California State University, Northridge in Northridge, California. The Matadome was renovated in 2014. With the renovation, the arena now has a capacity of 2,500.

== History and renovations ==
The Matadome, unlike many other traditional stadia, is located within Redwood Hall, which hosts many kinesiology classes for Cal State Northridge. Contrary to the name, Redwood Hall, and by default the Matadome, is not a dome at all – the roof is flat. The Matadome was completed in 1962 and was officially opened on 30 November of the same year. It got its name in the early 1980s, when Lisa Nehus Saxon, a reporter for the Los Angeles Daily News, playfully used the term in a game story.

The capacity of the Matadome has changed throughout the years. Before the 1994 Northridge earthquake, the Matadome had a capacity of over 3,000. The record attendance was 3,106 for a United States men's national volleyball team exhibition against Japan men's national volleyball team set on 2 November 1990, which was prior to the earthquake. After the earthquake, the upper section seats were removed to create more classroom space for Redwood Hall, and walls were put up to separate the Matadome from these new classrooms.

Other renovations include the installation of a completely new floor in 1996 (with a redesigning in 2001), a drop-down scoreboard above half court in 1997, and chair-backed bleacher seats in 1998.

In 2014, the Matadome was renovated and seating capacity was increased to 2,400-seats. The seats were previously lost due to the 1994 Northridge earthquake.

=== Pre-2014 renovation negative views ===
Despite all of these recent additions and renovations, the Matadome is still seen as a sub-standard arena. Players and coaches alike have spoken out about the gym, citing:

I don’t know how the Matadome got its name, but it sounds like a joke. And (then) someone thought it was serious and even made a little plaque to go with it outside.

— Willie Galick, 2007–2009, men's basketball, Daily Sundial

We’re a division-I program with a junior high or a YMCA gym.

— Neeta Sreekanth, 2008–2009, women's basketball, Daily Sundial

In an editorial for the Los Angeles Daily News, Jill Painter described the Matadome as "...the Kinesiology building with a basketball court inside...". Not surprisingly, the head coach for the men's basketball team believes the Matadome may hinder Northridge's athletic programs.

Don't be fooled by the name, 'The Matadome'. It's really the 'Mata-gym'.

— Bobby Braswell, 1996–2013, men's basketball head coach, The Press-Enterprise

It's an issue. It’s affected our high school-recruiting and other things.

— Bobby Braswell, 1996–2013, men's basketball head coach, Daily Sundial

On March 23, 2022, the school announced a new partnership with Premier America Credit Union, with the arena being renamed the Premier America Credit Union Arena.

== Tenants ==
Before the Matadome opened, the Cal State Northridge Matadors men's basketball team played their home games at nearby Granada Hills Charter High School. They've played at the Matadome since its opening in 1962 and has been joined by the women's basketball team, as well as the men's and women's volleyball teams.

In addition to Northridge athletics, the Matadome has also hosted the 2001 Big Sky Conference men's basketball tournament.

For non-athletic events, the Matadome has been used as a setting for The Karate Kid (1984) and National Lampoon's Van Wilder (2002).

== Gallery ==
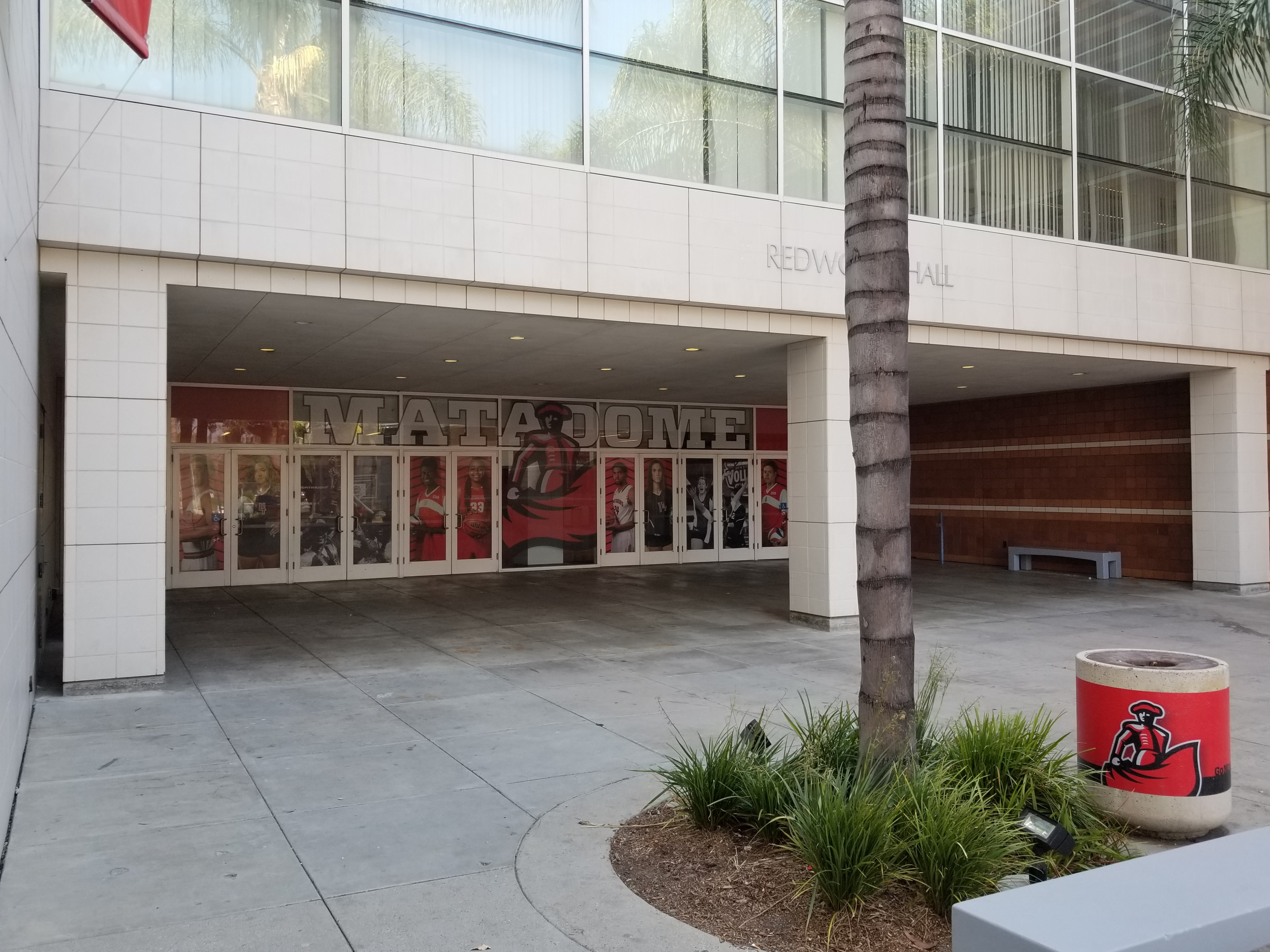
Matadome entrance

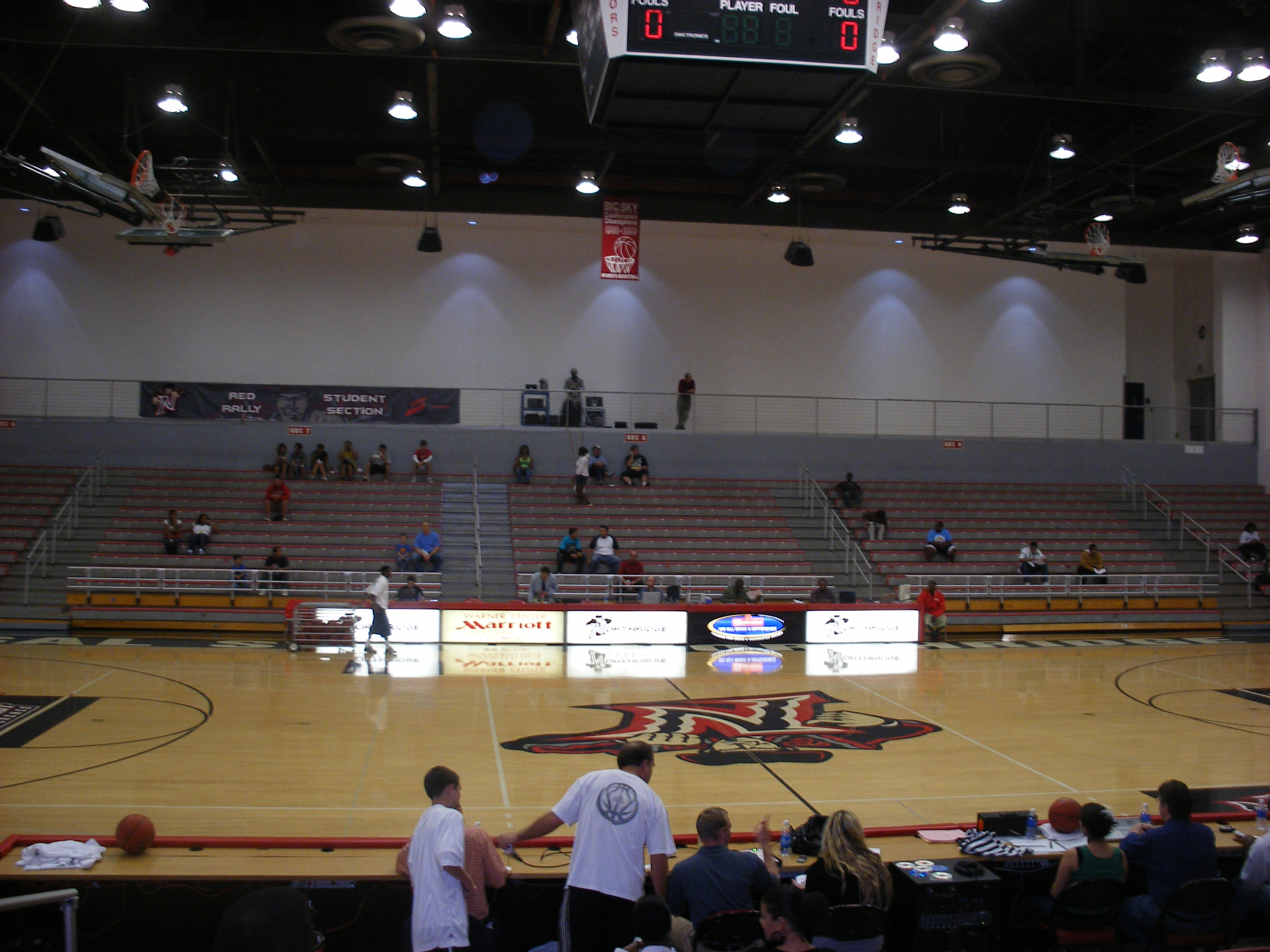
Matadome interior

== See also ==
- List of NCAA Division I basketball arenas
