= SMSS =

SMSS may refer to:

- Session Manager Subsystem (smss.exe), a component of the Microsoft Windows NT operating system
- Switching and Management Subsystem, in wireless communication technology
- Squad Mission Support System, military robotic system developed by Western company Lockheed Martin
- St. Margaret's Secondary School, a government-aided autonomous girls' secondary school in Bukit Timah, Singapore
- Sailor Moon SuperS, the fourth season of the anime series Sailor Moon
- SkyMapper Sky Survey
- SQL Server Management Studio, used for configuring, managing, and administering all components within Microsoft SQL Server
