= MCQ =

MCQ may refer to:

- MCQ, a commonly-used acronym for Multiple choice question
- McQ, a 1974 crime action film
- McQ Inc, an American defense company based in Pennsylvania
- Mathematical Citation Quotient, a measure of the impact of a mathematics journal
- Malvern College Qingdao
- IATA code for Miskolc Airport
- McQ, a clothing line from Alexander McQueen
- Christopher McQuarrie, American filmmaker nicknamed McQ
