= Lamps Plus =

Privately held corporation

- Type: Private
- Industry: Retail
- Founded: 1976
- Headquarters: Chatsworth, Los Angeles, California
- Number of locations: 34
- Products: Lighting and Home Furnishings
- Owner: Dennis Swanson
- Number of employees: 1,500
- Website: www.lampsplus.com

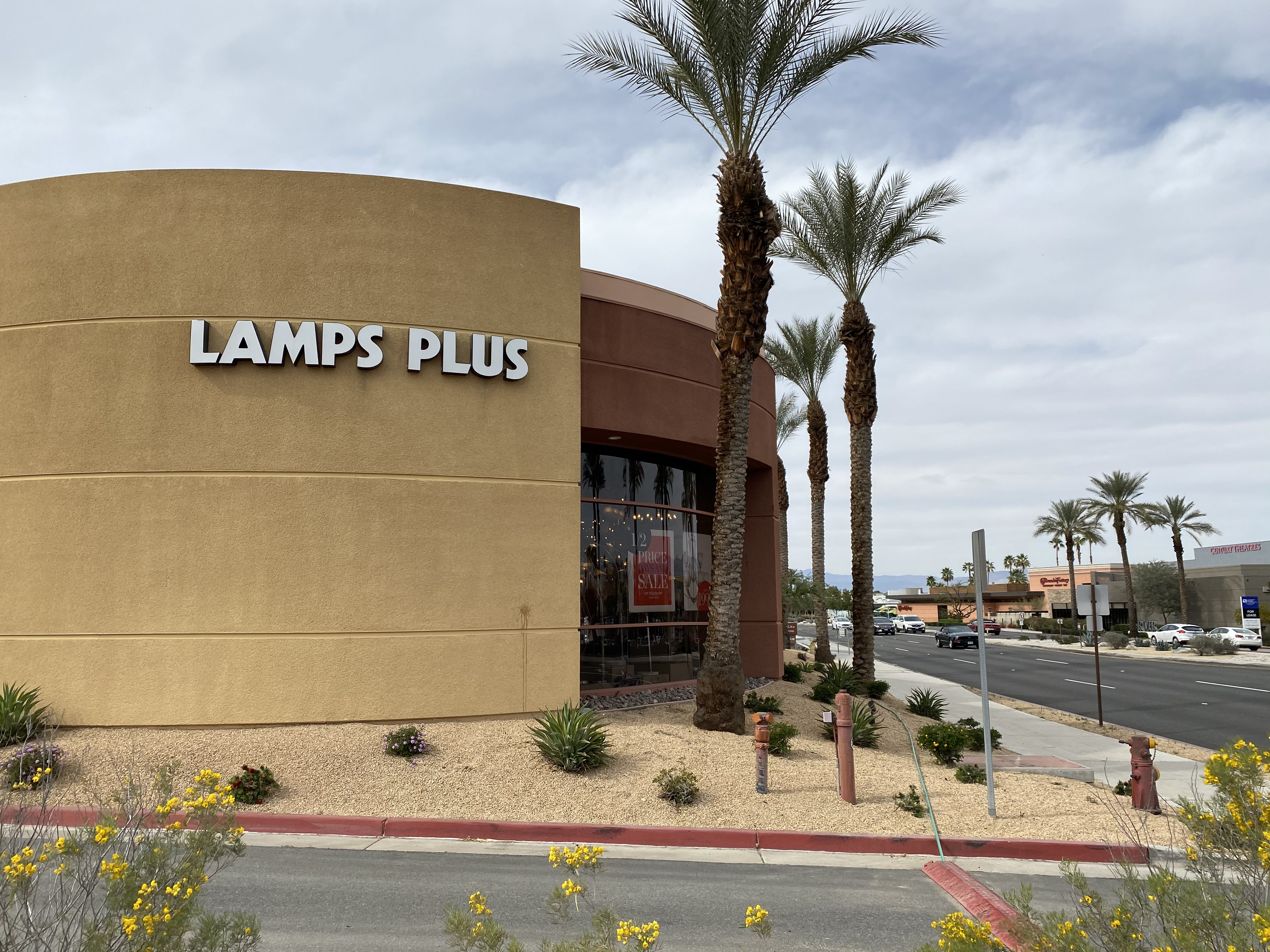
LAMPS PLUS store in Palm Springs, California

Lamps Plus, Inc. is a privately held corporation that designs, manufactures, and retails light fixtures, furniture, and home décor. Its headquarters is located in the Chatsworth neighborhood of Los Angeles, California.

== Background ==
The company was founded in 1976 in Los Angeles by CEO Dennis Swanson and co-owner Manja Swanson. The first store was located in North Hollywood, and was both a manufacturing and retail space. From lamp design and manufacturing, the company expanded into retail. Lamps Plus later opened its corporate headquarters in Chatsworth, California, where it also operates a trade division, a hospitality division, and a distribution center.

In 2004, its website was picked as one of the top 50 retail websites by Internet Retailer magazine. The company has made the top 200 of the list every year it has been published. The company was the first U.S. retailer to offer the option for customers to text store associates with inquiries without requiring an app. The company and Dennis Swanson hold several patents for lighting design, including a torchiere floor lamp design with two adjustable side lights and a lamp having a low light level replaceable bulb. Dennis Swanson has also served as past President of the American Lighting Association.

Originally the company was called Lamps R Us but had to change it on a request from Toys "Я" Us.

In 2016, the company had a data breach of employee data, which led to a class-action lawsuit. In Lamps Plus, Inc. v. Varela, the U.S. Supreme court ruled that the company could compel employees to settle through individual arbitration based on their employment contract.

== Products ==
- In 2012, the company began selling its Color Plus collection lamps. These custom manufactured products are offered in more than 100 color choices.
- July 2020: Lamps Plus also launched a new range of lighting fixtures that provide customers with a variety of unique style designs on metal pendant lights and chandeliers. The line Giclee Gallery uses concept wraps on metal fixtures.
- March 2021: Lamps Plus began exclusively selling Stiffel branded lighting fixtures. Stiffel is an American luxury lamp company that began in 1932.

== Partnerships ==
The company has worked with a number of industry designers and personalities, including industrial pattern designer Stacy Garcia, Kathy Ireland, furniture and lighting designer Sergio Orozco, lighting designer Robert Sonneman, Romero Britto and the Los Angeles pop artist, Ragnar.

In 2017, the company began an annual endorsement partnership with NFL offensive lineman Forrest Lamp. This included releasing the athlete’s first signature lamp, the Forrest Lamp, in 2020.

== Awards and recognition ==
- 2004 Internet Retailer Best of the Web Top 50 Retailing Sites
- 2006 Inductee to the Lighting Hall of Fame – Dennis K. Swanson
- 2007 Internet Retailer Top 500 Retail Web Sites
- 2019 eTail Best-in-Class Awards, Best Omni-Channel Retailer
- 2019 CommerceNexty Awards, Best Use of a New Channel

== Patents ==
Patent Number	Issue date
6916108	July 12, 2005
6860619	March 1, 2005
6264350	July 24, 2001
5997160	December 7, 1999
5620247	April 15, 1997
5567043	October 22, 1996
5330323	July 19, 1994
