= Unattended ground sensor =

Military technology

Unattended Ground Sensor
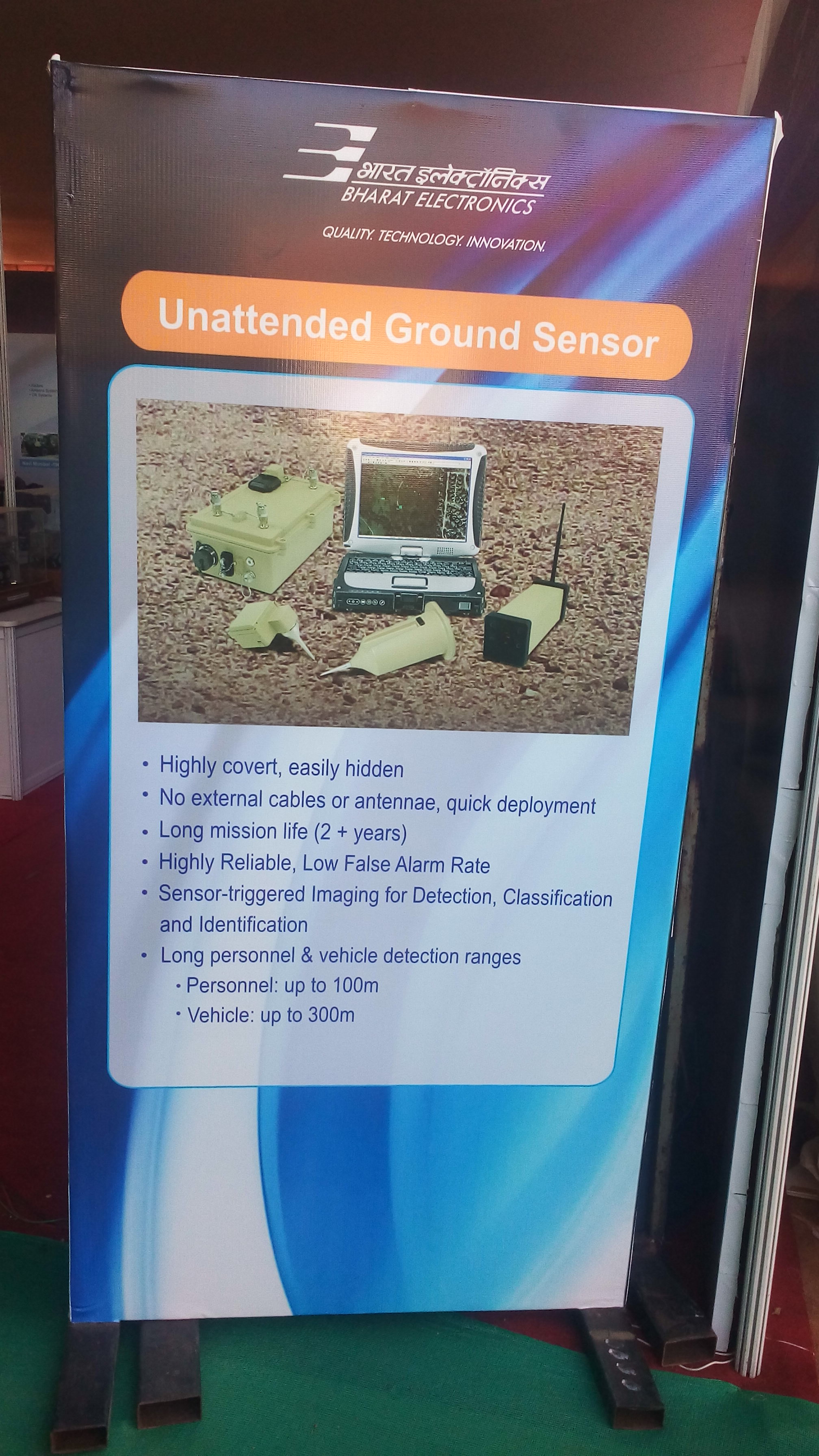
- Various T-UGS sensors
- Type: Unattended ground sensor

The Unattended Ground Sensor (UGS) are a variety of small sensors, generally covert, dedicated to detect and identify activities on the ground such as enemy soldiers or vehicles. UGS come as systems with an integrated communication network and processing capabilities.

== Future combat systems UGS ==
The unattended ground sensor were under development as part of the United States Army's Future Combat Systems Program. or CF UGS.

The CF UGS systems employ various sensor modalities including seismic, acoustic, magnetic, and pyroelectric transducers, daylight imagers and passive infrared imagers to automatically detect the presence of persons or vehicles, and transmit activity reports or imagery via radio-frequency (RF) or satellite communications (SATCOM) links to a remote processing, exploitation, and dissemination (PED) station. The systems are packaged for concealed emplacement in the field and for long-duration unattended operation.

The Army Research Laboratory developed unattended ground-sensor technologies for detection and tracking of personnel and vehicles for perimeter defense and border-monitoring applications. In 2005, the OmniSense system was commercialized and fielded.

The CF UGS program includes a family of sensors from various companies: Qual-Tron Inc (MIDS, EMIDS, MMIDS) E-UGS, Silent Watch, Falcon Watch, Scorpion, OmniSense and OmniSense-Enhanced. The current sources for CF UGS are Applied Research Associates (E-UGS), Harris Corporation (Silent Watch, Falcon Watch), Northrop Grumman-Xetron (Scorpion), McQ Inc (OmniSense, OmniSense-Enhanced).

There are two types of unattended ground sensors that are being fielded under the United States Army's Future Combat Systems Program, the Urban UGS or U-UGS and the Tactical UGS or T-UGS. The current generation is manufactured by Textron Defense Systems a subcontractor under Boeing.

=== Tactical unattended ground sensor ===
T-UGS are small ground-based sensors that collect intelligence through seismic, acoustic, radiological nuclear and electro-optic means. These sensors are networked devices that provide an early warning system to supplement a platoon size element and are capable of remote operation. To an extent T-UGS will detect, track, classify, and identify personnel and vehicles within its coverage area and report to the FCS Network in near real-time.

T-UGS comprises the following sensor systems:

- The gateway node, which is a router and data collector that sends information back to a FCS Network equipped vehicle.
- The intelligence surveillance and reconnaissance (ISR) node, which is the key component that acquires and tracks personnel, vehicles and aircraft through seismic and acoustic means.
- The electro-optic node obtains information from the ISR node and pans its camera toward the point of interest and is able to track and send images through the FCS Network.
- The radiological nuclear node is capable of measuring and reporting gamma dose-rate and accumulated dose from a fallout environment in a tactical battlefield situation. Detected radiological events will be transmitted via a detailed spot report through the gateway node to an operator on the FCS network.

=== Urban unattended ground sensor ===
For urban areas, the urban-unattended ground sensor (U-UGS) is used as a surveillance tool during building clearing operations, and in caves, sewers, tunnels, and other confined spaces. Textron Defense Systems, along with Honeywell, designed these wireless, hand emplaced system of sensors to be lightweight and low cost. The U-UGS network is capable of taking field-of-view images of intruders in all light conditions and transmits images to the FCS Network where immediate recognition of human intruders should be achieved, or, when imaging is not needed, by using the motion detector sensors only.

The proposed U-UGS sensors are made up of the following:

- The gateway bridges U-UGS sensor field to the FCS network and relays motion alarm and image data. It's capable to be monitored locally by a soldier or remotely through a FCS network enabled modulevehicle.
- The intrusion node is a motion sensor that detects movement and is able to tell the difference between animal and human beings.
- The imager node is a combination of motion sensor and all light condition capable imager camera to make pictorial identification easier.

=== OmniSense ===
The Army Research Laboratory (ARL) developed Omnisense for perimeter defense and border-monitoring applications in collaboration with McQ Inc. In 2005, the OmniSense system was commercialized and fielded by the U.S. Army.

Persistent surveillance sensors were deployed in quantity to war-fighting areas to monitor roads, borders, and areas of interest for insurgent activities. This networked UGS system connected users to remotely deployed sensors, enabling the receipt of target information and allowing for the remote reconfiguration of sensors The detected targets were tracked with either a daytime color camera or an uncooled nighttime infrared camera, so the user sees the target as it is detected.

The US Army has cited OmniSense as “One of the Greatest Inventions of 2006.”
