= Mission Essential =

American defense contractor

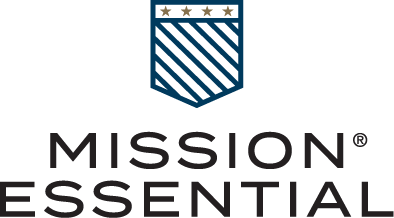
- Type: Private
- Industry: Language, training, technical support, intelligence
- Founded: Columbus, Ohio, U.S. (2004)
- Headquarters: New Albany, Ohio, U.S.
- Area served: Afghanistan, Middle East, Africa, Asia, Europe, U.S.
- Key people: Greg Miller-Chairman/CEO, Ralph Miller-CFO, Mark Quantock-COO
- Revenue: Less than $1 billion
- Number of employees: less than 1000
- Website: www.missionessential.com

Mission Essential (formerly Mission Essential Personnel or MEP) is a government contractor primarily serving intelligence and military clients. It is a provider of translators and interpreters to the US government. The company is based in New Albany, Ohio, with an office in Herndon, Virginia.

== Services ==
Mission Essential's goal is to operate missions regarded as "high-consequence" to defense, diplomatic, intelligence community and law enforcement customers, and multinationals and foreign governments. The company tries to combat terrorism, transnational crime, natural disasters, and other hazards. Its three tranches of service are: Intelligence & Insight (such as All-Source Analysis and ISR operations), Development & Capacity Building (such as counter-narcotics and cultural advisory), and Readiness & Resilience (including emergency management, training, and continuity of operations). Mission Essential is of confidential work.

=== Intelligence and insight ===
In August 2010, the U.S. Army named Mission Essential as a winner of a five-year, Indefinite Delivery/Indefinite Quantity Intelligence Support Services contract, with a ceiling of $492 million. In September 2010, Mission Essential won a spot on the multimillion-dollar Intelligence Support Services – Afghanistan (ISS-A) contract vehicle providing MULTI-INT operations in support of CENTCOM. The company won three task orders on ISS-A providing MULTI-INT operations support in March 2012 and another in September 2013. Mission Essential has also won work with the Defense Intelligence Agency on the Solutions for Intelligence Analysis (SIA) II vehicle. Intelligence analyst Marisa Freese, who joined the company after her time serving in the military, said, "Mission Essential gives me an opportunity to continue working in the Intelligence Community. The work is really important. Everything we do is to protect our nation's security."

=== Development and capacity building ===
Mission Essential has assisted in capacity building, counter-narcotics, multi-national law enforcement, and border management. It has included former top DEA operative Mike Vigil, who infiltrated drug cartels during his decades with the DEA as detailed in his memoirs "Deal."

==== 2009 Maersk Alabama hijacking ====
In April 2009, Somali pirates hijacked the Maersk vessel Alabama and took the ship's captain and crew hostage. A Mission Essential interpreter assisted negotiation with the pirates during the crisis, alongside a Navy SEAL team. After four days of negotiations, they convinced the pirates to allow their boat to be towed behind the USS Bainbridge, until US snipers killed three of the pirates and captured a fourth, Abduwali Abdukhadir Muse, rescuing the hostages.

The linguist was portrayed in the 2013 film Captain Phillips by Omar Berdouni.

=== Readiness and resilience ===
Mission Essential also provides training and technical support to its clients, notably first responders. In spring 2010, it won a contract to teach the Air Force's Combat Airman Skills Training program, where instructors train airmen and women in combat and survival skills. Mission Essential has coordinated a response at the U.S. Air Force Expeditionary Center at Joint Base McGuire–Dix–Lakehurst, New Jersey. In 2013, the company conducted a high-profile disaster training operation in Butlerville, Indiana.

==== Contract management ====
In 2012, Mission Essential's contract changed to reflect changing budgets for the Afghanistan military effort. The company deployed a 50-person transition team to visit 7,000 of its personnel in remote locations throughout the warzone. 99.7% of the employees stayed on board.

==== Recruitment ====
The primary languages needed by the military in Afghanistan are Dari and Pashto. According to the 2000 census, only 7,700 U.S. citizens speak fluent Pashto, and of those, Mission Essential says about half meet health and other clearance requirements. The company employs more than 1,000 of these citizens. To fill the rest of the military's requirements, Mission Essential also relies on more than 4,000 Afghan local national linguists. The Washington Post profiled Mission Essential's domestic recruiting at the Afghan Cup, an annual soccer tournament in the Washington area, where the company recruited 45 linguists in 2008 under the slogan "For America, For Afghanistan, For Me."

== Company profile ==
=== History ===
Mission Essential was founded in early 2004 by army Special Forces veteran Greg Miller. The company started as a subcontractor providing a handful of linguists in Iraq, but in 2007, Mission Essential Personnel won a $703 million Afghanistan language contract in support of the Operation Enduring Freedom.

According to Reuters, "The 'terps,' as the soldiers call them in military slang, don't just do literal translations, they provide insights into local culture and customs that are key to any attempt to win the people over. And above all, their ability to read the situation on the ground can often save lives." The Columbus Dispatch profiled one US-hired Mission Essential translator, who said that while the work is often dangerous, "The belief in the cause and what I was working for undermined that fear. This is the process that will take us to a greater future and a better life for my people. Going back [to Afghanistan] is an opportunity to help this happen."

Due to increased demands, the army continued to raise Mission Essential's contract ceiling and linguist requirements.

In 2010, a member of the Commission on Wartime Contracting called the company, "A great American success story." Mission Essential was named the No. 1 language services provider by the Common Sense Advisory Board in 2011 and again in 2012.

In 2013, MEP went through a major rebranding, changing its name to Mission Essential. In October 2014, the company released a Spanish version of its website, as part of its "inroads into Latin America."

In August 2016, Mission Essential acquired Information Management Technology Corporation (IMT). IMT is the lead technical support and provider for the Integrated Broadcast Service (IBS) Enterprise, the Defense Department's worldwide satellite-connected communications network, threat warning, and targeting data to Joint Service and Allied partner decision-makers and operators.

=== Charity ===
Mission Essential made charitable giving a part of its corporate philosophy.

Mission Essential support Ride 2 Recovery, which treats injured vets by using cycling for rehabilitation. In November 2013, Mission Essential donated $25,000 to Ride 2 Recovery at an Honor Ride. In May 2014, Mission Essential sponsored the first annual Memorial Day Weekend Honor Ride in Central Ohio. The event enlisted more than 500 riders, raised $140,000, and generated coverage from local television affiliates. The Second Annual Honor Ride was held on Memorial Day Weekend, May 23, 2015, with over 900 cyclists participating and over $300,000 raised.

In January 2013, Mission Essential donated $26,000 to the Wounded Warrior Project office in Fayetteville, North Carolina, as a result of organizing the largest charity run in Afghanistan with more than 1,400 runners at US military bases in Bagram and Kandahar. Paul Clemens said, "As partners with the US military, Mission Essential recognizes their sacrifices, and the importance of supporting those who truly enable freedom. In one form or another, Mission Essential has contributed to several Wounded Warrior Project events, but none as impressive as this."

Mission Essential employees stationed in the Horn of Africa co-founded the Camp Lemonnier Cheetah Refuge Volunteer Program, which clears invasive tree species at the DECAN animal refuge and tends to the needs of the animals. Mission Essential's Scott Johnson said, "The ultimate goal of the refuge is to eventually release the animals back to the wild."

From 2010 to 2014, Mission Essential funded a scholarship program to provide tuition and accommodations for students at the American University of Afghanistan.

== Controversies ==
=== Use of fraudulent linguists ===
The allegations started with Obama's 2009 to 2012 "surge" of troops in Afghanistan and the need for Dari and Pashto speakers who could be granted top-secret security clearances. Only a few thousand people across the country qualified. A small contractor called Mission Essential Personnel (MEP) had a $679 million contract. Linguists make over $200,000 a year; successful recruiters got bonuses of $250 to $2,500. Problems were discovered at FedSys, a Crystal City subcontractor for MEP. A recruiter named Abdul Aman was fired by FedSys and accused of helping people cheat. The case was investigated by the Special Inspector General for Afghanistan Reconstruction (SIGAR). Internal documents indicate billions of dollars were involved.

=== Immigration visas ===
Local National Linguists (LNLs) frequently apply for Special Immigration Visas to the United States, or for equivalent asylum with other foreign governments.

==== Danish government ====
In 2013, reports surfaced that the Danish government was missing information that it needed to process Mission Essential linguists, such as names and employment periods, who sought asylum in Denmark after helping the country's efforts in Afghanistan. The issue was quickly resolved. The Danish Minister of Defense Nicolai Wammen said, "Mission Essential will assist in validating information about employment for interpreters who make contact with the Danish authorities. This arrangement is similar to the arrangement which Mission Essential has with the US Government."

=== Care of linguists ===
In 2009, Corpwatch, a non-profit foundation focused on oversight of government contractors, accused the company of failing to care adequately for wounded local national linguists, including being slow to pay insurance benefits. MEP countered that it

files all claims and intervenes on behalf of our linguists with insurance companies and claims investigators. In cases where insurance payments are delayed, we directly intervene on behalf of our linguists to ensure our professionals get what they are due. When complaints of delayed payments first arose in 2009, MEP deployed Defense Base Act (DBA) insurance subject matter experts to Afghanistan to respond. At that time, there were 170 outstanding insurance claims. As of July 2010, there were 28. MEP's goal is always zero outstanding claims.

In fall 2010, Corpwatch's Pratap Chatterjee told Columbus Monthly, "I personally believe that MEP cares about the translators and tries to do a good job for them. The reality is beyond [then CEO] Chris Taylor's control."

Corpwatch also claimed MEP underpays its local national linguists (LNLs). In a fact sheet, the company said, "Local nationals are paid well by the standards of their community. MEP's LNLs are compensated better than doctors and cabinet-level officials in Afghanistan. MEP presently has a backlog of more than 600 Afghan nationals waiting to become linguists."

On The World of Troubles blog, journalist Jim Foley wrote that MEP was withholding pay from some linguists in dangerous areas. MEP responded that government regulations require a sometimes "cumbersome process which requires signatures from both MEP managers and military points of contact" and without those, pay cannot be disbursed. MEP further noted that the payroll problem had been successfully noted and resolved before Foley published his article.

MEP has also been charged with deploying interpreters who were old or otherwise physically unfit. MEP's response was that it recruits, vets, and trains linguists according to the military's specifications, but does not control their final assignments throughout Afghanistan.

=== ABC News report and lawsuit ===
In September 2010, ABC News' Brian Ross quoted a former MEP employee who alleged in a whistleblower lawsuit that the company had sent unqualified linguists to Afghanistan two years earlier. Disparate commentators criticized ABC's coverage of the story. The Huffington Post's David Isenberg pointed out Ross's use of "weak, secondary sources," and the former employee's financial motives in bringing the case. The American Spectator's Jed Babbin said Ross had "cobbled together information from irrelevant or financially interested sources." Two weeks after the original report aired, the network published a follow-up on its website when US District Judge Leonie Brinkema dismissed the case against MEP without prejudice.

When the case was refiled in November 2010, the same judge allowed the case against MEP to move forward. On February 10, 2011, the lawsuit was dismissed.

=== 2010 Afghanistan shooting incident ===
In January 2010, Mission Essential linguist Ahmad Nasir Ahmadi fired on U.S. personnel in Afghanistan, killing two soldiers and wounding a third before he was killed by an alert army sergeant. Nearly 18 months later, the survivor and family members of the deceased soldiers filed a lawsuit against MEP.

In response, MEP released a statement saying that the army had conducted a thorough investigation of the incident and found the shooting was "the result of the unforeseeable criminal acts" of the shooter, who had been vetted and approved by the US Government. MEP also noted that it had not issued Ahmadi a weapon nor authorized him to use one.

== Awards ==
Mission Essential has won several awards.

It won the Entrepreneurs of the Year for Emerging Markets in 2006 and the Business First Fast Fifty in 2007 and 2008. Mission Essential made Inc. magazine's annual roll of the 500 fastest growing companies in 2009–2011.

Washington Technology has listed the company among its Top 100 Government Contractors since 2009, reaching its highest point to date in 2013 at No. 31. Defense News named Mission Essential to its list of Top 100 defense contractors in 2012, 2013, and 2014.

The Association of the United States Army named Mission Essential its member company of the month for July 2012, noting that, "For the current conflicts with which the US Army is involved, communication can be more valuable than weaponry: so the United States can share its message of good will with those we can help while deciphering the message of those who would do us harm."

In 2010, Mission Essential's ad campaigns won awards from the Columbus Society for Communicating Arts. In 2011, the Columbus Business Journal named Mission Essential the No. 1 government contractor in Central Ohio.

== See also ==
- List of United States defense contractors
