= Squad Mission Support System =

Unmanned all terrain wheeled vehicle

Squad Mission Support System is an unmanned all terrain wheeled vehicle developed by Lockheed Martin.

== History ==
The SMSS was developed for the US Army as transport and logistics support by Lockheed Martin Missiles and Fire Control division. The SMSS Block 0 could travel up to 15 miles per hour (24 km/h) and carry up to 1,200 pounds (540 kg) in gear. Unloaded, it weighed up to 4,000 lb (1,800 kg) and could potentially be parachuted from an aircraft. It can be driven by an operator or remotely operated, or operate in supervised autonomy. Currently, the SMSS is unarmed, but there are plans to arm it with either RPG or small missile systems.

The SMSS Block 1 went to Afghanistan for a military utility assessment in late 2011. The Block 1 version has a lighter frame, infrared driving lights, a smaller and more efficient sensor package, and insulated exhaust and hydraulics that make them quieter in the field. It is heavier, at 3,800 lb (1,700 kg) unloaded, but can carry a larger, 1,200 lb (540 kg) payload, and has a 125 mi (201 km) operating range. The SMSS can operate autonomously, be programmed to "follow the leader," be tele-operated, or controlled manually by getting on the vehicle and using a joystick to steer. The vehicle has a litter-carrying kit for casualty evacuation.

Four vehicles were deployed to Afghanistan. They were used to resupplying small combat outposts and strongpoints, and construction projects on its larger forward operating base. One unit used the SMSS to carry a total of10,000 lb (4,500 kg) of supplies over the course of two days to a small combat outpost two kilometers away, regularly carrying 2,000-pound loads. One time, soldiers overloaded one vehicle up with filled sandbags, which were estimated to weigh 4,000 lb (1,800 kg) (exceeding Lockheed’s recommended carrying weight of 1,200 pounds), and successfully drove it up a 30-degree slope. While initially planned as a squad-level asset, it was used more at the platoon level. From fielding experiences, Lockheed planned improvements to the system, considering adding another alternator to increase its power output since one group of soldiers in Afghanistan had been trying to use it as a mobile operations center by loading it up with generators and batteries while out on missions. Lockheed is also considering adding a manipulator arm so it can load and unload cargo itself. The deployment to Afghanistan for operational evaluations lasted from January to May 2012.

In February 2013, the SMSS performed a successful demonstration while being controlled by satellite 200 mi (320 km) from its operator. The vehicle had an adjustable-height mast with a Gyrocam 9M, acquiring on-the-move, high-resolution electro-optical and thermal video. Movement and sensor functions were controlled from a remote station via teleoperation. In a simulated mission, the operator provided a pre-planned route and SMSS autonomy allowed navigation with minimal operator intervention, while other autonomous functions, such as follow-me, go-to-point and retro-traverse, were also demonstrated. The demonstration proved that the combination of autonomy, vehicle mobility, surveillance sensors, and satellite communications can provide a means of battlefield situational awareness without human intervention.

From 7-10 October 2013, the SMSS took part in testing, along with other systems, at Fort Benning, Georgia as part of the U.S. Army's Squad Multipurpose Equipment Transport (S-MET) program. The program objective is to find an unmanned robotic platform to transport soldier equipment and charge batteries for their electronic gear. Requirements for the vehicle are to carry 1,000 lb (450 kg) of gear, equal to the amount a nine-man infantry squad would need on a 72-hour mission. Cubic volume is seen as more of a problem for load-carrying unmanned vehicles, as their center of gravity changes when more gear has to be stacked. It has to travel 4 km/h (2.5 mph) for eight-hour marches and speed up in bursts of up to 38 km/h (24 mph) for 200 meters. The proposed S-MET vehicle needs to traverse forward and backward on slopes of up to 30 percent and descending on slopes of 60 percent. Moving on rough terrain was a challenge for the four SMSS vehicles deployed to Afghanistan in 2012; they could not discern between soldiers and obstacles like trees, so they mostly traveled on roads instead of complex terrain. The SMSS was not selected to continue S-MET trials.

On 7 August 2014, the SMSS was used in an exercise at Fort Benning to combine the abilities of both an unmanned ground vehicle and unmanned aerial vehicle. It involved the SMSS and an unmanned K-MAX helicopter, both Lockheed Martin systems, operating in a simulated area deemed too risky for human presence. The K-MAX autonomously transported the SMSS by sling load into the area and set it down over an intended point, releasing it upon command from a remote operator. The K-MAX returned to base, then the SMSS used autonomous operation and limited teleoperation from a remote site to move around the area. Once deployed, the vehicle used a mast-mounted Gyrocam electro-optical sensor and satellite communications (SATCOM) terminal with a data-link for area surveillance. The exercise was intended to demonstrate that large UAVs and UGVs could operate alongside each other by themselves and beyond line-of-sight to perform missions to keep personnel out of harm's way.
