= Sergio Orozco =

Colombian designer (born 20th century)

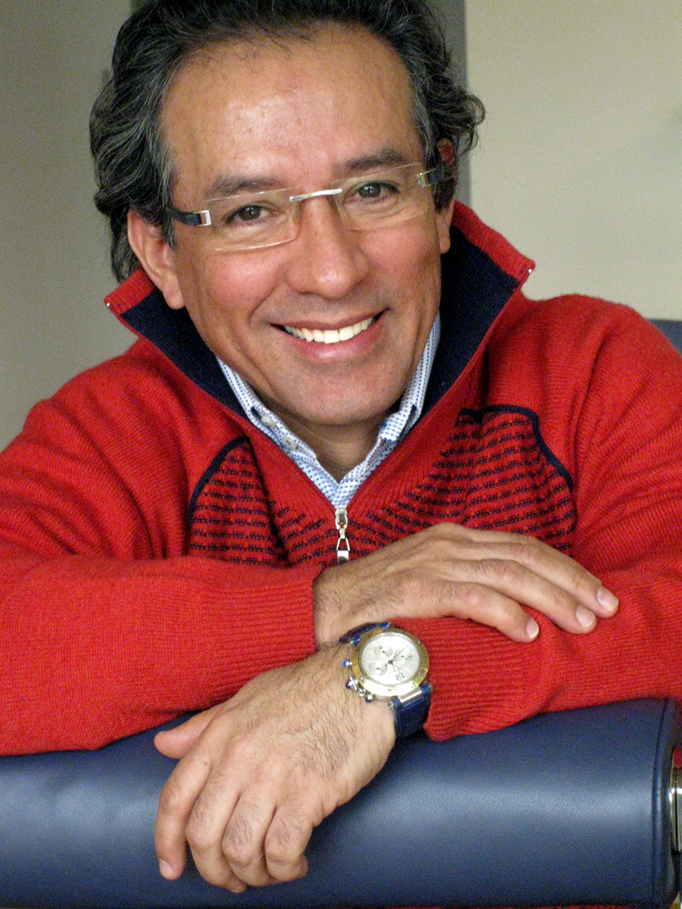
Sergio Orozco, 2011

Sergio Orozco (born in the 20th century in Popayán, Colombia) is a Colombian designer of furniture and lighting.

== Biography ==
Orozco studied violin for many years, then at the age of eighteen he moved to Colombia's capital, Bogotá, planning to pursue his musical studies. His goals changed, however, when he found he was developing even more serious interest in art, design and architecture.

After two years of fine-wood model making and musical-instrument construction in Bogotá, he moved to Europe where he traveled extensively and studied painting, sculpture and design.

In 1980, Orozco went to New York City where he attended Parsons The New School for Design.

In 1989, he founded Sergio Orozco Design Inc.

== Lighting designs ==
In the early 1990s, Orozco designed ceiling fans for Craftmade with the Firenze and Savona.
