= Stolt-Nielsen S.A. v. AnimalFeeds International Corp. =

- Supreme Court of the United States

Decided April 27, 2010
- Full case name: Stolt-Nielsen S.A. v. AnimalFeeds International Corp.
- Citations: 559 U.S. 662 (more)

Holding
- Class action arbitration is permitted under the FAA only if all parties specifically agree to it.

Court membership
- Chief Justice John Roberts Associate Justices John P. Stevens · Antonin Scalia; Anthony Kennedy · Clarence Thomas; Ruth Bader Ginsburg · Stephen Breyer; Samuel Alito · Sonia Sotomayor

Laws applied
- Federal Arbitration Act

Stolt-Nielsen S.A. v. AnimalFeeds International Corp., 559 U.S. 662 (2010), was a United States Supreme Court case in which the court held that class action arbitration is permitted under the Federal Arbitration Act only if all parties specifically agree to it.

== Background ==
Shipping companies such as Stolt-Nielsen serve much of the world market for parcel tankers—seagoing vessels with compartments that are separately chartered to customers, such as AnimalFeeds, who wish to ship liquids in small quantities. AnimalFeeds ships its goods pursuant to a standard contract known in the maritime trade as a charter party. The charter party that AnimalFeeds uses contains an arbitration clause.

AnimalFeeds brought a class action antitrust suit against the shipping company for price fixing, and that suit was consolidated with similar suits brought by other charterers, including one in which the Second Circuit Court of Appeals subsequently reversed a lower court ruling that the charterers' claims were not subject to arbitration. As a consequence, the parties in this case agreed that they must arbitrate their antitrust dispute.

AnimalFeeds sought arbitration on behalf of a class of purchasers of parcel tanker transportation services. The parties agreed to submit the question whether their arbitration agreement allowed for class arbitration to a panel of arbitrators, who would be bound by rules (Class Rules) developed by the American Arbitration Association following Green Tree Financial Corp. v. Bazzle, 539 U.S. 444. One Class Rule requires an arbitrator to determine whether an arbitration clause permits class arbitration. The parties selected an arbitration panel, designated New York City as the arbitration site, and stipulated that their arbitration clause was "silent" on the class arbitration issue. The panel determined that the arbitration clause allowed for class arbitration, but the federal District Court vacated the award.

The District Court concluded that the arbitrators' award was made in "manifest disregard" of the law, for had the arbitrators conducted a choice-of-law analysis, they would have applied the rule of federal maritime law requiring contracts to be interpreted in light of custom and usage. The Second Circuit reversed, holding that because petitioners had cited no authority applying a maritime rule of custom and usage against class arbitration, the arbitrators' decision was not in manifest disregard of maritime law; and that the arbitrators had not manifestly disregarded New York law, which had not established a rule against class arbitration.

== Opinion of the court ==
The Supreme Court issued an opinion on April 27, 2010.
