= Premier America Credit Union =

Credit union

- Formerly: Litton Employees Federal Credit Union
- Founded: 1957
- Headquarters: Chatsworth, California
- Website: www.premieramerica.com

Premier America Credit Union is a member-owned financial cooperative founded in 1957. Headquartered in the United States, it is one of the nation’s largest credit unions, serving more than 100,000 members and managing nearly $4 billion in assets.

Premier America operates with a not-for-profit structure, where each member is considered a partial owner of the credit union. Members have voting rights and the ability to elect a volunteer Board of Directors, ensuring representation and governance aligned with member interests.

The credit union provides a wide range of financial services, including savings and checking accounts, consumer and mortgage loans, and financial counseling. Members have access to a broad retail branch network, over 30,000 surcharge-free ATMs, and digital services such as online and mobile banking.

Eligibility for membership includes individuals who live, work, worship, or attend school in Los Angeles and Ventura counties in California, as well as Harris County in Texas.

Premier America Credit Union follows the broader credit union philosophy of “people helping people,” offering competitive savings rates, affordable loan products, and community-oriented financial solutions.

Premier America Foundation

The Premier America Foundation is the charitable arm of Premier America Credit Union, established in 2017 to extend the credit union’s commitment to financial empowerment and community development. It is a nonprofit 501(c)(3) organization dedicated to supporting financial education and wellness initiatives, particularly among youth, young adults, and underserved communities.

The Foundation carries out its mission through strategic partnerships with schools, philanthropic institutions, and local organizations. Its initiatives include outreach programs, inclusive financial education, and capital impact projects aimed at fostering long-term economic stability and improved financial decision-making.

In addition to its educational focus, the Foundation actively addresses food insecurity. It has contributed over $25,000 to local food pantries, distributed grocery gift cards through community colleges, and organized food donation drives at Premier America branch locations.

Notably, Premier America Credit Union underwrites all salaries and administrative expenses associated with the Foundation, ensuring that more than 95% of all donated funds directly support its community programs and services.

== Mergers and acquisitions ==
In 2008, Premier America Credit Union acquired Top Premium Finance Company, a California insurance premium finance company.

In 2012, Premier America Credit Union acquired Telesis Community Credit Union.

In 2014, Premier America merged with NBCU Employees Federal Credit Union.

In 2015, Premier America merged with Pacific Oaks Federal Credit Union.

== Membership ==
- Los Angeles County, California
- Ventura County, California
- Santa Clarita Valley
- San Fernando Valley
- Harris County, Texas

== Services provided ==
Premier America member-owners have access to their accounts through Online & Mobile Banking, Mobile Deposit, Zelle® (Person-to-Person Transfer), 30,000+ Free ATMs nationwide and 5,000+ Shared Branches Nationwide.
