= Willow Sports Car =

Defunct American motor vehicle manufacturer

The Willow was a 2-Seat Sports Car kit produced by Seltzer Motor Industries, Chatsworth, California. It is known to be the first transverse, inline 4-cylinder, mid-engined kit car ever offered to the public.

== Brief history ==
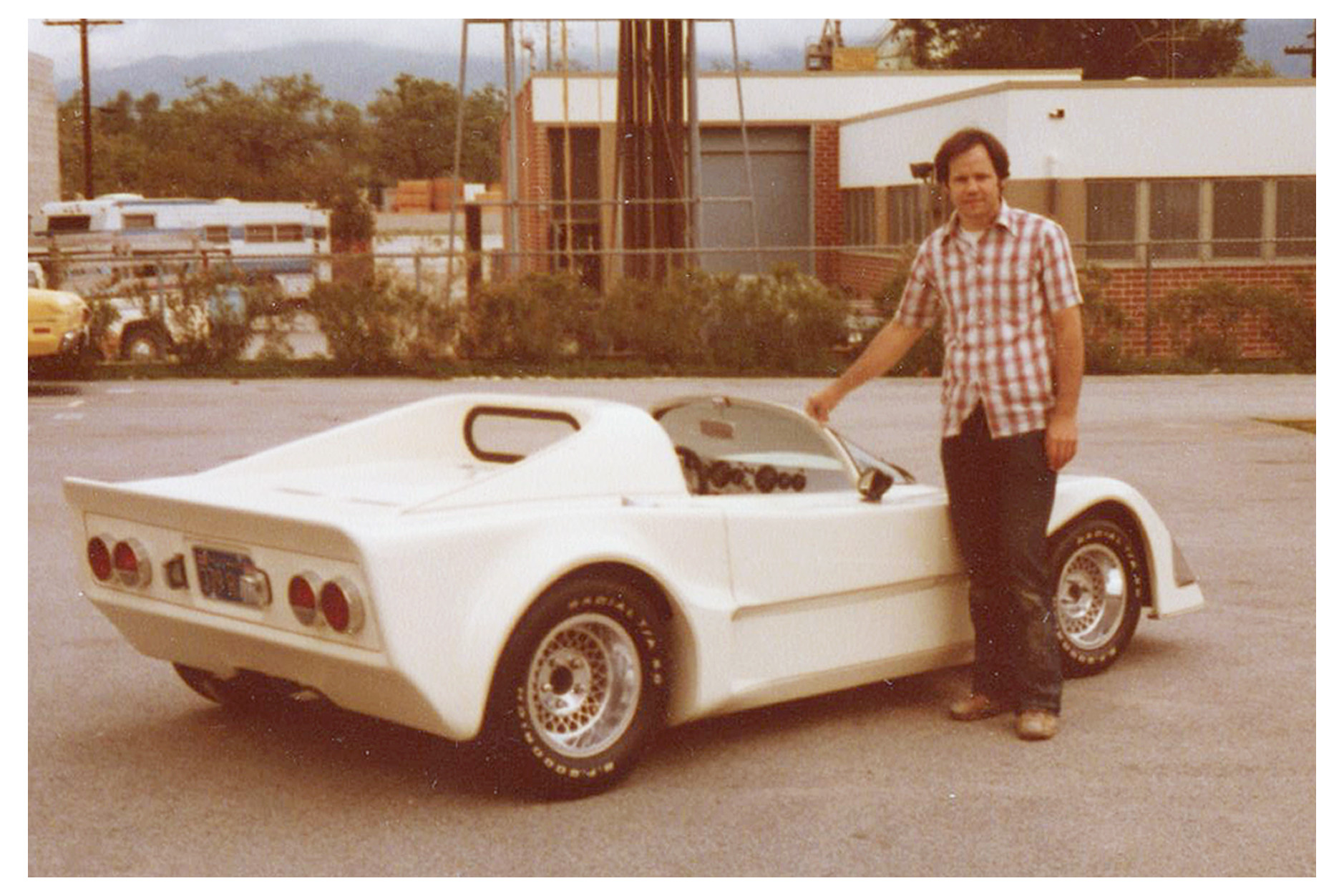
Eric Seltzer with 1979 Willow Sports Car, April 17, 1979.

The Willow Sports Car was designed and produced in the United States from 1979 to 1981 by Seltzer Motor Industries, Chatsworth, California. It was designed by Eric Seltzer, a mechanical engineer, and former racer in SCCA road racing in the Formula-B and Formula-Ford classes. In the early 1970s Mr. Seltzer assisted Le Grand Race Cars in developing a new Formula-Ford, the Mk 13B, and a new B-Sports Racing car, the Mk16. His experience in building and racing cars during this period led him to think about designing and building a street sports car kit that would far outperform the majority of kit cars of the time which were mostly Volkswagen based and so were under-powered and had poor handling characteristics.

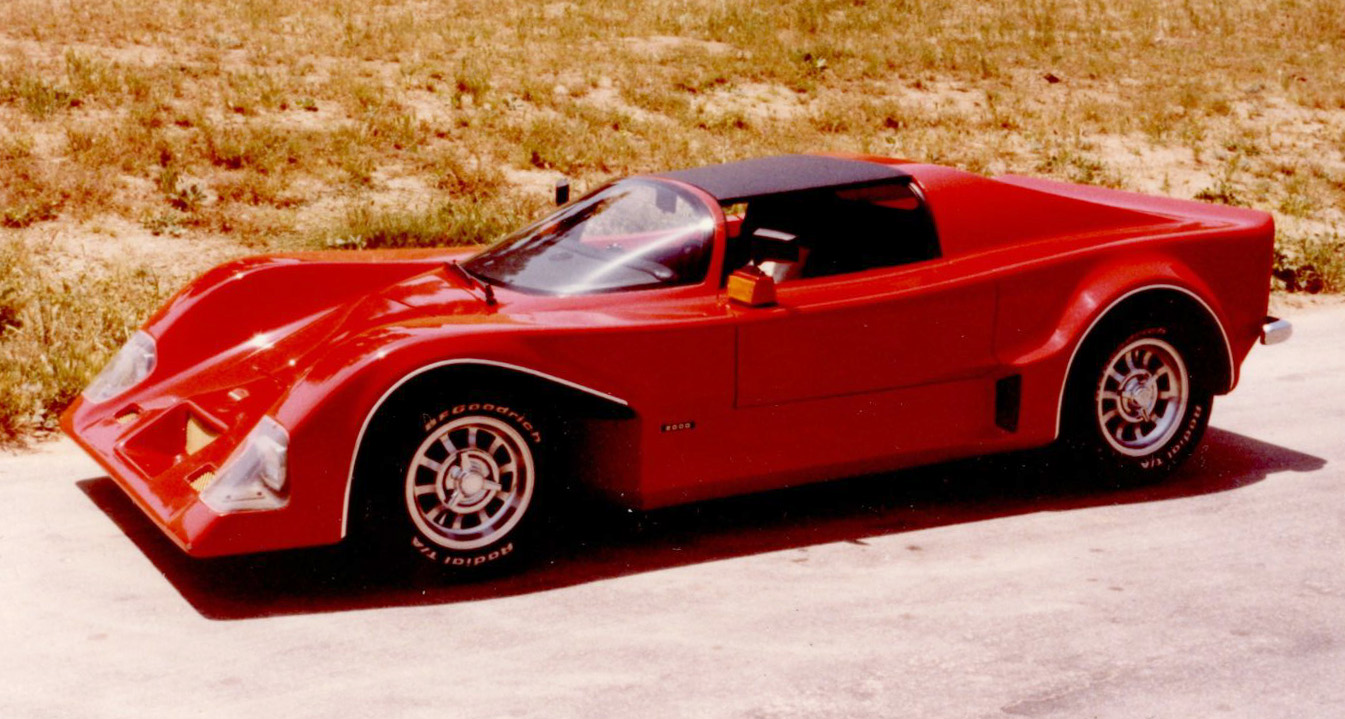
1980 Willow with removable top in place, Chatsworth, CA 5-21-81.

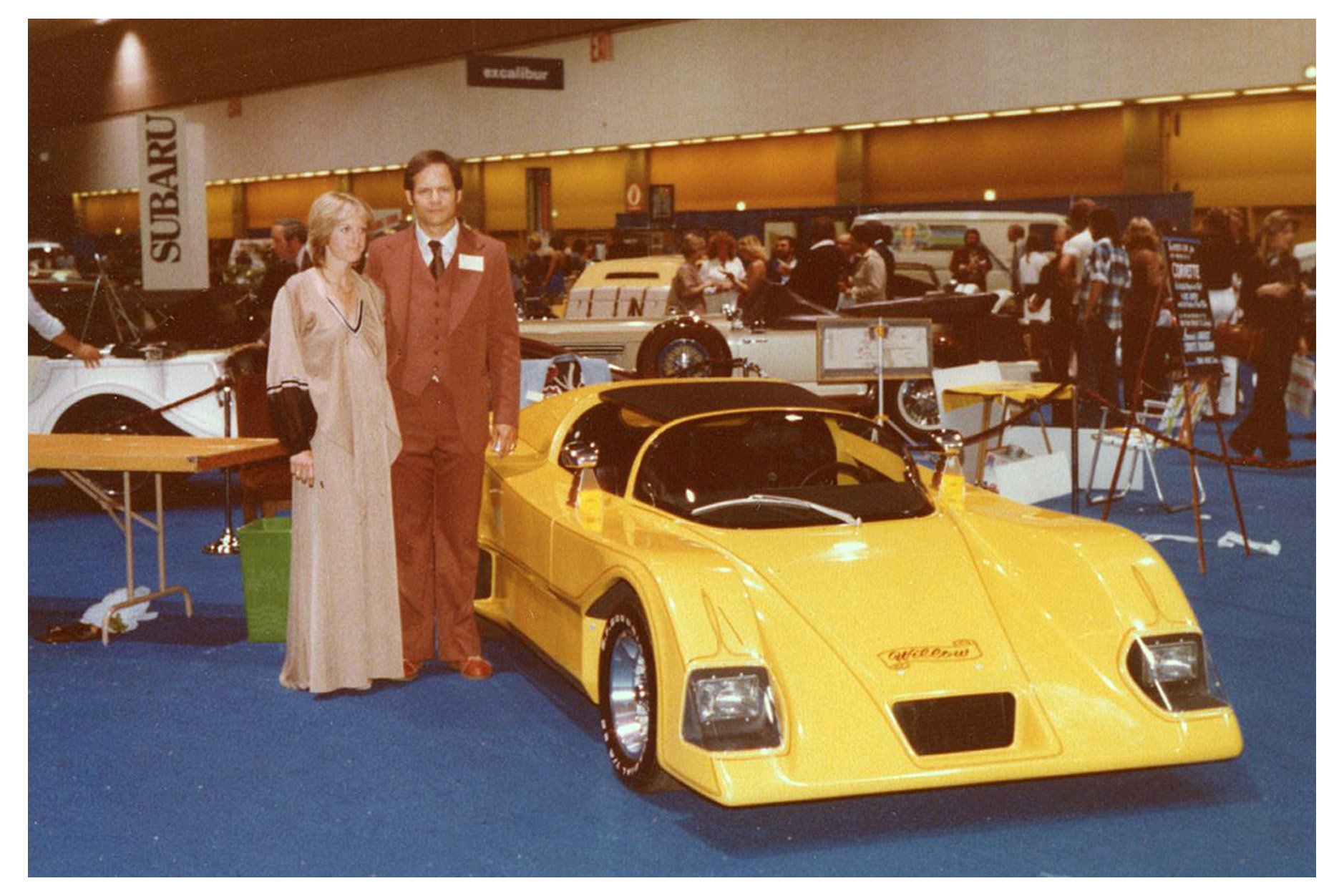
Eric Seltzer with wife Melinda, '79 Willow, Los Angeles Auto Expo, L.A. Convention Center, May 11, 1979.

In early 1977 Mr. Seltzer began the design process for what was to become the Willow Sports Car Kit. It took the next two years to complete the design of the frame and body, build body molds, build frame fixtures to reproduce the multi-tube steel frames, and make the kit ready for sale to the public. Mr. Seltzer got the name Willow from Willow Springs Raceway in Rosamond, California, a track that was known for favoring light weight, good handling cars over heavier cars with more horsepower.

The first Willow brochure in 1979 described the vehicle: “The Willow Sports Car Kit is designed for the individual who is looking for a two-seat sports car that has been engineered from the frame up, without compromise, for total performance. All suspension and drivetrain components have been selected for their design superiority and durability.

The Willow’s body design, along with its spirited performance and handling, create the excitement of “Can Am” and European sports car racing, while at the same time offering comfortable seating for two and reliability of components.

The Willow is a totally unique automobile, there is simply no other car from a kit car builder that can offer the engineering and design features that the Willow has. Compare and decide for yourself.” Seltzer Motor Industries had three kits available for building a Willow: Stage I, Basic Kit; Stage II, Completion Kit; and Stage III, Suggested Additional Parts. To build a complete Willow all three kits had to be purchased, although Stage III was optional if the builder wanted to supply their own drivetrain and suspension.

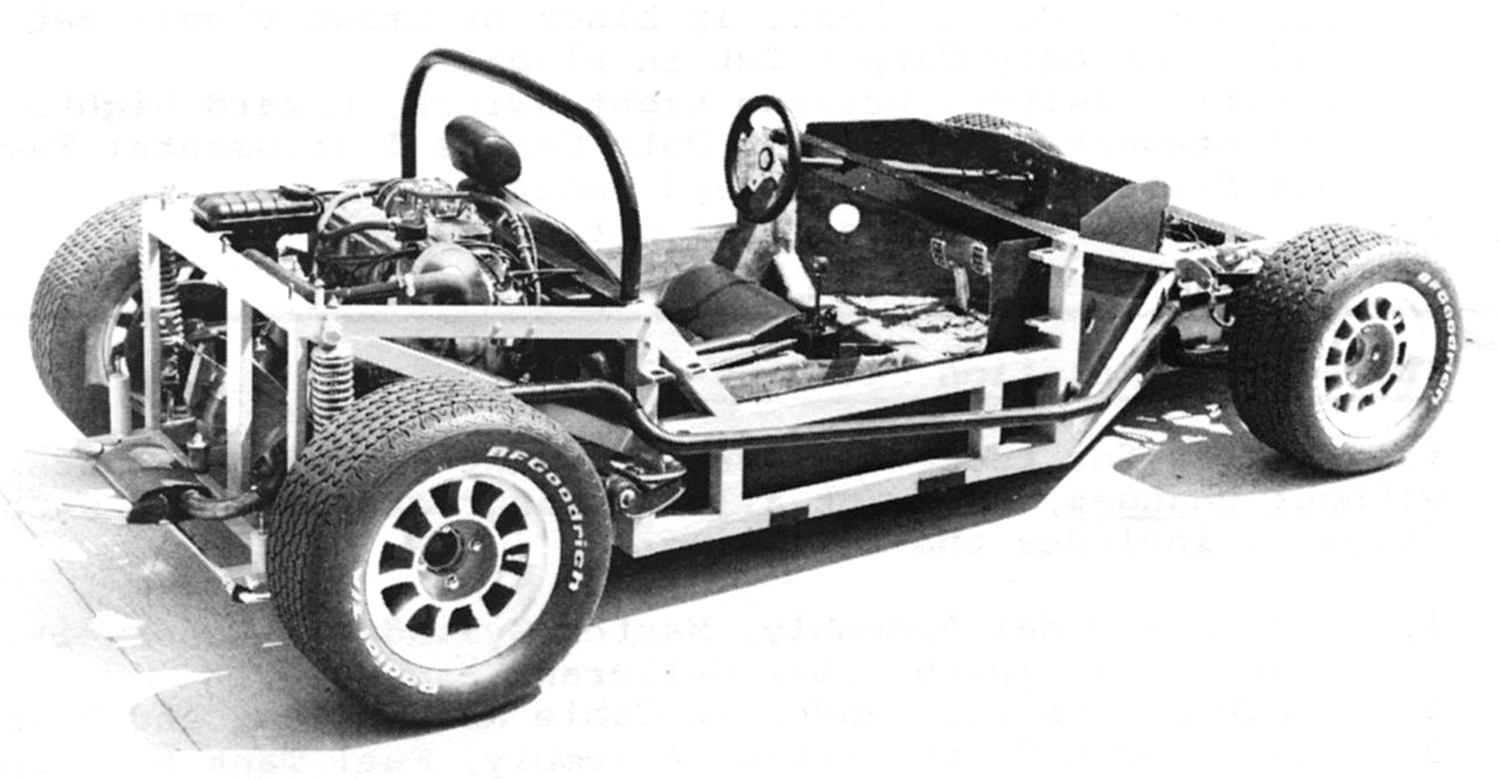
1980 Willow, body removed showing transverse mid-engine & rugged space-frame, 8-7-80.

== Specifications ==
Transverse, Mid-Engine: Ford Pinto 2000 4-cyl. OHC, 100HP. Transaxle: Ford Fiesta 4-speed. Front Suspension, Disc Brakes, Steering: Triumph Spitfire or GT6. Rear Suspension, Disc Brakes: Porsche 914. Body: Top quality fiberglass construction, mounted by (14) rubber Lord mounts. Frame: Custom multi-tube steel frame with roll-over bar and side-impact beams in the doors.

== Dimensions ==
Wheelbase: 91.0 inches. Overall length: 148.0 inches. Overall width: 69.0 inches. Height: 41.0 inches. Curb weight: 1750 pounds.

The kits were offered in three forms: Stage I, the Basic Kit; Stage II, the Completion Kit; and Stage III, Suggested Additional Parts (includes an engine, transaxle, front & rear suspension & brakes, wheels & tires).

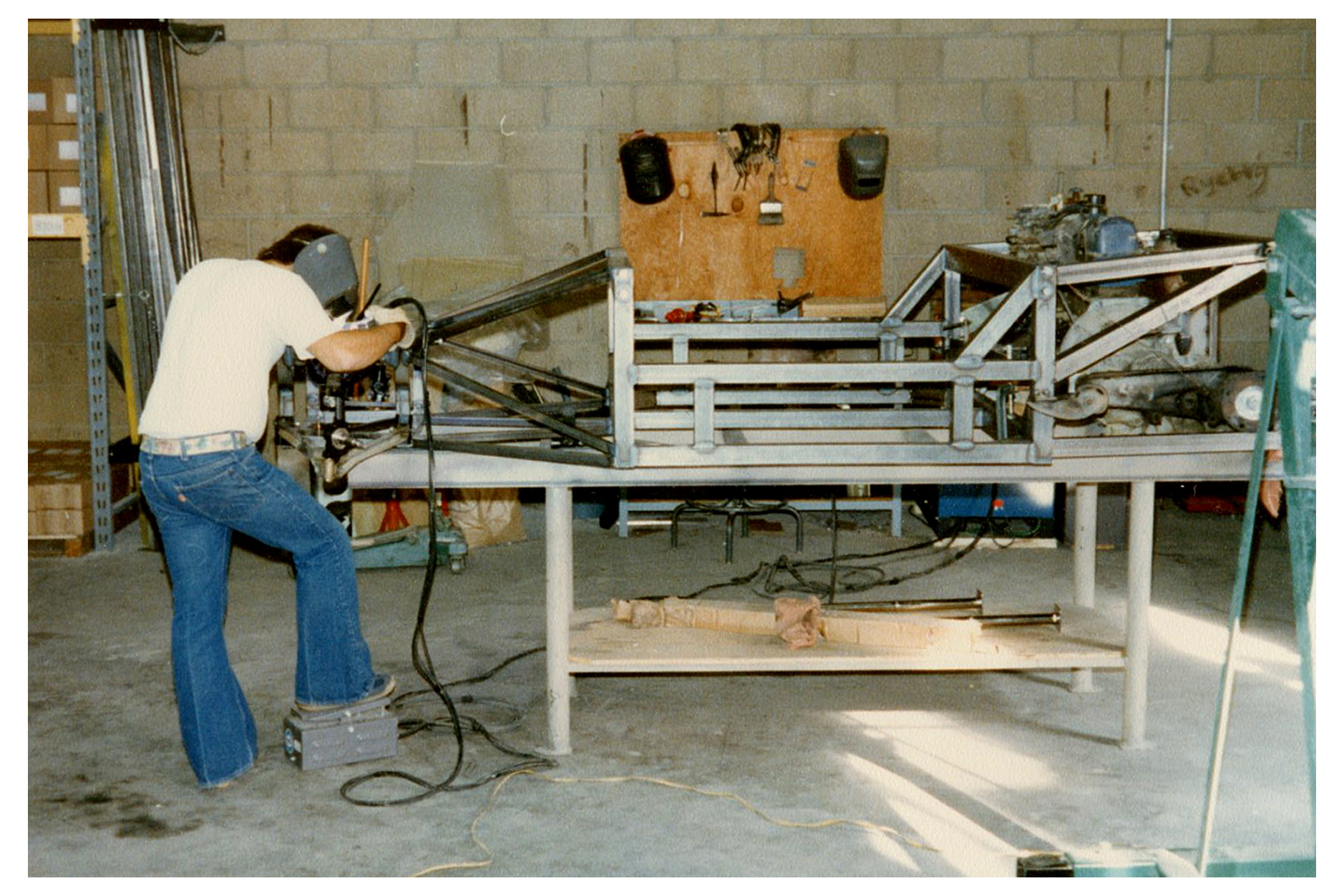
Willow frames being welded using a Miller Dialarc MIG-welder, welding shop, Seltzer Motor Industries, 9-24-79.

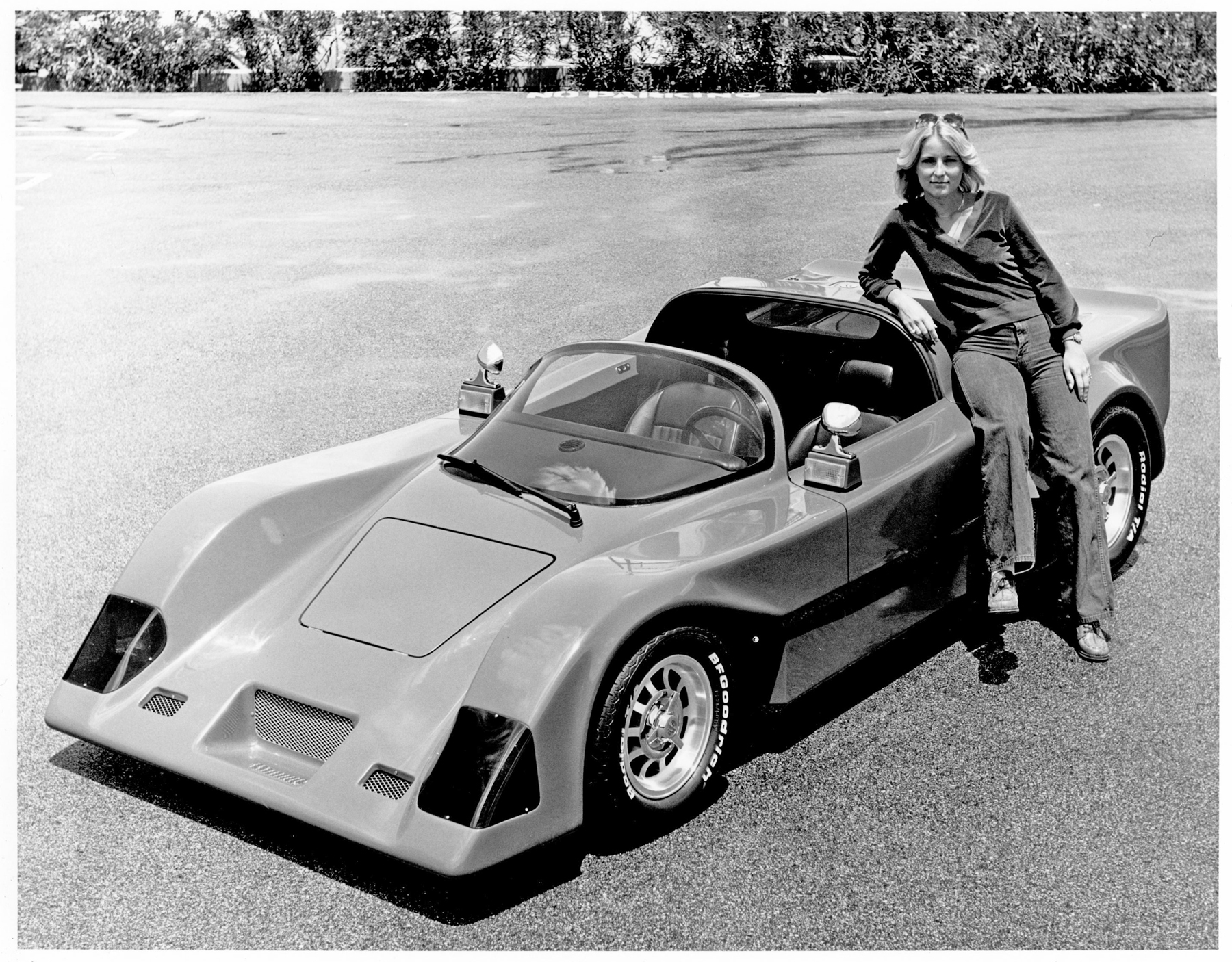
1980 Willow publicity photo at Seltzer Motor Ind. dated 5-28-80

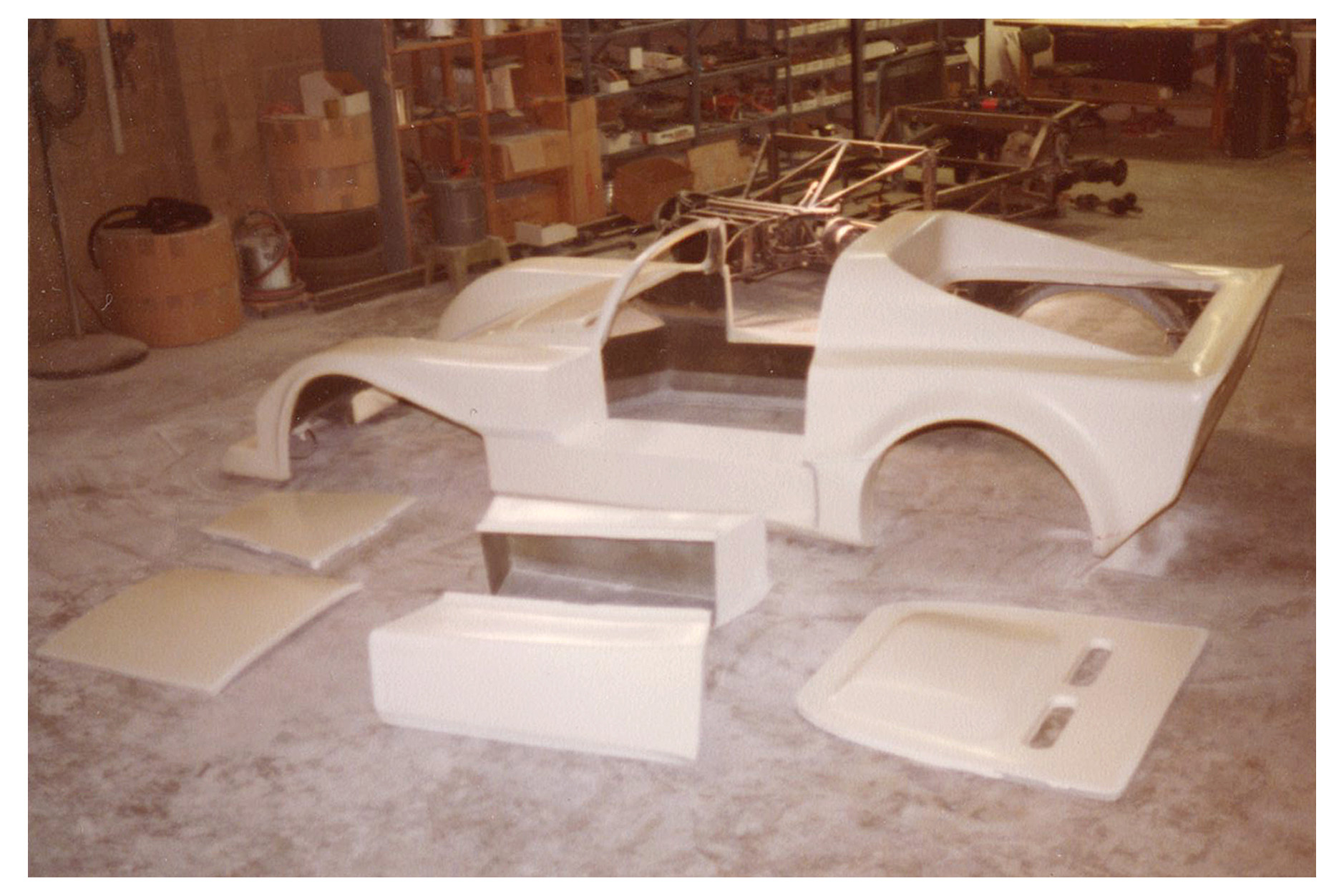
Willow main fiberglass body and some parts, right out of the molds, (16) body parts total, March 15, 1979, Chatsworth, CA.

== Publicity ==
The Willow was featured in articles in many auto magazines and publications including: The Complete Guide to Kit Cars; Hot Rod Magazine’s Kit Car Buyer Guide; Road & Track; Classic & Special Interest Cars; Motor Trend’s Sports Car Graphic; Beverly Hills People; Los Angeles Mazazine; Kit Car Monthly Newsletter; U.S. Dept. of Commerce Commercial News USA; Dune Buggies & Hot VW’s; Catalogo 81 Velocidad Annual; Kit Car Quarterly; Kit Car Encyclopedia; and many others.

In 1984 the Willow Kit Car business was sold to Mr. Fred Schrameck, S&S Race Group, Hayward, California.

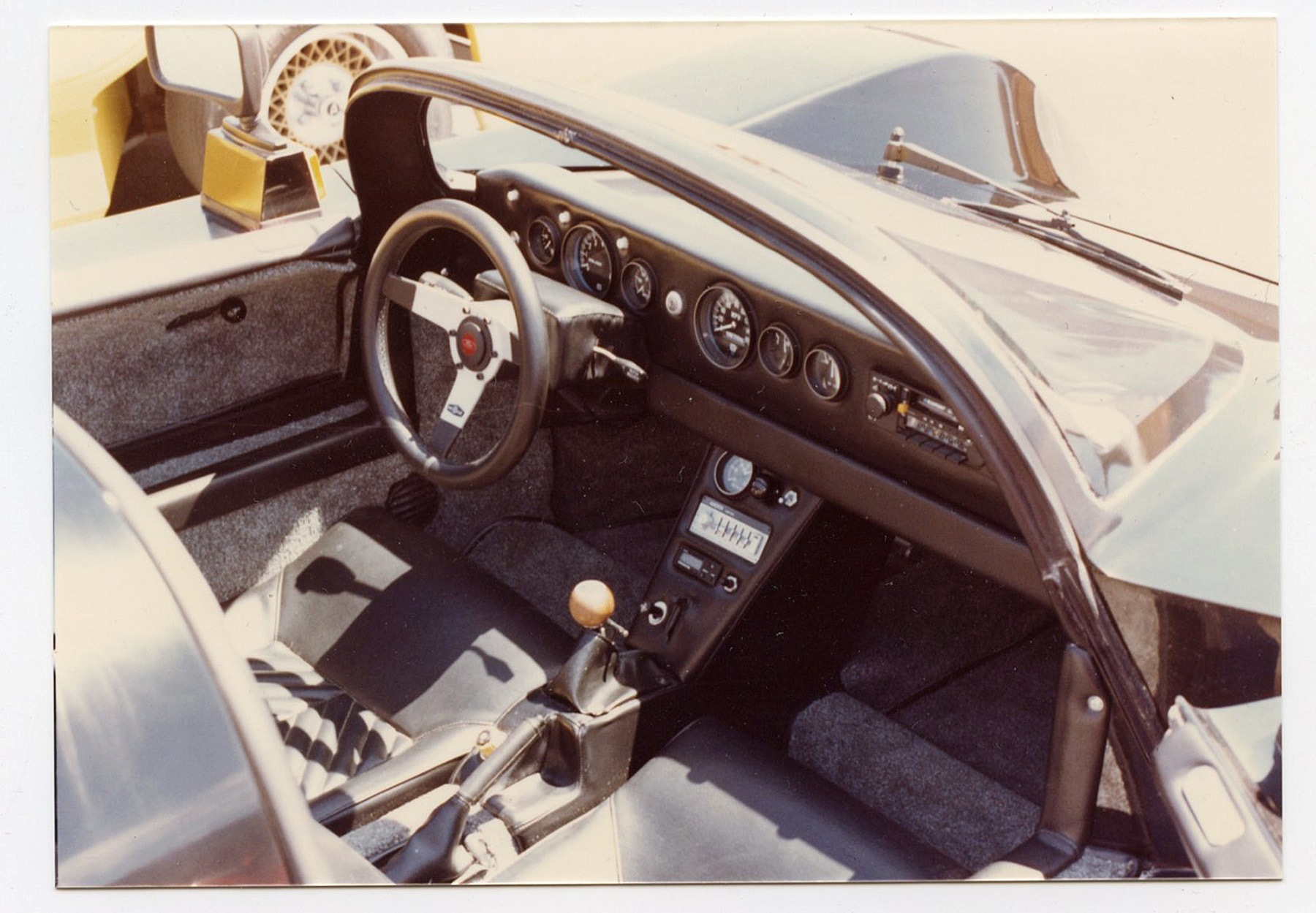
Willow dash and interior, May 12, 1980, Chatsworth, Calif.
