= 18th century in the United States =

Period in the United States

The 18th century in the United States refers to the period in the United States from 1701 through 1800 in the Gregorian calendar. For articles on this period, see:

- History of the United States series:
  - Colonial history of the United States
  - History of the United States (1776–1789)
  - History of the United States (1789–1849)
- Historical eras:
  - American Revolution
  - Confederation period
  - Federalist Era
