= Omega Training Group =

Omega Training
- Type: Small and medium enterprises
- Industry: Defense and e-Learning
- Founded: Columbus, Georgia, U.S. (1990)
- Headquarters: Columbus, Georgia, U.S.
- Key people: Glenn Marsh, Gen Manager Ray Kauffman, Vice-President Roger Hewitt, Vice-President
- Number of employees: 750+
- Website: www.omegatraining.com

Omega Training Group, Inc. was a company that provided analysis, training development, Interactive Multimedia Instruction (IMI), and integrated logistics support for defense-oriented programs. Omega provided products and services to United States Department of Defense agencies, the defense industry, and commercial clients.

Headquartered in Columbus, Georgia, United States, just north of the U.S. Army Infantry Center and School at Fort Benning, Omega employed approximately 750 employees in locations all over the United States.

On July 29, 2008 Cubic Corporation finalized the acquisition of Omega Training Group.

== News stories ==
- Hennessy, Mike. "Omega Training Group Raises the Bar". Archived from the original on 2008-08-28.
- "Air Force Award Notice".
- "Land Warrior: 2000s History".
- "USA: Omega Training Group Awarded Contract for Support". IPR Strategic Business Information Database. April 2005.
