= Natel Engineering =

- Industry: Electronics
- Founded: Simi Valley, CA (1975)
- Headquarters: Chatsworth, CA, USA
- Key people: Sudesh Arora, Founder and CEO
- Products: Electronic components for the medical, defense and telecommunications industries
- Website: www.natelems.com

Natel Engineering (also known by the moniker NATEL EMS) is a company that makes electronic components. Founded in 1975, the company originally made synchro converter components for airports and for antiaircraft missiles, and now produces components for the medical industry, and electronics for satellites, computer workstations and telecommunications equipment. The company is based in Chatsworth, CA.

== History ==
Natel Engineering Co. Inc. was founded in 1975 by Sudesh Arora. The company made electronic components for airports for the FAA and for Stinger antiaircraft missile systems, receiving a subcontract from defense contractor Raytheon in 1977. The company also produced synchro-to-binary decimal converters. When defense budgets began to decline in the late 1980s, the company began to produce components for heart pacemakers and implantable defibrillators, as well as electronics for space satellites, computer workstations and telecommunications equipment. This company did more work in this field than they had originally done in defense contracts by 1996.

In 1992, Natel acquired the microelectronics portion of Newbury Park company Semtech Corp. Then in 1993, Natel settled a legal investigation into its testing practices, paying $2.2 million to the government. In 1995, the company moved its headquarters from Simi Valley to Chatsworth. In 1999, Natel entered into an expanded agreement with Raytheon to make circuit types to build microelectronics for the F-15 and F/A-18 fighter jet radar, as well as Patriot, Sidewinder, Sparrow, Stinger and RAM missiles. In 2003, the company acquired the assets of Costa Mesa-based Scrantom Engineering Inc., which produced multilayer packages and substrates for microelectronic packaging. In 2004, Natel acquired assets from National Semiconductor's, as well as assets and intellectual property from CMC Wireless. In 2005, Natel entered into a merger purchase agreement with Hytek Microsystems, a manufacturer of microelectronic assemblies, with Hytek becoming a subsidiary of Natel. In 2005, Natel also acquired Thin Film Concepts in Elmsford, NY, expanding capabilities in CVD thin film technologies.

In 2013, the company acquired EPIC Technologies of Ohio from the Chicago-based private equity firm CIVC Partners for an undisclosed amount. At the time, Natel was the smaller of the two companies, with annual revenues of about $100 million, compared to EPIC's annual revenues of $200 million.

== People ==
Sudesh Arora is the founder and CEO of Natel. Laura Siegal has been the chief financial officer of Natel since July 2013. Chief operating officer James A. Angeloni joined Natel in 1982, has been vice president of manufacturing services since December 1995 and served as its head of technical support. Victor Yamauchi joined Natel in 2013 as its VP of Continuous Improvement. Dr. Prakash Bhartia [formerly Executive Vice President] serves as the company's first Engineering Fellow.

== Patents ==
Natel holds three patents for electronic components. One is for a DC or capacitively coupled bi-directional sync. Another is for the ornamental design of a Transformer magnetic core. The last is for a power converter.
