= McQ Inc. =

- Company type: Employee Owned
- Industry: Defense
- Founded: 1985
- Headquarters: Fredericksburg, Virginia, USA
- Key people: John McQuiddy, Founder; Brian McQuiddy, Chief Executive Officer
- Products: Defense
- Number of employees: 50
- Website: mcqinc.com

McQ Inc. is a defense and electronics company in Fredericksburg, Virginia, that specializes in remote monitoring and surveillance equipment and systems for government and industry. McQ Inc designed and produces the OmniSense unattended ground sensor system equipment in use as part of currently deployed Unattended Ground Sensors (UGS).

== History ==
McQ was founded in 1985 and began work mainly as contract support. In 1990 McQ began its transition to an electronics R&D company and has designed and produced many systems and products since. In 2010, McQ consolidated its production facilities into a new building on its Fredericksburg campus, expanding their manufacturing capabilities to meet demand.

In 2005, the Army Research Laboratory’s OmniSense system was commercialized and fielded by McQ Inc.

In 2006, McQ's OmniSense UGS system was selected as one of the Army's 10 greatest inventions for that year.
