= Gyrocam Systems =

Australian private equity fund

Gyrocam Systems, LLC
- Founded: 2003
- Headquarters: Sarasota, Florida, USA
- Website: http://www.gyrocamsystems.com/

Gyrocam Systems, LLC was part-owned and funded by a private equity fund that was located in Melbourne Australia. The company made the Gyrocam camera system, a gyro-stabilized camera system using multiple sub-cameras. Founded by Ken Sanborn, Peter Rudaizky and Edwin Daniels in 2003. Gyrocam Systems was based in Sarasota, Florida. Gyrocam also had facilities in Washington, D.C., and Afghanistan. Gyrocam marketed their systems as a technical solution to identify and classify objects of interest, including improvised explosive devices (IEDs) and enemy insurgent activity using stabilized, multi-spectral, optical sensor packages integrated on Mine Resistant Ambush Protected (MRAP) vehicles. Gyrocam continued to expand their presence in the land sensor market providing integrated solutions to the U.S. Army and U.S. Marine Corps. Gyrocam’s products also have airborne and maritime applications.

In August 2009, Gyrocam Systems, LLC was acquired by Lockheed Martin Corporation.

== History ==
Gyrocam Systems, LLC was founded in 2003 when Ken Sanborn partnered with Peter Rudaizky & Edwin Daniels to create a new company that focused on “high performance” gyro-stabilized electro-optic camera systems. The new ownership team pioneered the development of a telescopic mast-mounted, vehicle-based, mobile sensor application package utilizing their durable, highly stable camera system. Dan Kiehl joined them in the capacity of Senior Vice President in 2005. He was brought on board to employ six sigma, lean theory and overall operational excellence to the firm. His efforts resulted in the simplification of operations, compression of lead-times, and a employing companywide culture of total customer satisfaction. Gyrocam also focused on research and development efforts to improve and refine their stabilized camera system as well as developing and fielding a total integrated mission solution. The combined efforts of compressed lead-times, dedicated customer service and R&D efforts led to an immediate ISR requirement for military and law enforcement customers. Gryocam evolved into a full service defense contractor, with the onset of the program of record, which was called the “Vehicle Optical Sensor System” (VOSS)

President Bush visited Gyrocam Systems in the fall of 2006. He toured the manufacturing facility and met with some of the employees. He also participated in a live demonstration and operated one of the camera systems himself. President Bush expressed his enthusiasm about the company’s entrepreneurial spirit and its ability to bring employment to the area. The President also stated how important Gyrocam Systems ability to develop a solution that detects IED’s has impacted the safety of our American soldiers in the Middle East.

With the incidents of IED encounters on the rise, the first mast-mounted, vehicle-based military systems were deployed in early 2005 for the U.S. Army’s Hunter-Killer project; a program created by the Department of Defense as a U.S. Army effort with the objective of demonstrating current technological capabilities for an effective route clearance mission.

The company had provided hundreds of systems for the U.S. Army’s “VOSS” program along with fixed-site systems. Gyrocam Systems provided approximately 50 personnel to Iraq and Afghanistan for sustainment and training efforts to all branches of the U.S. military.

In 2009, Gyrocam Systems was awarded a modification under a previously awarded firm fixed-priced contract to exercise an option period for the procurement of Spare 360 Camera Systems for the MRAP vehicle. The MRAP vehicles are armored vehicles with blast resistant underbodies designed to protect the crew from mine blasts, fragmentary, and direct fire weapons. Shortly thereafter Gyrocam Systems sold the business to Lockheed Martin.

== Products ==
Gyrocam Systems has developed an extensive product line of camera systems that provide stabilized images from miles away, whether in air, on land, or at sea. Since 2004, Gyrocam Systems has fielded well in excess of 500 mast-mounted vehicle camera systems to the U.S. military in both Iraq and Afghanistan.
