= Dean Witter Reynolds Inc. v. Byrd =

Dean Witter Reynolds v. Byrd
- Supreme Court of the United States

Argued December 4, 1984 Decided March 4, 1985
- Full case name: Dean Witter Reynolds Inc. v. A. Lamar Byrd
- Docket no.: 83-1708
- Citations: 470 U.S. 213 (more) 105 S. Ct. 1238; 84 L. Ed. 2d 158

Case history
- Prior: Denial of motion to compel arbitration affirmed, 726 F.2d 552 (9th Cir. 1984); cert. granted, 467 U.S. 1240.
- Subsequent: Remanded to district court, 760 F.2d 238 (9th Cir. 1985).

Holding
- Intent of Congress in passing Federal Arbitration Act was to promote and permit arbitration; therefore, district courts must grant motion to compel arbitration of eligible pendent claims even when result would be possibly inefficient maintenance of separate proceedings in different forums. Ninth Circuit reversed and remanded.

Court membership
- Chief Justice Warren E. Burger Associate Justices William J. Brennan Jr. · Byron White; Thurgood Marshall · Harry Blackmun; Lewis F. Powell Jr. · William Rehnquist; John P. Stevens · Sandra Day O'Connor

Case opinions
- Majority: Marshall, joined by unanimous
- Concurrence: White

Laws applied
- Federal Arbitration Act, Securities Exchange Act of 1934

Dean Witter Reynolds Inc. v. Byrd, 470 U.S. 213 (1985), is a United States Supreme Court case concerning arbitration. It arose from an interlocutory appeal of a lower court's denial of brokerage firm Dean Witter Reynolds' motion to compel arbitration of the claims under state law made against it by an aggrieved former client. The Court held unanimously that the Federal Arbitration Act required that those claims be heard that way when the parties were contractually obligated to do so, even where parallel claims made under federal law would still be heard in federal court.

Justice Thurgood Marshall wrote for the court, resolving a conflict between the appellate circuits; Byron White added a concurrence in which he noted some issues with the underlying securities law that were not before the Court but, he felt, could in future cases make it harder for parties such as Byrd to claim that federal law always allowed them to litigate private actions for securities fraud. In the aftermath of the decision many district courts followed his opinion, leading to later Supreme Court rulings that greatly favored arbitration over litigation in securities disputes. It has been described as completing the federalization of American arbitration law.

== Underlying dispute ==
In 1981 A. Lamar Byrd, a dentist in Southern California, sold his practice and invested the $160,000 proceeds with Dean Witter Reynolds, a retail brokerage firm. Over the next several months his account lost more than half its value; he alleged that his broker represented to him that the account was profiting. Byrd claimed that the broker was using his account to churn, or making trades primarily to generate commissions for himself.

His client agreement with Dean Witter included a standard arbitration clause, by which the parties agreed to use that method to settle any disputes. However, it was limited by the Supreme Court's 1953 holding in Wilko v. Swan, another case in which an investor had sued a broker alleging fraud and the broker had responded with a motion to compel contractually mandated arbitration per the Federal Arbitration Act (FAA) passed in 1925. The plaintiff had sued under the Securities Act of 1933, under which any provision mandating that an investor waive their right to sue was prohibited. A 7–2 majority found the latter statute was controlling.

== Lower courts ==
Byrd sued Dean Witter in federal court, alleging violations of both the Securities Exchange Act of 1934 and applicable California law. During the pendency of the action, Justice William Brennan had suggested in Moses H. Cone Memorial Hospital v. Mercury Constr. Corp., where the petitioner sought to prevent the respondent it had already sued in state court from compelling arbitration through a federal action, that the FAA applied to proceedings in state courts as well, and that its enactment amounted to "a national policy favoring arbitration." Dean Witter moved to have Byrd's state-law claims arbitrated pending the outcome of the federal case, and was denied. It made an interlocutory appeal to the Ninth Circuit Court of Appeals.

A panel composed of circuit judges Alfred Goodwin and Thomas Tang and district judge Robert Aguilar heard the case late in 1983. They announced their decision early the next year. Unanimously, they affirmed the district court.

Writing for the panel, Goodwin reviewed the relevant law on securities cases that mixed arbitrable state claims with non-arbitrable federal one. Both courts within the Ninth Circuit, and other circuits, had considered similar arguments and decided them differently. The Sixth and Seventh circuits had stayed state claims for arbitration once the federal claim had been litigated. Others followed a doctrine called "intertwining", created in the 1981 Fifth Circuit case Miley v. Oppenheimer & Co., under which, if the district court found the circumstances underlying the federal and state claims were substantially similar, it had the discretion to deny arbitration in the interest of efficient dispute resolution.

Since the Ninth Circuit had not had to rule on the problem before, it was a question of first impression for the panel. Citing precedential holdings that a federal court has the sole jurisdiction to decide the essential issues to a federal securities claim, Goodwin felt that not permitting intertwining might frustrate both the goals of speedy dispute resolution, which he believed the FAA was intended to promote, and the preservation of access to the federal courts. "The 1925 Arbitration Act certainly did not anticipate the Supreme Court's 1953 determination that the protective intent of federal securities laws was to take priority over the economic advantages of arbitration," he wrote, concluding that the district court's denial of Dean Witter's motion was proper.

== Decision ==
Since the appellate court decision had created a conflict among the circuits, the Supreme Court granted certiorari later in 1984. It heard oral arguments in December. Eugene Bell, a cofounder of the Los Angeles firm Jones Bell, argued for Dean Witter, while Eric V. Benham argued for Byrd. Lawyers for the Securities Industry Association filed an amicus curiae brief urging reversal.

Four months after oral argument, the Court handed down its decision, which unanimously reversed the Ninth Circuit and held the stay to be properly granted. Justice Thurgood Marshall wrote for the court, and Byron White added a concurrence. It was remanded to the Ninth Circuit, which in turn remanded it to the trial court.

=== Opinion of the Court ===
After reviewing the facts of the case, and the contrasting responses of the circuits, Marshall explained the justices' reasoning. He admitted that the legislative history of the FAA did not offer any guidance as to how a court might handle a case with both arbitrable and non-arbitrable claims, much less suggest that they had even considered the problem. But it was very clear that while Congress and its drafters had expressed some concern about the effect of delays in dispute resolution, "the purpose behind its passage was to ensure judicial enforcement of privately made agreements to arbitrate."

Thus the Court did not see the need for any balancing test pitting arbitration against efficient dispute resolution. "The preeminent concern of Congress in passing the Act was to enforce private agreements into which parties had entered," wrote Marshall, "and that concern requires that we rigorously enforce agreements to arbitrate, even if the result is 'piecemeal' litigation ... By compelling arbitration of state-law claims, a district court successfully protects the contractual rights of the parties and their rights under the Arbitration Act." In Moses Cone the year before, he noted, the Court had chosen to bifurcate a proceeding between federal and state courts, however inefficient that was, in order to uphold the FAA.

Lastly, Marshall addressed a concern that the Ninth Circuit had not discussed, but was part of the Fifth Circuit's justification for Miley.

It is also suggested ... that district courts should decide arbitrable pendent claims when a nonarbitrable federal claim is before them, because otherwise the findings in the arbitration proceeding might have collateral-estoppel effect in a subsequent federal proceeding. This preclusive effect is believed to pose a threat to the federal interest in resolution of securities claims, and to warrant a refusal to compel arbitration.

The Court did not believe this was a serious problem. Again Marshall returned to a case from the preceding term: McDonald v. West Branch. There another unanimous Court had held that since arbitration was not a judicial proceeding, federal courts were not bound by arbitrators' findings. Since the question was not currently before the Court, Marshall merely advised that "in framing preclusion rules in this context, courts shall take into account the federal interests warranting protection."

=== White concurrence ===
Justice Byron White wrote a concurring opinion raising a question that, he agreed with Marshall, was not before the Court in this particular case but was ancillary to it. Indeed, he noted, it had been raised in another case a decade earlier, where it was also not before the Court. Specifically, he questioned whether the federal claims were indeed not arbitrable.

The claim that they were arbitrable rested on Wilko v. Swan, which had held that three provisions of the Securities Act of 1933, including one with specific language to that effect, barred the mandatory arbitration of private securities-fraud claims. But White distinguished Byrd's case as having been filed under the Securities Exchange Act of 1934, and argued that "Wilko's reasoning cannot be mechanically transferred to the 1934 Act."

Only one of the three, the non-waiver provision, was identical in both statutes. Furthermore, the 1934 Act limited jurisdiction to federal courts and allowed for only an implied cause of action rather than an express one, resulting in a higher burden of proof for a plaintiff making allegations under the same sections as Byrd. Therefore, the 1934 Act's non-waiver language was inapplicable since it explicitly referred to "any provision of this chapter" and could not thus cover the 1933 Act as well.

White reminded his colleagues that the Court had acknowledged this in its 1974 majority opinion in Scherk v. Alberto-Culver Co.. In that case, the respondent, an Illinois company seeking to recover from petitioner, a German citizen it alleged to have misrepresented the status of trademarks it sold, appealed an order to arbitrate before a panel in Paris. Since the transaction had also involved a stock purchase, Alberto-Culver argued that the 1933 Act and Wilko controlled and the case could not be arbitrated.

Since Alberto-Culver had, like Byrd, made their claim under the 1934 Act, Justice Potter Stewart had made the same point that the two statutes were not identical, but accepted it for argument's sake to hold that it was irrelevant since arbitration was desirable in that case due to the international nature of the dispute. In a dissent that both White and Marshall signed, William O. Douglas countered that the 1934 Act was remedial legislation which the Court had, as such, previously held was to be construed broadly. Further, against Stewart's semantic criticisms, Douglas had reiterated Wilko's misgivings about the shortcomings of arbitration, such as a lack of discovery or appellate review and the possibility that an arbitrator would have a poor understanding of the relevant law. White did not take either side in his concurrence, but reminded his colleagues that the question had not been resolved.

== Subsequent jurisprudence ==
White's concurrence had the most immediate effect of any aspect of the decision. Many district courts began pointing to it to require litigants who had filed claims under the 1934 Act to arbitrate them, regardless of precedent in their circuits. Some declined to, noting that the Court had not considered the question and that Wilko still governed. This created another conflict in the circuits that the Court had to resolve.

=== Shearson/American Express v. McMahon ===
It took a year from Byrd for one of the circuits to consider one of these cases. In McMahon v. Shearson/American Express, the Second Circuit followed the Supreme Court in ordering state-law claims arbitrated and the federal ones litigated. It believed that public policy and precedent were on the side of resolving the latter judicially. "Although Scherk and Byrd may cast some doubt on whether the Supreme Court, if presented with the issue, would hold [such] claims ... to be non-arbitrable," wrote William Homer Timbers, "it would be improvident for us to disregard clear judicial precedent in this Circuit based on mere speculation."

Four other circuits accepted this. In Conover v. Dean Witter Reynolds, the Ninth Circuit examined White's critique at length. Judge Mary M. Schroeder looked beyond the text of the statutes to the accompanying legislative history. When Congress had overhauled the 1934 Act in 1975, the conference committee report had contained statements referring to Wilko and making it clear that the conferees did not intend to require arbitration. She reiterated the concern that arbitration did not fully safeguard the rights of an unsophisticated investor, and noted that the right to sue was so well established by case law that an implied cause of action was not necessary.

The First and Eighth circuits, on the other hand, sided with Stewart and White in holding that Wilko did not cover claims under the 1934 Act. This created another conflict in the circuits. The Supreme Court decided to resolve it later in the year when it heard McMahon on appeal from the Second Circuit, and decided it in early 1987.

Justice Sandra Day O'Connor wrote for a 5–4 majority that Wilko did not cover claims under the 1934 Act, since that Court had expressed doubts about the ability of arbitration to protect a claimants' rights under the 1933 Act that the present court had recently indicated it no longer shared. The nonwaiver provision of the 1934 Act applied only to its substantive provisions. She was unpersuaded that the adhesive nature of most brokerage contracts required greater protection for investors, and noted that most of the reservations the Wilko Court expressed had been rejected by later holdings on arbitration. The later amendments, she wrote, had not addressed the issue and been meant to enhance the self-regulatory powers of the stock exchanges and organizations like the National Association of Securities Dealers. "The suitability of arbitration as a means of enforcing Exchange Act rights is evident from our decision in Scherk", O'Connor said.

Harry Blackmun wrote a dissent signed by Brennan and Marshall. He argued that the majority had read Wilko too narrowly and understated the significance of the 1975 reforms. While allowing that arbitration was not as problematic as it had been, he still felt there were valid concerns. "It is thus ironic that the Court's decision, no doubt animated by its desire to rid the federal courts of these suits, actually may increase litigation about arbitration." John Paul Stevens added one of his own expressing surprise that the Court would so casually overturn what had been settled law in all the circuits for the past three decades.

Orders to compel arbitration in securities-fraud cases increased in the wake of McMahon, beyond the decision's clarifying effect. In mixed-claim cases like it and Byrd, some lower courts began requiring all claims to be arbitrated in the interest of efficient dispute resolution. Others even began applying it to the 1933 Act, forcing another Supreme Court case in 1989, Rodriguez de Quijas v. Shearson/American Express Inc., which finally overturned Wilko.

== Analysis and commentary ==
In the wake of the case, commentators focused on the impact it would have on securities arbitration. "Unless arbitration procedures are fair both in fact and in appearance," warned Constatine Katsoris, a Fordham law professor and securities arbitrator, "their present popularity as a means of resolving securities disputes will be greatly diminished". In particular he was concerned about backlash resulting from the standard form contracts most brokerages signed their clients to, calling on them to make arbitration voluntary. He also recommended that the arbitration forums run by NASD and the exchanges, traditionally formed of securities-industry professionals, to include members of the public both on panels and in their administration.

If that requires some adjustments by the securities industry—so be it. The price will be small enough in view of the advantages of arbitration to the industry. The public's perception of fairness, however, must be zealously guarded, for it extends far beyond the issue of arbitration. It goes to the very heart of the public's trust in the securities markets themselves; and, this trust must be preserved for those markets to stay healthy.

Michael Durrer, a law student at William & Mary, echoed Katsoris, adding suggestions to amend the 1934 Act to allow for an express private right of action and for NASD and the exchanges to establish an amount in controversy threshold, an upper limit on arbitrable claims.

Other commentators have given the decision a key place in the Court's arbitration jurisprudence. Linda Hirschman of Chicago–Kent College of Law calls Byrd the final case in the "Second Arbitration Trilogy", in homage to the "Steelworkers Trilogy" of cases from 1960 involving labor arbitration. It completed the federalization of arbitration law, begun in Moses Cone when Brennan's majority opinion suggested the FAA applied to proceedings in state court, a position formalized a year later in Southland Corp. v. Keating. In the securities context, Lynn Katzler of American University's Washington College of Law later described Byrd as continuing "[t]he slow destruction of the Wilko doctrine" that began with Scherk and culminated in Rodriguez de Quijas.

== See also ==
- List of United States Supreme Court cases by the Burger Court
