= Wilko v. Swan =

- Supreme Court of the United States

Argued October 21, 1953 Decided December 7, 1953
- Full case name: Anthony Wilko v. Joseph E. Swan, et al., individually and doing business under the firm name and style of Hayden, Stone & Co., Defendants and Third-Party Plaintiffs, and Haven B. Page, Defendant (James A. McCabe, Third-Party Defendant).
- Docket no.: 53-39
- Citations: 346 U.S. 427 (more) 74 S. Ct. 182; 98 L. Ed. 168

Case history
- Prior: Stay pending arbitration denied, 107 F. Supp. 75 (S.D.N.Y. 1952); rev'd, 201 F.2d 439 (2nd Cir. 1953); cert. granted, 345 U.S. 969 (1953).
- Subsequent: retrial ordered, 127 F. Supp. 55 (S.D.N.Y. 1955)

Holding
- Federal Arbitration Act does not supersede provisions of Securities Act of 1933 forbidding waiver of right to litigate fraud claims where contract between broker and investor had binding predispute arbitration clause; arbitration does not provide equivalent legal and procedural protections as judicial forum. Second Circuit reversed.

Court membership
- Chief Justice Earl Warren Associate Justices Hugo Black · Stanley F. Reed; Felix Frankfurter · William O. Douglas; Robert H. Jackson · Harold H. Burton; Tom C. Clark · Sherman Minton

Case opinions
- Majority: Reed
- Concurrence: Jackson
- Dissent: Frankfurter, joined by Minton

Laws applied
- Federal Arbitration Act, Securities Act of 1933
- Overruled by
- Rodriguez de Quijas v. Shearson/American Express Inc., 490 U.S. 477 (1989)

Wilko v. Swan, 346 U.S. 427 (1953), is a United States Supreme Court decision on the arbitration of securities fraud claims. It had originally been brought by an investor who claimed his broker at Hayden Stone had sold stock to him without disclosing that he and the firm were the primary sellers. By a 7–2 margin the Court held that the provisions of the Securities Act of 1933 barring any waiver of rights under that statute took precedence over the Federal Arbitration Act's (FAA) requirement that arbitration clauses in contracts be given full effect by federal courts. It reversed a decision to the contrary by a divided panel of the Second Circuit Court of Appeals.

Justice Stanley Forman Reed wrote the majority opinion that relied on the explicit wording in the Securities Act and expressed doubt as to whether arbitration could truly protect the rights of investors. Robert H. Jackson wrote a short concurrence distancing himself slightly from that latter opinion. Felix Frankfurter dissented, taking issue with the majority's hostility to arbitration.

Later the logic of the decision was extended by an appeals court to cover claims made under the Securities Exchange Act of 1934. The Supreme Court itself later expressed doubt as to the legal soundness of that holding, and in the 1985 case Shearson/American Express Inc. v. McMahon expressly held that it did not. This led lower courts to begin to overrule Wilko as well, and in 1989 the Court itself did so in Rodriguez de Quijas v. Shearson/American Express Inc., part of a series of decisions in the 1980s and ever since that greatly expanded the use of arbitration in dispute resolution.

Although the decision was overruled, one aspect of it survived Rodriguez de Quijas: Reed's dictum that "manifest disregard" for the law would be enough to justify a court's overturning an arbitral award. Later courts and commentators have puzzled over what that meant and whether it arose from the text of the FAA or independently. The Court itself would face that question in the 2008 Hall Street Associates, L.L.C. v. Mattel, Inc., although without resolving it to much satisfaction.

== Underlying dispute ==
The plaintiff, Anthony Wilko, alleged that he had been the victim of a pump and dump scheme perpetrated by his broker and a corporate executive. Early in 1951 he bought 1,600 shares of common stock in Air Associates, Inc., a New Jersey company, for $29,517.54 ($366,131 in contemporary dollars). He claimed to have done so because his stockbroker at Hayden Stone, Joseph Swan, had represented to him that Air was about to conclude a merger with Borg Warner, which would likely lead to the price increasing by as much as $6 over what it was then trading at when the merger was announced. Swan did not tell Wilko that Haven Page, counsel for Air Associates and a director of that company, was selling a large holding of his, including some of the stock Wilko purchased.

No merger ever happened, and the stock did not appreciate as Swan had predicted. Left holding the bag, Wilko sold the shares at a loss two weeks later. He filed suit in federal court for the Southern District of New York under the Securities Act of 1933 (commonly known in securities law as the 1933 Act), which regulates transactions in the primary market, alleging securities fraud and seeking $3,888 ($48,226 in contemporary dollars) in damages.

Instead of responding to his complaint, Hayden Stone sought a stay pending the outcome of arbitration, per a clause in Wilko's customer agreement mandating that both parties use that method of dispute resolution. They cited another statute, the Federal Arbitration Act (FAA), which required that courts grant stays for arbitration as long as the dispute was covered by the parties' contractual agreement and the contract was valid. In response, Wilko cited language in the 1933 Act barring any such contractual waiver of an investor's right to take such claims to court.

== Lower courts ==
The motion to stay was denied in district court, but upheld by a divided panel of the Second Circuit Court of Appeals. At all stages of the case the Securities and Exchange Commission (SEC) was granted permission to take an active role in the proceedings as an amicus curiae on Wilko's side.

=== District court ===
Judge Henry W. Goddard heard the case. In 1952 he ruled on the defense motion to stay, holding that the 1933 Act's anti-waiver provision rendered the matter beyond the scope of the arbitration clause. "It is very clear that the intent of the Congress was to require that the provisions of the Securities Act should be strictly complied with so that the purchaser of securities would be protected as fully as reasonably possible," he wrote, referencing the statute's legislative history. "A collateral agreement of this nature would nullify the Act's basic purposes and allow the purposes of the Congress to be circumvented."

Goddard did not believe arbitration offered the same protections as the 1933 Act. While the Second Circuit, which had appellate jurisdiction over the Southern District, had been supportive of arbitration between companies in the past, it had also recognized its limitations. However, this was not one of those cases. "Congress in its concern for the investor's protection and the restoration of public confidence in the industry, must have been aware of the lesser bargaining position of the purchaser of securities," he wrote. "By ... barring waiver of rights it plainly meant to prevent an advantage gained from an assertion of a superior bargaining power." The defendants had pointed to arbitration allowed under the Fair Labor Standards Act (FLSA) and the Miller Act, but he distinguished those cases from the one before him by noting that the FLSA did not have the same anti-waiver provisions, nor had they concerned themselves with statutory conflicts.

=== Appeals court ===
The defendants filed an interlocutory appeal to the Second Circuit, which heard oral arguments in the case near the end of the year. Chief Judge Thomas Walter Swan (no relation to defendant) was joined on the panel by Harrie Brigham Chase and Charles Edward Clark. They handed down their split decision early the following year. Swan and Chase had agreed, overturning the district court and holding the arbitration clause enforceable. Clark agreed with Goddard that the underlying policy considerations precluded that outcome, and did not require the specificity the majority demanded.

==== Majority opinion ====
"The appeal presents an interesting question of statutory construction said to be of first impression", Swan began. There was no question of the contract's validity, since there had been no argument to that effect. "[W]e must assume that the plaintiff voluntarily entered into the agreement and fully understood its terms." So he turned to the document itself.

While one paragraph, exempting the firm from liability for any harm caused by the representation or advice of its agents, could be seen as violating the anti-waiver provision, that did not invalidate the entire agreement due to the severability provisions elsewhere in the contract. Nor did the anti-waiver provision itself contain language that invalidated entire contracts that violated its terms, only "[a]ny condition, stipulation, or provision" of an agreement that did. "The stipulation to arbitrate is not one waiving compliance with the statute unless the statute be construed to forbid arbitration," Swan wrote, "a construction believed to be untenable for reasons hereafter stated."

First, the contract specified that it was governed by the 1934 Act and any future amendments to it. While that could be read to suggest that any controversies under the 1933 Act were outside the contract and thus inarbitrable, "we do not think the principle of expressio unius est exclusio alterius is here applicable," Swan wrote. It was possible that the 1934 Act could be read as including the 1933 Act, but that was immaterial since the sale of the Air stock to Wilko necessarily came under the 1933 Act as a primary-market transaction.

Swan then turned to the question of whether the statute reflected a public-policy goal of Congress. There was no such declaration to that effect in its text, and in 1941 the Supreme Court had itself said that "[t]he essential purpose of the statute is to protect investors by requiring publication of certain information concerning securities before offered for sale." It thus provided the buyer with a private cause of action, the choice to sue in any state or federal court and put the burden of proof on the seller if the buyer argued the purchase was fraudulently induced.

Swan considered whether each of these provisions could be read as excluding the possibility of arbitrating a claim. As the FLSA and Miller Act cases cited by the district court had held, a statutory cause of action could not be held inarbitrable on that basis. The SEC's amicus brief had not even held that, he noted. "[I]f the parties may agree to arbitrate after the action has been brought, we can conceive of no sound reason why they may not agree in advance, provided no fraud or coercion was practised upon the buyer in securing his consent to the arbitration agreement."

Nor did the choice-of-venue provision preclude arbitration, Swan found.

[C]ertainly this is not a direction that he must sue to enforce the right created by [the 1933 Act]. It can hardly be doubted that he could voluntarily settle his claim without bringing suit. If so, why may he not agree to settle it by arbitration? ... A stipulation to arbitrate cannot be a "provision binding any person acquiring any security to waive compliance with any provision of this title," unless the purchaser is obligated to sue.

"The burden of proof provision," Swan wrote, "supplies the best basis for argument against recognizing an agreement to arbitrate in an action of this nature." No guarantee existed that arbitrators would apply such a provision properly. Swan agreed but noted that the court had already declared the liability release invalid, so the arbitrators would not be considering it. And "while it may be true that arbitrators do not ordinarily consider themselves bound to decide strictly according to legal rules, there can be no doubt that they are so bound if the arbitration agreement so provides." A court could always review the arbitrators' decision when it came time to enforce the award, he added.

"The Arbitration Act evidences a congressional policy to favor arbitration," Swan concluded, citing circuit precedent calling on judges to change their attitude to the procedure. "The purpose of the Securities Act of 1933 is to protect investors." He admitted that Goddard had made a strong argument to the contrary but did not find his public policy arguments sufficient. "If Congress had intended to forbid arbitration in a suit based on [the 1933 Act], we believe it would have expressed such intent."

==== Dissent ====
Judge Clark, for his part, found Goddard's argument "very convincing":

Commercial arbitration has been highly successful in bringing a businessman's adjudication to business questions. But it would be vastly unfortunate if it became usable as a device to blunt or break social legislation. Here the intent of the contracting party having the superior bargaining power is not concealed. The seventeen finely printed paragraphs of obligation and waiver, covering six pages of the printed record, imposed by this brokerage firm upon customers are designed to secure just as much exculpation as can be devised, contrary to the spirit and the letter of the Securities Act of 1933.

Arbitrators, Clark felt, would have natural conflicts since they were often drawn from the business community where the disputes arose. "[This] is surely not a way of assuring the customer that objective and sympathetic consideration of his claim which is envisaged by the Securities Act," he observed.

The very nature of arbitration, Clark argued, ran counter to the intent of the statute. "[T]he great purpose of arbitration is to get away from ordinary legal restrictions as to evidence and proof, and substitute the informed knowledge of the tribunal for the imperfect knowledge of technical matters acquired through ordinary court processes," he wrote. But that latter factor made all the difference to judicial proceedings, and if it was imposed on arbitration as well, "the chief reason for [it] is gone if the arbitrators are to act only like lawyers and judges."

Clark also doubted that arbitration could deliver on its promise of speedy dispute resolution. Even if it did, "it must necessarily be succeeded by lengthy judicial proceedings before the award is legally enforceable." The majority was mistaken, he claimed, in assuming that if Congress had wanted to exempt 1933 Act claims from arbitration it would have included a provision to that effect:

I submit that such a course would have been neither a usual nor a safe and proper method of draftsmanship. Here was intended a broad and general prohibition of limiting contracts. Had particular devices of restriction then been individually considered, it would nevertheless have been unwise to single them out for separate reference. For that would have suggested that other unrecalled devices were permissible. The language chosen is broad and general, as befits the intent. It seems to me wholly adequate and effective to safeguard the investor against loss of his right of suit under the Act and the important burden of proof which it grants in his favor.

Arbitration chosen by both parties after a dispute had developed was permissible, Clark agreed, citing cases where courts had approved it under the Federal Employers Liability Act (FELA). "Because I believe important rights under this notable first of a series of famous Acts for the benefit of the investing public should not be capable of nullification by long fineprint restrictions of the broker's devising," he concluded, "I think the ruling below wise and beneficent."

== Supreme Court ==
Wilko petitioned the Supreme Court for certiorari; it was granted later that year. The Court heard arguments in October, shortly after Earl Warren began his tenure as Chief Justice. William H. Timbers, later to serve on the Second Circuit himself, argued for the SEC as amicus. The Court handed down its decision two months later.

By a 7–2 margin it found for Wilko, holding that the 1933 Act's anti-waiver provisions took precedence over the FAA. Stanley Forman Reed wrote for a majority that shared Goddard and Chase's reservations about the ability of arbitration to protect an investor's statutory rights; Robert H. Jackson's wrote a short concurrence. In dissent, Felix Frankfurter, joined by Sherman Minton, defended arbitration.

=== Majority and concurrence ===
After reviewing the facts of the case, its history and the parties' arguments, Reed began his analysis. "[W]e think the right to select the judicial forum is the kind of 'provision' that cannot be waived under [the 1933 Act]," he wrote.

[I]t is clear that the Securities Act was drafted with an eye to the disadvantages under which buyers labor. Issuers of and dealers in securities have better opportunities to investigate and appraise the prospective earnings and business plans affecting securities than buyers. It is therefore reasonable for Congress to put buyers of securities covered by that Act on a different basis from other purchasers.

Buyers who arbitrated claims waived the special provisions enacted on their behalf. Even though their claims would still be arbitrated under the 1933 Act, they would have no guarantee that arbitrators would understand it, and in the absence of a written opinion from the arbitrator no basis for judicial review of the award. "[I]t seems to us that Congress must have intended [the anti-waiver provision] to apply to waiver of judicial trial and review," Reed concluded. He explained:

While it may be true, as the Court of Appeals thought, that a failure of the arbitrators to decide in accordance with the provisions of the Securities Act would "constitute grounds for vacating the award pursuant to section 10 of the Federal Arbitration Act," that failure would need to be made clearly to appear. In unrestricted submission, such as the present margin agreements envisage, the interpretations of the law by the arbitrators in contrast to manifest disregard are not subject, in the federal courts, to judicial review for error in interpretation.

Reed likened the case to Boyd v. Grand Trunk Western Railroad Co., where the Court had held that a contractual limitation on choice of venue for lawsuits conflicted with an anti-waiver provision in the FELA. There was, he admitted, no requirement to sue as the appeals court had noted. But "a waiver in advance of a controversy stands upon a different footing."

"Two policies, not easily reconcilable, are involved in this case," Reed began his conclusion. While there were admittedly advantages to arbitration, it was better not to compel it in this case. "the intention of Congress concerning the sale of securities is better carried out by holding invalid such an agreement for arbitration of issues arising under the Act." Jackson's short concurrence agreed with the majority and its reasoning, but was less certain that there would be no prospect of judicial review of the award under the FAA.

=== Dissent ===
"There is nothing in the record before us," Frankfurter wrote, "nor in the facts of which we can take judicial notice, to indicate that the arbitral system as practiced in the City of New York, and as enforceable under the supervisory authority of the District Court for the Southern District of New York, would not afford the plaintiff the rights to which he is entitled." In the absence of Wilko having demonstrated, much less introduced evidence to suggest, that arbitration would not fully protect those rights, he believed the Court should have enforced the arbitration clause. The majority was wrong to suggest that judicial review of the award was not likely.

Wilko, said Frankfurter, had not been coerced into accepting the arbitration clause, as far as he could see. "It is one thing to make out a case of overreaching as between parties bargaining not at arm's length," he wrote. "It is quite a different thing to find in the anti-waiver provision of the Securities Act a general limitation on the Federal Arbitration Act."

== Subsequent proceedings ==
The case was remanded to district court, where Judge Alexander Bicks presided over a trial. Bicks broke the case down into seven questions for the jury to answer. They were able to answer three but not the other four. In 1955, Bicks ruled on the issue himself in denying the defense motion for dismissal of several charges or a directed verdict and ordering a new trial.

Wilko v. Swan
- Court: United States District Court for the Southern District of New York
- Full case name: Anthony Wilko, Plaintiff v. Joseph E. Swan et al., individually and doing business under the firm name and style of Hayden, Stone & Co., Defendants and Third-Party Plaintiffs, and Haven B. Page, Defendant (James A. McCabe, Third-Party Defendant).
- Decided: January 11, 1955
- Citation: 127 F.Supp. 55

Case history
- Prior actions: 107 F. Supp. 75 (S.D.N.Y., 1952); rev'd, 201 F. 2d 439 (2nd Cir., 1953); certiorari granted, 345 U.S. 969 (1953); rev'd, 346 U.S. 427

Holding
- Securities Act of 1933 applies to all sellers of securities in primary market; posture of seller is irrelevant to deciding fraud claim. Summary judgement denied and retrial ordered.

Court membership
- Judge sitting: Alexander Bicks

At the time of the stock sales, there had been no registration statement in effect. Wilko had been permitted to add this as another cause of action at trial. The jury found that Haven Page, the Air Associates executive who had sold the shares through Hayden Stone, did not indirectly or directly control the company. This created the question of whether his sale of the shares was a distribution under the 1933 Act.

The defendants argued that the 1933 Act was not applicable to sellers. "This contention," Bicks responded, "reflects a failure to distinguish between the provisions of the Act requiring registration and those imposing liability for fraud." The defendants tried to argue that whether a transaction was a sale under the act depended on whether the person offering the securities were issuers, underwriters, dealers or traders.

Such a construction would frustrate the remedial purposes of the statute and lead to absurd and wholly incongruous results. The rights of a purchaser of securities publicly offered for sale would depend not upon whether fraud in fact was practised but upon the status of the vendor. Fraudulent seller would be placed in two categories: one encompassing those engaged in the distribution of securities; the other, those engaged in trading transactions. Purchasers from sellers of the first category would have the protection and the benefits of the Act while purchasers from sellers of the latter category would not. Nothing in the Act reflects a more tender regard for the dishonest trader, nor a purpose to protect only purchasers defrauded by sellers other than traders.

Since previous courts had interpreted the statute broadly enough to include brokers processing sell orders as sales, "[a] construction of the terms 'sell' or 'sale' which would exclude a sale by a trader on a national securities exchange would insert an exception where none appears in the Act and would operate to restrict said terms in derogation of the objectives of the Act," wrote Bicks. Nor did it matter that other remedies were available under contract law or the 1934 Act; the buyer had the freedom to choose whichever remedy he wished.

== Subsequent jurisprudence ==
Cases considering and reconsidering Wilko have followed two lines. Earlier ones considered its applicability to the 1934 Act, culminating in Rodriguez de Quijas v. Shearson/American Express Inc., the 1989 case that overruled it. Since then, as that and other decisions expanded the use of arbitration to resolve disputes, courts have considered how, exactly, an arbitrator might be found to have expressed "manifest disregard" for the law.

=== Applicability to 1934 Act ===
The 1933 Act regulates the primary market in securities, where purchasers buy directly from the issuing entities. Most trading in securities, however, takes place in the secondary market, where investors buy from each other, regulated by the 1934 Act. Since Wilko only concerned itself with the former statute, the question of whether securities claims under the latter were also inarbitrable was still open.

In 1961, the Southern District of New York became the first court to consider that question in Reader v. Hirsch & Co.. Judge Archie Owen Dawson held that the similar anti-waiver provision in the 1934 Act likewise barred predispute arbitration agreements. "[E]ven if the substantive portions of the Acts of 1933 and 1934 were more dissimilar, still Wilko would be quite persuasive in determining the instant application," he wrote, since in his reading that case's decisive factor was the forum-selection provision rather than the anti-waiver language. He recognized that, since the 1934 Act only had an implied cause of action rather than the one explicitly provided for in the 1933 Act, it could be argued that the 1934 Act's anti-waiver provisions could be read differently. But an earlier case had already rejected that argument when it was used to seek an outright dismissal. In 1970 the Second Circuit tacitly approved Reader in its own Greater Continental Corp. v. Schecter.

==== Scherk v. Alberto-Culver Co. ====
Around that time, the dispute eventually heard by the Supreme Court as Scherk v. Alberto-Culver Co., the first case to consider Wilko and its applicability to the 1934 Act, was beginning. Alberto-Culver, the Illinois-based manufacturer of personal care products, filed suit in the Northern District of Illinois after finding that the German trademarks Fritz Scherk had sold them were seriously encumbered. They refused Scherk's demand to arbitrate the claim before the International Chamber of Commerce in Paris per the contract, claiming fraud in the inducement as well as a waiver of their American statutory rights. After the district court denied Scherk's motion for a stay to do so the Seventh Circuit heard his interlocutory appeal. Since the transaction had also involved a transfer of stock, Alberto-Culver further argued that Wilko barred them from being forced to arbitrate.

Scherk argued that Wilko was inapplicable. He relied on The Bremen v. Zapata Off-Shore Co., a case from the previous year in which the Supreme Court had held valid a forum selection clause requiring the dispute to be adjudicated in an English court. Further, as a foreign national, he argued that the district court lacked personal jurisdiction over him.

The panel divided. Myron L. Gordon, a Wisconsin district judge sitting by designation, distinguished Wilko from The Bremen by noting that the latter case did not involve a transfer of securities. Scherk also had sufficient contacts in the United States to give the court jurisdiction. Gordon therefore held for himself and Indiana district judge Robert A. Grant that Wilko barred Scherk from forcing arbitration.

"The relevant statutory language has not changed materially and it is not easy to identify a principled basis for distinguishing that case from this," John Paul Stevens, later elevated to the Supreme Court himself, wrote about Wilko in his dissent. "Nevertheless, since I am persuaded that Congress did not intend the Exchange Act of 1934 to hamper the ability of American firms to acquire foreign businesses, I believe this arbitration clause should be enforced."

Stevens observed that the 1934 Act had been extended to cover many activities beyond those originally envisioned, especially as American companies began doing more and more business overseas. Since larger transactions, even domestically, often required "an independent audit or other verification of the property being purchased or sold," the protections of the Act were less essential.

To the extent that reliance on statutory protection plays a relatively less significant part in the investment decision, there is a correspondingly lesser justification for a prohibition against any waiver of the benefits of the Act. Moreover, in transactions which are sufficiently large and complex that the parties typically contemplate the possibility of future controversy, the method of resolving foreseeable disputes is itself a proper subject of bargaining. In the international market, the inability to agree on a neutral forum quite clearly may affect the price of the transaction, or even the acceptability of a prospective purchaser. The reason for the rule of Wilko v. Swan simply does not fit this case.

Stevens argued that the 1934 Act could permit arbitration. "[I]t is not easy to give the two provisions different interpretations," due to their similarities, he admitted. But Wilko and the practices of statutory interpretation allowed for some flexibility. "What is waived—if the arbitration agreement is enforced—is plaintiff's right to sue rather than defendant's obligation to comply with the Act."

That reading was not, Stevens admitted, consistent with how the Wilko Court had read the 1933 Act. But, he continued, that case had relied as much on public policy arguments as the text of the statutes.

The text of the 1933 Act, like the text of the 1934 Act, renders void any waiver by a plaintiff of defendant's obligation to comply with the statute. Neither text expressly applies to the plaintiff's waiver of his right to sue in a federal court. Moreover, the rule of Wilko v. Swan does not entirely prohibit the plaintiff's waiver of that right; the case merely decided when plaintiff may not waive a right — namely, before the dispute under the 1933 Act has arisen. Thus, I do not read Wilko v. Swan as a case giving fixed meaning to ambiguous statutory language. Rather, I believe it is more fairly construed as a case holding that in certain situations the enforceability of arbitration agreements should be denied as contrary to the public policy expressed in the statute as a whole ...

Scherk appealed to the Supreme Court, which heard the case in 1974. It reversed the Seventh Circuit 5–4 and ordered Alberto-Culver to arbitration. Potter Stewart, who wrote for the majority, based his holding on the international nature of the transaction. But he also briefly entertained a "colorable argument" that Wilko might not apply to the 1934 Act because of the differences in the corresponding sections, such as its limitation of the choice of forum to only federal courts as opposed to the state-court jurisdiction allowed under the 1933 Act.

"Wilko was held by the Court of Appeals to control this case—and properly so," countered William O. Douglas, the only justice remaining from the Wilko Court, in his dissent. He dismissed a suggestion that a law meant to protect small investors need not be held applicable to transactions between sophisticated companies, pointing out that Alberto-Culver had small shareholders as well who might have been victimized and "the rules when the giants play are the same as when the pygmies enter the market."

As to Stewart's "colorable argument", Douglas reiterated Wilko's wariness towards arbitration.

Here, as in Wilko, the allegations of fraudulent misrepresentation will involve "subjective findings on the purpose and knowledge" of the defendant, questions ill-determined by arbitrators without judicial instruction on the law. An arbitral award can be made without explication of reasons and without development of a record, so that the arbitrator's conception of our statutory requirement may be absolutely incorrect, yet functionally unreviewable, even when the arbitrator seeks to apply our law. We recognized in Wilko that there is no judicial review corresponding to review of court decisions. The extensive pretrial discovery provided by the Federal Rules of Civil Procedure for actions in district court would not be available. And the wide choice of venue provided by the 1934 Act ... would be forfeited. The loss of the proper judicial forum carries with it the loss of substantial rights.

==== Allegaert and early 1980s cases ====
Notwithstanding the questions raised by Scherk, in 1977 the Second Circuit finally held explicitly in Allegaert v. Perot, a case arising from the bankruptcy of DuPont Walston, that predispute arbitration clauses in 1934 Act cases were unenforceable. Judge Wilfred Feinberg wrote that while the circuit had enforced arbitration clauses in disputes between brokerage firms, per Congress's intent to let the industry police itself, "such acceptance does not decide this case." There were greater issues at stake: "This is more than a mere internal brokerage industry squabble; it raises broad questions of policy which ordinarily should be handled by the judiciary."

A few years later, the Supreme Court began hearing more arbitration cases, and expanding the scope and reach of the process in its decisions. Writing for a 1983 majority in Moses H. Cone Memorial Hospital v. Mercury Construction Corp., William Brennan held that the FAA enacted "a liberal federal policy favoring arbitration agreements, notwithstanding any state substantive or procedural policies to the contrary". One of his dicta in that case, that the FAA applies to contracts under state law as well, became the central holding of Southland Corp. v. Keating the following year.

In 1985, the Court once again heard a securities dispute where arbitrability was the central question. In Dean Witter Reynolds Inc. v. Byrd a brokerage firm sought to compel a client to arbitrate state-law fraud claims as Southland had required; the client resisted citing the need to avoid needless bifurcation. The Court held unanimously that the strong pro-arbitration policy it had found in the FAA in Moses Cone required that split.

Justice Byron White wrote a short concurrence in that case reminding his colleagues that the issues with the arbitrability of 1934 Act claims under Wilko that Stewart had explored in Scherk were still open. "Wilko's reasoning cannot be mechanically transplanted," he said. While the question was not then before the Court, it could not be assumed to be resolved.

==== Shearson/American Express Inc. v. McMahon ====
White's concurrence led some appeals courts to discard the Allegaert precedent when arbitrability arose in 1934 Act disputes. Others upheld it, creating a conflict in the circuits that the Supreme Court resolved by hearing Shearson/American Express Inc. v. McMahon in 1987.

Like Wilko, it had been appealed from the Second Circuit, where William Timbers, who had argued before the Court for the SEC as amicus in Wilko, wrote for a panel that reversed the district court's holding that the 1934 Act claims were arbitrable. He allowed that the Allegaert precedent he upheld might not survive higher review. "Although Scherk and Byrd may cast some doubt on whether the Supreme Court, if presented with the issue, would hold claims under [the 1934 Act] to be non-arbitrable, it would be improvident for us to disregard clear judicial precedent in this Circuit based on mere speculation."

Shortly after Byrd the Court had also held for the first time, in Mitsubishi Motors Corp. v. Soler Chrysler-Plymouth, Inc., that a statutory claim under the Sherman Act was arbitrable as well as a contractual one in the absence of explicit congressional intent to the contrary, overruling another widely accepted Second Circuit precedent in the process. In his majority opinion Harry Blackmun signaled that the Court was reconsidering the wariness of arbitration it had expressed in Wilko, at least in international disputes similar to Scherk. "[S]o long as the prospective litigant effectively may vindicate its statutory cause of action in the arbitral forum, the statute will continue to serve both its remedial and deterrent function."

In McMahon, the defendant had sought arbitration of claims not only under the 1934 Act but the more recent Racketeer Influenced and Corrupt Organizations Act (RICO). By a 5–4 margin the Court ruled for them, enforcing the arbitration clause in the plaintiffs' customer agreement. In a reversal of its longstanding position, the SEC filed an amicus supporting arbitration.

In her majority opinion, Sandra Day O'Connor not only reiterated the earlier points Stevens, Stewart and White had made about the differences between the two statutes, she added a further observation that the 1934 Act only forbade waivers of "compliance with any provision" of the statute, not "any provision" as the 1933 Act had it; therefore it was more clearly a procedural matter. She found the greatest distinction between the two cases, however, to be the change in judicial attitudes toward arbitration the Court had evinced in Scherk and its more recent cases. "The conclusion in Wilko was expressly based on the Court's belief that a judicial forum was needed to protect the substantive rights created by the Securities Act." Scherk, she wrote, "supports our understanding that Wilko must be read as barring waiver of a judicial forum only where arbitration is inadequate to protect the substantive rights at issue."

O'Connor also had a newer argument to contend with. The plaintiffs had pointed to sweeping changes Congress had made to both the 1933 and 1934acts in 1975. In neither act had the passages Wilko and Allegaert relied on been significantly changed. A conference committee report stated that "it was the clear understanding of the conferees that this amendment did not change existing law, as articulated in Wilko v. Swan."

"We find this argument fraught with difficulties." O'Connor responded. "We cannot see how Congress could extend Wilko to the Exchange Act without enacting into law any provision remotely addressing that subject." The passage and amendment discussed in the conference report were specifically intended to assure that the self-regulatory organizations of the securities industry, such as the exchanges and what was then the National Association of Securities Dealers, had legal authority to enforce disciplinary rulings against their members made by their own arbitration panels. In fact, she proposed, Congress may well have avoided the issue specifically with the intent of leaving it to the courts as a result of Scherk.

Dissenting this time, Blackmun read the conference report differently. Previously the Court had quoted, without comment, language calling the 1975 amendments "the most substantial and significant revision of this country's Federal securities laws since the passage of the Securities Exchange Act in 1934." "[T]he fact that this statement [in the conference committee report] was made in an amendment to the Exchange Act suggests that Congress was aware of the extension of Wilko to [1934 Act] claims," Blackmun argued. "Although the remark does not necessarily signify Congress' endorsement of this extension, in the absence of any prior congressional indication to the contrary, it implies that Congress was not concerned with arresting this trend. Such inaction during a wholesale revision of the securities laws, a revision designed to further investor protection, would argue in favor of Congress' approval of Wilko and its extension to [1934 Act] claims."

Blackmun turned to the "colorable argument" first made by Stewart in Scherk, calling it "a ghost reluctant to accept its eternal rest" that had received no development since then. It was really a device to introduce the argument that Wilko turned primarily on the acceptance of arbitration, a reading he described as "overly narrow", feeling it contradicted what he had written in Mitsubishi Motors. Wilko had found expressly that the 1933 Act created an exception to the FAA, which the majority did not deal with. And thus, it did not follow that if the court was more confident about arbitration and Wilko had been decided the way it had been solely because of this lack of confidence, then Wilko was no longer valid.

After reminding the majority that the Wilko Court had prefaced its doubts about arbitration with a review of the public-policy considerations behind the 1933 Act, Blackmun said even the former was insufficient justification. "Even if I were to accept the Court's narrow reading of Wilko as a case dealing only with the inadequacies of arbitration in 1953," he wrote, "I do not think that this case should be resolved differently today so long as the policy of investor protection is given proper consideration in the analysis." He allowed that progress had been made, but "several aspects of arbitration that were seen by the Wilko court to be inimical to the policy of investor protection still remain." Among them, he cited the lack of a written record of proceedings or justification for the decision, arbitrators' conflicts of interest and what he considered to be insufficient SEC oversight.

Stevens, elevated to the Supreme Court shortly after Scherk, added a short dissent of his own. He focused on how Wilko had endured. "[A]fter a statute has been construed, either by this Court or by a consistent course of decision by other federal judges and agencies, it acquires a meaning that should be as clear as if the judicial gloss had been drafted by the Congress itself," he reminded his colleagues. Every court that had considered the question until White's Byrd concurrence had found Wilko applicable to the 1934 Act. "This longstanding interpretation creates a strong presumption, in my view, that any mistake that the courts may have made in interpreting the statute is best remedied by the legislative, not the judicial, branch."

In a footnote, Stevens reconciled his dissents in the two cases:

Because I have never been convinced that the antifraud provisions of the federal securities laws were intended to apply to private transactions negotiated between fully informed parties of relatively equal bargaining strength, I was not at all surprised by the Court's decision in Scherk v. Alberto-Culver Co. refusing to apply the Wilko rule to such a case. As Justice Blackmun has demonstrated, that refusal was not predicated on any perceived difference between the 1933 Act and the 1934 Act, and it is thus fair to state that the decision the Court announces today changes a settled construction of the relevant statute.

==== Rodriguez de Quijas v. Shearson/American Express Inc. ====
McMahon, Blackmun claimed, "effectively overrules Wilko." Some district courts agreed. Within a few months of the decision, a California district judge held that it had "so seriously undermined Wilko's rationale" as to require him to order arbitration of 1933 Act claims. Others soon followed. An article in the University of Miami Law Review told its readers to expect "Wilko's Swan Song."

Eventually an appeals court agreed. Rodriguez de Quijas v. Shearson/American Express Inc., a case brought by several Texas investors alleging 1934 Act violations, reached the Fifth Circuit in 1988. Judge Jerre Stockton Williams wrote for a panel that compelled arbitration. "The reasoning in McMahon completely undermined Wilko," he wrote. "As McMahon makes clear, the Supreme Court no longer considers arbitration inadequate to protect substantive rights."

After an en banc rehearing was denied, the Supreme Court granted certiorari late that year. Oral arguments in March 1989 turned largely on the adequacy of arbitration to protect the plaintiffs' rights. Two months later the Court overruled Wilko 5–4.

Anthony Kennedy's majority opinion held, as had McMahon, that arbitration had improved enough since Wilko. "To the extent that Wilko rested on suspicion of arbitration as a method of weakening the protections afforded in the substantive law to would-be complainants," Kennedy wrote, "it has fallen far out of step with our current strong endorsement of the federal statutes favoring this method of resolving disputes." The three aspects of the 1933 Act that the Wilko Court had found to bar the waiver of the right to litigate were purely procedural and did not confer any substantive protections.

Stevens, writing for Brennan, Marshall and Blackmun, the same four justices who had dissented in McMahon, joined Kennedy in his criticism of the Fifth Circuit for overruling Wilko on its own., calling it "indefensible judicial activism". He extended that criticism to the Court itself. "When our earlier opinion gives a statutory provision concrete meaning, which Congress elects not to amend during the ensuing 3½ decades," he wrote, "our duty to respect Congress' work product is strikingly similar to the duty of other federal courts to respect our work product."

Once again, Stevens recalled his Scherk dissent. "There are valid policy and textual arguments on both sides regarding the interrelation of federal securities and arbitration Acts," he wrote. "None of these arguments, however, carries sufficient weight to tip the balance between judicial and legislative authority and overturn an interpretation of an act of Congress that has been settled for many years."

=== "Manifest disregard for the law" ===
Section 10 of the FAA enumerates the grounds on which courts may vacate arbitral awards: corruption, fraud, impartiality, misconduct or incompetence. Reed's dictum that "interpretations of the law by the arbitrators in contrast to manifest disregard" constitutes ground for reversal has been assumed erroneously by many later commentators and judges to be a doctrine originating with Wilko, shortened to "manifest disregard for the law." While it actually seems to echo a reference to "manifest mistake of law" in the much earlier United States v. Farragut, its usage in Wilko has survived Rodriguez de Quijas and created an unresolved question as to whether it merely referred to the grounds already enumerated by the FAA or constituted an additional, judicially created grounds. One commentator says "no greater mystery exists" in American arbitration law. Lower courts began taking up the question within a decade; the Supreme Court avoided dealing with it until Hall Street Associates, L. L. C. v. Mattel, Inc. in 2008, and chose not to resolve the issue at that time.

==== Bernhardt, Steelworkers and early attempts to define ====
Two years after Wilko, the Court considered another arbitration case, Bernhardt v. Polygraphic Co. It considered which state's law should govern an arbitration clause where there was diversity of citizenship, so there was little overlap with Wilko. But in a footnote to its only mention of that case, William O. Douglas's majority opinion said "Whether the arbitrators misconstrued a contract is not open to judicial review", citing two older appellate cases.

Early in 1960, the Second Circuit was asked to vacate an arbitration award on exactly those grounds in a dispute over whether two ships had been built to the contracted specifications. Charles Edward Clark, a member of the circuit's original Wilko panel, noted in his opinion the potentially contradictory nature of the Supreme Court's Wilko dictum and its Bernhardt footnote. While he found the incomplete record available to suggest that the question on which the arbitrators had differed to be one of fact rather than law, he upheld Bernhardt: "[T]he misapplication—if it be that—of such rules of contract interpretation does not rise to the stature of a 'manifest disregard' of law."

Later that year, in United Steelworkers v. Enterprise Wheel and Car Corp., the third of its "Steelworkers Trilogy" of cases that set the foundation for arbitration in industrial disputes involving organized labor, the Court gave another indirect suggestion as to what "manifest disregard" might mean. Douglas's majority opinion discussed the centrality of the collective bargaining agreement (CBA) between the union and management in resolving disputes:

... [A]n arbitrator is confined to interpretation and application of the [CBA]; he does not sit to dispense his own brand of industrial justice. He may of course look for guidance from many sources, yet his award is legitimate only so long as it draws its essence from the collective bargaining agreement. When the arbitrator's words manifest an infidelity to this obligation, courts have no choice but to refuse enforcement of the award.

A year after the Steelworkers Trilogy, the Ninth Circuit attempted to put all these cases together in another admiralty case where it was alleged arbitrators had seriously erred. Walter Lyndon Pope characterized Wilko's "manifest disregard' passage as dictum and noted the ambiguity: "The court did not undertake to define what it meant by 'manifest disregard' or indicate where the line would be drawn between a case of 'manifest disregard' and a case of error in interpretation of the law." In a footnote, the judge admitted that "Frankly, [this] has caused us trouble here" due to the potentially subjective nature of the test that could be devised.

"In this context," Pope continued, "it would appear that manifest disregard of the law must be something beyond and different from a mere error in the law or failure on the part of the arbitrators to understand or apply the law." He then considered the Bernhardt footnote and what this would mean. "We apprehend that a manifest disregard of the law in the context of the language used in Wilko v. Swan ... might be present when arbitrators understand and correctly state the law, but proceed to disregard the same," he wrote. "We think this is the sort of thing the Court had in mind in United Steelworkers".

Courts next began to consider another question: was "manifest disregard" just another way, in aggregate, of referring to those grounds already given in Section 10? Or was it in addition to those grounds? In 1967, the Second Circuit suggested it was the latter, but qualified it with "[a]ny such exception must be severely limited." Five years later, it explicitly described it as "judicially created", but raised the possibility that "some of [the FAA]'s terms [might be] construed to be synonymous with 'manifest disregard of the law.'"

Later that year, in Sobel v. Hertz, Warner & Co., another securities-fraud case, the circuit's Wilfred Feinberg attempted to draw a distinction. "An arbitration award will not be vacated for a mistaken interpretation of law" per Bernhardt, he wrote. "But if the arbitrators simply ignore the applicable law, the literal application of a 'manifest disregard' standard should presumably compel vacation of the award."

In another admiralty case two years later, James L. Oakes of the Second Circuit cited Sobel as "[i]llustrative of the difficulty inferior courts are having in 'attempts to define "manifest disregard."'" He considered that it might not ever have been necessary. "[P]erhaps the rubric 'manifest disregard' is after all not to be given independent significance; rather it is to be interpreted only in the context of the specific narrow provisions of [the FAA]."

The law around manifest disregard settled down for most of the 1980s, even if the issue had not been truly resolved. In a 1986 Second Circuit case, Judge Walter R. Mansfield summarized over three decades worth of jurisprudence on the issue in another securities-fraud claim:

It is not to be found in the federal arbitration law ... Although the bounds of this ground have never been defined, it clearly means more than error or misunderstanding with respect to the law ... The error must have been obvious and capable of being readily and instantly perceived by the average person qualified to serve as an arbitrator. Moreover, the term "disregard" implies that the arbitrator appreciates the existence of a clearly governing legal principle but decides to ignore or pay no attention to it ... We are not at liberty to set aside an arbitration panel's award because of an arguable difference regarding the meaning or applicability of laws urged upon it.

In the 1990 case Advest, Inc. v. McCarthy, the First Circuit found all the variations of phrasing used by different circuits, whether "manifest disregard for the law" or "arbitrary and capricious" amounted to one underlying standard. "We regard the standard of review undergirding these various formulations as identical, no matter how pleochroic their shadings," wrote Bruce Selya. "However nattily wrapped, the packages are fungible." He derived a standard from the pleadings of the petitioner, a securities firm seeking to overturn an award to a former customer, to be applied to all such cases outside of labor arbitration. "Advest is ... asserting that the relief granted in this case was chimerical: the law regarding damages was so clear and the arbitrators' award so irreconcilable with it that the panel must have disregarded the law and embarked on a flight of fancy."

With the Supreme Court having vastly expanded the use of arbitration through Byrd, McMahon, Rodriguez and other decisions, the issue of manifest disregard returned, with some courts taking a more skeptical view of the concept entirely. The Eleventh Circuit said in another securities-fraud case it had never adopted it, primarily because "the standard would likely never be met when the arbitrator provides no reasons for its award (which is typically the case)." Richard Posner, chief judge of the Seventh Circuit, criticized it strongly in a 1994 case, Bavarati v. Josephthal, Lyon & Ross, where future U.S. president Barack Obama argued before him the case of a broker who sought to uphold an award against his former employer:

The formula is dictum, as no one has found a case where, had it not been intoned, the result would have been different ... It originated in Wilko v. Swan—a case the Supreme Court first criticized for its mistrust of arbitration and confined to its narrowest possible holding, then overruled. Created ex nihilo to be a nonstatutory ground for setting aside arbitral awards, the Wilko formula reflects precisely that mistrust of arbitration for which the Court in its two Shearson/American opinions criticized Wilko. We can understand neither the need for the formula nor the role that it plays in judicial review of arbitration (we suspect none—that it is just words). If it is meant to smuggle review for clear error in by the back door, it is inconsistent with the entire modern law of arbitration. If it is intended to be synonymous with the statutory formula that it most nearly resembles—whether the arbitrators "exceeded their powers"—it is superfluous and confusing. There is enough confusion in the law. The grounds for setting aside arbitration awards are exhaustively stated in the statute. Now that Wilko is history, there is no reason to continue to echo its gratuitous attempt at nonstatutory supplementation.

==== Volt and contractual expansion of review ====
Shortly before Rodriguez, the Supreme Court had held in another arbitration case, Volt Information Sciences, Inc. v. Board of Trustees of Leland Stanford Junior University, that parties could, in their contracts, deviate from the terms of the FAA. They could specify when and where the arbitration could take place, and who could do it. Some lawyers, mindful of the unsettled debate over manifest disregard, began drafting contracts whose arbitration clauses provided for a more clearly defined standard of judicial review. That raised the question of whether parties could require more of judges than the FAA did. In 1995 the Fifth Circuit decided that the Supreme Court's pro-arbitration decisions from Moses Cone onwards required that they enforce the contract as written in Gateway Technologies, Inc. v. MCI Telecommunications Corp. Two years later the Ninth Circuit followed suit in LaPine Technology Corp. v. Kyocera Corp., where Judge Ferdinand Fernandez writing for the panel that "the FAA is not an apotropaion designed to avert overburdened court dockets; it is designed to avert interference with the contractual rights of the parties." Alex Kozinski concurred, but with the caveat that "Nowhere has Congress authorized courts to review arbitral awards under the standard the parties here adopted." He joined Fernandez only because "The review to which the parties have agreed is no different from that performed by the district courts in appeals from administrative agencies and bankruptcy courts, or on habeas corpus. I would call the case differently if the agreement provided that the district judge would review the award by flipping a coin or studying the entrails of a dead fowl."

The Tenth Circuit disagreed in the 2001 case Bowen v. Amoco Pipeline Co.. "Although the Court has emphasized that parties may 'specify by contract the rules under which arbitration will be conducted,' it has never said parties are free to interfere with the judicial process," wrote Chief Judge Deanell Reece Tacha. "[N]o authority clearly allows private parties to determine how federal courts review arbitration awards." In an en banc rehearing of a subsequent 2003 decision in the LaPine case, the Ninth Circuit took heed of Bowen and overruled itself. "A fortiori, private parties lack the power to dictate a broad standard of review when Congress has specifically prescribed a narrower standard," wrote Stephen Reinhardt.

In 2008 the Second Circuit held in Stolt-Nielsen S.A. v. AnimalFeeds International Corp. that Hall Street had not disallowed manifest disregard. The Supreme Court took the case and was widely expected to make a definitive ruling on the question. Instead, in 2010, it declined to do so and decided the case on other grounds.

==== Hall Street Associates, L.L.C. v. Mattel, Inc. ====
Despite the Ninth Circuit's change of mind, the split in the circuits persisted until 2008, when the Supreme Court decided Hall Street Associates, L.L.C. v. Mattel, Inc.. By a 6–3 margin the Court settled the issue, holding that parties cannot contract for a broader standard of review. However, it declined to further define "manifest disregard" or settle whether it was an addition to the FAA or just a way of summing its provisions up.

The parties had turned to arbitration to settle a lingering issue from the termination of a lease: whether Mattel was contractually bound to indemnify Hall Street for environmental contamination to the site of a factory it rented from Hall Street in Beaverton, Oregon until closing it in 2001. The arbitrator had decided that the statute covering the groundwater pollution was primarily a health law, and so ruled that Mattel did not have to pay Hall Street's costs. Since the arbitration agreement had taken the form of an order from a district judge, Mattel and Hall Street had included a provision that the judge could review the arbitration award, he did and the award was reversed. It went back and forth twice between the district court and the Ninth Circuit before the Supreme Court granted certiorari.

In his majority opinion, David Souter dismissed Hall Street's reliance on Wilko. "Although it is true that the Court's discussion [in that case] includes some language arguably favoring Hall Street's position, arguable is as far as it goes," he wrote. While Hall Street had argued that if judges could add reasons to vacate awards, contracting parties could to, "this is too much for Wilko to bear."

He also found the term itself too vague to rely on in this case. "Maybe the term 'manifest disregard' was meant to name a new ground for review," he speculated, echoing Posner in Bavarati, "but maybe it merely referred to the § 10 grounds collectively, rather than adding to them." In the past, the Court had "merely taken the Wilko language as we found it, without embellishment ... and now that its meaning is implicated, we see no reason to accord it the significance that Hall Street urges."

In the wake of the case, commentators and courts have remained divided over whether manifest disregard is still available as grounds to vacate an arbitration award. In Citigroup Global Markets, Inc. v. Bacon, the following year, the Fifth Circuit decided Hall Street had settled the question and overruled a district court's vacation of an award. The next year, 2010, the Eleventh Circuit followed suit in Frazier v. CitiFinancial Corp.

== Analysis and commentary ==
With the case's main holding overruled, Wilko is no longer discussed in the context of securities law. However, the exact meaning of "manifest disregard" continues to receive scholarly attention. One commentator has delved into its semantics and historical origins, suggesting that it may be construed more broadly than some of the interpreting courts have held.

In 2007, James Gaitis, a veteran international arbitrator, explored at length the prehistory of the FAA and the cases cited in Wilko's footnote 24. He found it to have a long tenure in American arbitration law, with roots going back to the 1698 English law that was greatly influential in the subsequent development of arbitration law both there and in "In their efforts to apply Wilko's admonition regarding manifest disregard, lower courts were, and continue to be, wrong in concluding that the Wilko Court's manifest disregard language represented newly anointed, 'judicially made' law," he wrote. "It should be just as obvious that in its attempt to apply traditional American arbitration law, the Wilko Court confused one principle and slightly rephrased another, thereby giving rise to the confusion that has perpetuated to this day."

Courts focused on the efficiency of arbitration are, Gaitis argues, among those most predisposed to hold that "manifest disregard" applies only to deliberate actions by arbitrators. But "[i]n so doing, federal courts not only fail to consider the historical context that preceded Wilko but also seemingly ignore the fact that common definitions of the word 'disregard' are not limited in a fashion that exclusively requires scienter," he writes. Common dictionary definitions of "disregard", as well as later uses of it by some of the justices who heard Wilko and other federal courts, strongly suggest to him that it was intended to include both intentional and negligent acts.

There is absolutely no reason to believe that when the Wilko Court cited those cases in its footnote 24 and then used the term disregard instead of mistake, the Court intended both to alter the meaning of those cases and to create an entirely new legal doctrine that narrowly addressed intentional acts by arbitrators in derogation of clearly known, existing law. Rather, the more logical conclusion is that when the Wilko Court employed the word disregard, it meant for the word to be inclusive such that it would be broadly defined to describe the circumstance in which the actor fails to give due consideration to a clearly established principle of law.

Gaitis scoffed at the notion that, in the interest of finality, parties must tolerate legal errors made by arbitrators. "[T]here is no policy objective that is served by 'deferring' to the tribunal's erroneous application of that law; the law and the parties both assume that it is the intention of the tribunal to correctly apply that law and that the parties' contractual rights will be determined not by some erroneous construction of that law but by the law as it stands," he wrote. "To hold otherwise is to suggest that when parties enter into an arbitration agreement that calls for the application of a particular law, they agree that the arbitrator can make the most blatant mistakes in the application of clearly established law such that their rights—conceivably including ongoing rights in a long-term contract—can legitimately be forever altered by an arbitral ruling based on a fundamental legal error that is plainly demonstrable."

Where the Wilko Court, rather than those misinterpreting it, had significantly erred, Gaitis wrote, was in confusing restricted and unrestricted arbitration submissions. "The catalyst for that error appears to be the unfounded supposition that to determine whether there are any restrictions on the scope of the arbitral tribunals' authority, an arbitration provision contained within a contract must be examined in utter isolation without giving consideration to other significant contractual provisions, particularly including a choice of law clause." Wilko's agreement with Hayden Stone had specified that the 1934 Act controlled, but the Court, having read the arbitration clause in isolation from the rest of the contract, decided that that language probably included the 1933 Act as well, since the arbitration clause had not specified any controlling law for the procedure. By thus suggesting that an unrestricted submission was subject to the "manifest disregard" principle for vacatur, the Court contradicted the precedent it was relying on. "Under the very cases cited by the Wilko Court," Gaitis observed, "arbitrators acting under an unrestricted submission are free to manifestly and knowingly disregard the law should they elect to resolve the dispute in a different manner." He concluded that "the Court's misdescription of the arbitration provisions as being 'unrestricted,' together with the Court's use of the word 'disregard" as a synonym for 'mistake,' have given rise vicariously to an illegitimate legal doctrine, recognized by every federal circuit, that thwarts the primary objective of the FAA and leaves parties without a legal remedy for clearly demonstrable errors in the application of definitively established law."

== See also ==
- Arbitration case law in the United States
- List of overruled U.S. Supreme Court decisions
- List of United States Supreme Court cases, volume 346
- List of United States Supreme Court cases by the Warren Court
