= Rodriguez de Quijas v. Shearson/American Express Inc. =

- Supreme Court of the United States

Argued March 27, 1989 Decided May 15, 1989
- Full case name: Opelia Rodriguez de Quijas, et al., Plaintiffs-Appellees, v. Shearson/Lehman Brothers Inc., f/k/a Shearson/American Express, Inc., and Jon Grady Deaton, Defendants-Appellants. Mary Grace Norman, Plaintiff-Appellee, v. Shearson/Lehman Brothers Inc., f/k/a Shearson/American Express, Inc., etc., et al., Defendants-Appellants. Adelina Trapero, Plaintiff-Appellee, v. Shearson/Lehman Brothers Inc., f/k/a Shearson/American Express, Inc., Its Successors and Assigns, and Jon Grady Deaton, Jointly and Severally, Defendants-Appellants. Gene Griffin and Gertrud Griffin, Plaintiffs-Appellees, v. Shearson/Lehman Brothers Inc, f/k/a Shearson/American Express, Inc., etc., et al., Defendants-Appellants.
- Docket no.: 88-385
- Citations: 490 U.S. 477 (more) 109 S. Ct. 1917; 104 L. Ed. 2d 526
- Argument: Oral argument
- Opinion announcement: Opinion announcement

Case history
- Prior: Arbitration compelled, 845 F.2d 1296 (5th Cir. 1989)

Holding
- Arbitration procedures have improved enough since Wilko v. Swan to sufficiently guarantee protection of investor rights under Securities Act of 1933; appellate court decision overruling that case is upheld but Supreme Court retains exclusive prerogative to overrule its own precedent in future. Fifth Circuit affirmed.

Court membership
- Chief Justice William Rehnquist Associate Justices William J. Brennan Jr. · Byron White; Thurgood Marshall · Harry Blackmun; John P. Stevens · Sandra Day O'Connor; Antonin Scalia · Anthony Kennedy

Case opinions
- Majority: Kennedy, joined by Rehnquist, White, O'Connor, Scalia
- Dissent: Stevens, joined by Brennan, Marshall, Blackmun

Laws applied
- Federal Arbitration Act, Securities Act of 1933
- This case overturned a previous ruling or rulings
- Wilko v. Swan (1953)

Rodriguez de Quijas v. Shearson/American Express Inc., 490 U.S. 477 (1989), is a United States Supreme Court decision holding that investors’ claims under the Securities Act of 1933 can be resolved through arbitration under the Federal Arbitration Act. The case arose from suits by Texas investors against their brokerage house. By a 5–4 margin the Court affirmed the Fifth Circuit Court of Appeals and ruled that their claims under the Securities Act of 1933, which regulates trading in the primary market, must be arbitrated as stipulated in their customer agreements.

The decision overruled the 1953 Wilko v. Swan decision. Justice Anthony Kennedy's majority opinion found that arbitration procedures offered more adequate protection for investors than they had when that case was decided. John Paul Stevens's short dissent criticized the majority for taking it upon itself to overturn a precedent that, he argued, Congress had purposely left intact during a major overhaul of the securities laws in the mid-1970s. Both opinions criticized the Fifth Circuit for disregarding Wilko, emphasizing that only the Supreme Court may overrule its own precedents.

Many courts besides the Fifth Circuit had chosen to disregard Wilko after the Supreme Court's own decision in Shearson/American Express Inc. v. McMahon that claims under the Securities Exchange Act of 1934, which applies to the secondary market, were also arbitrable if a contract so provided cast serious doubt on the logic of the older case. As a result of Rodriguez de Quijas, many more securities fraud claims were heard in arbitration instead of the courts, an intended outcome that has supporters and critics and led to long-term changes in how the securities industry conducts arbitration. The decision was the last in the Mitsubishi trilogy, which expanded the use of arbitration from contractual disputes to statutory claims during the 1980s.

== Underlying dispute ==
In the early 1980s several small first-time investors in Brownsville, Texas, opened accounts with Shearson/American Express agent Jon Grady Deaton. They included minors, widows, and terminally ill people; some could not understand English. Their investments with him totaled about $400,000 ($1.3 million in 2025).

They later alleged that Deaton had mismanaged some of the money and churned the accounts, making trades solely to generate commissions for himself. They brought suit in federal court for the Southern District of Texas alleging securities fraud under the applicable state and federal laws. Shearson moved to compel arbitration, as the plaintiffs' customer agreements committed them to using that method of dispute resolution. The court granted the motion for all claims except those under the Securities Act of 1933 (the 1933 Act), which regulates trading in the primary market and was still considered non-arbitrable.

Shearson appealed to the Fifth Circuit Court of Appeals, asking that the 1933 Act claims be arbitrated as well. In 1953 the Supreme Court had explicitly held otherwise in Wilko v. Swan. But in 1987, it had held in Shearson/American Express Inc. v. McMahon that claims under the similar Securities Exchange Act of 1934 (the "1934 Act"), which regulates the secondary market where the vast majority of securities are traded, were arbitrable, overruling several appeals court precedents that had extended the Wilko holding to the 1934 Act.

McMahon's logic, Shearson argued, meant that Wilko was no longer applicable even if the Supreme Court had not yet overruled it. In the two years since that case, many district court judges had taken it upon themselves to overrule it, and while no appeals court had yet upheld those decisions, the Fifth Circuit, in Noble v. Drexel Burnham Lambert, had expressed doubts as to its continuing viability. The plaintiffs argued that Wilko was still good law because it reflected congressional intent to protect investors by guaranteeing them recourse to the courts. Even if it were not, they allowed, the contract still did not clearly establish the parties' intent to arbitrate all claims.

== Appeals court ==
Judges William Homer Thornberry, Jerre Stockton Williams and W. Eugene Davis were empaneled to hear the case. They heard oral arguments in the case and handed down its decision in May 1988. Unanimously, in a decision written by Williams, they found for Shearson and held Wilko inapplicable.

Williams considered the case in light of McMahon and other recent arbitration jurisprudence. While in that case Wilko's protections had not been before the Court, the similarities between the 1933 and 1934 acts was close enough that it was hard to see why a holding that applied to one would not also apply to the other. "The reasoning in McMahon completely undermined Wilko ... As McMahon makes clear, the Supreme Court no longer considers arbitration inadequate to protect substantive rights," wrote Williams.

The plaintiffs argued, as Justice Harry Blackmun had in his McMahon dissent, that since Congress had implied a stated attempt to leave Wilko's holding alone during a 1975 revamp of securities laws, it had given its assent and wished 1933 Act claims to be nonarbitrable while 1934 Act claims were. "We find it implausible that Congress intended to prohibit arbitration of Securities Act claims but intended to allow courts to determine the arbitrability of Exchange Act claims," he wrote. While there were, indeed, fine distinctions between the two statutes, "... McMahon, which binds us here, turns solely on the adequacy of arbitration to resolve securities disputes." Since circuit precedent held that the similarities between the two were more significant for interpretation purposes than the differences, "'[w]e thus follow the reasoning of the Supreme Court in McMahon and our own decision in Noble which lead directly to the obsolescence of Wilko and the arbitrability of Securities Act § 12(2) claims." And because McMahon had been handed down before they filed suit, the plaintiffs could not argue that they did not intend to arbitrate a 1933 Act claim since the possibility that they might have to already existed.

== Supreme Court ==
A request for an en banc rehearing of the case was denied a month later. The plaintiffs petitioned the Supreme Court for certiorari. It was granted in November. Oral arguments were heard in March of 1989.

=== Oral arguments ===
Denis Downey, who had represented the plaintiffs from the district court onwards, argued for them. Theodore Krebsbach, who had argued McMahon before the Court, argued again for Shearson. Downey was permitted a short time for rebuttal after Krebsbach finished.

==== Petitioners ====
"In the petitioners' view," Downey told the justices, "the Federal Arbitration Act has been read much too broadly." It had been intended, as its language indicated, to put arbitration agreements on an equal footing with other contracts, but courts had more recently been reading it as superseding all other statutes when the two conflicted. "We do not see an elevated federal policy in the Federal Arbitration Act."

Adopting that view, he admitted, would require the Court to reconsider many of its recent decisions on the subject of arbitration. "Our purpose here is, rather than in the absolute sense, to try to create a better comparative balance," Downey said. "We see the Federal Arbitration Act as involving federal policies of considerably less importance than that of the 1933 Securities Act."

The justices asked him to distinguish the two acts. Downey answered that the 1934 Act might have been meant to protect sellers less. He added that the 1933 Act's legislative history was relevant to the present case. "[It] would seem to show that Congress realized that it was important that private enforcement would be used to effectuate the goals [of the act]."

One justice wanted to know about the adhesion issue. Could it be used to defeat the contracts even if they were held arbitrable? It hadn't been discussed in the lower courts, "and that's a major problem in this whole arbitration area," Downey claimed, since it could only have been brought up if the contract was challenged as fraudulently induced. "[D]istrict courts really don't get to review these things until after arbitration," he commented. Leaving such issues to the enforcement stage needlessly delayed dispute resolution, since it was necessary sometimes to rearbitrate the case. "I think if there's a fundamental claim like that, the district court ought to decide it up front."

Downey returned to Wilko and how it was applicable to the facts of the case. "[W]e think it's very clear, based on 36 years of what legal commentators said and based on every decision of this Court with the exception of McMahon, that Wilko said that the waiver of the choices in Section 22 amounted to an attempted waiver of the provision." It was not always possible, he added, to appeal an arbitrators' decision.

In conclusion, Downey told the justices, "our basic position is also that this is the worst possible choice we're being given." He believed any arbitrators would favor the industry, and that the Securities and Exchange Commission (SEC) could not be trusted to look out for the interests of small investors in arbitration. "[T]he Court should give some consideration to protecting the unsophisticated investor." He felt it was ironic to be in this position:

... [A]fter what can only be described as the great history of this Court that has given us one man, one vote, and ended segregation, the principle of judicial review, that there are no true amicus who come before this Court to in fact defend the role of this Court, and really that that defense falls to a somewhat sad group of investors from Brownsville, Texas, whose greatest expectation in all of this is to simply recover their life savings.

==== Shearson ====
Krebsbach began by assuring the justices that arbitration could vindicate the petitioners' rights as well as a trial. The SEC, he said, had already suggested Wilko should be overruled in its McMahon amicus curiae brief. The justices wanted to know if, as they suggested, their claims should still be litigated even if the Court overruled Wilko because they had signed their agreements before McMahon. He believed they could be arbitrated since it would not be found prejudicial.

Sandra Day O'Connor asked Krebsbach where the cases would be arbitrated. "It would take place usually in the venue closest to where the plaintiff resides" notwithstanding the absence of contractual language to that effect. "That has been the practice for as long as I can recall."

Krebsbach returned to his argument. "[T]he Court has articulated time and time again over the past 15 years that a plaintiff does not waive substantive rights in arbitration," he said. "There is nothing in the Securities Act of 1933, any more than there is in the Exchange Act of 1934, which expresses a Congressional intent to prohibit arbitration of Securities Act claims." While the anti-waiver provisions could have been read that way, McMahon rendered them both moot.

Petitioners were wrong to claim that a sentence in a report on the 1975 amendments indicated Congressional support of Wilko. "Congress never said in this single sentence in 1975 what it thought that the Wilko law was" and McMahon had already rejected that argument. Nor had Congress, in securities law amendments since McMahon, enacted any affecting arbitration.

Krebsbach touted at length the changes to securities arbitration rules since McMahon. Arbitrators would have to disclose more about their background, and those who were recently retired from the industry would no longer be considered members of the public. A transcript of the proceedings would also be required. He conceded, however, that none of these rules would apply to the plaintiffs' case.

Should the Court, Krebsbach was asked, overrule a case that had depended on statutory interpretation simply because it was wrong, rather than leaving it to Congress? If it did, then there were many other such cases that it would have to overrule. He said that there was no practical difference between the two acts, and that if the Court declined to overrule Wilko it would not be undermining McMahon. "I think it would also cause a lot of confusion with respect to the arbitration of other statutory disputes," he said. "Wilko really stands alone with respect to this Court's arbitration jurisprudence, in that it's really the only case where it in the first instance presumed that the arbitration forum was inadequate."

"I believe that the Court in McMahon also said that Congress has left this issue to the courts because they believe in the first instance it would make no sense for Congress to have to conduct an inquiry on each occasion whether a particular arbitration forum was inadequate," he elaborated. " Prodded on why Congress itself might not have acted, he said "I believe that they think that the [current securities] arbitration system is adequate."

Krebsbach admitted that his argument was ultimately that the arbitration system was now adequate to protect investors' rights, and that by doing so it would reduce the burden on the federal courts. "It's not necessarily the reason, but that would be one of the results." Again he touted the rule changes: Attorneys would now have subpoena power, there would be prehearing conferences to resolve any side disputes, and arbitrators could refer to the securities industry's self-regulatory organizations any action that they believed merited disciplinary proceedings.

"Respondents believe that the stare decisis doctrine is best served by the Court ruling that [Wilko] is no longer good law," Krebsbach argued again, addressing concerns about Wilko having been settled law for so many years. "If [it] is overruled, there will be a consistent interpretation and application by this Court of the Federal Arbitration Act in numerous decisions over the past 15 years."

==== Rebuttal ====
It had been two years since McMahon, Downey noted, none of the changes Krebsbach promised had been made. Nor were two that he felt very important even proposed. Arbitrators would not be required to give legal reasons for their decisions, making appeals more difficult, nor had the selection process been reformed. "The truth is that we think the industry cheats."

In response to O'Connor, Downey said Krebsbach had not indicated that the arbitrations were scheduled to take place in Dallas, approximately 500 miles (800 km) from Brownsville. "We don't trust securities arbitration," Downey repeated. "If Mr. Krebsbach were to go outside in the hall and offer to enter into an agreement to arbitrate that wasn't an [industry] arbitration, we'd be much more inclined to do so."

=== Decision ===
The Court handed down its decision in May, almost two months later. By a 5–4 margin it had sided with Shearson, ruling that the claims must be arbitrated and overruling Wilko. Justice Anthony Kennedy wrote for the majority. John Paul Stevens dissented, joined by William Brennan, Thurgood Marshall and Harry Blackmun.

==== Majority ====
"To the extent that Wilko rested on suspicion of arbitration as a method of weakening the protections afforded in the substantive law to would-be complainants," Kennedy wrote, "it has fallen far out of step with our current strong endorsement of the federal statutes favoring this method of resolving disputes." The three aspects of the 1933 Act that the Wilko Court had found to bar the waiver of the right to litigate were purly procedural and did not confer any substantive protections. Specifically, the provision that allowed claims to be filed in state court under the act without the possibility of removal to federal court amounted to a waiver of the procedural protections federal civil procedure might grant to a plaintiff. In other recent cases, the Court had found that neither the similar provisions of the 1934 Act nor the Sherman Act prevented claims under them from being resolved in arbitration. And the FAA allowed for an arbitration agreement to be voided just like any other contract.

Kennedy rebuked the Fifth Circuit for "renouncing" Wilko. "If a precedent of this Court has direct application in a case, yet appears to rest on reasons rejected in some other line of decisions, the Court of Appeals should follow the case which directly controls, leaving to this Court the prerogative of overruling its own decisions." He confirmed that the Court was overruling Wilko as "inconsistent with the prevailing uniform construction of other federal statutes governing arbitration agreements in the setting of business transactions." In this specific instance there was a further reason:

It also would be undesirable for the decisions in Wilko and McMahon to continue to exist side by side. Their inconsistency is at odds with the principle that the 1933 and 1934 Acts should be construed harmoniously because they "constitute interrelated components of the federal regulatory scheme governing transactions in securities." ... In this case, for example, petitioners' claims under the 1934 Act were subjected to arbitration, while their claim under the 1933 Act was not permitted to go to arbitration, but was required to proceed in court. That result makes little sense for similar claims, based on similar facts, which are supposed to arise within a single federal regulatory scheme. In addition, the inconsistency between Wilko and McMahon undermines the essential rationale for a harmonious construction of the two statutes, which is to discourage litigants from manipulating their allegations merely to cast their claims under one of the securities laws, rather than another. For all of these reasons, therefore, we overrule the decision in Wilko.

Having established that Wilko was overruled, Kennedy considered the petitioners' request that if the Court did so it should nevertheless not apply it to their case or any other pending litigation. "We disagree," he wrote. "The general rule of long standing is that the law announced in the Court's decision controls the case at bar." There had been exceptions, such as Chevron Oil Co. v. Huson, but the logic of that case dicated a retroactive application of the decision here. "Although our decision to overrule Wilko establishes a new principle of law for arbitration agreements under the Securities Act, this ruling furthers the purposes and effect of the Arbitration Act without undermining those of the Securities Act" since the plaintiffs had not agreed to arbitrate based in whole or part on Wilko not being overruled."

==== Dissent ====
Stevens joined Kennedy in criticizing the Fifth Circuit's decision to go against Wilko, calling it "an indefensible brand of judicial activism." He extended that criticism to the Court itself. "When our earlier opinion gives a statutory provision concrete meaning, which Congress elects not to amend during the ensuing 3½ decades," he wrote, "our duty to respect Congress' work product is strikingly similar to the duty of other federal courts to respect our work product."

As a judge of the Seventh Circuit, Stevens reminded his colleagues, he had dissented from that court's holding in the case that eventually reached the Supreme Court as Scherk v. Alberto-Culver Co., a key arbitration precedent where Potter Stewart had made a "colorable argument" that the 1933 and 1934 acts were dissimilar enough that Wilko might not apply to the latter. "There are valid policy and textual arguments on both sides regarding the interrelation of federal securities and arbitration Acts," he wrote. "None of these arguments, however, carries sufficient weight to tip the balance between judicial and legislative authority and overturn an interpretation of an Act of Congress that has been settled for many years."

== Analysis and commentary ==
Since the decision made almost all securities fraud claims brought by investors against their brokerages arbitrable as almost every customer agreement had a clause mandating it, its practical effect has been to increase the use of arbitration in that context. As such Rodriguez de Quijas was criticized and championed in its aftermath. Another commentator has criticized the Court for its stance against "anticipatory overruling."

The year after the decision, 1990, Indiana University law professor William Hermann summed up where the decision left investors. While his paper was mostly devoted to pending and proposed securities arbitration reforms, he had some comments on the case itself. "To the Rodriguez majority, the policies behind the Arbitration Act, a less significant piece of legislation both in terms of size and scope than the landmark securities statutes, apparently outweighed any other policy considerations," he observed.

Hermann noted that the SEC's enforcement powers were, at the time, "extremely limited". Kennedy's refusal to go into them, instead referring the reader to O'Connor's majority opinion in McMahon, "completely ignored Justice Blackmun's concerns in McMahon, and the realities of the current environment." He concluded that "The Supreme Court, in what may be seen as a blatant attempt to reduce the federal docket, has made itself undeniably clear: Wilko is dead and arbitration is king."

Loyola Law School professor Lydia Hervatin offered an extended critique of the majority opinion in a 1991 paper. "[N]either the majority's questioning of Wilko, nor the Court's grounds for overruling Wilko can be logically justified," she wrote. On the first ground, the Court had "failed to elucidate why a statute prohibiting waiver of 'any provision' should be read as prohibiting only waivers of any substantive provision," since previous decisions had recognized that procedural issues could affect the outcome of a case.

Hervatin had more to say about the majority's judgement that arbitration was now more suitable for dispute resolution than it had been in 1953. "Having dismissed the Wilko Court's holding as the result of an outdated bias," she wrote:

the Court substituted its more modern bias in favor of arbitration by unreasoned exhortation ... If changes in judicial attitudes are accepted as a sound basis for overruling precedent, [then] the Court should decide cases by opinion polls rather than opinions ... If Wilko correctly analyzed the intent of Congress in resolving the conflict between the FAA policy in favor of arbitration and the Securities Act anti-waiver provision policy, it should hardly matter whether a majority of the Supreme Court agrees with the way Congress wrote the laws.

"Viewing Rodriguez de Quijas in its historical context" Hervatin continued, "raises more basic issues as to the intellectual honesty of the opinion." If, as the Court contended, the decision was necessitated by the need to ensure that the 1933 and 1934 Acts were interpreted harmoniously and consistently, then it should have acknowledged that it had itself created the inconsistency. "The process leading the Court to Rodriguez de Quijas resembles that of a doctor seeking to euthanize a patient whose ill health arose from the physician's neglect," she wrote. "If Wilko and McMahon are so fatally inconsistent, perhaps the Court should have considered the matter in writing McMahon."

The majority had also failed to consider what the differences between the two acts demonstrated about Congressional intent, Hervatin argued. The 1933 Act's grant of the investor's choice of any state or federal jurisdiction was intended to allow the customer the choice to litigate or arbitrate at the outset, while the limitation to federal jurisdiction in the 1934 Act was meant only to speed litigation by eliminating the requirement to prove diversity of citizenship at the outset. By holding predispute arbitration agreements enforceable, the Court had effectively limited the customer's choice of forum and broadened the broker's, since "[t]he customer usually has a right to compel the broker to arbitrate regardless of the existence of a predispute agreement."

Hervatin reiterated aspects of Blackmun's McMahon dissent, pointing out that the Rodriguez de Quijas majority had ignored Wilko's public-policy justifications entirely. Stevens's dissent in Rodriguez de Quijas pointing to Congress's silence on the issue, she added, made the "majority's reliance on federal pro-arbitration policy appear all the more misplaced." She chastised the majority for saying that the petitioners had failed to meet their burden of proof without suggesting how they might have done so, and concluded that "The majority's reasoning thus displays a marked asymmetry in the Court's openness to assumptions beyond the record and suggests that the majority's defense of its decision was more of an after-the-fact rationalization than an explanation of the basis for its opinion."

Defending Rodriguez de Quijas later that same year was Gregory Malson, a student at Golden Gate University School of Law. "[T]he investor today is fully protected in an arbitral forum, " he wrote, "and ... the advantages to the investor who arbitrates a claim against their broker are expansive." He touted both the reforms to the procedure and a recent decision by the New York Court of Appeals, the highest court in that state, allowing investors to choose to arbitrate before the American Arbitration Association even where their contracts specified the internal panels of the NASD or the exchanges, as boding well for the many investors who would now have to arbitrate their claims.

University of Nebraska College of Law professor C. Steven Bradford criticized Rodriguez de Quijas for an entirely different reason: its rejection of the anticipatory overruling of Wilko by the Fifth Circuit and the other lower courts. While there had been two lines of jurisprudence on the issue of whether the lower courts should feel bound by precedent the Supreme Court seemed reasonably likely to overrule, in Rodriguez de Quijas "the Court finally spoke in favor of blind obedience to precedent." It was long overdue, he wrote, but:

[u]nfortunately, the Court chose the wrong position. By focusing so narrowly on an inflexible rule of stare decisis, the Court overlooked the very policies that stare decisis is meant to serve. Anticipatory overruling makes the law more responsive to change, it ensures litigants fair and equal treatment, it enhances the predictability of the law and it promotes judicial efficiency. Instead of condemning the lower courts that refused to follow Wilko, the Supreme Court should have applauded them.

While Kennedy had criticized the majority opinion quite strongly, he had used even harsher language to join Kennedy in reprimanding the Fifth Circuit. "Thus, all of the justices summarily rejected anticipatory overruling, without considering its possible benefits," Bradford wrote. But the majority's Rodriguez de Quijas arguments themselves contradicted McMahon's reading of Wilko. Where O'Connor in the earlier case had held that Wilko rejected arbitration only as inadequate to protect an investor's substantive rights, Kennedy read Wilko as inherently inapplicable to the substantive provisions.

The Court had tolerated anticipatory overruling in the wake of Brown v. Board of Education and at the end of the Lochner era, Bradford observed. This had broad social benefits:

Without anticipatory overruling, legal progress is segmented. The law lurches forward first in one limited area and then in another, as the Supreme Court slowly changes its rules on a narrow, case-by-case basis. Policies that the Supreme Court no longer approves remain frozen in time. Obsolete, disapproved rulings continue to control people's behavior until a case presenting that precise issue again works its way to the Supreme Court. Anticipatory overruling, on the other hand, allows the law to adjust to changes in Supreme Court policy more rapidly. The transition is smoother and the benefits of new federal policies become available to the public more quickly.

Bradford called Rodriguez de Quijas "a knee-jerk reaction by the Supreme Court to the refusal of the lower courts to accept an iron-clad rule of stare decisis." He called for reconsideration.

The lower courts that rejected Wilko in the aftermath of McMahon were not doing so to be unfaithful to Wilko; they were doing so to be faithful to McMahon. The Rodriguez Court, overly eager to protect the doctrine of stare decisis, failed to consider whether the policy concerns behind stare decisis support a requirement that the lower courts blindly follow even the most doubtful Supreme Court precedent. In fact, these policies do not support such a requirement. Anticipatory overruling is not an attack on the policies supporting stare decisis; it is an affirmation of them.

== See also ==
- Arbitration case law in the United States
- List of United States Supreme Court cases by the Rehnquist Court
- List of United States Supreme Court cases, volume 490
