= Southland Corp. v. Keating =

1983 U.S. Supreme Court arbitration-law case

- Supreme Court of the United States

Argued October 4, 1983 Decided January 23, 1984
- Full case name: Southland Corp. v. Keating
- Citations: 465 U.S. 1 (more) 104 S. Ct. 852; 79 L. Ed. 2d 1

Case history
- Prior: 167 Cal.Rptr. 481, trial court reversed; 31 Cal.3d 584, 645 P.2d 1192, appeals court reversed and remanded

Holding
- Intent of Congress in passing Federal Arbitration Act was to encourage use of arbitration as widely as possible, therefore it applies to contracts executed under state law. California Supreme Court reversed and remanded

Court membership
- Chief Justice Warren E. Burger Associate Justices William J. Brennan Jr. · Byron White; Thurgood Marshall · Harry Blackmun; Lewis F. Powell Jr. · William Rehnquist; John P. Stevens · Sandra Day O'Connor

Case opinions
- Majority: Burger, joined by Brennan, White, Marshall, Blackmun, Powell
- Concur/dissent: Stevens
- Dissent: O'Connor, joined by Rehnquist

Laws applied
- Federal Arbitration Act, § 2

Southland Corp. v. Keating, 465 U.S. 1 (1984), is a United States Supreme Court decision concerning arbitration. It was originally brought by 7-Eleven franchisees in California state courts, alleging breach of contract by the chain's then parent corporation. Southland pointed to the arbitration clauses in their franchise agreements and said it required disputes to be resolved that way; the franchisees cited state franchising law voiding any clause in an agreement that required franchisees to waive their rights under that law. A 7-2 majority held that the Federal Arbitration Act (FAA) applied to contracts executed under state law.

Chief Justice Warren Burger wrote for the majority that it was clearly the intent of Congress in passing the FAA to encourage the use of arbitration as widely as possible, that it enacted "a national policy favoring arbitration." Justice Sandra Day O'Connor dissented, along with William Rehnquist, arguing that the legislative history of the FAA strongly suggested it was intended to apply only to contracts executed under federal law. In later years, Clarence Thomas would make those arguments the foundation of a series of dissents from cases concerning the application of the FAA to state law, even in cases for which O'Connor decided with the majority, citing stare decisis.

The decision was a turning point in the use of arbitration in American contract law, as it was followed with other decisions limiting the authority of states to regulate arbitration. It has been described as "perhaps the most controversial case in the Supreme Court's history of arbitration jurisprudence." Its legal foundation has been examined and disputed, and some critics have found the FAA's legislative history directly contradicts the court's holding. One scholar has even found the decision an unconstitutional infringement of states' power over their own courts. Mandatory prebinding arbitration clauses became widespread, particularly in credit card agreements and other consumer services. Proponents of arbitration pointed to its success in reducing crowded court dockets, but consumer advocates charged that the arbitration process was biased in favor of large corporations and against consumers, many of whom were far poorer and legally unsophisticated. They would be joined in calling unsuccessfully for it to be overturned in a later case by 20 state attorneys general.

== Background ==
The plaintiffs, all 7-Eleven franchisees, filed suit individually in California Superior Court charging Southland with fraud, misrepresentation, breach of contract, breach of fiduciary duty and violations of disclosure provisions required in California's Franchise Investment Law (CFIL) between 1975 and 1977. Their actions were consolidated with another filed separately by Keating in Alameda County seeking class certification for all franchisees. Southland sought to compel arbitration per the franchise agreements. The Superior Court granted that request except for the CFIL claims, citing Section 31512 of that statute under which any contractual language that binds a franchisee to waive rights it grants was void. It neither saw it as conflicting with the FAA and nor ruled on the motion for class certification.

A state appeals court reversed that decision, reading the arbitration clause to require the arbitration of all claims under the contract, including those under the CFIL. If the CFIL's language created an exception, it was superseded by the federal law and thus unenforceable. It directed the trial court to begin hearing the class certification motion.

The plaintiffs appealed to the California Supreme Court. It ruled in their favor, seeing the CFIL as requiring adjudication of all claims brought under it, and not in conflict with the FAA. Again, the case was remanded to trial court with an instruction to begin hearing the class certification motion.

=== Existing arbitration law ===
New York City merchants, who had embraced arbitration as a method of alternative dispute resolution in the early 20th century, persuaded Congress to pass the FAA in 1925. Until then many courts had been wary of the process, sometimes even refusing to accept it as binding. After they had persuaded New York to pass a state law allowing for the results of an arbitration to be considered binding on both parties, that statute became the model for the FAA.

For the first few decades after it was passed the FAA was understood to be applicable to contracts executed under federal law, specifically those concerning . The Supreme Court first considered a case related to it in Wilko v. Swan, where a 7-2 majority found that the anti-waiver provisions of the Securities Act of 1933 voided an arbitration clause where securities fraud was alleged. The issue of a conflict with state law came up a few years later in Bernhardt v. Polygraphic Co., where the court, with only Harold Hitz Burton dissenting, had refused to allow a federal court to decide whether an arbitration clause was valid simply because one party to the dispute had moved to another state than the one in which the contract was originally executed. In 1959 the Second Circuit Court of Appeals suggested that the FAA applied to state court actions as well, when it ruled that disputes over not just the execution but the contract itself were arbitrable.

In the 1967 Prima Paint case the Court had opened the door to more widespread use of arbitration when it adopted the separability principle, compelling arbitration of a claim that a contract had been fraudulently induced. That held that any challenge to the validity of a contract with an arbitration clause must be heard by the arbitrator first unless the challenge is to the arbitration clause itself. It creates a legal fiction that two separate contracts exist.

The term before it heard Southland's appeal, a 6-3 court had, in Moses H. Cone Memorial Hospital v. Mercury Construction Corp., upheld an appellate decision that overturned a district court's stay of a federal action to compel arbitration pending the disposition of a parallel action in state court. The primary issue in that case had been the proper application of the Colorado River abstention doctrine and whether the lower court's decision was appealable. In passing, the opinion noted that "state courts, as much as federal courts, are obliged to grant stays of litigation under § 3 of the Arbitration Act.... Congress can hardly have meant that an agreement to arbitrate can be enforced against a party who attempts to litigate an arbitrable dispute in federal court, but not against one who sues on the same dispute in state court."

== Before the Court ==
At oral argument in late 1983, Mark Spooner pointed to the dictum in Cone the previous term stating that the FAA applied to the states. He held firm despite being challenged on that reading. "[I]f Section 2 were read otherwise... [t]hat would lead to forum shopping and would destroy the predictability in interstate commercial dealings that is so important," he told the justices. "What Congress gives it can take away, but the states cannot take away what Congress has made valid and enforceable in a federal statute."

"[Q]uite apart from encouraging forum shopping, the conclusion if the Supreme Court of California's decision is upheld," responded John Wells, "the decision that Southland is asking for is the one that would encourage forum shopping." He noted that in securities law upheld in Wilko, Congress had not only included an anti-waiver provision but also encouraged the states to pass parallel legislation, many of which included anti-waiver provisions of their own. If Southland's position were held applicable to those statutes, "[t]hat would result in the same claim that came into the federal court being not arbitrable but if it was brought in the state court under the state securities law it would be required to be arbitrated." He also noted that the contract simply gave the arbitrator jurisdiction over the instant dispute between the parties and did not specifically give the arbitrator power to enforce an award under the CFIL. "Arbitration is not a good place to enforce important rights set forward in a statute that is complicated."

== Decision ==
The Court postponed ruling on whether it had jurisdiction while it considered the merits of the case. In April 1984 it handed down its 7–2 decision. Chief Justice Warren Burger wrote for the majority, with John Paul Stevens concurring in part and dissenting in part. Sandra Day O'Connor's dissent was joined by William Rehnquist, who had himself written a pointed dissent in Cone.

=== Majority ===
"Contracts to arbitrate are not to be avoided by allowing one party to ignore the contract and resort to the courts," Burger wrote, explaining why the Court chose not to let the state litigation run its course before ruling on the core issue. "For us to delay review of a state judicial decision denying enforcement of the contract to arbitrate until the state court litigation has run its course would defeat the core purpose of a contract to arbitrate." However, the Court lacked jurisdiction to decide the class-certification question at that point in the action.

The next section of the opinion addressed the FAA's applicability to the states. "In enacting § 2 of the federal Act, Congress declared a national policy favoring arbitration and withdrew the power of the states to require a judicial forum for the resolution of claims which the contracting parties agreed to resolve by arbitration," Burger declared. There were only two statutory exemptions: that it was applicable only a written maritime contract or a contract "evidencing a transaction involving commerce" and that the arbitration agreements could be voided only "upon such grounds as exist at law or in equity for the revocation of any contract." Cone had found the FAA to be substantive law that Congress had power to pass under the Commerce Clause. In that case, "[we] expressly stated what was implicit in Prima Paint, i.e. that the substantive law the act created was applicable in both state and federal courts."

A third section addressed the legislative history in response to O'Connor's heavy reliance on it in her dissent. "Although [it] is not without ambiguities, there are strong indications that Congress had in mind something more than making arbitration agreements enforceable only in the federal courts." If the enforceability of arbitration agreements, which common law had long been skeptical of, were a problem only in federal court, he reasoned, Congress would have been less likely to take action. "To confine the scope of the Act to arbitrations sought to be enforced in federal courts would frustrate what we believe Congress intended to be a broad enactment appropriate in scope to meet the large problems Congress was addressing."

If, as O'Connor had argued, the FAA was merely procedural law, why would Congress have limited it to maritime and interstate transactions? "We therefore view the 'involving commerce' requirement in § 2, not as an inexplicable limitation on the power of the federal courts, but as a necessary qualification on a statute intended to apply in state and federal courts." O'Connor's interpretation would lead to forum shopping, Burger wrote:

We are unwilling to attribute to Congress the intent, in drawing on the comprehensive powers of the Commerce Clause, to create a right to enforce an arbitration contract and yet make the right dependent for its enforcement on the particular forum in which it is asserted. And since the overwhelming proportion of all civil litigation in this country is in the state courts, we cannot believe Congress intended to limit the Arbitration Act to disputes subject only to federal court jurisdiction. Such an interpretation would frustrate congressional intent to place "[a]n arbitration agreement . . . upon the same footing as other contracts, where it belongs." In creating a substantive rule applicable in state as well as federal courts, Congress intended to foreclose state legislative attempts to undercut the enforceability of arbitration agreements. We hold that § 31512 of the California Franchise Investment Law violates the Supremacy Clause.

==== Stevens' concurrence ====
"I am persuaded that the intervening developments in the law compel the conclusion that the Court has reached." Stevens began. "I am nevertheless troubled by one aspect of the case that seems to trouble none of my colleagues." He referred to the majority's contention that, had the case been brought in federal court as a diversity case analogous to Prima Paint, the arbitration clause would have been enforceable.

Since the FAA allowed arbitration agreements to be voided under the same principles applicable to contracts generally but did not specifically enumerate what principles might be applicable, "hence it would appear that the judiciary must fashion the limitations as a matter of federal common law." Such a federal common law would likely draw on state precedent and law regarding contract, as indeed the lower federal courts already did when evaluating questions of whether a contract was properly formed in challenges to an arbitration clause. For that reason, he believed state public policy decisions regarding arbitration and its enforcement were entitled to more latitude than that afforded by the majority. A past Supreme Court, in Paramount Famous Lasky Corp. v. United States, had voided arbitration agreements among parties where it found they served to restrain trade.

We should not refuse to exercise independent judgment concerning the conditions under which an arbitration agreement, generally enforceable under the Act, can be held invalid as contrary to public policy simply because the source of the substantive law to which the arbitration agreement attaches is a State, rather than the Federal Government. I find no evidence that Congress intended such a double standard to apply, and I would not lightly impute such an intent to the 1925 Congress which enacted the Arbitration Act.

=== Dissent ===
O'Connor began by noting that the "courts of the United States" language the majority rested its decision on did not specify which courts and that the following two sections specifically refer to federal court. "Today, the Court takes the facial silence of § 2 as a license to declare that state as well as federal courts must apply § 2," she wrote. "The Court's decision is impelled by an understandable desire to encourage the use of arbitration, but it utterly fails to recognize the clear congressional intent underlying the FAA. Congress intended to require federal, not state, courts to respect arbitration agreements."

She traced the majority's misreading to first Erie Railroad v. Tompkins and its holding that the courts could not create substantive law. Then, in Bernhardt, the court found that at least in diversity cases state law was controlling on arbitration clauses. Prima Paint, in her view, resolved concerns that Bernhardt problematized the FAA's constitutionality in such cases, but carefully avoided the question of whether it could be applied to state courts as well.

"Today's case is the first in which this Court has had occasion to determine whether the FAA applies to state court proceedings," O'Connor continued, calling the dictum in Cone "wholly unnecessary to its holding." She broke the majority opinion down into three conclusions, criticizing each in turn. The first, that § 2 of the FAA created substantive rights that state courts were bound to enforce, she called "unquestionably wrong as a matter of statutory construction." The second, that the substantive rights conferred could not be the basis for invoking federal jurisdiction "appears to be an attempt to limit the damage done by the first," and the final requirement that state courts follow procedures similar to those spelled out in the later sections that specifically mentioned federal court was "unnecessary and unwise."

"One rarely finds a legislative history as unambiguous as the FAA's," she wrote. Its sponsor in the House had assured his colleagues the bill's sole goal was to make arbitration agreements enforceable; committee reports and American Bar Association (ABA) briefs on it repeatedly described it as purely procedural. Its drafter had assured two subcommittees that Congress would not "[direct] its own courts ... [to] infringe upon the provinces or prerogatives of the States ... There is no disposition therefore by means of the Federal bludgeon to force an individual State into an unwilling submission to arbitration enforcement."

The hearing transcripts and other records of the FAA's passage also stated clearly that Congress relied on its power to regulate the federal courts and not the Commerce Clause, she pointed out. The House subcommittee's report had explicitly stated that the FAA was procedural and not substantive. "Plainly, a power derived from Congress' Art. III control over federal court jurisdiction would not, by any flight of fancy, permit Congress to control proceedings in state courts," O'Connor concluded. "The foregoing cannot be dismissed as 'ambiguities' in the legislative history." The one sentence Burger had quoted directly for the majority referring to "contracts involving commerce" was definitely resolved by other statements in the legislative history, she added.

Later readings had adhered to that intent. Both Prima Paint and Cone, she reminded the majority, had involved litigation in federal court. "Justice Black would surely be surprised to find either the majority opinion or his dissent in Prima Paint cited by the Court today, as both are." His contention that holding the FAA applicable in state proceedings "would flout the intention of the framers of the Act" had not been challenged in Justice Fortas's majority opinion in that case, she noted.

O'Connor also objected to the majority's insistence that state courts rigorously follow the federal procedures in enforcing the FAA. "Assuming, to the contrary, that § 2 does create a federal right that the state courts must enforce, state courts should nonetheless be allowed, at least in the first instance, to fashion their own procedures for enforcing the right. Unfortunately, the Court seems to direct that the arbitration clause at issue here must be specifically enforced; apparently no other means of enforcement is permissible." Even if she had agreed that the FAA applied in state court, she said, she would still have dissented over that provision alone.

The majority's concern about forum shopping was misplaced, since it had been addressed by the act's creation and earlier interpretation. "Because the FAA makes the federal courts equally accessible to both parties to a dispute, no forum shopping would be possible even if we gave the FAA a construction faithful to the congressional intent." The only issue that had been left unresolved in the original legislation, the question of which law was controlling in a diversity action, had been resolved by Bernhardt, she wrote.

"Today's decision is unfaithful to congressional intent, unnecessary, and, in light of the FAA's antecedents and the intervening contraction of federal power, inexplicable," she concluded. "Although arbitration is a worthy alternative to litigation, today's exercise in judicial revisionism goes too far."

== Aftermath and legacy ==
Upon remand to the Superior Court where the cases originated, the trial judge decided all the class issues. The case proceeded to arbitration, where the arbitrators refused to revisit the judge's ruling. It was then settled out of court.

With the question of the arbitrability of contracts under state law settled, arbitration clauses began appearing in many adhesion contracts offered for employment and consumer services such as credit. That has been described as the "consumerization" of arbitration. Many mandated binding arbitration before disputes even arose.

Since Southland and subsequent decisions held that state courts have no basis other than standard defenses to contract validity for staying arbitration, the states have instead begun to regulate the arbitration process and agreement themselves, particularly through a model statute called the Revised Uniform Arbitration Act (RUAA), which, has as of 2010, been adopted by 13 states and the District of Columbia, with three more states considering it. California now requires that an arbitrator disclose any potential conflicts of interest to parties prior to the arbitration, and New Mexico added to its version of the RUAA a "disabling civil dispute clause" making arbitration agreements voidable in consumer, credit, employment and tenant contracts. Some of them have been challenged in court. One case that did, Green Tree Financial Inc. v. Bazzle, where a South Carolina court had ordered arbitration on a class basis, reached the Supreme Court but the majority did not consider the question, instead considering whether the contract permitted class arbitration to begin with (Rehnquist argued in his dissent that the FAA indeed pre-empted).

== Subsequent jurisprudence ==
In the years following Southland, arbitration cases continued to come to the Supreme Court from state and federal courts. In accordance with Burger's "national policy," it decided many of them in favor of compelling arbitration. The 1985 decision requiring a San Juan-area Chrysler-Plymouth dealer to arbitrate an antitrust claim in Tokyo was strongly criticized and eventually led to the Motor Vehicle Franchise Contract Arbitration Fairness Act of 2001, which forbid contracts between automobile manufacturers and dealers from including pre-dispute arbitration clauses. It was the first time Congress had enacted an exemption to the FAA.

California's courts generated two more cases addressing the preemption issue. Perry v. Thomas, in 1987, overturned the state statute allowing a wage collection to proceed regardless of an arbitration agreement. O'Connor and Stevens dissented. Both reiterated their previous opinions and incorporated the others, O'Connor citing Stevens' belief that states should be entitled to restrict some arbitrations as a matter of public policy as a reason she would have upheld the California statute even if she agreed the FAA was applicable to state-level actions. In Volt Information Sciences v. Stanford University, the Court unanimously declined to compel arbitration under the FAA since the contract between the parties agreed that it would be governed by California law, which limited the arbitrable issues.

=== Allied-Bruce Terminix Cos. v. Dobson ===
State judges and many commentators had come to agree with O'Connor that Southland had been wrongly decided, and looked for an opportunity to overturn it. In the early 1990s they appeared to have it with a case that also involved a group of individuals against the local branch of a multistate corporation, where state law appeared to make the issue non-arbitrable. The action was brought by an Alabama homeowner against Terminix, the previous homeowner's exterminator, after they had found the newly purchased house heavily infested with termites despite the previous owner's assurances that it was free of them.

Terminix tried to stay the litigation citing the arbitration clause in its contract with the previous owner, who had also become plaintiffs. Alabama's Supreme Court ruled that Southland didn't apply since it was a purely local transaction between a homeowner and the local branch of Terminix. After certiorari was granted, 20 state attorneys general filed amici briefs calling for the court to take the occasion to overturn Southland.

When the decision was handed down, as Allied-Bruce Terminix Cos. v. Dobson, a 7-2 Court not only declined to do so but also expanded the FAA's reach further, to include transactions such as the one under review, since they affected interstate commerce. Justice Stephen Breyer, writing for the majority, read the use of "involving" to be equivalent to "affecting," a word that he said indicated congressional intent for the statute to have the widest possible reach. Since nothing had changed since Southland, they declined to overturn it.

O'Connor voted with the majority this time, writing in a separate concurrence that although her opinion had not changed since her Southland dissent a decade before, stare decisis dictated that she uphold that case since too many contracts would be voided if it was overturned. Two justices appointed to the Court in the meantime, Antonin Scalia and Clarence Thomas, dissented. Scalia, noting that he had joined majorities in Perry and Volt, which relied on Southland, said that nevertheless he felt that case had been wrongly decided and, with the question of FAA preemption before the Court again, he voted to overturn it, not seeing stare decisis as an impediment. "I shall not in the future dissent from judgments that rest on Southland. I will, however, stand ready to join four other Justices in overruling it, since Southland will not become more correct over time, [and] the course of future lawmaking seems unlikely to be affected by its existence."

==== Thomas's dissent ====
Thomas filed a longer dissent critiquing the majority opinion in Southland and expanding on O'Connor's dissent in that case. "In my view, the Federal Arbitration Act (FAA) does not apply in state courts," he began. As Stevens had in Perry, he noted the 35 years between the act's passage and the first suggestion (in Robert Lawrence) that it applied in state courts as well. "The explanation for this delay is simple: The statute that Congress enacted actually applies only in federal courts."

He reviewed the act's passage, noting sources, including a New York Court of Appeals interpretation by Benjamin Cardozo of the state statute the FAA was modeled on, that described it as purely procedural. An early law review article read it as not presuming to apply to state courts, although arguing it could. "Indeed, to judge from the reported cases, it appears that no state court was even asked to enforce the statute for many years after the passage of the FAA."

Federal courts, he noted, had refused to apply state arbitration statutes in federal cases to which the FAA did not apply, because it was not considered substantive. "In short, state arbitration statutes prescribed rules for the state courts, and the FAA prescribed rules for the federal courts." Arbitration clauses, Thomas wrote, were arguably forum selection, considered procedural rather than substantive. "And if a contractual provision deals purely with matters of judicial procedure, one might well conclude that questions about whether and how it will be enforced also relate to procedure."

Like O'Connor, he read the text of the FAA closely and found no implied authority over the states. "[T]he FAA treats arbitration simply as one means of resolving disputes that lie within the jurisdiction of the federal courts; it makes clear that the breach of a covered arbitration agreement does not itself provide any independent basis for such jurisdiction. Even the Southland majority was forced to acknowledge this point...." That majority, according Thomas, had offered only one real response: its argument that Congress would have extended it to all contracts if it meant for the FAA to be procedural. He offered the possibility that Congress may have instead believed "there was no federal interest in doing so unless interstate commerce or maritime transactions were involved. This conclusion is far more plausible...."

Along with Stevens and Scalia, he echoed O'Connor's point that even if the FAA unambiguously applied to state courts it did not follow that it imposed the same procedural requirements on them. Both statutory and case law in Alabama were hostile to predispute arbitration agreements, and he felt the Court should defer to the public policy goals of the legislature and courts in that state. A provision barring specific enforcement of such arbitration agreements seemed to provide adequate grounds for a stay, he wrote.

He joined Scalia in dismissing O'Connor's stare decisis concerns.

I see no reason to think that the costs of overruling Southland are unacceptably high. Certainly no reliance interests are involved in cases like the present one, where the applicability of the FAA was not within the contemplation of the parties at the time of contracting. In many other cases, moreover, the parties will simply comply with their arbitration agreement, either on the theory that they should live up to their promises or on the theory that arbitration is the cheapest and best way of resolving their dispute. In a fair number of the remaining cases, the party seeking to enforce an arbitration agreement will be able to get into federal court, where the FAA will apply. And even if access to federal court is impossible (because § 2 creates no independent basis for federal-question jurisdiction), many cases will arise in States whose own law largely parallels the FAA.

Even if stare decisis applied, Thomas concluded, it would not cover the procedural requirements of the act since the Court had never formally held that those applied to the states as well.

Scalia has since joined many majorities upholding arbitration clauses in contracts under state law, in one case writing an holding that an arbitrator must be the first to decide whether a contract was illegal under state law. Thomas was the lone dissenter in that case, and in another California case the next year where the majority ruled that state law providing for administrative dispute resolution was also pre-empted by the FAA. His dissents in those cases have consisted of a single paragraph referencing his Terminix dissent and its progeny.

== Analysis and commentary ==
O'Connor, Scalia, and Thomas have not been the only critics of Southland and its take on Congress's intent in passing the FAA. It has been called "remarkable for its preemption holding that blatantly ignores legislative intent," "extraordinarily disingenuous" and "painfully misleading."

Margaret Moses, an international arbitration scholar at Loyola University Chicago School of Law, has traced Southland to a series of misreadings in its predecessor decisions that make the original FAA "unrecognizable" in its current judicial incarnation. It began with the dilemma created by the twin precedents of Erie Railroad, which overruled Swift v. Tyson by holding that federal courts had to apply the state law of the state in which it sat in diversity cases, and Guaranty Trust Co. v. York, which clarified Erie Railroad with the "outcome-determinative" requirement that if the federal law would produce a different outcome than state law, state law must be applied. Bernhardt had raised that question, but the Court avoided it by holding that an employment contract, even across state lines, did not constitute interstate commerce for FAA purposes, while noting that the outcome-determinative test would have produced the same result.

Prima Paint forced the Court to confront the issue directly, when a New Jersey company resisted a Maryland company's demand for a claim of misrepresentation to be arbitrated. If they applied the outcome-determinative test, according to Moses, the justices would render the FAA ineffective at its intended purpose. The Court could have ruled the FAA purely procedural following a recent decision, Hanna v. Plumer, but was concerned about Congress making rules affecting contracts, traditionally primarily a matter for the states. So, it chose to follow the Second Circuit decision in Robert Lawrence by relying on the Dormant Commerce Clause as grounding its reading of the FAA. This, she wrote, conflicted with the statute's legislative history, which repeatedly refers to it as a purely procedural measure. "In Prima Paint, the Court reached a pragmatic result but used an unfortunate method to get there."

In addition, she argued, the court failed to limit the scope of the decision, which set the stage for Justice William J. Brennan, Jr. to assert in dicta in Cone both that the FAA made arbitration a national policy and that it applied to the state courts, without support for either assertion. Again, the legislative history of the act showed that it had been meant merely to allow federal courts to permit arbitration. "The so-called policy favoring arbitration appears to be one created by the judiciary out of whole cloth," Moses observed. It may have arisen from the more explicit assertion of a national policy favoring labor arbitration, which the Court cited in Mitsubish Motors later."

As a result of the Cone dicta, the appellees in Southland stipulated that the FAA applied to the states and did not argue the point much either in their brief or orally. The majority, Moses continued, repeated the error of Prima Paint' in grounding the FAA in the Commerce Clause. Burger's interpretation of the language that limited the covered contracts to maritime or commercial agreements was not only speculative but also wrong. That language had been added in an amendment offered by Senator Thomas J. Walsh, whose intent was to limit the scope of the act, not expand it, so it could not be applied to employment and insurance contracts. The single reference to the Commerce Clause as empowering Congress was at the end of a memo prepared by the FAA's drafter, intended, Moses believes, as a "fallback position" should the FAA be found outside the scope of Congress's powers to regulate federal courts.

David Schwartz of Wisconsin Law School, author of an amicus filed in Bazzle, has argued that the reach Southland gives the FAA is unconstitutional even if it were clearly intended to apply to state courts "and no one has noticed." He joins with the dissenting justices and other critics in finding it "properly seen as procedural when viewed from any angle." To Schwartz, it also constitutes a federally mandated restructuring of state courts. "The proper constitutional solution is not to change a state's neutral rule of judicial administration, but to make sure that a federal forum is available to hear the claim (and require that the state dismiss the federal claim for lack of appropriate jurisdiction)."

Some commentators have defended the decision. Prominent among them has been Christopher Drahozal of Kansas, who has argued the legislative history indeed supports its application to state courts as a secondary purpose. "The vast majority of statements in the legislative history relied on by commentators to criticize the Southland holding," he wrote, "state simply that the FAA applies in federal court, not that it applies only in federal court." While he is also critical of the way Burger made the argument and agrees there are ambiguities in the record, he believes that the Court read it correctly.

Schwartz wrote that Drahozal's analysis is "thought-provoking" but incorrect. Moses says that while Drahozal's argument has some points, "he may continue to swim upstream on this point without much scholarly company," and she believes that he rests too much on a statement in the drafter's memo saying its secondary purpose is make arbitration agreements enforceable in federal courts, which ignores many explicit statements that it was not intended to.

== See also ==
- List of United States Supreme Court cases, volume 465
