= Moses H. Cone Memorial Hospital v. Mercury Construction Corp. =

1983 U.S. Supreme Court arbitration-law case

Moses Cone Mem. Hosp. v. Mercury Constr. Corp.
- Supreme Court of the United States

Argued November 2, 1982 Decided February 23, 1983
- Full case name: Moses H. Cone Memorial Hospital v. Mercury Constr. Corp.
- Citations: 460 U.S. 1 (more) 103 S. Ct. 927, 74 L. Ed. 2d 765

Case history
- Prior: 80 CvS. 6787, North Carolina General Court of Justice, Greensboro Division; 656 F.2d 933 (4th Cir. 1981)

Holding
- District Court stay of petition seeking to compel arbitration pending resolution of action in state court was properly appealable as final since its sole purpose and effect were the surrender of jurisdiction to a state court; stay itself was improper abstention since Colorado River exceptional circumstances did not apply. Fourth Circuit affirmed.

Court membership
- Chief Justice Warren E. Burger Associate Justices William J. Brennan Jr. · Byron White; Thurgood Marshall · Harry Blackmun; Lewis F. Powell Jr. · William Rehnquist; John P. Stevens · Sandra Day O'Connor

Case opinions
- Majority: Brennan, joined by White, Marshall, Blackmun, Powell, Stevens
- Dissent: Rehnquist, joined by Burger, O'Connor

Laws applied
- Federal Arbitration Act, Federal Rules of Civil Procedure

Moses H. Cone Memorial Hospital v. Mercury Construction Corp., 460 U.S. 1 (1983), commonly cited as Moses Cone or Cone Hospital, is a United States Supreme Court decision concerning civil procedure, specifically the abstention doctrine, as it applies to enforcing an arbitration clause in a diversity case. By a 6–3 margin, the justices resolved a complicated construction dispute by ruling that a North Carolina hospital had to arbitrate a claim against the Alabama-based company it had hired to build a new wing, even though it meant that it could not consolidate it with ongoing litigation it had brought in state court against the contractor and architect.

Justice William Brennan wrote for the majority that a district court's stay of the contractor's petition to compel arbitration was an "abuse of discretion". It had not properly applied the Court's prior ruling in Colorado River Water Conservation District v. United States. Since the net effect of the stay was to force the contractor to litigate in state court, Mercury's appeal to the Fourth Circuit was proper, and the appeals court properly reversed the stay. Since the contract was covered by the Federal Arbitration Act (FAA), the hospital had no way to avoid arbitration, which the contractor could not be assured of getting under existing state law.

William Rehnquist's dissent, joined by Chief Justice Warren E. Burger and Sandra Day O'Connor, accused the majority of misreading the case in order to get the contractor into arbitration. He argued that another case, Will v. Calvert Fire Insurance Co., permitted the district court's action, which in any case was routine docket management practiced by many district judges.

While arbitration was not the main issue in the case, it had a profound effect on future cases concerning the FAA. Two of Brennan's passing dicta, that the FAA applied to actions in state court and that it enacted a national policy in favor of arbitration, became the central holdings of Southland Corp. v. Keating the following year, a case from which O'Connor and Rehnquist dissented. Those holdings have been challenged, even by some other justices, as fundamentally at odds with the language and legislative history of the FAA, even as the Court has continued to expand its scope since then.

== Source of the dispute ==
In 1975 Moses H. Cone Memorial Hospital in Greensboro, North Carolina, contracted with Mercury to build a new wing. The contract, drafted by the hospital's attorneys, vested most dispute resolution authority, relating to aesthetic matters, in the project's architect, J.N. Pease Associates of Charlotte, with the opportunity to go to arbitration if the architect did not rule on the dispute within ten days of the evidence being presented, or if they disagreed with its decision.

The project was scheduled to completed by October 1977, but due to change orders and some other problems the hospital and Mercury agreed on a two-year extension, provided Mercury withhold its claim for delay and impact costs until after the work was done. By February 1979 the wing was substantially complete, except for some punch list items.

In January 1980, Mercury submitted its claim for up to $2 million in additional costs to the architect. Over the next several months, Mercury and the architect went over the claim, apparently with the goal of reducing it. The hospital contended later it was unaware of these negotiations until April of that year, and that the architect exceeded its contractual powers by delaying and allowing the claims to be presented after completion. By the time it was aware, the claim had been reduced to $600,000–1.2 million.

When it was presented with the claim, the hospital asked for time to have its own expert review it. Mercury, the hospital and the architect met in August in Birmingham, Alabama. Mercury offered the hospital access to its files. The hospital asked that the copies be mailed to its expert, who was unable to attend the meeting due to a scheduling conflict. The parties agreed to meet again in October.

== Litigation ==
A week before that meeting, Mercury's lawyer called the hospital's lawyer to confirm the meeting date. The hospital's lawyer said he would be able to do so the next day. Instead, when he called, it was to inform Mercury's lawyer that the hospital did not intend to pay as its expert found that none of the delays were its fault and was filing for a declaratory judgment in North Carolina state court to the effect that it did not have to arbitrate and owed Mercury nothing (and that even if it did, the architect would owe the hospital the judgment).

The hospital filed the next morning in Guilford County Superior Court, naming Mercury and the architect as defendants, charging negligence and breach of contract, but not alleging a conspiracy between the two. It said that Mercury had, through its delays, forfeited any right to arbitration. Mercury filed a demand for arbitration the following day. A week later, the hospital filed ex parte in state court for an injunction, which it received, barring Mercury from proceeding with arbitration. Mercury objected and two weeks later the injunction was lifted.

In the interim it had initiated an action in the Middle District of North Carolina federal court to compel the hospital to arbitrate under the Federal Arbitration Act and asking that the state court action be removed to federal court. The hospital responded by asking for the case to be removed back to state court, and that the federal case be stayed pending resolution of the state court action. The district court agreed, finding that there was not diversity and that the state court action was similar enough to the action before it.

=== Appeal ===
Mercury filed for an interlocutory appeal with the Fourth Circuit. Citing the circuit rule that such appeals are permitted when the practical effect of the district court's ruling is to put an end to the action, it decided to hear the case. An en banc panel of nine judges heard arguments in June 1981 and ruled in Mercury's favor two months later.

Judge Donald S. Russell wrote for a majority of seven that Mercury was entitled to its arbitration order based on a variety of precedents. The action did not meet the FAA's requirement that arbitration can be avoided only through standard defenses to contract formation, nor had previous appeals courts allowed pending state-court action to prevail. Federal law was controlling, overriding North Carolina law that held contracts such as the one between Mercury and the hospital not to be in interstate commerce and thus under the domain of state law, which in this case would have allowed the hospital to avoid arbitration. He called the hospital's contention that its designation of the architect, also based in North Carolina, as the dispute-resolution authority and the latter's status as a defendant in its lawsuit "a novel theory for avoiding arbitration".

He distinguished the case from Will v. Calvert Fire Ins. Co., in which the Supreme Court had sustained a federal court's abstention in favor of a state court, by saying there were no exceptional circumstances. In that case, the state action had long preceded the federal action, and unlike Colorado River the parties were few and located near each other. He dismissed the hospital's claim that Mercury's petition for an arbitration order was a delaying tactic, calling the hospital's behavior more clearly contrived.

Nor was he moved by the hospital's desire to avoid piecemeal litigation, part of the justification for Colorado River. "Even assuming there is some controversy between the Hospital and the Architect, to which Mercury is not a party," Russell wrote, "why should Mercury be delayed in its right to a prompt resolution by arbitration, without the expense of long and protracted litigation, as the parties had solemnly agreed, because of some controversy between the Hospital and its Architect? Such a maneuver plainly prejudiced Mercury in its right to arbitration under the Federal Act." He also doubted the hospital's claim that Mercury faced no greater burden pursuing arbitration in state court, since while North Carolina's arbitration law was similar to the federal statute, it had rarely been interpreted by that state's courts. "Until a statute has been given an authoritative judicial construction by the enacting state's own courts, its application and reach are uncertain."

The two dissenting judges were H. Emory Widener Jr. and Kenneth Keller Hall. They pointed out that existing case law in other circuits had required that state courts rule on the arbitrability of issues under dispute. "The action of the district court is nothing more nor less than the exercising of control of its own docket, in which matter it should be allowed rather wide latitude instead of being strictly circumscribed as the majority would have it", Widener wrote. He defended the North Carolina courts, quoting the Supreme Court in Sumner v. Mata to the effect that state judges were also required to swear to uphold the Constitution and should be presumed capable of doing so despite differences of interpretation.

He concluded by casting doubt on the majority's imputation that the hospital had been manipulating the system to avoid arbitration. It seemed a more reasonable conclusion to Widener that the hospital, distrusting both its architect and contractor, had decided it was better to have all the parties in one forum. Accusing the majority of "bootstrap logic", he said "The treacherous motives attributed to these acts is more likely a conjecture stemming from the majority's hindsight than the reasoned product of the Hospital's foresight."

== Before the Court ==
The Court granted certiorari to hear the case due to the procedural issues involved. Its decision to hear the case allowed the consideration of a third issue: was the district court's stay properly appealable? After the 1981 term had intervened, it heard oral arguments on the abstention, appealability and arbitrability questions in November 1982.

Jack Floyd, arguing for the hospital, called Mercury's petition for an arbitration order "curious". He reiterated that the contract stipulated that North Carolina law applied to it, and that other circuits faced with similar questions had ruled state arbitration law governed in that situation. There were always exceptions, he added. "To say 'I agree to arbitrate' does not mean that I agree to arbitrate every conceivable dispute." Mercury had brought its claim beyond the original time frame of five years from the execution of the contract, so the hospital was not bound to arbitrate that.

Confronted with the issue of whether there would be a different outcome in federal court, since the federal court would have to follow North Carolina law as well, he maintained that "Mercury has no right to select its court". The stay should not have been appealed, he said, since Mercury could have gone back to district court at any time if it felt the state court proceeding was not fair and asked that the stay be lifted. As to abstention, he argued that "the circumstances compelled stay more clearly" than they had in Colorado River or Will.

"Generally," A.H. Gaede said for Mercury, "the federal courts are far more familiar with the interpretation and enforcement of the Federal Arbitration Act." He reiterated the facts of the case — his client had been asked to withhold its claims until after completion of the project, and the architect had concluded they were entitled to at least some of them. Only after the hospital had told them of its intention to sue did they have standing to request an arbitration order.

As to the finality of the stay, he noted that the district court had more evidence in its possession to make a determination of arbitrability than the state court did. Yet, by ruling that the action was to be stayed not just pending a state court determination of arbitrability but until the final resolution of the state court action, "the order that was entered by the district court effectively stopped that case forever". Even if it reconsidered its stay in the face of inaction by the state court, Mercury had been denied the speedy resolution of its demand for arbitration as guaranteed in the FAA.

In concluding he addressed the stay itself. "I think that what Mr. Floyd and the hospital are suggesting here turns Colorado River upside down," he said. "What the hospital is really arguing, we think, is that the mere fact of the prior filing of the case in the state court system requires that the case be referred back to the state court system." The facts of the cases were totally different, he continued. Colorado River had a federal statute explicitly requiring state courts to hear cases like the one at issue, actual property interests at stake, and the practical problem of multiple defendants over a large area.

== Decision ==
Two months later, in February 1983, the Court announced its decision. Justice William J. Brennan Jr. wrote for himself and justices Blackmun, Marshall, Powell, Stevens and White that Mercury was entitled to arbitrate and the district court, by staying the request, had "abused its discretion." William Rehnquist dissented, along with Chief Justice Warren Burger and Sandra Day O'Connor. His opinion considered the district court's stay to have been entirely proper and unappealable.

=== Majority ===
Brennan first considered the appealability question. He looked to Idlewild Liquor Corp. v. Epstein, a 1962 decision where the Court had upheld an appellate ruling that a stay was a final action since it effectively put the plaintiff in that case out of court. "Here, the argument for finality of the District Court's order is even clearer ... this stay order amounts to a dismissal of the suit".

It also came under two of the three exceptions to the finality rule laid out in Cohen v. Beneficial Industrial Loan Corp.. The stay had resolved an important issue completely separate from the merits of the case, since once the state court had decided the arbitrability question a federal court would be bound by it as res judicata. Had it not been appealed then, the stay would have thus been entirely unreviewable, another of the Cohen criteria.

The justice agreed with the hospital that the other criterion was not met, that the decision did not conclusively determine the disputed question. "But this is true only in the technical sense that every order short of a final decree is subject to reopening at the discretion of the district judge", Brennan responded. He doubted that the district judge did not expect all the issues to be resolved in state court.

Having settled that question, Brennan began a lengthy discussion of the abstention issue. He revisited the Colorado River opinion he had written, emphasizing its reliance on "wise judicial administration". Here he clarified that "the decision whether to dismiss a federal action because of parallel state court litigation does not rest on a mechanical checklist, but on a careful balancing of the important factors as they apply in a given case, with the balance heavily weighted in favor of the exercise of jurisdiction."

The hospital had been wrong in its claim that Will allowed the stay, according to Brennan, because it relied on Rehnquist's plurality opinion in that case, which had the support of only three other justices. On remand, the appeals court had relied on Blackmun's concurrence, which taken along with Brennan's own dissent for the four justices in that case required that the appellate court allow the district court to decide based on Colorado River as it was originally decided, whether the same exceptional circumstances existed. Therefore Colorado River was still controlling. Will also differed from the instant case in that it did not involve a mandamus writ, Brennan observed.

Applying Colorado River directly, Brennan found "it is clear that there was no showing of the requisite exceptional circumstances to justify the District Court's stay". The hospital had conceded that there was no res or property interest at stake, nor was federal court a less convenient forum. "The remaining factors—avoidance of piecemeal litigation, and the order in which jurisdiction was obtained by the concurrent forums—far from supporting the stay, actually counsel against it."

The district court could decide the dispute was not arbitrable, Brennan observed, which would put all the parties in state court as the hospital hoped. If it had to be arbitrated, then it would be arbitrated. "But neither of those two outcomes depends at all on which court decides the question of arbitrability" which was separate in any event from the underlying issues.

It did not matter that the hospital had filed in state court first, the justice said, as Mercury could not, under the FAA, arbitrate until the other party had declined to do so, and it had not been aware of the hospital's intent to litigate and not arbitrate until the night before the papers had been filed. Thus it could not possibly have filed first, a situation further complicated by the injunction briefly in place. Calling the hospital's reading of Colorado River "too mechanical", Brennan also noted that the federal action had been closer to resolution than the state action.

"This refusal to proceed was plainly erroneous in view of Congress' clear intent, in the Arbitration Act, to move the parties to an arbitrable dispute out of court and into arbitration as quickly and easily as possible", Brennan began as he addressed the last of the three questions. "Federal law in the terms of the Arbitration Act governs that issue in either state or federal court ... [It] is a congressional declaration of a liberal federal policy favoring arbitration agreements". For that reason, courts should resolve any doubts about arbitrability in favor of arbitration, he wrote. Among those were the lack of clarity as to whether state courts, bound by the FAA as they might be to enforce stays, were equally bound to compel arbitration.

=== Dissent ===
"In its zeal to provide arbitration for a party it thinks deserving," Rehnquist began, "the Court has made an exception to established rules of procedure. The Court's attempt to cast the District Court's decision as a final judgment fails to do justice to the meaning of the word 'final,' to the Act of Congress that limits the jurisdiction of the courts of appeals, or to the district judges who administer the laws in the first instance."

He observed that a state court finding that the dispute was not arbitrable would have been binding on a federal court as res judicata whether or not the stay had been granted, if the state court action had concluded first. Stays could occur for a number of reasons, he added–a judge may want a short recess, or a longer period in order that the parties could prepare for additional briefs or argument. Yet the possibility that a state court hearing the same case might render a judgment in the meantime "did not magically change that character of the order the District Judge entered in this case."

The decision amounted to "an unwarranted limitation upon the power of district courts to control their own cases", Rehnquist wrote. He felt it would invite further interlocutory appeals "in cases which the ingenuity of counsel disappointed by a district court's ruling can analogize to this one." In 1978's Coopers & Lybrand v. Livesay, he noted, the Court had upheld the decertification of a class by a district court over the respondent's objection that it effectively ended their case since there was no longer enough economic incentive for a single plaintiff to continue as a practical matter. The justices had unanimously agreed that that was true but held that that circumstance did not justify creating an exception to the rule.

After justifying the stay, he attacked the holding that it was appealable. "The Court has not given any sound, principled justification for permitting the Court of Appeals to thrust itself into the trial process in this case". Idlewild was not controlling since the circumstances had been no pending state legislation in that case, and thus Mercury was in a better position than Idlewild had been. He also felt Coopers & Lybrand complicated Idlewild considerably.

"Furthermore, I am not as certain as is the Court that, by staying this case, the District Court resolved 'an important issue,'" Rehnquist continued. "An issue should not be deemed 'important' for these purposes simply because the court of appeals or this Court thinks the appellant should prevail." He said the stay could be seen as final only if one believed, as the majority did not, that there was a possibility the state court might not decide the arbitrability issue correctly.

Lastly he noted that the majority was following the appeals court in deciding the case on an issue the district court had not considered, overstepping the bounds of appellate jurisdiction:

I am disturbed, however, that the Court has sanctioned an extraordinary departure from the usual and accepted course of judicial proceedings by affirming the Court of Appeals decision on an issue that was not decided in the District Court ... [The law] does not grant the courts of appeals authority to constitute themselves as trial courts. Section 4 of the Arbitration Act gives the Hospital a right to a jury trial. By deciding that there were no disputed issues of fact, the Court of Appeals seems to have decided a motion for summary judgment that was not before it. This is the kind of issue that district judges decide every day in the ordinary course of business. It is not the kind of issue that courts of appeals determine ... There was no reason to believe that the District Court would not have acted promptly to resolve the dispute on the merits after being reversed on the stay. That judges of a court of appeals believe they know how a case should be decided is no reason for them to substitute their own judgment for that of a district judge without regard to the normal course of appellate procedure.

== Subsequent jurisprudence ==
Brennan's dicta that the FAA applied to state court proceedings and made it national policy to encourage arbitration became the central holdings of Burger's majority opinion the next term in Southland Corp. v. Keating in which the former question was the main issue of the case. Since then the Court has widened the scope of the FAA to cover arbitration of many issues.

The 1984 term brought another arbitration case resting on Cone, Dean Witter Reynolds Inc. v. Byrd. A Southern California dentist had brought federal and state securities fraud claims against the brokerage. The trial court denied the defense motion to arbitrate the state-law claims, and the Ninth Circuit upheld since the two actions were based on the same set of facts. On appeal, Thurgood Marshall wrote for a unanimous Court that, as in Cone, Congress's intent to promote arbitration prevailed over the respondent's desire to avoid bifurcated dispute resolution.

In Volt Information Sciences, Inc. v. Board of Trustees of Leland Stanford Junior Univ., a few years later, the Court upheld a California appeals court's finding that the contract was governed by state arbitration law which permitted a court to stay arbitration pending the resolution of litigation. Rehnquist wrote for a majority of six that Cone's declaration of a policy favoring arbitration did not also encompass a specific set of arbitral rules. Brennan, in dissent joined by Stevens, felt that declaration was broad enough to encompass cases where it was not clear that the parties intended to have the case under state law.

In the 1996 case Quackenbush v. Allstate Ins. Co., the justices were asked to consider whether a remand in an abstention case was as effectively final as the stay had been in Cone. O'Connor wrote for a unanimous Court that it was, upholding the Ninth Circuit. Her opinion also admitted that Cone partially overruled the earlier Thermtron Products, Inc. v. Hermansdorfer.

The appeals courts have taken the decision as a clarification and extension of the Colorado River doctrine, sometimes referring to it as the Colorado River-Moses Cone doctrine, governing the "exceptional circumstances" under which a federal district court may decline jurisdiction in the face of parallel state litigation. The individual circuits have applied it differently, at least when reviewing declaratory judgments. Its holding that a district court's stay is final when the sole effect is to surrender jurisdiction to a state court has become precedent. State and federal appeals courts have also cited its holding that doubts about arbitrability should be resolved in favor of arbitration, and that the degree of progress of an action should be considered as much as whether the state or federal action was filed first. In 1998 the Eleventh Circuit similarly vacated a district court dismissal in favor of a parallel state action to compel arbitration in a case where it noted the strong similarities save for less ambiguity about state law.

== Analysis and commentary ==
Linda Hirshman of Chicago-Kent College of Law called Cone the first case of the Second Arbitration Trilogy, alluding to the Steelworkers' Trilogy of cases in the 1930s that established arbitration as the preferred dispute resolution tool in industrial relations. Together with Southland and Byrd, they completed a federalization of arbitration law.

Margaret Moses of Loyola University Chicago School of Law finds Cone a key error along the road to Southland's holding that the FAA applies to state courts, a holding she finds in explicit contradiction to the act's legislative history. In the key 1967 arbitration case Prima Paint Corp. v. Flood & Conklin Mfg. Co., which held that the validity of contracts themselves was to be determined by the arbitrator in the first instance unless the arbitration clause itself was at issue, the Court had had to resolve a conflict over the statute created in the years since its passage when Erie Railroad Co. v. Tompkins prohibited federal courts from applying federal common law and Guaranty Trust Co. v. York distinguished between procedural and substantive law. Federal courts could not apply the latter, which the FAA seemed to be, to the states in diversity cases like Prima Paint. If they could not, it seemed to frustrate the act's purpose in promoting the use of arbitration.

The Court solved that problem by relying on the reasoning of a Second Circuit decision, Robert Lawrence Co. v. Devonshire Fabrics, which had found the FAA grounded not in Congress's Article I powers to regulate federal courts but the Dormant Commerce Clause. While she called that decision "pragmatic", she criticized Prima Paint for failing to limit its scope. As a result, Brennan was able to make his unsupported assertions in his Cone dicta, which the appellees preparing for Southland took as a settled matter of law and didn't contest much in their arguments, leading to an erroneous holding in that case.

== See also ==
- List of United States Supreme Court cases, volume 460
