= Churning (finance) =

Churning is the practice of executing trades for an investment account by a salesperson or broker in order to generate commission from the account. It is a breach of securities law in many jurisdictions, and it is generally actionable by the account holder for the return of the commissions paid, and any losses occasioned by the broker's choice of stocks.

Courts generally look at the turnover of an investment account, or the number of times the investment capital has been re-invested during a year. For example, an actively traded mutual fund typically turns over its assets every six to twenty-four months, whereas in churning cases, an investor's assets may be traded monthly or more, generating high commissions that can quickly reduce the account's value.

Critics of the practice of paying brokers commissions for managing investment accounts point to churning as one of the indicators that the brokerage system indirectly encourages such behavior by brokers to the detriment of investors. Accounts invested in securities with steady returns and little price fluctuation generate no commissions, and brokers are therefore not encouraged to invest their client's money in such investments.

Frequent trading in fee-based accounts is not an example of churning, since no commissions are generated in those transactions. However, the practice of putting clients who trade infrequently into a fee-based brokerage account is known as "reverse churning", since clients are charged fees in accounts with few if any transactions.

== See also ==
- Foreign exchange fraud
- Securities fraud
- Microcap stock fraud
