= Holding (law) =

A holding is a court's determination of a matter of law based on the issue presented in the particular case. In other words: under this law, with these facts, this is the result. It is the same as a 'decision' made by the judge; however "decision" can also refer to the judge's entire opinion, containing, for example, a discussion of facts, issues, and law as well as the holding. The holding is the "legal principle to be drawn from the opinion (decision) of the court".

== Appellate review ==
"The word 'holding' is indefinite and may refer to a trial ruling of the court upon evidence or other questions presented during the trial. Of course, no oral statement made by the court at the close of a trial, nor any written memorandum opinion filed, may be assigned as error on appeal, as the final decision in a law action is the judgment signed, based upon the court's findings of fact and conclusions of law."

== See also ==
- Ratio decidendi
- Obiter dictum (almost always shortened to dictum or, when plural, dicta in legal contexts; not to be confused with the broader meaning of dictum outside of a legal context - one of authority, as opposed to persuasiveness [at best] without being binding)
