= Legislative history =

Materials generated as legislation is drafted and enacted

Legislative history includes any of various materials generated in the course of creating legislation, such as committee reports, analysis by legislative counsel, committee hearings, floor debates, and histories of actions taken. Legislative history is used for discovering sources of information about a legislature's intent in enacting a law, although jurists disagree widely about the extent (if any) to which a statute's legislative history has bearing on the meaning of its text.

== Sweden ==
Swedish courts frequently avail themselves of the legislative history (Swedish: förarbeten, literally "travaux préparatoires") in interpreting the law. Valid documents of legislative history are often taken to be official government reports, the bills (proposition) presented by the Swedish government before the Riksdag, statements made by the responsible minister at the government session at which the bill was adopted (regeringssammanträde), the report on the bill by the relevant Riksdag committee (utskottsbetänkande), and statements made by the responsible minister during the debate in the Riksdag.

== United Kingdom ==
Prior to 1993, looking into the parliamentary records to aid interpretation would have been perceived as a breach of parliamentary privilege, but that year, the House of Lords ruled in Pepper v Hart [1993] AC 593 that it could do so in specific circumstances.

== United States ==
Whether and to what extent courts should use legislative history when deciding cases is disputed in the United States. Textualists reject any use of legislative history, but intentionalists and purposivists look to legislative history to determine the legislative intent or the goals of the law, respectively. Many legal scholars believe that consulting legislative history is acceptable only when the text of the law is ambiguous.

Judge Alex Kozinski summed up the concerns as follows:

1. The two Houses and the President agree on the text of statutes, not on committee reports or floor statements. To give substantive effect to this flotsam and jetsam of the legislative process is to short-circuit the constitutional scheme for making law.
2. Collective intent is an oxymoron. Congress is not a thinking entity; it is a group of individuals, each of whom may or may not have an "intent" as to any particular provision of the statute. But to look for congressional intent is to engage in anthropomorphism--to search for something that cannot be found because it does not exist.
3. Even if there were such a thing as congressional intent, and even if it could be divined, it wouldn't matter. What matters is what Congress does, not what it intends to do. So, in our hypothetical case, it matters not that Congress intended to delete section 666 from the crime bill; what matters is what it did, and what it did was to pass the bill with the section included.
4. Even if the other obstacles could be overcome, reliance on legislative history actually makes statutes more difficult to interpret by casting doubt on otherwise clear language. This makes it much more difficult for people to conform their conduct to the law, as no one can tell what the law is until a court has weighed the language, the legislative history, the policy considerations, and other relevant information. This increases litigation costs and undermines the rule of law.
5. Legislative history is often contradictory, giving courts a chance to pick and choose those bits which support the result the judges want to reach. In Judge Leventhal's immortal phrase, consulting legislative history is like "looking over a crowd of people and picking out your friends." n24 This shifts power from the Congress and the President--who, after all, are charged with writing the laws--to unelected judges. The more sources a court can consult in deciding how to interpret a statute, the more likely the interpretation will reflect the policy judgments of the judges and not that of the political branches.
6. Allowing legislative history to do work that should be done by statutory language leads to political unaccountability. Members of Congress who reach an impasse can agree on murky language, then salt the legislative record with clues and hints hoping to shift the process of interpretation their way. Elected officials can thus achieve substantive results without having to take the political responsibility that would come from passing clear-cut statutory language.
7. Shifting important policy judgments to the courts brings the judiciary into disrepute and undermines the notion that judges apply the law objectively. When the public comes to understand that judges are simply unelected, life-tenured bureaucrats dressed in black, making policy decisions just like other government officials, the moral authority of the courts will be seriously undermined and popular obeisance to the courts' constitutional judgments will be jeopardized.

(A. Kozinski, Should Reading Legislative History Be an Impeachable Offense?,31 Suffolk U. L. Rev. 807 (1998) at 813-814)

== See also ==
- Judicial activism
- Legal research
- Signing statement
