= Oral argument =

Spoken presentations to a judge or court

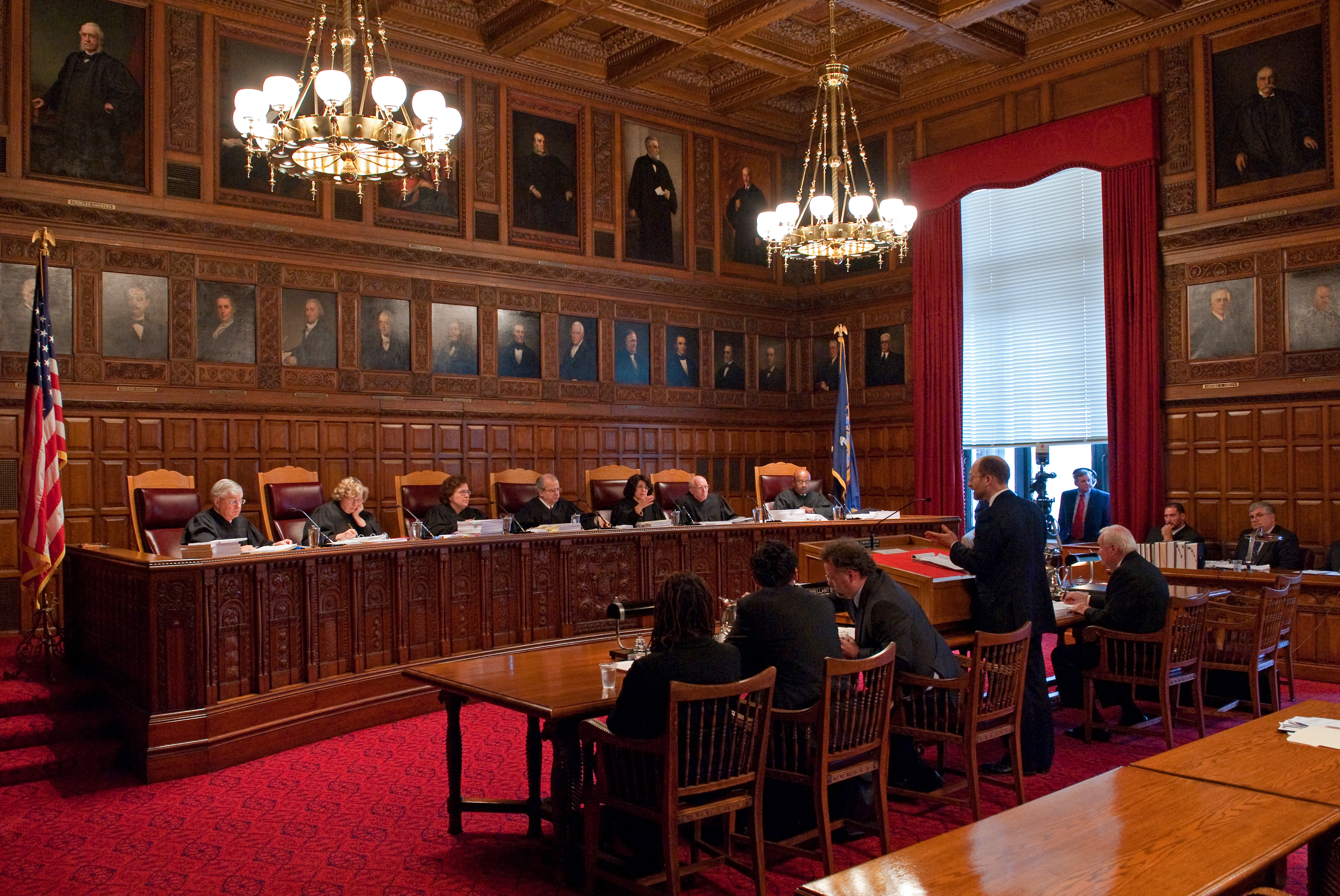
The New York Court of Appeals hears oral arguments in a 2009 case involving the Atlantic Yards development in Brooklyn.

Oral arguments are spoken presentations to a judge or appellate court by a lawyer (or parties when representing themselves) of the legal reasons why they should prevail. Oral argument at the appellate level accompanies written briefs, which also advance the argument of each party in the legal dispute. Oral arguments can also occur during motion practice when one of the parties presents a motion to the court for consideration before trial, such as when the case is to be dismissed on a point of law, or when summary judgment may lie because there are no factual issues in dispute.

Oral argument operates by each party in a case taking turns to speak directly to the judge or judges with an equal amount of time allotted to each. A party may often reserve part of their time to be used for rebuttal after their adversary has presented.

== Procedures ==
Presenting lawyers cannot simply make speeches or read their briefs when presenting oral argument to an appellate court. Unlike trial court procedure, where judges intervene only when asked by the parties to resolve objections, it is typical for judges at the appellate level to be active participants in oral argument, interrupting the presenting lawyers and asking questions. This is true even of courts that are formed of panels of multiple judges, such as the United States Supreme Court, where a presenting lawyer must be prepared to handle questions from any of the nine justices. It is also true that when a motion is made before or during trial that the lawyers conduct themselves before the judge in a manner similar to the presentation of the case on appeal, the lawyers present their arguments to the judge in a more conversational mode; in some pre-trial proceedings these appearances may not be recorded by court stenographers as they are invariably recorded in appellate proceedings.

Oral argument is not always considered an essential part of due process, as the briefs also give the parties an opportunity to be heard by the court. Whether a court will permit, require, or guarantee the opportunity to present oral argument is a decision usually left up to each court to decide as part of its rules of procedure, with differences from court to court even within a single jurisdiction. Some courts may guarantee the right to present oral argument, either requiring the parties to request to present or their waiver if they do not wish to, while other courts may require oral argument without the ability to waive it. Courts may also have the discretion to decide a case without presentation of oral argument, rendering their judgment entirely based on the arguments set forth in the parties' briefs. Rule 34 of the Federal Rules of Appellate Procedure provides that a panel of three judges who have examined the briefs may agree unanimously that oral argument is unnecessary, but otherwise the appeals court would expect to hear oral arguments.

David Tatel, judge in the US Court of Appeals for the District of Columbia Circuit, has referred to a "long-established rule" that contentions made for the first time at oral argument are "rarely considered".

== See also ==
- Closing argument
