= Arbitration case law in the United States =

Arbitration in the United States is governed by the Federal Arbitration Act of 1925 (FAA, codified at 9 U.S.C. 1 et seq.), which requires courts to compel parties who agree to arbitration to participate in binding arbitration, the decision from which is binding upon the parties. Since the passage of the FAA, both state and federal courts have examined arbitration clauses, as well as other statutes involving arbitration clauses, for validity and enforceability.

== Federal courts ==
- Marine Transit Corp. v. Dreyfus, 284 U.S. 263 (1932)
- Schoenamsgruber v. Hamburg American Line, 294 U.S. 454 (1935)
- The Anaconda v. American Sugar Refining Co., 322 U.S. 42 (1944)
- Wilko v. Swan, 346 U.S. 427 (1953): Reach of FAA does not extend to claims under Securities Act of 1933 due to anti-waiver provision in latter. Later overruled.
- Baltimore Contractors, Inc. v. Bodinger, 348 U.S. 176 (1955)
- Bernhardt v. Polygraphic Co. of America, 350 U.S. 198 (1956)
- Moseley v. Electronic & Missile Facilities, Inc., 374 U.S. 167 (1963)
- Prima Paint Corp. v. Flood & Conklin Manufacturing Co., 388 U.S. 395 (1967): An arbitrator must decide the validity of a contract containing an arbitration provision unless the arbitration clause itself is being challenged, even in cases such as when the contract was allegedly fraudulently induced.
- Commonwealth Coatings Corp. v. Continental Casualty Co., 393 U.S. 145 (1968)
- Scherk v. Alberto-Culver Co., 417 U.S. 506 (1974)
- Moses H. Cone Memorial Hospital v. Mercury Construction Corp., 460 U.S. 1 (1983) Federal Arbitration Act (FAA) enacted a strong national policy favoring arbitration, therefore doubts about its applicability are to be resolved in favor of arbitration.
- Southland Corp. v. Keating, 465 U.S. 1 (1984): FAA preempts state law.
- Dean Witter Reynolds Inc. v. Byrd, 470 U.S. 213 (1985). FAA requires that parallel state and federal claims be bifurcated when federal claims are non-arbitrable but state claims are.
- Mitsubishi Motors Corp. v. Soler Chrysler-Plymouth, Inc., 473 U.S. 614 (1985). Sherman Act claims are arbitrable, even when contract calls for arbitration before a foreign panel.
- Shearson/American Express Inc. v. McMahon, 482 U.S. 220 (1987). Securities fraud claims under the Securities Exchange Act of 1934 are arbitrable.
- Perry v. Thomas, 482 U.S. 483 (1987)
- Volt Inf. Sciences v. Stanford Univ., 489 U.S. 468 (1989)
- Rodriguez de Quijas v. Shearson/American Express Inc., 490 U.S. 477 (1989) Securities fraud claims under the Securities Act of 1933 are also arbitrable; Wilko v. Swan overturned.
- Gilmer v. Interstate/Johnson Lane Corp., 500 U.S. 20 (1991): Statutory claims, such as under the Age Discrimination in Employment Act, are subject to arbitration.
- Graham Oil v. ARCO Products Co., 43 F. 3d 1244 (9th Cir. 1994): Agreement to arbitrate statutory claims is not valid when clause prohibits awards of exemplary damages and attorney's fees provided for by statute.
- Allied-Bruce Terminix Cos. v. Dobson, 513 U.S. 265 (1995): FAA requirement that contract involve interstate commerce is to be broadly construed.
- Mastrobuono v. Shearson Lehman Hutton, Inc., 514 U.S. 52 (1995)
- First Options of Chicago, Inc. v. Kaplan, 514 U.S. 938 (1995): Judicial review of arbitrability of contract is properly permitted when parties have not clearly agreed that arbitrator will decide question.
- Vimar Seguros Y Reaseguros, SA v. M/V Sky Reefer, 515 U.S. 528 (1995)
- Doctor's Associates, Inc. v. Casarotto, 517 U.S. 681 (1996): Montana law requiring disclosure of arbitration clauses to be "typed in underlined capital letters on the first page of the contract" preempted by FAA; however, upheld authority of courts to refuse to enforce arbitration clauses on grounds of "generally applicable contract defenses, such as fraud, duress, or unconscionability"
- Quackenbush v. Allstate Ins. Co., 517 U.S. 706 (1996)
- Cole v. Burns International Security Services, 105 F. 3d 1465 (D.C. Cir. 1997): Employees forced to sign arbitration clause as condition of employment cannot be forced to pay any type of fees that a court does not require, such as arbitrator's fees.
- Cortez Byrd Chips, Inc. v. Bill Harbert Constr. Co., 529 U.S. 193 (2000)
- Eastern Associated Coal Corp. v. United Mine Workers of America, 531 U.S. 57 (2000)
- Green Tree Financial Corp.-Ala. v. Randolph, 531 U.S. 79 (2000): Mere speculation that the party resisting arbitration "will be saddled with prohibitive costs is too speculative to justify the invalidation of an arbitration agreement."
- Circuit City Stores, Inc. v. Adams, 532 U.S. 105 (2001)
- C & L Enterprises, Inc. v. Citizen Band, Potawatomi Indian Tribe of Oklahoma, 532 U.S. 411 (2001): Consenting to arbitration constitutes a waiver of sovereign immunity.
- Major League Baseball Players Assn. v. Garvey, 532 U.S. 504 (2001)
- EEOC v. Waffle House, Inc., 534 U.S. 279 (2002)
- Howsam v. Dean Witter Reynolds, Inc., 537 U.S. 79 (2002)
- PacifiCare Health Systems, Inc. v. Book, 538 U.S. 401 (2003)
- Citizens Bank v. Alafabco, Inc., 539 U.S. 52 (2003)
- Green Tree Financial Corp. v. Bazzle, 539 U.S. 444 (2003)
- Buckeye Check Cashing, Inc. v. Cardegna, 546 U.S. 440 (2006): Refines Prima Paint by holding that an arbitrator must decide if a contractual provision other than the arbitration clause renders the entire contract invalid.
- Preston v. Ferrer, 552 U.S. 346 (2008): The FAA preempts state laws declaring that certain disputes must be resolved by a state administrative agency.
- Hall Street Associates, L.L.C. v. Mattel, Inc., 552 U.S. 576 (2008): 9 U.S.C. §§ 10 and 11 are absolutely exclusive as grounds for fighting the confirmation of an arbitration award and cannot be expanded by court rulings or contracting parties.
- Vaden v. Discover Bank, 556 U.S. 49 (2009)
- 14 Penn Plaza LLC v. Pyett, 556 U.S. 247 (2009)
- Arthur Andersen LLP v. Carlisle, 556 U.S. 624 (2009)
- Stolt-Nielsen S. A. v. AnimalFeeds Int'l Corp., 559 U.S. 662 (2010)
- Rent-A-Center, West, Inc. v. Jackson, 561 U.S. 63 (2010): A court must decide whether or not an arbitration clause is unconscionable, even if the contract unequivocally states that the arbitrator must make that decision.
- Granite Rock Co. v. Teamsters, 561 U.S. 287 (2010)
- AT&T Mobility LLC v. Concepcion, 563 U.S. 333 (2011): Arbitration agreements that forbid class action arbitration are enforceable, notwithstanding California's "Discover Bank Rule."
- KPMG LLP v. Cocchi, 565 U.S. 18 (2011)
- CompuCredit Corp. v. Greenwood, 565 U.S. 95 (2012)
- Marmet Health Care Center, Inc. v. Brown, 565 U.S. 530 (2012)
- Nitro-Lift Technologies, L. L. C. v. Howard, 568 U.S. 17 (2012)
- Oxford Health Plans LLC v. Sutter, 569 U.S. 564 (2013)
- Am. Express Co. v. Italian Colors Rest., 570 U.S. 228 (2013)
- DIRECTV, Inc. v. Imburgia, No. 14-462, 577 U.S. ___ (2015)
- Kindred Nursing Centers, L. P. v. Clark, No. 16-32, 581 U.S. ___ (2017)
- Epic Systems Corp. v. Lewis, No. 16-285, 584 U.S. ___ (2018)
- Henry Schein, Inc. v. Archer & White Sales, Inc., No. 17-1272, 586 U.S. ___ (2019)
- New Prime Inc. v. Oliveira, No. 17-340, 586 U.S. ___ (2019)
- Lamps Plus, Inc. v. Varela, No. 17-988, 587 U.S. ___ (2019)
- GE Energy Power Conversion France SAS v. Outokumpu Stainless USA, LLC, No. 18-1048, 590 U.S. ___ (2020)
- Henry Schein, Inc. v. Archer & White Sales, Inc., No. 19-963, 592 U.S. ___ (2021)
- Badgerow v. Walters, No. 20-1143, 596 U.S. ___ (2022)
- Morgan v. Sundance, Inc., No. 21-328, 596 U.S. ___ (2022)
- Southwest Airlines Co. v. Saxon, No. 21-309, 596 U.S. ___ (2022)
- ZF Automotive U. S., Inc. v. Luxshare, Ltd., No. 21-401, 596 U.S. ___ (2022)
- Viking River Cruises, Inc. v. Moriana, No. 20-1573, 596 U.S. ___ (2022)
- Coinbase, Inc. v. Bielski, No. 22-105, 599 U.S. ___ (2023)
- Bissonnette v. LePage Bakeries Park St., LLC, No. 23-51, 601 U.S. ___ (2024)
- Smith v. Spizzirri, No. 22-1218, 601 U.S. ___ (2024)
- Coinbase, Inc. v. Suski, No. 23-3, 602 U.S. ___ (2024)

== State courts ==
- Discover Bank v. Superior Court (113 P. 3d 1100 (Cal. 2005)): Held a class action waiver in an arbitration clause unconscionable when disputes will involve small amounts of damages and are part of a scheme by a company with superior bargaining power to deliberately cheat many consumers (the "Discover Bank test").
