= Federal Arbitration Act =

United States legal statute

United States Arbitration Act
- Long title: An Act To make valid and enforceable written provisions or agreements for arbitration of disputes arising out of contracts, maritime transactions, or commerce among the States or Territories or with foreign nations
- Acronyms (colloquial): FAA
- Nicknames: Federal Arbitration Act
- Enacted by: the 68th United States Congress
- Effective: January 1, 1926

Citations
- Public law: Pub. L. 68–401
- Statutes at Large: ch. 213, 43 Stat. 883

Legislative history
- Signed into law by President Calvin Coolidge on February 12, 1925

United States Supreme Court cases
- List: Wilko v. Swan, 346 U.S. 427 (1953); Prima Paint Corp. v. Flood & Conklin Manufacturing Co., 388 U.S. 395 (1967); Moses H. Cone Memorial Hospital v. Mercury Construction Corp., 460 U.S. 1 (1983); Southland Corp. v. Keating, 465 U.S. 1 (1984); Dean Witter Reynolds Inc. v. Byrd, 470 U.S. 213 (1985); Mitsubishi Motors Corp. v. Soler Chrysler-Plymouth, Inc., 473 U.S. 614 (1985); Shearson/American Express Inc. v. McMahon, 482 U.S. 220 (1987); Perry v. Thomas, 482 U.S. 483 (1987); Volt Inf. Sciences v. Stanford Univ., 489 U.S. 468 (1989); Rodriguez de Quijas v. Shearson/American Express Inc., 490 U.S. 477 (1989); Gilmer v. Interstate/Johnson Lane Corp., 500 U.S. 20 (1991); Graham Oil v. ARCO Products Co., 43 F. 3d 1244 (9th Cir. 1994); Allied-Bruce Terminix Cos. v. Dobson, 513 U.S. 265 (1995); Mastrobuono v. Shearson Lehman Hutton, Inc., 514 U.S. 52 (1995); First Options of Chicago, Inc. v. Kaplan, 514 U.S. 938 (1995); Doctor's Associates, Inc. v. Casarotto, 517 U.S. 681 (1996); Eastern Associated Coal Corp. v. United Mine Workers of America, 531 U.S. 57 (2000); Green Tree Financial Corp.-Ala. v. Randolph, 531 U.S. 79 (2000); Circuit City Stores, Inc. v. Adams, 532 U.S. 105 (2001); C & L Enterprises, Inc. v. Citizen Band, Potawatomi Indian Tribe of Oklahoma, 532 U.S. 411 (2001); Major League Baseball Players Assn. v. Garvey, 532 U.S. 504 (2001); EEOC v. Waffle House, Inc., 534 U.S. 279 (2002); Howsam v. Dean Witter Reynolds, Inc., 537 U.S. 79 (2002); PacifiCare Health Systems, Inc. v. Book, 538 U.S. 401 (2003); Citizens Bank v. Alafabco, Inc., 539 U.S. 52 (2003); Buckeye Check Cashing, Inc. v. Cardegna, 546 U.S. 440 (2006); Preston v. Ferrer, 552 U.S. 346 (2008); Hall Street Associates, L.L.C. v. Mattel, Inc., 552 U.S. 576 (2008); Vaden v. Discover Bank, 556 U.S. 49 (2009); 14 Penn Plaza LLC v. Pyett, 556 U.S. 247 (2009); Arthur Andersen LLP v. Carlisle, 556 U.S. 624 (2009); Stolt-Nielsen S. A. v. AnimalFeeds Int'l Corp., 559 U.S. 662 (2010); Rent-A-Center, West, Inc. v. Jackson, 561 U.S. 63 (2010); Granite Rock Co. v. Teamsters, 561 U.S. 287 (2010); AT&T Mobility LLC v. Concepcion, 563 U.S. 333 (2011); KPMG LLP v. Cocchi, 565 U.S. 18 (2011); CompuCredit Corp. v. Greenwood, 565 U.S. 95 (2012); Marmet Health Care Center, Inc. v. Brown, 565 U.S. 530 (2012); Nitro-Lift Technologies, L. L. C. v. Howard, 568 U.S. 17 (2012); Oxford Health Plans LLC v. Sutter, 569 U.S. 564 (2013); Am. Express Co. v. Italian Colors Rest., 570 U.S. 228 (2013); DIRECTV, Inc. v. Imburgia, No. 14-462, 577 U.S. ___ (2015); Kindred Nursing Centers, L. P. v. Clark, No. 16-32, 581 U.S. ___ (2017); Epic Systems Corp. v. Lewis, No. 16-285, 584 U.S. ___ (2018); Henry Schein, Inc. v. Archer & White Sales, Inc., No. 17-1272, 586 U.S. ___ (2019); New Prime Inc. v. Oliveira, No. 17-340, 586 U.S. ___ (2019); Lamps Plus, Inc. v. Varela, No. 17-988, 587 U.S. ___ (2019); GE Energy Power Conversion France SAS v. Outokumpu Stainless USA, LLC, No. 18-1048, 590 U.S. ___ (2020); Henry Schein, Inc. v. Archer & White Sales, Inc., No. 19-963, 592 U.S. ___ (2021); Badgerow v. Walters, No. 20-1143, 596 U.S. ___ (2022); Morgan v. Sundance, Inc., No. 21-328, 596 U.S. ___ (2022); Southwest Airlines Co. v. Saxon, No. 21-309, 596 U.S. ___ (2022); Viking River Cruises, Inc. v. Moriana, No. 20-1573, 596 U.S. ___ (2022); Coinbase, Inc. v. Bielski, No. 22-105, 599 U.S. ___ (2023); Bissonnette v. LePage Bakeries Park St., LLC, No. 23-51, 601 U.S. ___ (2024); Smith v. Spizzirri, No. 22-1218, 601 U.S. ___ (2024); Coinbase, Inc. v. Suski, No. 23-3, 602 U.S. ___ (2024)

The United States Arbitration Act (Pub. L. 68–401, 43 Stat. 883, enacted February 12, 1925, codified at 9 U.S.C. ch. 1), more commonly referred to as the Federal Arbitration Act or FAA, is an act of Congress that provides for non-judicial facilitation of private dispute resolution through arbitration. It applies in both state courts and federal courts, as was held in Southland Corp. v. Keating. It applies in all contracts, excluding contracts of seamen, railroad employees, or any other class of workers involved in foreign or interstate commerce, and it is predicated on an exercise of the Commerce Clause powers granted to Congress in the U.S. Constitution.

The FAA provides for contract-based compulsory and binding arbitration, resulting in an arbitration award entered by an arbitrator or arbitration panel as opposed to a judgment entered by a court of law. In an arbitration, the parties give up the right to an appeal on substantive grounds to a court.

Once an award is entered by an arbitrator or arbitration panel, it must be "confirmed" in a court of law; and once confirmed, the award is reduced to an enforceable judgment, which may be enforced by the winning party in court, like any other judgment. Under the FAA, an award must be confirmed within one year, and any objection to an award must be challenged by the losing party within three months. An arbitration agreement may be entered "prospectively" (ie., in advance of any actual dispute), or may be entered into by the disputing parties once a dispute has arisen.

== Legal challenges ==
The Supreme Court ruled in Hall Street Associates, L.L.C. v. Mattel, Inc. that the grounds for judicial review specified in the FAA may not be expanded, even if the parties to the arbitration agreement agree to allow expanded review of the decision.

In 2013, the Court ruled in American Express Co. v. Italian Colors Restaurant that class action waivers contained in mandatory arbitration clauses were valid even if plaintiffs prove that it would not be economically practicable to maintain these actions individually.

In the 2018 decision Epic Systems Corp. v. Lewis, the Supreme Court ruled that the FAA is not overridden by the protection of concerted activity established by the National Labor Relations Act of 1935, effectively making individual arbitration agreements in contracts wholly enforceable.

Within New Prime Inc. v. Oliveira, decided in 2019, the Court decided unanimously that when contracts include mandatory arbitration clauses, employees still have the right to seek court oversight to determine if such employment falls within the exceptions outlined in section 1 of the FAA related to employees involved in interstate commerce, and that these protections apply to both those classified as employees and as independent contractors.

== Partial preemption of state law ==
Section 2 of the FAA declares that arbitration provisions will be subject to invalidation only for the same grounds applicable to contractual provisions generally, such as unconscionability or duress. Consequently, most state law that disfavors the enforcement of arbitration agreements will be preempted by the FAA. State laws that govern the procedures of arbitration, but do not affect its enforcement, are outside the Act's preemptive scope.

Not all state laws regarding arbitration are preempted, for example:

- NASD rule 12204 of 1992 (now FINRA Rule 2268), which allows investor class actions to proceed in federal court nullifies arbitration agreements when class certification is sought, is not preempted.
- California H&SC 1363.1 is partially preempted.

However, a Financial Industry Regulatory Authority (FINRA) Office of Hearing Officers (OHO) decision in a disciplinary action against Charles Schwab & Co. questions the ability of a regulator to enforce arbitration agreement restrictions such as NASD Rule 12204 (FINRA Rule 2268). The dispute arose when Charles Schwab & Co. revised its pre-dispute arbitration agreement to preclude a customer from participating in a class action against the firm, effectively removing the ability for a customer to have a claim heard in court. FINRA rules require arbitration through a FINRA arbitration panel, except in the case of class actions, which are reserved for the court system.

Specifically, the OHO Panel cited the Supreme Court decision in Shearson/American Express Inc. v. McMahon that securities law claims are no exception to the FAA's mandate that parties to an otherwise valid arbitration agreement submit the claim to arbitration. The OHO Panel also applied the Supreme Court decision in AT&T Mobility v. Concepcion where the Court established that class actions also are not an exception to the FAA, stating that a party to an arbitration agreement has no right to participate in a class action instead of an arbitration on an individual basis and that an exception to the FAA's mandate requires clear expression of Congressional intent. FINRA has appealed the OHO decision to the National Adjudicatory Council.

A case-by-case analysis is required to determine whether a specific California law is preempted. In general, where the FAA has no procedural provisions applicable in state court, there is no preemption.

A number of Supreme Court cases have dealt with the preemption of state laws by the Federal Arbitration Act:

- Marine Transit Corp. v. Dreyfus, 284 U.S. 263 (1932)
- Schoenamsgruber v. Hamburg American Line, 294 U.S. 454 (1935)
- The Anaconda v. American Sugar Refining Co., 322 U.S. 42 (1944)
- Wilko v. Swan, 346 U.S. 427 (1953): Reach of FAA does not extend to claims under Securities Act of 1933 due to anti-waiver provision in latter. Later overruled.
- Baltimore Contractors, Inc. v. Bodinger, 348 U.S. 176 (1955)
- Bernhardt v. Polygraphic Co. of America, 350 U.S. 198 (1956)
- Moseley v. Electronic & Missile Facilities, Inc., 374 U.S. 167 (1963)
- Prima Paint Corp. v. Flood & Conklin Manufacturing Co., 388 U.S. 395 (1967): An arbitrator must decide the validity of a contract containing an arbitration provision unless the arbitration clause itself is being challenged, even in cases such as when the contract was allegedly fraudulently induced.
- Commonwealth Coatings Corp. v. Continental Casualty Co., 393 U.S. 145 (1968)
- Scherk v. Alberto-Culver Co., 417 U.S. 506 (1974)
- Moses H. Cone Memorial Hospital v. Mercury Construction Corp., 460 U.S. 1 (1983) Federal Arbitration Act (FAA) enacted a strong national policy favoring arbitration, therefore doubts about its applicability are to be resolved in favor of arbitration.
- Southland Corp. v. Keating, 465 U.S. 1 (1984): FAA preempts state law.
- Dean Witter Reynolds Inc. v. Byrd, 470 U.S. 213 (1985). FAA requires that parallel state and federal claims be bifurcated when federal claims are non-arbitrable but state claims are.
- Mitsubishi Motors Corp. v. Soler Chrysler-Plymouth, Inc., 473 U.S. 614 (1985). Sherman Act claims are arbitrable, even when contract calls for arbitration before a foreign panel.
- Shearson/American Express Inc. v. McMahon, 482 U.S. 220 (1987). Securities fraud claims under the Securities Exchange Act of 1934 are arbitrable.
- Perry v. Thomas, 482 U.S. 483 (1987)
- Volt Inf. Sciences v. Stanford Univ., 489 U.S. 468 (1989)
- Rodriguez de Quijas v. Shearson/American Express Inc., 490 U.S. 477 (1989) Securities fraud claims under the Securities Act of 1933 are also arbitrable; Wilko v. Swan overturned.
- Gilmer v. Interstate/Johnson Lane Corp., 500 U.S. 20 (1991): Statutory claims, such as under the Age Discrimination in Employment Act, are subject to arbitration.
- Graham Oil v. ARCO Products Co., 43 F. 3d 1244 (9th Cir. 1994): Agreement to arbitrate statutory claims is not valid when clause prohibits awards of exemplary damages and attorney's fees provided for by statute.
- Allied-Bruce Terminix Cos. v. Dobson, 513 U.S. 265 (1995): FAA requirement that contract involve interstate commerce is to be broadly construed.
- Mastrobuono v. Shearson Lehman Hutton, Inc., 514 U.S. 52 (1995)
- First Options of Chicago, Inc. v. Kaplan, 514 U.S. 938 (1995): Judicial review of arbitrability of contract is properly permitted when parties have not clearly agreed that arbitrator will decide question.
- Vimar Seguros Y Reaseguros, SA v. M/V Sky Reefer, 515 U.S. 528 (1995)
- Doctor's Associates, Inc. v. Casarotto, 517 U.S. 681 (1996): Montana law requiring disclosure of arbitration clauses to be "typed in underlined capital letters on the first page of the contract" preempted by FAA; however, upheld authority of courts to refuse to enforce arbitration clauses on grounds of "generally applicable contract defenses, such as fraud, duress, or unconscionability"
- Quackenbush v. Allstate Ins. Co., 517 U.S. 706 (1996)
- Cole v. Burns International Security Services, 105 F. 3d 1465 (D.C. Cir. 1997): Employees forced to sign arbitration clause as condition of employment cannot be forced to pay any type of fees that a court does not require, such as arbitrator's fees.
- Cortez Byrd Chips, Inc. v. Bill Harbert Constr. Co., 529 U.S. 193 (2000)
- Eastern Associated Coal Corp. v. United Mine Workers of America, 531 U.S. 57 (2000)
- Green Tree Financial Corp.-Ala. v. Randolph, 531 U.S. 79 (2000): Mere speculation that the party resisting arbitration "will be saddled with prohibitive costs is too speculative to justify the invalidation of an arbitration agreement."
- Circuit City Stores, Inc. v. Adams, 532 U.S. 105 (2001)
- C & L Enterprises, Inc. v. Citizen Band, Potawatomi Indian Tribe of Oklahoma, 532 U.S. 411 (2001): Consenting to arbitration constitutes a waiver of sovereign immunity.
- Major League Baseball Players Assn. v. Garvey, 532 U.S. 504 (2001)
- EEOC v. Waffle House, Inc., 534 U.S. 279 (2002)
- Howsam v. Dean Witter Reynolds, Inc., 537 U.S. 79 (2002)
- PacifiCare Health Systems, Inc. v. Book, 538 U.S. 401 (2003)
- Citizens Bank v. Alafabco, Inc., 539 U.S. 52 (2003)
- Green Tree Financial Corp. v. Bazzle, 539 U.S. 444 (2003)
- Buckeye Check Cashing, Inc. v. Cardegna, 546 U.S. 440 (2006): Refines Prima Paint by holding that an arbitrator must decide if a contractual provision other than the arbitration clause renders the entire contract invalid.
- Preston v. Ferrer, 552 U.S. 346 (2008): The FAA preempts state laws declaring that certain disputes must be resolved by a state administrative agency.
- Hall Street Associates, L.L.C. v. Mattel, Inc., 552 U.S. 576 (2008): 9 U.S.C. §§ 10 and 11 are absolutely exclusive as grounds for fighting the confirmation of an arbitration award and cannot be expanded by court rulings or contracting parties.
- Vaden v. Discover Bank, 556 U.S. 49 (2009)
- 14 Penn Plaza LLC v. Pyett, 556 U.S. 247 (2009)
- Arthur Andersen LLP v. Carlisle, 556 U.S. 624 (2009)
- Stolt-Nielsen S. A. v. AnimalFeeds Int'l Corp., 559 U.S. 662 (2010)
- Rent-A-Center, West, Inc. v. Jackson, 561 U.S. 63 (2010): A court must decide whether or not an arbitration clause is unconscionable, even if the contract unequivocally states that the arbitrator must make that decision.
- Granite Rock Co. v. Teamsters, 561 U.S. 287 (2010)
- AT&T Mobility LLC v. Concepcion, 563 U.S. 333 (2011): Arbitration agreements that forbid class action arbitration are enforceable, notwithstanding California's "Discover Bank Rule."
- KPMG LLP v. Cocchi, 565 U.S. 18 (2011)
- CompuCredit Corp. v. Greenwood, 565 U.S. 95 (2012)
- Marmet Health Care Center, Inc. v. Brown, 565 U.S. 530 (2012)
- Nitro-Lift Technologies, L. L. C. v. Howard, 568 U.S. 17 (2012)
- Oxford Health Plans LLC v. Sutter, 569 U.S. 564 (2013)
- Am. Express Co. v. Italian Colors Rest., 570 U.S. 228 (2013)
- DIRECTV, Inc. v. Imburgia, No. 14-462, 577 U.S. ___ (2015)
- Kindred Nursing Centers, L. P. v. Clark, No. 16-32, 581 U.S. ___ (2017)
- Epic Systems Corp. v. Lewis, No. 16-285, 584 U.S. ___ (2018)
- Henry Schein, Inc. v. Archer & White Sales, Inc., No. 17-1272, 586 U.S. ___ (2019)
- New Prime Inc. v. Oliveira, No. 17-340, 586 U.S. ___ (2019)
- Lamps Plus, Inc. v. Varela, No. 17-988, 587 U.S. ___ (2019)
- GE Energy Power Conversion France SAS v. Outokumpu Stainless USA, LLC, No. 18-1048, 590 U.S. ___ (2020)
- Henry Schein, Inc. v. Archer & White Sales, Inc., No. 19-963, 592 U.S. ___ (2021)
- Badgerow v. Walters, No. 20-1143, 596 U.S. ___ (2022)
- Morgan v. Sundance, Inc., No. 21-328, 596 U.S. ___ (2022)
- Southwest Airlines Co. v. Saxon, No. 21-309, 596 U.S. ___ (2022)
- ZF Automotive U. S., Inc. v. Luxshare, Ltd., No. 21-401, 596 U.S. ___ (2022)
- Viking River Cruises, Inc. v. Moriana, No. 20-1573, 596 U.S. ___ (2022)
- Coinbase, Inc. v. Bielski, No. 22-105, 599 U.S. ___ (2023)
- Bissonnette v. LePage Bakeries Park St., LLC, No. 23-51, 601 U.S. ___ (2024)
- Smith v. Spizzirri, No. 22-1218, 601 U.S. ___ (2024)
- Coinbase, Inc. v. Suski, No. 23-3, 602 U.S. ___ (2024)

== Proposed reform ==
Following on a number of recent Supreme Court decisions that found in favor of employers in arbitration disputes, Democrats in both houses of Congress introduced the Forced Arbitration Injustice Repeal Act (FAIR Act) in February 2019. The proposed bill would modify the FAA to make any contract that requires forced arbitration invalid, outside of limited conditions, making judges the decision-making body in disputes where arbitration may be required, and prevent employment contracts from blocking the employee's engagement with labor unions due to arbitration. The bill was introduced following events at several large tech firms, including Google, that led to the companies eliminating forced arbitration from their employee contracts.

While the bill did not pass the Senate during the 116th Congress, it passed the House of Representatives with support from all House Democrats and sole Republican Matt Gaetz. The FAIR Act was reintroduced in the 117th Congress, where it once again passed in the House with Rep. Gaetz as the sole Republican supporter, but once again died in committee in the Senate. The FAIR Act was again reintroduced in the 118th Congress, but had no further actions taken in either chamber. It is currently unknown if it will be reintroduced during the 119th Congress, but it is not expected to be successful with Republicans controlling both chambers.

== See also ==
- Arbitration in the United States
- Doe et al. v. Trump Corp. et al.
- United States labor law
