= Epic Systems Corp. v. Lewis =

- Supreme Court of the United States

Argued October 2, 2017 Decided May 21, 2018
- Full case name: Epic Systems Corporation v. Jacob Lewis; Ernst & Young LLP, et al. v. Morris, et al. National Labor Relations Board v. Murphy Oil USA, Inc., et al.
- Docket nos.: 16-285; 16-300; 16-307
- Citations: 584 U.S. ___ (more) 138 S. Ct. 1612; 200 L. Ed. 2d 889
- Argument: Oral argument

Case history
- Prior: Lewis v. Epic Systems Corp., No. 3:15-cv-00082, 2015 WL 5330300 (W.D. Wis. Sept. 11, 2015); affirmed, 823 F.3d 1147 (7th Cir. 2016); Ernst & Young LLP v. Morris, No. 4:12-cv-04964, 2013 WL 3460052 (N.D. Cal. July 09, 2013); reversed, 834 F.3d 975 (9th Cir. 2016); Murphy Oil USA, Inc. v. NLRB, 808 F.3d 1013 (5th Cir. 2015)

Holding
- Congress has instructed in the Federal Arbitration Act that arbitration agreements providing for individualized proceedings must be enforced and neither saving clause of the Act nor the National Labor Relations Act of 1935 suggests otherwise.

Court membership
- Chief Justice John Roberts Associate Justices Anthony Kennedy · Clarence Thomas; Ruth Bader Ginsburg · Stephen Breyer; Samuel Alito · Sonia Sotomayor; Elena Kagan · Neil Gorsuch

Case opinions
- Majority: Gorsuch, joined by Roberts, Kennedy, Thomas, Alito
- Concurrence: Thomas
- Dissent: Ginsburg, joined by Breyer, Sotomayor, Kagan

Laws applied
- Federal Arbitration Act, National Labor Relations Act

External videos
- Oral arguments on C-SPAN

Epic Systems Corp. v. Lewis, 584 U.S. ___ (2018), was a case decided by the Supreme Court of the United States on how two federal laws, the National Labor Relations Act (NLRA) and the Federal Arbitration Act (FAA), relate to whether employment contracts can legally bar employees from collective arbitration. The Supreme Court had consolidated three cases, Epic Systems Corp. v Lewis (Docket 16-285), Ernst & Young LLP v. Morris (16-300), and National Labor Relations Board v. Murphy Oil USA, Inc. (16-307). In a 5–4 decision issued in May 2018, the Court ruled that arbitration agreements requiring individual arbitration and prohibiting class action lawsuits are enforceable under the FAA, regardless of allowances set out within the NLRA.

== Background ==
=== Federal Arbitration Act ===
The Federal Arbitration Act (FAA) 9 U.S.C. § 1 was enacted in 1925, and allowed for disputes related to contractual agreements to be settled through arbitration outside of the judicial system. The FAA includes allowances for contracts to contain provisions for compulsory and binding arbitration agreements. The language in question to the case related to the FAA's "savings clause", which stated that written arbitration agreements "shall be valid, irrevocable, and enforceable, save upon such grounds as exist at law or in equity for the revocation of any contract."

=== National Labor Relations Act of 1935 ===
The National Labor Relations Act of 1935 (NLRA, also known as the Wagner Act) 29 U.S.C. § 157 was passed among several other laws and programs under the New Deal. The NLRA enabled employees to form trade unions and to take collective actions against employers, among other aspects, as to counter unfair employment practices that had plagued the Great Depression.

Section 7 of the NLRA reads, in part:

Employees shall have the right to self-organization, to form, join, or assist labor organizations, to bargain collectively through representatives of their own choosing, and to engage in other concerted activities for the purpose of collective bargaining or other mutual aid or protection

This case centered on whether employee class action lawsuits fell under "other concerted activities" of NLRA's section 7.

=== Prior Cases ===
The Supreme Court case was the consolidation of three prior cases which had created a split opinion in the Circuit Courts in relation to the FAA and the NLRA, and which all had submitted petitions for writ of certiorari in 2016.

Epic Systems Corp. v. Lewis (Docket 16-285) involved employees at Epic Systems, a Wisconsin healthcare software company. In April 2014, the company notified employees to agree to a new employee policy that required them to use individual arbitration in any disputes. Employee Jacob Lewis, a technical writer, agreed to the terms as instructed. Later, in February 2015, Lewis filed a suit against the company in the United States District Court for the Western District of Wisconsin as a collective action by the other technical writers, asserting their failure to follow Fair Labor Standards Act of 1938 and Wisconsin law by not properly paying them overtime wages. Epic attempted to dismiss the suit, arguing that the arbitration agreement signed by Lewis prevented him from taking collective actions and required individual arbitration. The District Court refused to dismiss the case, arguing that Lewis' action was a protected concerted activity under Section 7 of the NLRA, and that the arbitration agreement in April 2014 violated those terms. Epic appealed to the United States Court of Appeals for the Seventh Circuit, arguing that the District Court failed to uphold the standards of the Federal Arbitration Act (FAA), which they claim made any written arbitration agreements binding regardless of the NLRA. The Circuit Court rejected Epic's arguments, agreeing that the District Court's ruling on the NLRA was correct, and that the FAA had a "saving clause" which states that the FAA may be unenforceable if "such grounds as exist at law or in equity for the revocation of any contract", referring to the NLRA language.

Ernst & Young LLP v. Morris (Docket 16-300) involved the multinational accounting firm Ernst & Young. Stephen Morris and Kelly McDaniel were employees of Ernst & Young and had signed employee contracts that required individual arbitration on their employment in the 2000s. Morris and McDaniel brought a class-action suit in the United States District Court for the Southern District of New York on behalf of Ernst & Young employees in California, asserting the firm had violated the Fair Labor Standards Act related to overtime pay. The case was transferred to the United States District Court for the Northern District of California, where the Court ruled that Ernst & Young's arbitration was binding and dismissed the case. The Court said in its decision, that Congress in passing the NLRA did not signify any intent to override the FAA, and ruled on the basis of the FAA's provisions. Morris and McDaniel appealed to the United States Court of Appeals for the Ninth Circuit. The Ninth Circuit reversed and remanded the District Court's decision, stating that the NLRA's Section 7 protects concerted activities, which was to be considered covered by the FAA's saving clause.

National Labor Relations Board v. Murphy Oil USA, Inc. (Docket 16-307) involved the petrochemical company Murphy Oil. Sheila Hobson was an employee and had agreed to the individual arbitration agreement as part of her employment contract. In 2010, Hobson and three other employees filed suit in the United States District Court for the Northern District of Alabama alleging complaints under the Fair Labor Standards Act. Murphy Oil sought the Court to dismiss the case and compel arbitration under the employment contract, and the Court agreed. Hobson filed a complaint with the National Labor Relations Board, who evaluated Hobson's case. During this period, the Board reviewed a similar charge against construction firm D. R. Horton; the Board issued a formal complaint against Horton, but Horton challenged this case in United States Court of Appeals for the Fifth Circuit. The Fifth Circuit ruled against the Board, stating that the FAA was not overridden by the NLRA. Despite this ruling, the Board found in favor of Hobson's case against Murphy Oil, still asserting the NLRA protected collective actions within the FAA's saving clause, and issued a formal complaint against the company. Murphy Oil challenged the Board's ruling in the Firth Circuit Court. The Board attempted to seek an en banc hearing but was denied by the court. The Court followed suit from the Horton case, ruling against the Board and finding the FAA was not overridden by the NLRA.

== Supreme Court ==
The three cases above created a split decision among the circuit courts related to how the FAA and NLRA interacted. All three cases were petitioned to the Supreme Court of the United States for a writ of certiorari during 2016, effectively asking the same questions related to the FAA and NLRA. The Court agreed to hear the cases in January 2017, consolidating them into a single case. Observers felt that the case would favor the employers, as the Court had ruled favorably in support of arbitration in recent cases, including AT&T Mobility LLC v. Concepcion, 563 U.S. 333 (2011), where the court held that the Federal Arbitration Act nullified a California law banning certain class-action waivers, and DIRECTV, Inc. v. Imburgia, 577 U.S. ___ (2015).

The prospective for how the case would be resolved changed following the election of Donald Trump as President of the United States, succeeding Barack Obama. During the Obama administration, the National Labor Relations Board agency had generally favored employees and helped to defend against unfair arbitration practices. The Board continued to support employees in its petition of National Labor Relations Board v. Murphy Oil, stating "Resolving the question presented will have a direct and immediate effect on countless employees and employers throughout the nation because individual-arbitration agreements have become so widespread." However, by June 2017, the Board, now operating under the Trump administration, issued its amicus curiae for the case supportive of the employers' position. Following the death of Justice Antonin Scalia, Trump's nominee for the vacant seat, Neil Gorsuch, had been confirmed in April 2017. This replacement helped maintain a majority of conservative justices on the Court, which was expected to favor employers.

The court heard oral arguments on October 2, 2017, which observers felt favored the employers' position. During the arguments Chief Justice John Roberts noted that a decision favoring the employees would disrupt the status quo, asking the respondents' counsel, "So this decision in your favor would invalidate...agreements covering [25 million] employees?" Justice Ruth Bader Ginsburg was critical that employee contracts with arbitration agreements provided "no true bargaining" and considered that a ruling in favor of employers would create a situation similar to yellow-dog contracts, which would ban employees from unionizing and for which the NLRA had been created to prevent.

The Court issued its decision on May 21, 2018. In a 5–4 decision, the Court ruled that the FAA makes individual arbitration agreements enforceable, and that neither the saving clause of the FAA or the NLRA operate to override that outcome. Justice Gorsuch wrote the majority opinion joined by Justices Roberts, Anthony Kennedy, Clarence Thomas and Samuel Alito, with Thomas also writing a concurring opinion. Gorsuch wrote that in reviewing the intent of Congress in the passage of the NLRA and FAA, that through the FAA "Congress has instructed federal courts to enforce arbitration agreements according to their terms—including terms providing for individualized proceedings." Gorsuch wrote that the Congressional intent behind the FAA was a "liberal federal policy favoring arbitration", whereas the NLRA dealt more with the actions of collective bargaining, and that the "other concerted activities" language of Section 7 of the NLRA must be read with this intent and not towards dispute resolution. The opinion reversed the Circuit Court rulings in both Epic Systems and in Ernst Young, remanding these back to the Circuit Court, while affirming the decision in National Labor Relations Board.

Justice Ruth Bader Ginsburg wrote the dissenting opinion, and read parts of her opinion at the bench, and was joined by Justices Stephen Breyer, Sonia Sotomayor and Elena Kagan. Ginsburg wrote that "The court today holds enforceable this arm-twisted, take-it-or-leave-it contracts—including the provisions requiring employees to litigate wage and hours claims only one-by-one. ... Federal labor law does not countenance such isolation of employees."

Some observers noted that this was a substantially more aggressive judicial stance than the predecessor case on arbitration, Gilmer v. Interstate/Johnson Lane Corp. (1991). Gilmer had allowed for statutes to take priority over an arbitration agreement that contradicted them, even if said statutes did not explicitly mention the FAA or arbitration. Epic, in contrast, required such mention to be explicit in the plain text of the statute(s).

== Impact ==
The case attracted significant attention because tens of millions of Americans are subject to employment agreements requiring individual arbitration rather than collective actions. The inability for employees to take collective action had been said to potentially allow employers to be less accountable to employees, and would deter employees from taking the time, cost, and effort needed to resolve individual arbitration, effectively silencing their concerns.

Justice Ginsburg's dissenting opinion stated that "Congressional correction" of the majority decision was "urgently in order" to protect employees. The AFL–CIO also stated that Congress should "immediately enact" legislation to override the ruling. Some reporters opined that the decision would impact how sex discrimination in the workplace would be handled as otherwise protected by Title VII of the Civil Rights Act of 1964, and how that would affect efforts like the MeToo movement, since enforced individual arbitration allows employers to quietly handle such complaints.

Jonathan H. Adler and Samuel Estreicher speculated that the decision will actually benefit the majority of workers because it provides a renewed incentive to put fair arbitration agreements in place. Many individual employees lack the resources to hire an attorney to pursue their case in court, and arbitration could provide a low-cost alternative that allows them to present their cases. The idea that arbitration is more affordable for workers than class action litigation has been disputed by Peter Shamshiri of the 5-4 podcast, who argued: "A class action in court, there's a filing fee of a few hundred bucks, but that's generally gonna be paid by the attorneys on behalf of the whole class. If you go to arbitration, there is also a filing fee. It's not huge. It varies from arbitrator to arbitrator, but we're definitely talking about a couple hundred bucks at least. So you would have to pay a fee that is worth as much, if not more, than your actual claim. All of which to say, there's absolutely no reason to do it in those circumstances."

Following the court's decision, some employees who alleged employer wrongdoing and found themselves without class action suits as a recourse instead turned to coordinating their arbitration disputes en masse. In 2020, 5,010 DoorDash drivers each paid $300 to bring their individual claims to an arbitrator. DoorDash responded by refusing to pay their own arbitration fees of $1,900 per case, but the drivers then filed two motions to compel arbitration which were affirmed by U.S. District Judge William Alsup. DoorDash subsequently switched to a different private arbitration service provider in order to shield themselves with a more favorable payment scheme. In a similar case, almost 400 individual arbitrations regarding wage disputes (out of 5,500 employees who signed on to the original complaint) were brought by employees of Buffalo Wild Wings. This resulted in Buffalo Wild Wings settling with their individual claimants to avoid arbitration. However, these coordinated arbitration filings were organized by plaintiff-side attorneys, making it unlikely that it can be replicated in every instance where a class action lawsuit would have occurred prior to the Epic Systems decision.

=== Racial Disparity ===
Law professor Jean Sternlight has argued that arbitration is fundamentally unfavorable to disempowered members of society because of their lack of clear legal protections, unawareness of their legal rights, comparative difficulty amassing evidence or proving damages, fear of retaliation or deportation, and the initial cost of bringing an arbitration claim. While mandatory arbitration of sexual-assault and sexual-harassment-related conflicts was banned under the Ending Forced Arbitration of Sexual Assault and Sexual Harassment Act (EFASASHA) of 2022, EFASASHA did not extend to racial harassment and discrmination claims, and subsequent legislative attempts to ban forced arbitration of race discrimination claims have been defeated in the Senate.

The Epic Systems decision has since been cited in lower court decisions such as Williams v. Dearborn Motors 1, LLC and Darrington v. Milton Hershey School, which denied class action suits as a remedy to plaintiffs who claimed workplace discrimination.
