= Bissonnette v. LePage Bakeries Park St., LLC =

2024 US Supreme Court case

- Supreme Court of the United States

Argued February 20, 2024 Decided April 12, 2024
- Full case name: Bissonnette v. LePage Bakeries Park St., LLC
- Docket no.: 23-51
- Citations: 601 U.S. 246 (more)
- Argument: Oral argument
- Opinion announcement: Opinion announcement

Holding
- Transportation workers do not need to formally work in the transportation industry to be exempt from the Federal Arbitration Act.

Court membership
- Chief Justice John Roberts Associate Justices Clarence Thomas · Samuel Alito; Sonia Sotomayor · Elena Kagan; Neil Gorsuch · Brett Kavanaugh; Amy Coney Barrett · Ketanji Brown Jackson

Case opinion
- Majority: Roberts, joined by unanimous

Laws applied
- Federal Arbitration Act

Bissonnette v. LePage Bakeries Park St., LLC, 601 U.S. 246 (2024), is a United States Supreme Court case in which the Court held that transportation workers do not need to formally work in the transportation industry to be exempt from the Federal Arbitration Act.

== Legal background ==
In the United States, the Federal Arbitration Act (FAA) generally requires that if parties sign an agreement to resolve disputes through arbitration, they must honor those agreements before bringing their case to state and federal courts, regardless of whether either party no longer wishes to pursue arbitration.

However, Section 1 of the FAA exempts "seamen, railroad employees, [and] any other class of workers engaged in foreign or interstate commerce." In the 2001 case Circuit City Stores, Inc. v. Adams, the Supreme Court limited this exemption to only include sailors, railroad workers, and transportation workers.

In the 2022 case Southwest Airlines Co. v. Saxon, the Supreme Court held that airport cargo loaders and ramp supervisors qualified under this exemption, emphasizing that individuals are categorized by their type of work, rather than the industrial sector of their employer.

== Connecticut District Court ruling ==
Between 2017 and 2018, Neal Bissonnette and Tyler Wojnarowski entered distributor agreements with Flower Foods, working full-time on picking up bakery products from the company's warehouses and distributing them to stores and restaurants across the state of Connecticut. When they sued over unpaid/withheld wages, unpaid overtime wages, and unjust enrichment, Judge Kari A. Dooley of the District Court for the District of Connecticut sided with Flower Foods subsidiary LePage Bakeries Park St. and dismissed the case to force the parties into arbitration.

== Second Circuit ruling ==
In May 2022, Judge Dennis Jacobs wrote a majority opinion for the Court of Appeals for the Second Circuit, joined by District Court Judge Diane Gujarati who sat by designation. Whereas the district court had denied an exemption from the FAA because Bissonnette and Wojnarowski would not be primarily classified as transportation workers, the Second Circuit denied their exemption because their jobs would be classified in the bakery industry.

Judge Rosemary S. Pooler dissented.

== Supreme Court ruling ==
=== Petition for review ===
In an amicus brief, the Constitutional Accountability Center argued against the Second Circuit's ruling by noting that the exemption for sailors was enacted to avoid conflicting with the Shipping Commissioners Act of 1872. Since all sailors qualified for the latter law's dispute-resolution process, it would be illogical to limit the FAA's exemption to only those in the transportation industry, rather than focusing on their individual type of work.

=== Oral arguments ===
During oral arguments held on February 20, 2024, Jennifer D. Bennett of the law firm Gupta Wessler argued on behalf of Bissonnette and Wojnarowski, while Traci L. Lovitt of the law firm Jones Day argued on behalf of LePage Bakeries. Justice Brett Kavanaugh noted that the FAA's third exemption for transportation was likely enacted in anticipation of the airline industry, which Bennett rebutted as unknowable.

Lovitt argued that because Bissonnette and Wojnarowski purchase the baked goods from LePage Bakeries to sell wherever they see fit within Connecticut, they lack the formal obligation to transport goods necessary for being exempt from the FAA. Countering the argument that the FAA exemption for sailors was applied based on the individual's type of work, Lovitt noted that the FAA exemption for railroad workers was enacted to avoid conflicting with the Transportation Act of 1920, which only offered an alternative dispute-resolution process to those employed in the transportation sector.

=== Decision ===
In a unanimous opinion written by Chief Justice John Roberts, the Supreme Court rejected the Second Circuit's reasoning due to the difficulty of determining whether a business' "predominant source of revenue" was the production of its goods or the transportation of them to customers. Furthermore, the Supreme Court rejected LePage Bakeries' reasoning that other early 20th-century statutes on regulation of sailors and railroad workers should be used to limit the FAA's exemption to the transportation sector.

Despite the Supreme Court's decision, Bissonnette and Wojnarowski may still be denied an exemption from arbitration on the grounds that their transportation activity was entirely intrastate activity within Connecticut.
