= Prima Paint Corp. v. Flood & Conklin Manufacturing Co. =

1967 U.S. Supreme Court case on arbitration

Prima Paint Corp. v. Flood & Conklin Mfg. Co.
- Supreme Court of the United States

Argued March 16, 1967 Decided June 12, 1967
- Full case name: Prima Paint Corp. v. Flood & Conklin Manufacturing Co.
- Citations: 388 U.S. 395 (more) 87 S. Ct. 1801; 18 L. Ed. 2d 1270

Case history
- Prior: Defendant's motion for stay to compel arbitration granted in district court; affirmed on appeal by Second Circuit; certiorari granted

Holding
- Challenge to enforceability of contract must be decided by arbitrator when contract has arbitration clause unless challenge is to clause itself. Second Circuit Court of Appeals affirmed.

Court membership
- Chief Justice Earl Warren Associate Justices Hugo Black · William O. Douglas; Tom C. Clark · John M. Harlan II; William J. Brennan Jr. · Potter Stewart; Byron White · Abe Fortas

Case opinions
- Majority: Fortas
- Concurrence: Harlan
- Dissent: Black, joined by Douglas, Stewart

Laws applied
- Federal Arbitration Act, 9 U.S.C. § 1 et seq.

Prima Paint Corp. v. Flood & Conklin Mfg. Co., 388 U.S. 395 (1967), is a United States Supreme Court decision that established what has become known as the "separability principle" in contracts with arbitration clauses. Following an appellate court ruling a decade earlier, it reads the 1925 Federal Arbitration Act (FAA) to require that any challenges to the enforceability of such a contract first be heard by an arbitrator, not a court, unless the claim is that the clause itself is unenforceable.

The case arose from a claim by a New Jersey manufacturer that a Maryland firm had misrepresented itself in a transaction and thus the contract between the two was unenforceable, precluding the arbitration agreed upon in the event of a dispute. Abe Fortas wrote for a 6-3 majority that the FAA was broad enough to require arbitration of all issues save the arbitration clause itself. Hugo Black's dissent called the majority's interpretation overbroad and at odds with Congressional intent in passing the law. He feared it would put legal matters in the hands of arbitrators with little or no legal understanding of it nor duty to follow the law.

In subsequent cases concerning the FAA, the Court has reaffirmed the separability principle and held that the FAA and this reading of it apply to arbitrable contracts under state law, even in cases where the contract is alleged to be illegal or state law provides for administrative dispute resolution. This has been seen as expanding the use of arbitration in contracts in the later 20th century, not only those between businesses but between businesses and consumers as well.

== Background of the case ==
In the early 20th century, businessmen in New York began promoting the idea of legally binding arbitration to resolve disputes as a less costly alternative to litigation. Courts were hostile to the idea, especially in interstate commerce, so in 1925 arbitration advocates persuaded Congress to pass the Federal Arbitration Act (FAA), providing rules and a legal framework for arbitration. Among its provisions was a requirement that parties who had agreed to arbitrate do so before going to court.

The FAA made no impact on the federal courts until the 1958 Second Circuit decision in Robert Lawrence Co. v. Devonshire Fabrics, Inc., which held that the requirement to arbitrate meant that any challenge to the contract itself had to go before an arbitrator, not just disputes over possible breaches of contract. Only the arbitration clause itself could be challenged in court first.

=== Instant dispute ===
Under this framework, in 1964 Prima Paint, of Maryland reached an agreement with Flood & Conklin, a New Jersey paint manufacturer, to purchase the latter's paint business for a percentage of receipts in annual payments of up to $225,000 over a six-year period. In return, Flood & Conklin agreed that its CEO, Jerome Jelin, would personally provide consulting services for Prima and that it would not sell to any of its former customers while the agreement remained in force. Two contracts governed the transaction; both had arbitration clauses.

One week after the contracts were executed, Flood & Conklin declared bankruptcy. In 1965, shortly before the first of its annual payments was due, Prima paid its first installment into an escrow account and told Flood's attorneys that it considered the consulting agreement breached. F & C responded with a notice of intent to arbitrate. Near the end of its permitted response period, Prima instead petitioned the Southern District of New York to rescind the contracts and enjoin Flood & Conklin from arbitration. Since that company had represented itself as solvent during the negotiations only to go bankrupt shortly after signing the deal, Prima argued, the contracts had been fraudulently induced and thus the arbitration clauses by extension could not be enforced.

== Litigation history ==
Flood & Conklin responded by denying the fraud allegations in several affidavits and noting that Prima had enjoyed the benefits of the contract for almost a year without complaint. It could not have been unaware of the bankruptcy proceedings, Flood noted, since it had been present at one of the creditors' committee meetings.

The district court, citing Robert Lawrence, rebuffed Prima and ordered the parties to arbitration. An appeal to the Second Circuit was likewise unsuccessful. Since the First Circuit had reached a different conclusion in a similar case in 1960 that the Supreme Court had declined to hear, the Court accepted Prima's certiorari petition in order to resolve the issue.

Robert Herzog and Martin Coleman argued for the parties on March 12, 1967. The American Arbitration Association filed an amicus curiae brief in favor of Flood & Conklin.

== Decision ==
Abe Fortas wrote for the six-justice majority, and John Marshall Harlan II added a one-sentence concurrence saying that he believed Robert Lawrence was also applicable precedent. Black was joined in a lengthy dissent by Potter Stewart and William O. Douglas, who had written for an eight-justice majority in Bernhardt v. Polygraphic Co, an early reading of the Arbitration Act, which declined to compel arbitration in an employment contract on the grounds that the FAA applied only to contracts involving admiralty or commerce

=== Majority ===
After reiterating the case history, Fortas considered the case in light of Bernhardt. Since the consulting agreement was inexorably tied to the transfer of business assets from Flood to Prima, it was covered. "There could not be a clearer case of a contract evidencing a transaction in interstate commerce", he wrote, responding to the dissent's suggestion that the language should be more narrowly interpreted.

The language of Section 4 of the Act was clear, he continued, that only explicit challenges to the arbitration clause or its inducement were to be properly put before a court in the first instance. "[I]t is inconceivable that Congress intended the rule to differ depending upon which party to the arbitration agreement first invokes the assistance of a federal court." Finally, he addressed the constitutionality of the Court's holding in light of Erie Railroad Co. v. Tompkins, which held that the federal courts cannot create a federal common law and must defer to the prevailing state interpretations in substantive matters.

The question in this case, however, is not whether Congress may fashion federal substantive rules to govern questions arising in simple diversity cases. Rather, the question is whether Congress may prescribe how federal courts are to conduct themselves with respect to subject matter over which Congress plainly has power to legislate. The answer to that can only be in the affirmative.

=== Dissent ===
Black's four-part dissent was longer than the majority opinion he responded to. He took issue with every aspect of Fortas's reasoning.

In his introductory paragraph, he was blunt:

The Court holds, what is to me fantastic, that the legal issue of a contract's voidness because of fraud is to be decided by persons designated to arbitrate factual controversies arising out of a valid contract between the parties. And the arbitrators who the Court holds are to adjudicate the legal validity of the contract need not even be lawyers, and in all probability will be nonlawyers, wholly unqualified to decide legal issues, and even if qualified to apply the law, not bound to do so. I am by no means sure that thus forcing a person to forgo his opportunity to try his legal issues in the courts where, unlike the situation in arbitration, he may have a jury trial and right to appeal, is not a denial of due process of law. I am satisfied, however, that Congress did not impose any such procedures in the Arbitration Act.

He noted that Congress had explicitly not included in the FAA the language it normally used to apply to all commerce, leading him to doubt that the arbitration clause in the consulting agreement was covered by it. Nor did the Act provide as clear an answer as the majority claimed as to what sort of challenges to the formation or execution of the contract might necessarily be first heard by a court. And lastly the majority had not provided sufficient justification for its reading of Bernhardt and Erie Railroad. "The Court approves", he protested, "a rule which is not only contrary to state law, but contrary to the intention of the parties and to accepted principles of contract law — a rule which indeed elevates arbitration provisions above all other contractual provisions"

His second and third sections went into great detail about the legislative history of the FAA, quoting from Montana Senator Thomas J. Walsh's statements about it during hearings and those of the American Bar Association's lobbyists, who had helped draft and pass it, suggesting that it was not meant to be interpreted as the majority and the Second Circuit had. He noted that New York's state Arbitration Act, on which the federal law was based, explicitly provided that a claim of misrepresentation in a contract with an arbitration clause was to be heard by a judge. "Thus, 35 years after the passage of the Arbitration Act, the Second Circuit completely rewrote it", in Robert Lawrence, whose reasoning the Court was now accepting.

"If Prima's allegations are true," Black concluded,"the sum total of what the Court does here is to force Prima to arbitrate a contract which is void and unenforceable before arbitrators who are given the power to make final legal determinations of their own jurisdiction, not even subject to effective review by the highest court in the land."

== Legacy ==
Prima Paint established in federal jurisprudence what became known as the "separability" or "severability" principle in contracts with arbitration clauses, under which a legal fiction is created that the clause itself constitutes a contract separate from the underlying, or "container", contract. This is similar to the principle of compétence compétence in international arbitration, under which the arbitrator or arbitrators are presumed competent to decide the limits of their own jurisdiction.

Starting in the mid-1980s, the Court has greatly expanded the reach of Prima Paint in later cases. Since some of these have applied to the expanded use of arbitration clauses in contracts of adhesion between companies and consumers, some consumer advocates and legal scholars have criticized the decision as the inadvertent opening wedge of an assault on the right to litigate, and a weakening of state contract law and the Erie Railroad principle of deference to state common law. Defenders of the decision have responded that it simply began bringing the U.S. more in line with international arbitration practice, helping American companies compete in a global economy. One, Alan Rau, has also argued that it is justified not just by the Arbitration Act but by general principles of contract law.

=== Subsequent jurisprudence ===
The Court would not consider a case involving the FAA for another 17 years. When it did, in Southland Corp. v. Keating, then-Chief Justice Warren Burger wrote for a 7-2 majority that not only upheld Prima Paint but held that the law applied to arbitration clauses in contracts executed under state law as well. Justices Rehnquist and O'Connor dissented, as they would in subsequent cases where the court upheld that decision.

That increased the use of such clauses, as well as legal challenges to them. In the 1990s and 2000s (decade), the Court has compelled arbitration even when the time frame to raise a claim is alleged to have lapsed, the contract has been alleged to be illegal under state law or where state law vested dispute resolution authority in a state agency. Clarence Thomas was the lone dissenter from these two opinions, believing as Rehnquist and O'Connor did that the FAA does not apply to contracts executed under state law.

When it comes to contracts where one party disputed whether it had been properly formed, rather than the validity of a formed contract, the Court has been willing to let a court decide the issue. Justice Stephen Breyer wrote for a unanimous court in First Options v. Kaplan that upheld a district-court decision reversing an arbitration award where it was not clear that the respondents had agreed to submit the arbitrability of the question to the arbitrator.

=== Commentary and criticism ===
Prima Paint attracted little analysis and commentary in its time, but as it became the foundation for the Court's expansion of the scope of the Arbitration Act and its subsequent application to contracts between consumers and businesses as well as among businesses, its reasoning has been the subject of more legal papers. Critics have reiterated Black's concerns in focusing on how the later decisions have exposed fundamental flaws in Prima Paint, while defenders have found them to reinforce its fundamental soundness.

Labor lawyer Zeb-Michael Curtin of the Minneapolis firm Dorsey & Whitney says the Court "muddied the clear language of [the FAA]" and "enabled results contrary to the intentions of the framers of the FAA" by embracing the separability doctrine. Richard Barnes of the University of Mississippi has argued that, contrary to Fortas's assertions, Prima Paint and its progeny have created fundamental problems with the Erie Railroad doctrine. "The FAA has become a substantive rule of a federal common law applied in virtually all settings and levels of the state and federal systems", he says.

Richard Reuben of Missouri law school, a longtime critic of mandatory arbitration, calls Prima Paint's adoption of the separability doctrine "a perhaps unparalleled display of judicial sophistry". He fears it can have negative consequences for society as a whole: "By denying citizens the right to a day in court, arbitration imposed through mandatory processes and separability fosters cynicism and distrust in the rule of law, undermining its legitimacy."

Defenders of the decision and separability have said that it is necessary for arbitration clauses to have any force, otherwise parties would be able to avoid them too easily by filing suits on any number of grounds. Those whose practice involves arbitrating disputes that are international in scope have credited it with bringing U.S. arbitration law closer to European norms, helping American companies compete and making the U.S. a viable venue for arbitration.

In several papers, Alan Scott Rau of the University of Texas law school has gone to a greater extent than Fortas did in grounding Prima Paint and the separability doctrine. He notes that challenges to the arbitration clause are often inseparable from the underlying claim, and that some public policy objectives may be better served by allowing the case to be heard by an arbitrator first. Conversely, he also notes that some challenges to a contract's formation necessarily include a challenge to the arbitration clause in any event, contrary to some recent lower-court decisions.

== See also ==
- List of United States Supreme Court cases, volume 388
- Kompetenz-kompetenz
