= Prime Inc. =

American trucking company

New Prime Inc.
- Type: Private
- Industry: Freight transport
- Founded: 1970
- Headquarters: Springfield, Missouri, U.S.
- Website: www.primeinc.com

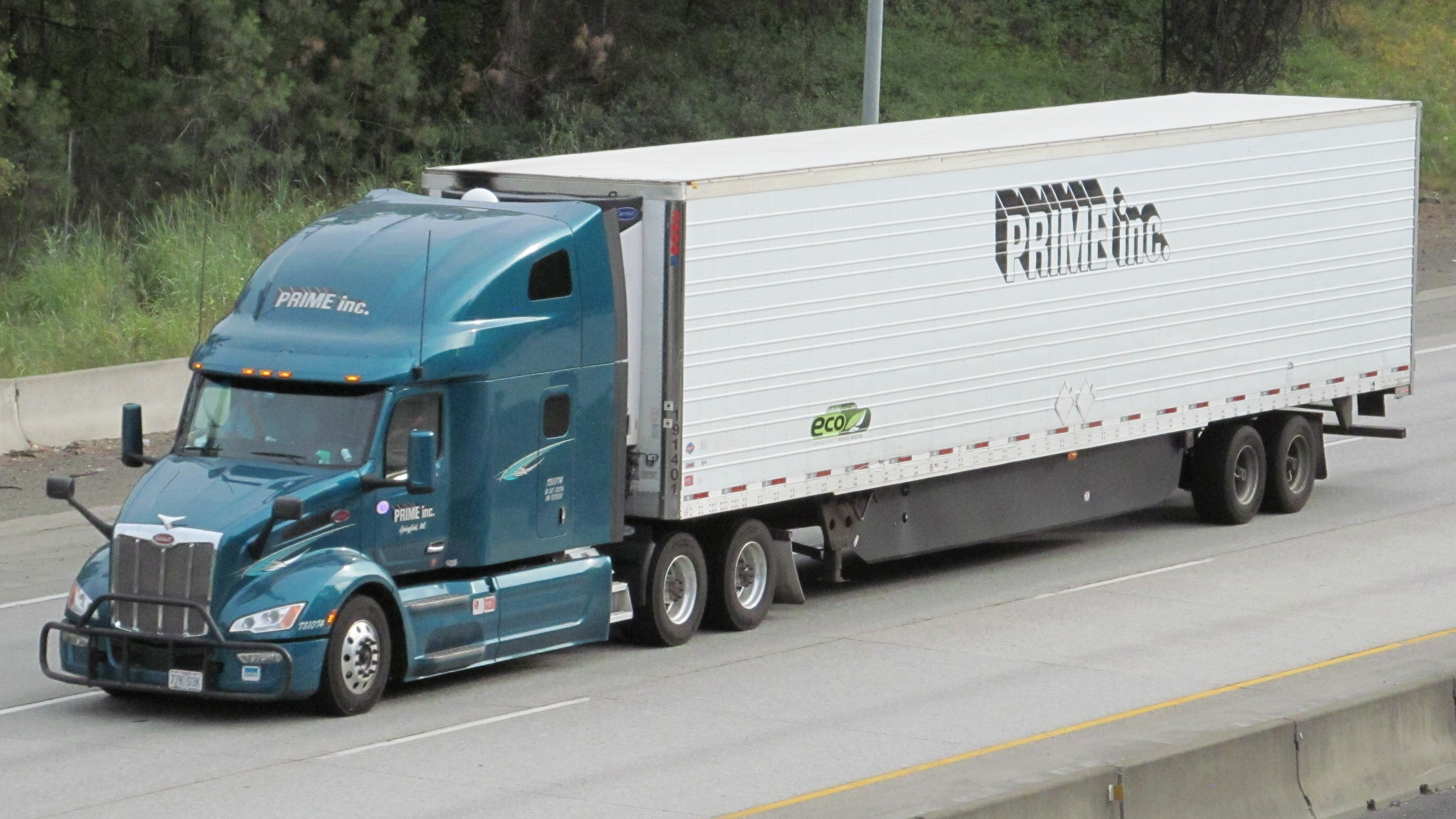
A Prime semi-truck in 2024

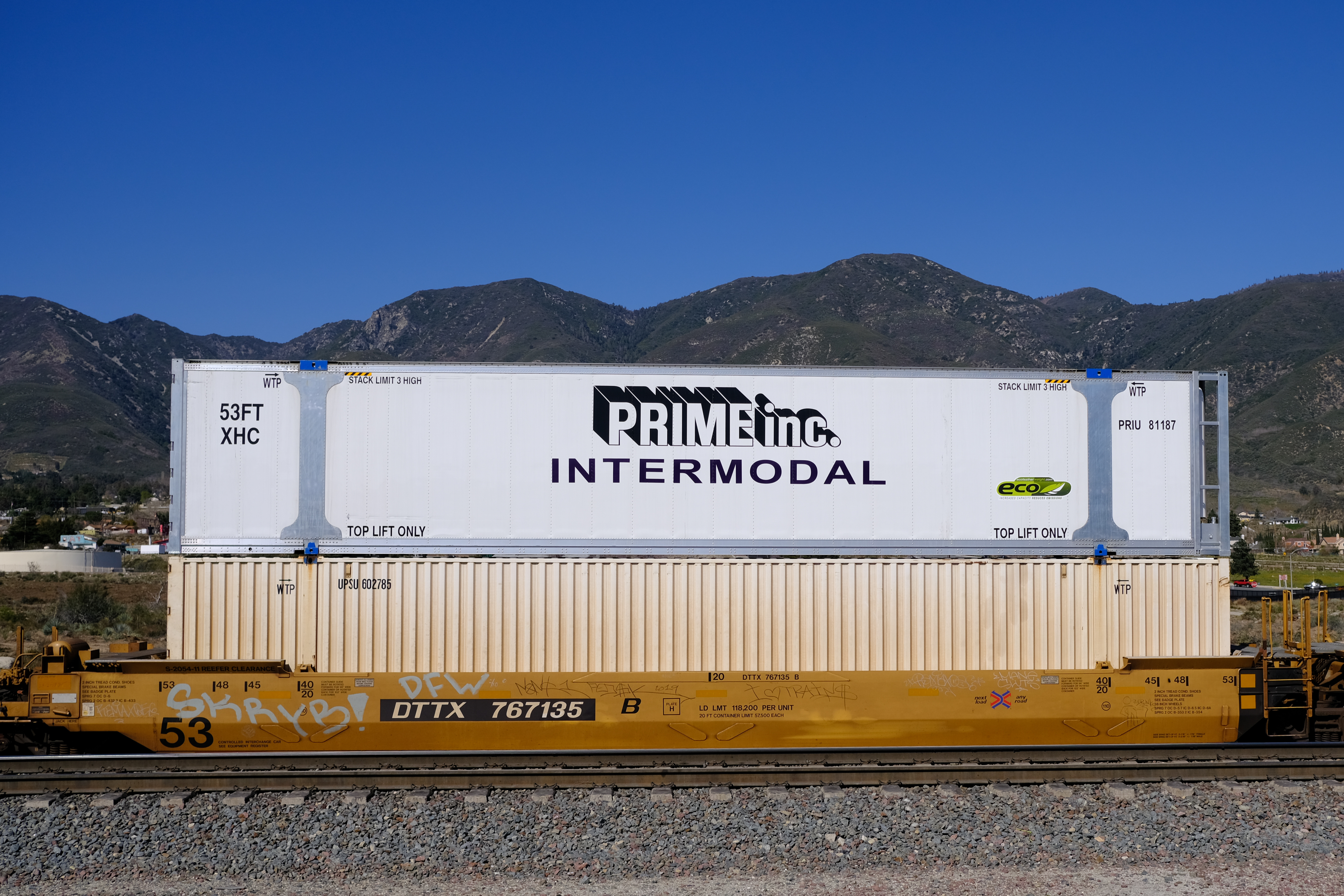
A Prime intermodal container in 2021

New Prime Inc., doing business as Prime Inc., is an American trucking company based in Springfield, Missouri. The company operates across the United States and Canada and provides a variety of freight transport services, including refrigerated, flatbed, tanker, and intermodal.

== History ==
Prime Inc. was founded in 1970 by Robert E. Low in Urbana, Missouri. The company moved its headquarters to Springfield, Missouri, in 1980.

By 1990, Prime employed 1,250 drivers and maintained a fleet of 680 trucks. The company outfitted its fleet with satellite communications and tracking equipment from Qualcomm in 1992 at a cost of $4.3 million.

In 2004, Prime implemented a policy of only pairing new drivers with trainers of the same gender in response to complaints of sexual harassment by female trainees. The Equal Employment Opportunity Commission (EEOC) filed a lawsuit against the company in 2011 which alleged that the policy was discriminatory, as a lack of female trainers made it more difficult for women to complete training. The company reached a settlement agreement with the EEOC in 2016, agreeing to pay more than $3.11 million in compensatory damages.

In January 2019, the United States Supreme Court issued a decision against the company in New Prime Inc. v. Oliveira, a case considering how the Federal Arbitration Act applies to transportation workers who are classified as independent contractors. In 2020, Prime reached a settlement agreement in that case and a related lawsuit, Haworth et al v. New Prime Inc., agreeing to pay out $28 million to a group of drivers (largely independent owner-operators) who said they were improperly compensated by the company.

Prime filed a lawsuit against Amazon in July 2019, stating that the company's use of the Amazon Prime logo on its semi-trailers was "confusingly similar" to Prime's own branding. Prime sought injunctive relief against Amazon for the alleged damage to its business. The lawsuit was dismissed in 2022 after the two companies reached a confidential settlement agreement.

The company launched a hopper division in 2024, with an initial order of 25 hopper trailers for the transport of corn, grain, and other bulk commodities.

== Operations ==
Prime Inc. is a privately held company that operates across the United States and Canada. It provides a variety of freight transport services, including refrigerated transport, flatbed transport, tanker transport, and intermodal transport. The company employs about 1,700 drivers and 7,400 independent contractor drivers as of 2024.
