= Southwest Airlines Co. v. Saxon =

- Supreme Court of the United States

Argued March 28, 2022 Decided June 6, 2022
- Full case name: Southwest Airlines Co. v. Latrice Saxon
- Docket no.: 21-309
- Citations: 596 U.S. 450 (more)
- Argument: Oral argument

Holding
- Airplane cargo loaders and ramp supervisors are exempt from the Federal Arbitration Act.

Court membership
- Chief Justice John Roberts Associate Justices Clarence Thomas · Stephen Breyer; Samuel Alito · Sonia Sotomayor; Elena Kagan · Neil Gorsuch; Brett Kavanaugh · Amy Coney Barrett

Case opinion
- Majority: Thomas, joined by Roberts, Breyer, Alito, Sotomayor, Kagan, Gorsuch, Kavanaugh
- Barrett took no part in the consideration or decision of the case.

Laws applied
- Federal Arbitration Act

Southwest Airlines Co. v. Saxon, 596 U.S. 450 (2022), was a United States Supreme Court case related to the scope of the Federal Arbitration Act, in which the Court unanimously held that cargo loaders and ramp supervisors employed at airports are exempt from the Federal Arbitration Act.

== Background ==
Section 1 of the Federal Arbitration Act, 9 U.S.C. § 1, exempts "contracts of employment of seamen, railroad employees, or any other class of workers engaged in foreign or interstate commerce" from its scope. In its 2001 Circuit City Stores, Inc. v. Adams decision, the Supreme Court of the United States held the residual clause of Section 1 applies only to "transportation workers."

Latrice Saxon was a ramp supervisor for Southwest Airlines who directed the loading and unloading of cargo from the airline's flights. Saxon filed a lawsuit under the Fair Labor Standards Act of 1938 disputing Southwest's handling of overtime pay for ramp supervisors. The airline invoked an arbitration clause in Saxon's employment contract, and the district court dismissed her suit on that basis, finding that the Federal Arbitration Act did apply to her contract. The United States Court of Appeals for the Seventh Circuit reversed, holding Saxon was a transportation worker and her job involved her working in interstate commerce. Southwest filed a petition for a writ of certiorari.

== Supreme Court ==
Due to the ruling in the Seventh Circuit contradicting another similar ruling in the United States Court of Appeals for the Fifth Circuit. Certiorari was granted in the case on December 10, 2021. Oral arguments were held on March 28, 2022. On June 6, 2022, the Supreme Court affirmed the Seventh Circuit in a unanimous decision.
