= Vaden v. Discover Bank =

- Supreme Court of the United States

Decided March 9, 2009
- Full case name: Vaden v. Discover Bank
- Citations: 556 U.S. 49 (more)

Holding
- A federal court may consider an FAA §4 petition's underlying controversy to determine whether the controversy "arises under" federal law; however, the underlying controversy must satisfy the well-pleaded complaint rule for the federal court to have jurisdiction over the case.

Court membership
- Chief Justice John Roberts Associate Justices John P. Stevens · Antonin Scalia; Anthony Kennedy · David Souter; Clarence Thomas · Ruth Bader Ginsburg; Stephen Breyer · Samuel Alito

Case opinions
- Majority: Ginsberg, joined by Scalia, Kennedy, Souter, Thomas
- Concur/dissent: Roberts, joined by Stevens, Breyer, and Alito

Laws applied
- Federal Arbitration Act

Vaden v. Discover Bank, 556 U.S. 49 (2009), was a United States Supreme Court case in which the court held that a federal court may consider a Federal Arbitration Act §4 petition's underlying controversy to determine whether the controversy "arises under" federal law; however, the underlying controversy must satisfy the well-pleaded complaint rule for the federal court to have jurisdiction over the case.

== Background ==
Section 4 of the Federal Arbitration Act (FAA) authorizes a United States district court to entertain a petition to compel arbitration if the court would have jurisdiction, "save for [the arbitration] agreement," over "a suit arising out of the controversy between the parties."

Discover Bank's servicing affiliate filed a complaint in Maryland state court to recover past-due charges from one of its credit cardholders, Vaden. Discover's pleading presented a claim arising solely under state law. Vaden answered and counterclaimed, alleging that Discover's finance charges, interest, and late fees violated state law. Invoking an arbitration clause in its cardholder agreement with Vaden, Discover then filed a §4 petition in the federal District Court to compel arbitration of Vaden's counterclaims. The District Court ordered arbitration.

On Vaden's initial appeal, the Fourth Circuit Court of Appeals remanded the case for the District Court to determine whether it had subject-matter jurisdiction over Discover's §4 petition pursuant to 28 U. S. C. §1331, which gives federal courts jurisdiction over cases "arising under" federal law. The Fourth Circuit instructed the District Court to conduct this inquiry by "looking through" the §4 petition to the substantive controversy between the parties. With Vaden conceding that her state-law counterclaims were completely preempted by §27 of the Federal Deposit Insurance Act (FDIA), the District Court expressly held that it had federal-question jurisdiction and again ordered arbitration. The Fourth Circuit then affirmed. The Court of Appeals recognized that, in Holmes Group, Inc. v. Vornado Air Circulation Systems, Inc., the Supreme Court held that federal-question jurisdiction depends on the contents of a well-pleaded complaint and may not be predicated on counterclaims. The Fourth Circuit concluded, however, that the complete preemption doctrine was paramount and thus overrided the well-pleaded complaint rule.

== Opinion of the court ==
The Supreme Court issued an opinion on March 9, 2009.

== Later developments ==
The look-through doctrine was limited and clarified by subsequent Supreme Court cases, including Badgerow v. Walters (2022) and Jules v. Andre Balazs Properties (2026).

In Badgerow, the Court ruled that parties can't use Section 4 to qualify for federal jurisdiction in "freestanding" cases. That is, even if the underlying dispute involves federal matters that would give courts jurisdiction, the dispute alone doesn't lead to federal jurisdiction. "Freestanding" means that after arbitration, the parties went to federal court only to contest or confirm the arbitration outcome.

Then, in Jules, the Court clarified that if parties first went to federal court (and established federal jurisdiction) before arbitration, then the parties did not need to establish federal jurisdiction again after arbitration, in order to confirm or contest an arbitration award. Rather, before arbitration, the federal court could issue a stay for the court proceedings (appropriate per the Court's ruling in Smith v Spizzirri), and then "resume" proceedings after arbitration without new grounds for jurisdiction.
