= Henry Schein, Inc. v. Archer & White Sales, Inc. =

- Supreme Court of the United States

Argued October 29, 2018 Decided January 8, 2019
- Full case name: Henry Schein, Inc. v. Archer & White Sales, Inc.
- Docket no.: 17-1272
- Citations: 586 U.S. ___ (more) 139 S. Ct. 524; 202 L. Ed. 2d 480; 2019 U.S. LEXIS 566; 2019 WL 122164
- Argument: Oral argument

Case history
- Prior: Motion to compel arbitration granted, Archer & White Sales, Inc. v. Henry Schein, Inc., No. 2:12-cv-00572, 2013 U.S. Dist. LEXIS 201338; motion for reconsideration granted, No. 2:12-cv-00572, 2016 U.S. Dist. LEXIS 169245 (E.D. Tex. Dec. 7, 2016); affirmed, 878 F.3d 488 (5th Cir. 2017); cert. granted, 138 S. Ct. 2678 (2018).

Holding
- The Fifth Circuit's "wholly groundless" exception to a valid delegation of arbitrability is inconsistent with the Federal Arbitration Act. Where parties have clearly delegated decisions on arbitrability to an arbitrator, courts must defer to the arbitrator on those questions.

Court membership
- Chief Justice John Roberts Associate Justices Clarence Thomas · Ruth Bader Ginsburg; Stephen Breyer · Samuel Alito; Sonia Sotomayor · Elena Kagan; Neil Gorsuch · Brett Kavanaugh

Case opinion
- Majority: Kavanaugh, joined by unanimous

Laws applied
- Federal Arbitration Act

Henry Schein, Inc. v. Archer & White Sales, Inc., 586 U.S. ___ (2019), was a case decided by the Supreme Court of the United States on January 8, 2019. The case decided the question of whether a court may disregard a valid delegation of arbitrability—a contract provision stating that an arbitrator should decide whether a dispute is subject to arbitration—when the argument in favor of arbitration is "wholly groundless." In a unanimous (9-0) opinion written by Justice Brett Kavanaugh, the court sided with petitioner Henry Schein, Inc., holding that the "wholly groundless" exception to arbitrability violates the Federal Arbitration Act (9 U.S.C. § 1 et seq.), and therefore a valid delegation of arbitrability should be honored even if a court believes the argument for arbitration to be "wholly groundless." It was Justice Kavanaugh's first Supreme Court opinion.

== Background ==
In the decades preceding this case, the U.S. Supreme Court issued a number decisions that were widely seen as favoring the use of arbitration through an expansive reading of the Federal Arbitration Act (9 U.S.C. § 1 et seq.). By the end of the twentieth century, arbitration, once disfavored by courts as an inferior form of dispute resolution, had become commonplace. Arbitration agreements and awards are now routinely honored by federal courts. Disputes about arbitration are still common in United States courts, however, for two primary reasons: First, the right to a jury trial is fundamental in the United States, so courts need confirmation that individuals have freely agreed to relinquish that right before compelling arbitration. Second, arbitration is believed by many to favor large organizations and "repeat players" who can force their counterparts (sometimes consumers or employees) into arbitration agreements through their superior bargaining power. These concerns, along with other disagreements about whether parties had agreed arbitrate certain issues, have given rise to court decisions outlining fine-grained distinctions about which disputes are subject to arbitration. Henry Schein, Inc. v. Archer & White Sales, Inc. further clarified these questions by eliminating one possible exception to the Supreme Court's previous arbitrability decisions.

== Facts ==
Archer & White Sales, a small dental distribution business, entered into a contract with Pelton & Crane (a Danaher company) to buy Pelton and Crane dental equipment. Their sales contract included the following language: "Any dispute arising under or related to this Agreement (except for actions seeking injunctive relief...), shall be resolved by binding arbitration in accordance with the arbitration rules of the American Arbitration Association [(AAA)]." Eventually, the business relationship deteriorated, and Archer & White sued Danaher and Henry Schein for violations of antitrust law. Henry Schein moved to compel arbitration based on the arbitration clause in the sales contract, even though they were not a signatory to the Pelton and Crane contract, invoking the Federal Arbitration Act. Archer & White argued that their dispute was not subject to arbitration because one of the remedies sought was injunctive relief.

== Legal issues ==
=== Delegation of Arbitrability ===
Henry Schein argued, based on the language in the contract, that the parties agreed to have the arbitrator decide whether the dispute should be decided through arbitration. The contract contained an agreement to arbitrate under the rules of AAA, and the AAA rules contain a "competence-competence" clause, allowing an arbitral tribunal to decide arbitrability. Thus, by agreeing to the AAA rules, the parties had agreed to delegate the question of arbitrability to the arbitrator. Archer & White responded that this was not a clear delegation of authority because their arbitration clause included "cut-outs"—specific types of claims that they did not agree to subject to arbitration. The Fifth Circuit Court of Appeals had previously held that very similar provisions incorporating the AAA rules were clear delegations of arbitrability, and it had even held that similar cut-outs did not defeat the effect of these provisions. In this case, however, the Fifth Circuit believed that the intersection of the particular cut-outs at issue and grounds for the underlying dispute made the question of delegation difficult. Finding that the case could be resolved through an exception, they declined to answer the question of whether the delegation was valid.

=== Wholly Groundless Exception ===
Archer & White advanced an alternative argument that even if the delegation was valid, the argument for arbitration was "wholly groundless." The Fifth Circuit Court of Appeals, along with the Sixth Circuit and the Federal Circuit, had previously held that even if parties clearly delegate arbitrability to an arbitrator, a court can decide refuse to let the case go to arbitration if the argument for arbitration is "wholly groundless." The trial court ruled for Archer & White on the "wholly groundless" exception, finding that no reasonable arbitrator could find this case subject to arbitration, and therefore the question of whether the parties delegated the arbitrability decision to an arbitrator was irrelevant. The Fifth Circuit affirmed that decision.

Henry Schein appealed the ruling to the United States Supreme Court, arguing that the "wholly groundless" exception violates the Federal Arbitration Act. Since the Fifth Circuit declined to rule on whether the delegation of arbitrability was valid, only ruling on the "wholly groundless" exception was appealed to the Supreme Court.

== Decision of the Court ==
The Supreme Court heard oral argument on the case on October 29, 2018. At oral argument, some of the justices expressed concern at the suggestion by counsel for Henry Schein that a dispute should be sent to an arbitrator when it was clear that the arbitrator lacked jurisdiction on the dispute. But even more concern was shown for the position of Archer & White that a judge could simply skip the step of determining whether the parties delegated arbitrability by making a "wholly groundless" determination about the merits of arbitrability. Commentators predicted that the Court would strike down the "wholly groundless" exception.

The opinion in the case was released on January 8, 2019. It was a unanimous (9-0) opinion written by Justice Brett Kavanaugh, his first opinion from the Supreme Court bench. The opinion was based on a series of previous Supreme Court decisions. In Rent-A-Center v. Jackson, 561 U.S. 63, the Court held that parties could agree to delegate decisions on specific issues to arbitrators, and that courts must respect those delegations. In AT&T Technologies, Inc. v. Commc'n Workers of Am., 475 U.S. 643, the Court explicitly noted that parties could delegate arbitrability, but held that the arbitrability determination should typically be made by a court. In the AT&T case, the Court wrote: "...the question of arbitrability...is undeniably an issue for judicial determination. Unless the parties clearly and unmistakably provide otherwise, the question of whether the parties agreed to arbitrate is to be decided by the court, not the arbitrator." In First Options of Chicago, Inc. v. Kaplan, 514 U.S. 938, the Court again held that parties could delegate arbitrability, and reinforced the "clear and unmistakable" standard.

The slip opinion for Henry Schein, Inc. v. Archer & White Sales, Inc.

In Henry Schein, the Supreme Court reiterated these previous decisions, holding that courts must respect clear and unmistakable delegations of arbitrability to an arbitrator, and may not circumvent those delegations by weighing the merits of the arbitrability question itself. It pointed to relevant language in the AT&T case, stating, "We have held that a court may not 'rule on the potential merits of the underlying' claim that is assigned by contract to an arbitrator, 'even if it appears to the court to be frivolous.' Reaffirming these cases, the Court struck down the Fifth Circuit's "wholly groundless" exception to the delegation of arbitrability to an arbitrator.

== Implications and Subsequent Cases ==
Henry Schein clarified a split in the federal courts of appeals about the arbitrability of disputes. Only the courts of appeals for the Fifth, Sixth, and Federal Circuits had previously recognized the "wholly groundless" exception to an otherwise valid delegation of arbitrability. These appellate courts believed it would be wasteful and absurd to send a dispute to an arbitrator only to have the arbitrator send the parties back to court because they lack jurisdiction. The Supreme Court resolved this split by eliminating this exception. In Henry Schein, the Court stressed that courts must first determine who is authorized to determine arbitrability, as outlined by AT&T and First Options. Courts may not skip that step by "peeking" at the merits of the arbitrability question and deciding that the claim in favor of arbitration is "wholly groundless."

=== Subsequent Cases ===
In the months following the decision, Henry Schein was cited by several courts as strengthening the right of parties to delegate arbitrability to an arbitrator. The narrow holding in Henry Schein gave rise to some confusion; some observers surmised the Court had determined the arbitration clause incorporating AAA rules to be a valid delegation of arbitrability. At least one federal case (Charlie's Project, LLC v. T2B, LLC) cited Henry Schein as supporting this conclusion, comparing the Henry Schein clause with its AAA incorporation in Henry Schein to the AAA arbitration clause case at hand in concluding that it was a clear delegation of arbitrability to the arbitrator. In Henry Schein, however, the Court explicitly stated, "We express no view about whether the contract at issue in this case in fact delegated the arbitrability question to an arbitrator." The question of whether these general adoptions of arbitration rules qualified as valid delegations of arbitrability was not addressed by the Supreme Court.

=== Unanswered Questions ===
Some commentators have noted the Court's failure in Henry Schein to answer these broader question about when a delegation clause is "clear and unmistakeable." Arbitration clauses often incorporate the rules of an arbitration organization (like AAA), and those rules generally include a competence-competence clause. Whether these types of clauses qualify as "clear and unmistakeable" delegations of authority under First Options is hotly contested. Many lower federal courts have found such clauses to be valid delegations under AT&T and First Options, but the American Law Institute (ALI) has voiced their opinion that they do not qualify as such. The ALI argues that although these types of clauses grant jurisdictional authority to an arbitrator, they do not exclude or disclaim the authority of courts to rule on the question, and therefore courts may still rule on arbitrability. In the Henry Schein case, this question was addressed by the district court and the Fifth Circuit, but the Fifth Circuit ultimately declined to make a final ruling on the question and the issue was not addressed by the Supreme Court. Given the prevalence of these clauses in arbitration agreements, arbitration experts anticipate that the Supreme Court will eventually address the question they left unanswered in Henry Schein.

=== Improper Certiorari ===
In Henry Schein, Inc. v. Archer and White Sales, Inc., 592 U.S. ___ (2021), the Court dismissed certiorari as improvidently granted.
