= 2012 term per curiam opinions of the Supreme Court of the United States =

The Supreme Court of the United States handed down six per curiam opinions during its 2012 term, which began October 1, 2012 and concluded October 6, 2013.

Because per curiam decisions are issued from the Court as an institution, these opinions all lack the attribution of authorship or joining votes to specific justices. All justices on the Court at the time the decision was handed down are assumed to have participated and concurred unless otherwise noted.

== Court membership ==
Chief Justice: John Roberts

Associate Justices: Antonin Scalia, Anthony Kennedy, Clarence Thomas, Ruth Bader Ginsburg, Stephen Breyer, Samuel Alito, Sonia Sotomayor, Elena Kagan

== Lefemine v. Wideman ==
- Full caption: Steven Lefemine, DBA Columbia Christians For Life v. Dan Wideman et al.
- Citations: 568 U.S. 1
- Prior history: Award of attorneys fees denied, sub nom. Lefemine v. Davis, 732 F. Supp. 2d 614 (S.C. 2010); aff'd, 672 F. 3d 292 (4th Cir. 2012)
- Laws applied: 42 U.S.C. § 1988 (Civil Rights Attorney's Fees Award Act of 1976)
- Full text of the opinion: Wikisource official slip opinion · Justia

568 U.S. 1
Decided November 5, 2012.
Fourth Circuit vacated and remanded.

The Supreme Court vacated a Fourth Circuit ruling that a civil rights plaintiff who had been awarded an injunction, but not monetary damages, was not entitled to attorney's fees as a "prevailing plaintiff" under 42 U.S.C. §1988. The Court ruled that the plaintiff was indeed a "prevailing plaintiff" within the meaning of 42 U.S.C. §1988, "[b]ecause the injunction ordered the defendant officials to change their behavior in a way that directly benefited the plaintiff", and that the plaintiff was therefore entitled to attorney's fees.

== Nitro-Lift Technologies, L. L. C. v. Howard ==
- Full caption: Nitro-Lift Technologies, L. L. C. v. Eddie Lee Howard et al.
- Citations: 568 U.S. 17
- Prior history: Dismissed, Okla. Dist. Ct., Johnston Cty.; reversed, 273 P. 3d 20 (Okla. 2011)
- Laws applied: 9 U.S.C. § 1 et seq. (Federal Arbitration Act)
- Full text of the opinion: Wikisource official slip opinion · Justia

568 U.S. 17
Decided November 26, 2012.
Supreme Court of Oklahoma vacated and remanded.

The U.S. Supreme Court vacated the Oklahoma Supreme Court's ruling that a noncompetition covenant in an employment contract was unenforceable under state law, where the contract as a whole was subject to arbitration. Under the Federal Arbitration Act, the Court wrote, "it is for the arbitrator to decide in the first instance whether the covenants not to compete are valid as a matter of applicable state law."

== Marshall v. Rodgers ==
- Full caption: John Marshall, Warden v. Otis Lee Rodgers
- Citations: 569 U.S. 58
- Prior history: Petition denied, (C.D. Cal. 2010); rev'd, Rodgers v. Marshall, 678 F.3d 1149 (9th Cir. 2012)
- Laws applied: U.S. Const. amend. VI
- Full text of the opinion: official slip opinion · Justia

569 U.S. 58
Decided April 1, 2013.
In light of the tension between the Sixth Amendment's guarantee of the right to counsel at all critical stages of the criminal process and its concurrent promise of a constitutional right to proceed without counsel when a criminal defendant voluntarily and intelligently elects to do so, it cannot be said that California’s approach is contrary to or an unreasonable application of the general standards established by the Supreme Court's assistance-of-counsel cases. Because the habeas petition needed to be supported by clearly established law, the court denied it.

Ninth Circuit reversed and remanded.

== Boyer v. Louisiana ==
- Full caption: Jonathan Edward Boyer v. Louisiana
- Citations: 569 U.S. 238
- Prior history: Conviction affirmed, 56 So. 3d 1119 (La. Ct. App. 2011); review denied, 78 So. 3d 138 (La. 2012); cert. granted, 568 U.S. 936 (2012)
- Laws applied: U.S. Const. amend. VI
- Full text of the opinion: official slip opinion · Oral Argument · Cornell · Oyez

569 U.S. 238
Argued January 14, 2013.
Decided April 29, 2013.
The Court dismissed the writ of certiorari as improvidently granted.

Alito filed a concurrence, joined by Scalia and Thomas. Sotomayor filed a dissent, joined by Ginsburg, Breyer, and Kagan.

== Nevada v. Jackson ==
- Full caption: Nevada, et al. v. Calvin O'Neil Jackson
- Citations: 569 U.S. 505
- Prior history: Petition denied, D. Nev.; rev'd, Jackson v. Nevada, 688 F.3d 1091 (9th Cir. 2012)
- Subsequent history: Jackson v. Nevada, 723 F.3d 1114 (9th Cir. 2013)
- Laws applied: U.S. Const. amend. VI; Nev. Rev. Stat. §50.085(3) (2011)
- Full text of the opinion: official slip opinion · FindLaw

569 U.S. 505
Decided June 3, 2013.
In a trial for rape, the defendant sought to introduce extrinsic evidence to impeach the accuser by showing that they had accused the defendant in the past. The exception to the rape-shield rule required the defendant to give notice of this intention so that the court could hold a hearing about it. No decision of the Supreme Court clearly establishes that the notice requirement is unconstitutional, and the Supreme Court has never held that the Confrontation Clause entitles a criminal defendant to introduce extrinsic evidence for impeachment. Because the habeas petition needed to be supported by clearly established law, the court denied it.

Ninth Circuit reversed and remanded.

== Ryan v. Schad ==
- Full caption: Charles L. Ryan, Director, Arizona Department of Corrections v. Edward Harold Schad
- Citations: 570 U.S. 521
- Prior history: Petition denied, sub nom. Schad v. Schriro, 454 F. Supp. 2d 897 (D. Ariz. 2006); rev'd in part, aff'd in part, remanded, sub nom. Schad v. Ryan, 606 F. 3d 1022 (9th Cir. 2010); vacated and remanded, 563 U.S. ___ (2011); aff'd, 671 F.3d 708 (9th Cir. 2011); motion for rehearing and for rehearing en banc denied, No. 07–99005 (9th Cir. Feb. 28, 2012); motion to vacate judgment denied, No. 07–99005 (9th Cir. July 27, 2012); cert. denied, 568 U.S. ___ (2012); petition for rehearing denied, 568 U.S. ___ (2013); stay of mandate denied, No. 07–99005 (9th Cir. Feb. 1, 2013); remanded, No. 07–99005, 2013 WL 791610 (9th Cir. Feb. 26, 2013); stay of execution granted, No. 07–99005 (9th Cir. Mar. 1, 2013); motion for rehearing and for rehearing en banc denied, 709 F.3d 855 (9th Cir. 2013); application to vacate stay of execution denied, 568 U.S. ___ (2013)
- Laws applied: Fed. R. App. P. 41(d)(2)(D)
- Full text of the opinion: official slip opinion · Cornell

570 U.S. 521
Decided June 24, 2013.
The Ninth Circuit abused its discretion when it neglected to issue its mandate after the Supreme Court denied certiorari. Ninth Circuit reversed, vacated, and remanded.

== See also ==
- List of United States Supreme Court cases, volume 568
- List of United States Supreme Court cases, volume 569
- List of United States Supreme Court cases, volume 570
