= Oxford Health Plans LLC v. Sutter =

- Supreme Court of the United States

Decided June 10, 2013
- Full case name: Oxford Health Plans LLC v. Sutter
- Citations: 569 U.S. 564 (more)

Holding
- Under the limited judicial review allowed for decisions from binding arbitation, the sole question is whether the arbitrator arguably interpreted the parties' contract, not whether the arbitrator erred.

Court membership
- Chief Justice John Roberts Associate Justices Antonin Scalia · Anthony Kennedy; Clarence Thomas · Ruth Bader Ginsburg; Stephen Breyer · Samuel Alito; Sonia Sotomayor · Elena Kagan

Case opinions
- Majority: Kagan, joined by unanimous
- Concurrence: Alito, joined by Thomas

Laws applied
- Federal Arbitration Act

Oxford Health Plans LLC v. Sutter, 569 U.S. 564 (2013), was a United States Supreme Court case in which the court held that, under the limited judicial review allowed for decisions from binding arbitration, the sole question is whether the arbitrator arguably interpreted the parties' contract, not whether the arbitrator erred.

== Background ==
John Ivan Sutter, a pediatrician, provided medical services to Oxford Health Plans's insurance customers under a fee-for-services contract that required binding arbitration of contractual disputes. He nonetheless filed a proposed class action in New Jersey Superior Court, alleging that Oxford failed to fully and promptly pay him and other physicians with similar Oxford contracts. On Oxford’s motion, the court compelled arbitration. The parties agreed that the arbitrator should decide whether their contract authorized class arbitration, and he concluded that it did. Oxford filed a motion in federal court to vacate the arbitrator’s decision, claiming that he had "exceeded [his] powers" under §10(a)(4) of the Federal Arbitration Act (FAA). The federal district court denied the motion, and the Third Circuit Court of Appeals affirmed.

== Opinion of the court ==
The Supreme Court issued an opinion on June 10, 2013.
