= Preston v. Ferrer =

- Supreme Court of the United States

Argued January 14, 2008 Decided February 20, 2008
- Full case name: Arnold M. Preston, Petitioner v. Alex E. Ferrer
- Docket no.: 06-1463
- Citations: 552 U.S. 346 (more) 128 S. Ct. 978; 169 L. Ed. 2d 917

Case history
- Prior: Ferrer v. Preston, 145 Cal.App.4th 440, 51 Cal.Rptr.3d 628 (App. 2d Dist. 2006)

Holding
- When all parties to a contract agree to arbitrate their disputes, this also covers disputes which state law requires be referred to an administrative agency.

Court membership
- Chief Justice John Roberts Associate Justices John P. Stevens · Antonin Scalia; Anthony Kennedy · David Souter; Clarence Thomas · Ruth Bader Ginsburg; Stephen Breyer · Samuel Alito

Case opinions
- Majority: Ginsburg, joined by Roberts, Stevens, Scalia, Kennedy, Souter, Breyer, Alito
- Dissent: Thomas

Laws applied
- Federal Arbitration Act

Preston v. Ferrer, 552 U.S. 346 (2008), was a United States Supreme Court case in which the Court held, 8–1, that the Federal Arbitration Act (FAA) overrules state laws declaring that certain disputes must be resolved by a state administrative agency.

== Background ==
Alex Ferrer, who plays Judge Alex in a syndicated American courtroom television show, was notified of a demand for arbitration by Arnold Preston, a California attorney. Preston claimed Ferrer owed him fees under a "personal management" contract; in the contract, they had agreed to arbitrate disputes rather than bring them to court. Ferrer then petitioned the California Labor Commissioner, claiming the contract was invalid and unenforceable under California law, as Preston had allegedly acted as a talent agent without a license. Preston argued that he was not acting as a talent agent, and that an arbitrator, not a court, should decide whether this was the case.

== Supreme Court ==
Oral arguments were heard on January 14, 2008. Joseph D. Schleimer argued on behalf of the petitioner, Arnold Preston, and Eric Brunstad, Jr. argued on behalf of the respondent, Alex Ferrer.

=== Opinion of the Court ===
Citing Southland Corp. v. Keating, the Court noted that it had ruled consistently that the FAA was "a national policy favoring arbitration" when parties contract to settle disputes in that manner, and that it "foreclose[s] state legislative attempts to undercut the enforceability of arbitration agreements." Citing two other previous Supreme Court rulings, the Court also noted that challenges to the validity of an entire contract are subject to the arbitration agreed to in the contract. Ferrer's argument was "unconvincing", the Court ruled, that state law required the exhaustion of administrative remedies before arbitration would commence.

=== Dissenting opinion ===
In a 4-sentence dissent, Justice Clarence Thomas wrote, "As I have stated on many previous occasions, I believe that the Federal Arbitration Act ... does not apply to proceedings in state courts."

== See also ==
- List of United States Supreme Court cases, volume 552
