= Badgerow v. Walters =

- Supreme Court of the United States

Argued November 2, 2021 Decided March 31, 2022
- Full case name: Denise A. Badgerow v. Greg Walters, et al.
- Docket no.: 20-1143
- Citations: 596 U.S. 1 (more)
- Argument: Oral argument

Holding
- The “look-through” approach to determining federal jurisdiction, whereby a federal court assesses whether there is a jurisdictional basis to decide a Federal Arbitration Act Section 4 petition to compel arbitration by means of examining the parties’ underlying dispute, does not apply to requests to confirm or vacate arbitral awards under Sections 9 and 10 of the Federal Arbitration Act.

Court membership
- Chief Justice John Roberts Associate Justices Clarence Thomas · Stephen Breyer; Samuel Alito · Sonia Sotomayor; Elena Kagan · Neil Gorsuch; Brett Kavanaugh · Amy Coney Barrett

Case opinions
- Majority: Kagan, joined by Roberts, Thomas, Alito, Sotomayor, Gorsuch, Kavanaugh, Barrett
- Dissent: Breyer

Laws applied
- Federal Arbitration Act

Badgerow v. Walters, 596 U.S. 1 (2022), was a United States Supreme Court case concerning when, if ever, federal courts have subject matter jurisdiction to confirm or vacate arbitration awards under the Federal Arbitration Act (FAA). The Court held that the "look through" approach established by the Court's decision in Vaden v. Discover Bank "does not apply to requests to confirm or vacate arbitral awards under Sections 9 and 10 of the FAA."

== Background ==
Denise Badgerow was an employee of REJ Properties, Inc., a Louisiana financial services provider. As part of her employment, Badgerow signed an agreement to arbitrate any disputes between her and her employer. In 2016, Badgerow was fired from her position. Following her termination, Badgerow sued the principals of REJ Properties, alleging that she had been discriminated against due to her gender and that she had been fired in retaliation for reporting this discrimination as well as other violations of U.S. securities law. Badgerow filed suit before the Equal Employment Opportunity Commission and in the United States District Court for the Eastern District of Louisiana. Additionally, Badgerow initiated arbitration proceedings against the principal employees of REJ Properties.

Badgerow subsequently lost the arbitration and her cases in district court and the EEOC were both dismissed. Following her loss in the arbitration, Badgerow filed a new case in Louisiana state court, asking the state court to vacate the arbitration award entered against her. The principals of REJ Properties subsequently removed that case to federal court, arguing that the federal court held jurisdiction to decide the case under Sections 9 and 11 of the Federal Arbitration Act.

Both the district court and the United States Court of Appeals for the Fifth Circuit agreed that they held jurisdiction to review the claim and that removal was proper. Likewise, both courts held that Badgerow had not shown that the arbitration award should be vacated. Badgerow subsequently appealed these decisions to the Supreme Court, which granted certiorari on May 17, 2021. Oral argument took place on November 2, 2021.

Following oral argument, Holly Barker at BloombergLaw surmised the lower court rulings in favor of jurisdiction were likely to be affirmed. By contrast, Ronald Mann writing for SCOTUSBlog suggested that "it is far from obvious" how the justices will rule in this case.
