= American Express Co. v. Italian Colors Restaurant =

- Supreme Court of the United States

Argued February 27, 2013 Decided June 20, 2013
- Full case name: American Express Co., et al. v. Italian Colors Restaurant
- Docket no.: 12-133
- Citations: 570 U.S. 228 (more) 133 S. Ct. 2304; 186 L. Ed. 2d 417

Case history
- Prior: In re Am. Express Merchs. Litig., 554 F.3d 300 (2d Cir. 2009); vacated and remanded, 559 U.S. 1103 (2010); on remand, 634 F.3d 187 (2d Cir. 2011), adhered to on rehearing en banc, 667 F.3d 204 (2d Cir. 2012); cert. granted, 568 U.S. 1006 (2012).

Holding
- The prohibitively high cost of arbitration is not a sufficient reason for a court to overrule an arbitration clause that forbids class action suits.

Court membership
- Chief Justice John Roberts Associate Justices Antonin Scalia · Anthony Kennedy; Clarence Thomas · Ruth Bader Ginsburg; Stephen Breyer · Samuel Alito; Sonia Sotomayor · Elena Kagan

Case opinions
- Majority: Scalia, joined by Roberts, Kennedy, Thomas, Alito
- Concurrence: Thomas
- Dissent: Kagan, joined by Breyer, Ginsburg
- Sotomayor took no part in the consideration or decision of the case.

Laws applied
- Federal Arbitration Act

American Express Co. v. Italian Colors Restaurant, 570 U.S. 228 (2013), ("Italian Colors") is a United States Supreme Court case decided in 2013.

== Background ==
An agreement between petitioners, American Express and a subsidiary, and respondents, merchants who accept American Express cards, require[d] all of their disputes to be resolved by arbitration and provide[d] that there "shall be no right or authority for any Claims to be arbitrated on a class action basis." Respondents nonetheless filed a class action, claiming that petitioners violated section 1 of the Sherman Act and seeking treble damages for the class under §4 of the Clayton Act. Petitioners moved to compel individual arbitration under the Federal Arbitration Act (FAA), but respondents countered that the cost of expert analysis necessary to prove the antitrust claims would greatly exceed the maximum recovery for an individual plaintiff. The District Court granted the motion and dismissed the lawsuits. The Second Circuit reversed and remanded, holding that because of the prohibitive costs respondents would face if they had to arbitrate, the class-action waiver was unenforceable and arbitration could not proceed. The Circuit stood by its reversal when this Court remanded in light of Stolt-Nielsen S. A. v. AnimalFeeds International Corp., which held that a party may not be compelled to submit to class arbitration absent an agreement to do so.

== Issue ==
Is American Express Company's arbitration clause prohibiting class action suits enforceable, even though it would compel arbitration of antitrust claims?

== Holding ==
The prohibitively high cost of arbitration is not a sufficient reason for a court to overrule an arbitration clause that forbids class action suits. Federal law does not guarantee that a claim will be resolved affordably. The fact that it can be more expensive to litigate individual arbitrations than they are worth does not negate the right to pursue a statutory remedy. Therefore, no exception to the Federal Arbitration Act (FAA) can be applied.

== Dissent ==
Justice Kagan, with whom Justice Ginsburg and Justice Breyer joined, wrote in her dissent that: The purpose of the FAA is to resolve disputes and facilitate compensation of injuries. By barring any means of sharing or shrinking arbitration costs, the arbitration clause in the American Express form contract functions to confer immunity from potentially meritorious federal claims, which runs counter to the purpose of the FAA ("No rational actor would bring a claim worth tens of thousands of dollars if doing so meant incurring costs in the hundreds of thousands"). The contract also violates the Sherman Act by depriving parties of a chance to challenge allegedly monopolistic conduct.

== Significance ==
This case, combined with AT&T Mobility LLC v. Concepcion, has led to a fear that businesses will adopt arbitration en masse, which will effectively prohibit effective antitrust enforcement. A 2013 analysis in Harvard Law Review stated that: "The Court’s [Italian Colors] decision makes it likely that many federal statutes will no longer be enforced privately in certain contexts, further weakening a judicially created principle that was already difficult to apply. Thus, it is now up to Congress to determine whether, and in what contexts, it favors contractual freedom in arbitration agreements over private enforcement of federal statutes."
