= Arthur Andersen LLP v. Carlisle =

- Supreme Court of the United States

Decided May 4, 2009
- Full case name: Arthur Andersen LLP v. Carlisle
- Citations: 556 U.S. 624 (more)

Holding
- The FAA does not alter state contract law regarding the scope of agreements, including arbitration agreements.

Court membership
- Chief Justice John Roberts Associate Justices John P. Stevens · Antonin Scalia; Anthony Kennedy · David Souter; Clarence Thomas · Ruth Bader Ginsburg; Stephen Breyer · Samuel Alito

Case opinions
- Majority: Scalia, joined by Kennedy, Thomas, Ginsburg, Breyer, Alito
- Dissent: Souter, joined by Roberts, Stevens

Laws applied
- Federal Arbitration Act

Arthur Andersen LLP v. Carlisle, 556 U.S. 624 (2009), was a United States Supreme Court case in which the court held that the Federal Arbitration Act does not alter state contract law regarding the scope of agreements, including arbitration agreements.

== Background ==
After consulting with Arthur Andersen, a group of people including Wayne Carlisle, James Bushman, and Gary Strassel used a shelter to minimize taxes from the sale of their company. Limited liability corporations created by Carlisle, Bushman, and Strassel entered into investment-management agreements with Bricolage Capital, LLC, that provided for arbitration of disputes. After the Internal Revenue Service found the tax shelter illegal, respondents filed a diversity suit against Arthur Andersen. Claiming that equitable estoppel required Carlisle and the others to arbitrate their claims per the agreements with Bricolage, Arthur Andersen invoked Section 3 of the Federal Arbitration Act (FAA), which entitles litigants to stay an action that is "referable to arbitration under an agreement in writing." Section 16(a)(1)(A) of the FAA allows an appeal from "an order... refusing a stay of any action under section 3." The federal District Court denied the stay motions, and the Sixth Circuit Court of Appeals dismissed an interlocutory appeal by Arthur Andersen for want of jurisdiction.

== Opinion of the court ==
The Supreme Court issued an opinion on May 4, 2009.
