= Hall Street Associates, L.L.C. v. Mattel, Inc. =

- Supreme Court of the United States

Argued November 7, 2007 Decided March 25, 2008
- Full case name: Hall Street Associates, L.L.C., Petitioner v. Mattel, Inc.
- Docket no.: 06-989
- Citations: 552 U.S. 576 (more) 128 S. Ct. 1396; 170 L. Ed. 2d 254; 2008 U.S. LEXIS 2911; 76 U.S.L.W. 4168; 2008 AMC 1058; 21 Fla. L. Weekly Fed. S 121

Case history
- Prior: Arbitration award vacated, 145 F. Supp. 2d 1211 (D. Or. 2001), affirmed in part, reversed in part, and remanded, 113 F. App'x 272 (9th Cir. 2004); arbitration award vacated again, No. 3:00-cv-00355, 2005 WL 8158950 (D. Or. June 30, 2005); reversed, 196 F. App'x 476 (9th Cir. 2006); cert. granted, 550 U.S. 968 (2007).
- Subsequent: Remanded, 531 F.3d 1019 (9th Cir. 2008).

Holding
- State and federal courts cannot, on a motion to vacate or modify an arbitration award, apply standards agreed to by the parties that expand the scope of judicial review under the Federal Arbitration Act.

Court membership
- Chief Justice John Roberts Associate Justices John P. Stevens · Antonin Scalia; Anthony Kennedy · David Souter; Clarence Thomas · Ruth Bader Ginsburg; Stephen Breyer · Samuel Alito

Case opinions
- Majority: Souter, joined by Roberts, Thomas, Ginsburg, Alito; Scalia (all but footnote 7)
- Dissent: Stevens, joined by Kennedy
- Dissent: Breyer

Laws applied
- Federal Arbitration Act

Hall Street Associates, L.L.C. v. Mattel, Inc., 552 U.S. 576 (2008), was a United States Supreme Court case that held that state and federal courts cannot, on a motion to vacate or to modify an arbitration award, expand the limited scope of judicial review specified in 9 U.S.C. §§ 10 and 11, including terms that were agreed upon by the parties.

== Background ==
Toy manufacturer Mattel was sued by its landlord Hall Street Associates in a dispute over a property lease, the property being a former View-Master factory in Beaverton, Oregon where significant pollution was found. After the litigation went to federal court, both parties agreed to resolve the case by arbitration according to the procedures outlined in the Federal Arbitration Act (FAA). Atypically, the parties' arbitration agreement stipulated that the District Court could override the arbitrator's decision if "the arbitrator's conclusions of law are erroneous." That provision of the agreement granted the federal courts a much broader role in supervising the arbitration than is specifically granted in the Act, which explicitly mentions only a narrow set of circumstances under which courts can override an arbitration award, such as corruption, partiality, or misbehavior on the part of the arbitrator.

The arbitrator heard the parties' arguments and handed down a decision in favor of Mattel. Hall sought review from the District Court, which found that the arbitrator's decision contained legally erroneous conclusions. Accordingly, the arbitrator ruled for Hall Street, and the District Court affirmed.

On appeal, the U.S. Court of Appeals for the Ninth Circuit ruled that the original arbitration award, favoring Mattel, must stand. Even if the arbitrator had made legal errors, the courts had no place to review the soundness of the arbitrator's decision. The Ninth Circuit viewed the FAA's list of circumstances meriting judicial review as an exclusive list. As far as the original arbitration agreement expanded the scope of judicial review of the arbitration, the agreement could not be enforced.

== Decision ==
In a 6–3 decision, the Supreme Court rejected the argument that parties to a contract could expand the limited scope of judicial review, and it even stated that the courts cannot expand it, even for extraordinary circumstances:

Even assuming §§10 and 11 could be supplemented to some extent.... But §9 makes evident that expanding §10's and §11's detailed categories at all would rub too much against the grain.

== Aftermath ==
Because the Supreme Court rejected any expansion to the limited scope of judicial review stated in 9 U.S.C. §§ 10 and 11, other courts, such as the United States Court of Appeals for the Eighth Circuit, have also rejected other judicially created exceptions, such as "manifest disregard for the law." Previously, the Eighth Circuit had recognized "manifest disregard" as a grounds to vacate an arbitration award, defining manifest disregard as when "the arbitrators were fully aware of the existence of a clearly defined governing legal principle, but refused to apply it, in effect, ignoring it." However, after the Supreme Court passed its ruling in Hall Street, the Eighth Circuit held that even manifest disregard is not a sufficient grounds to vacate an arbitration award.

== See also ==
- List of United States Supreme Court cases, volume 552
