= Rent-A-Center, West, Inc. v. Jackson =

- Supreme Court of the United States

Decided June 21, 2010
- Full case name: Rent-A-Center, West, Inc. v. Jackson
- Citations: 561 U.S. 63 (more)

Holding
- Under the Federal Arbitration Act, where an agreement to arbitrate includes an agreement that the arbitrator will determine whether the agreement is enforceable, if a party challenges specifically the enforceability of that particular agreement, the district court considers the challenge. However, if a party challenges the enforceability of the agreement as a whole, the challenge is for the arbitrator.

Court membership
- Chief Justice John Roberts Associate Justices John P. Stevens · Antonin Scalia; Anthony Kennedy · Clarence Thomas; Ruth Bader Ginsburg · Stephen Breyer; Samuel Alito · Sonia Sotomayor

Case opinions
- Majority: Scalia, joined by Roberts, Kennedy, Thomas, Alito
- Dissent: Stevens, joined by Ginsburg, Breyer, Sotomayor

Laws applied
- Federal Arbitration Act

Rent-A-Center, West, Inc. v. Jackson, 561 U.S. 63 (2010), was a United States Supreme Court case in which the Court held that under the Federal Arbitration Act, where an agreement to arbitrate includes an agreement that the arbitrator will determine whether the agreement is enforceable, if a party challenges specifically the enforceability of that particular agreement, the district court considers the challenge. However, if a party challenges the enforceability of the agreement as a whole, the challenge is for the arbitrator.
