= New Prime Inc. v. Oliveira =

- Supreme Court of the United States

Argued October 3, 2018 Decided January 15, 2019
- Full case name: New Prime Inc. v. Dominic Oliveira
- Docket no.: 17-340
- Citations: 586 U.S. ___ (more) 139 S. Ct. 532; 202 L. Ed. 2d 536
- Argument: Oral argument

Case history
- Prior: Oliveira v. New Prime, Inc., 141 F. Supp. 3d 125 (D. Mass. 2015); affirmed in part, dismissed in part, 857 F.3d 7 (1st Cir. 2017); cert. granted, 138 S. Ct. 1164 (2018).

Holding
- The exceptions in the FAA apply to contractors as they would to employees.

Court membership
- Chief Justice John Roberts Associate Justices Clarence Thomas · Ruth Bader Ginsburg; Stephen Breyer · Samuel Alito; Sonia Sotomayor · Elena Kagan; Neil Gorsuch · Brett Kavanaugh

Case opinions
- Majority: Gorsuch, joined by Roberts, Thomas, Ginsburg, Breyer, Alito, Sotomayor, Kagan
- Concurrence: Ginsburg
- Kavanaugh took no part in the consideration or decision of the case.

Laws applied
- Federal Arbitration Act

New Prime Inc. v. Oliveira, 586 U.S. ___ (2019), was a United States Supreme Court case dealing with the classification of employees hired as contractors in relation to exceptions to arbitration set forth in the Federal Arbitration Act (FAA). The Court ruled unanimously that the exceptions set forth in the FAA, principally for those involved in foreign and interstate commerce such as truck drivers, do apply to contractors as they would to regular employees.

== Background ==
The Federal Arbitration Act (FAA) of 1925 (Pub. L. 68–401, 43 Stat. 883, enacted February 12, 1925) allows employers in the United States to include binding arbitration language in their employment contracts that require employees to agree to use designated arbitration methods to resolve disputes with the company rather than seeking action in the court system. Section 1 of the FAA sets out exemptions for employees involved in foreign or interstate commerce activities, leading that "nothing herein contained [within the Statute] shall apply to contracts of employment of seamen, railroad employees, or any other class of workers engaged in foreign or interstate commerce."

In the present case, Dominic Oliveira sought employment with New Prime Inc., an American trucking company. When he was hired, he first had to drive 10,000 miles as an unpaid "trainee", followed by 30,000 miles as an "apprentice" working at US$4 an hour. Oliveira was then brought into the company proper, he was given the option to be hired as an employee, or as an independent contractor, which the company asserted would be more economical for Oliveira. Oliveira opted to be hired as a contractor. However, because he was an independent contractor, this allowed New Prime to charge Oliveira and other drivers through leasing of the New Prime vehicles and to pay for their own fuel and equipment through deductions from their paychecks, items that the company would normally pay for if the person was an employee. Oliveira frequently found these costs exceeded his base rate, effectively paying New Prime for his employment. While the terms of his independent contract allow him to drive for other companies, Oliveira found that his schedule was heavily dictated by New Prime. Oliveira eventually dropped the independent contractor and was rehired as an employee of New Prime, where his work duties and commitment were essentially identical to what he had done as an independent contractor, but taking home much more from his paycheck.

In 2015, Oliveira started a class-action lawsuit against New Prime, representing all other contracted drivers they had hired, arguing the company was not paying fair wages to its independent contractors. New Prime attempted to stop the lawsuit by referring to their company's arbitration agreement; while the FAA as written allows for exceptions for employees involved in commerce, New Prime argued that Oliveira was a contractor, and thus not covered by the "contracts of employment" exception, and thus his complaints must be heard by arbitration. This led to the case first hearing in District Court, where the court could not answer the question of whether Oliveira's time as an independent contractor fell within the Section 1 exception of the FAA, and thus ordered a discovery phase to evaluate the nature of his employment. The District Court thus refused to issue a summary judgment in the lawsuit as requested by New Prime. New Prime appealed this decision to the United States Court of Appeals for the First Circuit, believing that the question of Section 1 of the FAA applicability should be decided by the arbitrator and not the court system. The First Circuit held in favor of Oliveira in two parts, first by asserting that it was the court's responsibility to determine if Section 1's exceptions applied in this case, and second that Oliveira, even as an independent contractor, fell within these exceptions, which would allow the class-action suit to proceed.

== Supreme Court ==
New Prime petitioned for a writ of certiorari to the Supreme Court in September 2017 to challenge both facets of the First Circuit's decision. The Court accepted the case for its 2018 term, and oral hearing was held on October 3, 2018; this date was prior to Brett Kavanaugh's appointment to the court, so he took no part in any of the case's proceedings. It was the first of three cases the Court agreed to hear during the term related to arbitration. Some observers to the Court feared that the case would weigh in favor of New Prime, as the Court's recent decisions related to arbitration had favored employers, and with Kavanaugh, a conservative, set to join, further cases related to arbitration would continue to weigh in favor of employers.

The Court issued its decision on January 15, 2019. In a unanimous decision, the Court upheld the findings of the First Circuit, affirming that judgment of whether Section 1 exceptions applied or not was a role for the courts and not arbitration, and that within Oliveira's case, the written intent of the FAA covered any type of employer-employee agreement, including the independent contractor construct, and thus Oliveira was not bound by the FAA to seek arbitration. Justice Neil Gorsuch, writing the majority opinion, explained that the way that the FAA was written used the term "contracts of employment"; reviewing dictionaries and other works published around 1925, it was clear that Congress' intent was not specifically tailored to the specific term "employees" but instead to a broader classification of "workers", which would readily cover independent contractors. Justice Ruth Bader Ginsburg wrote a concurring opinion, mirroring Gorsuch and noting the importance of language evolution in law.

The decision briefly hit the stocks of several transportation companies, as the use of the independent contracting mechanic for employment has been a common practice in the industry; the Court's ruling would mean these companies would need to be able to prepare to treat these contractors as employees, which will impact their operating costs. This would then have a ripple effect on the US economy since the price of shipping goods would likely increase to cover these costs.
