= C & L Enterprises, Inc. v. Citizen Band, Potawatomi Indian Tribe of Oklahoma =

C & L Enterprises v. Citizen Band, Potawatomi Indian Tribe of Okla.
- Supreme Court of the United States

Argued March 19, 2001 Decided April 30, 2001
- Full case name: C & L Enterprises, Inc. v. Citizen Band, Potawatomi Indian Tribe of Oklahoma
- Citations: 532 U.S. 411 (more) 121 S. Ct. 1589; 149 L. Ed. 2d 623

Case history
- Prior: Upheld tribal immunity, Okla. Civ. App., Div. 2, Feb. 8, 2000 (not reported)

Holding
- An Indian Tribe waives its sovereign immunity when it enters into a contract that provides for arbitration and being heard in a state court.

Court membership
- Chief Justice William Rehnquist Associate Justices John P. Stevens · Sandra Day O'Connor; Antonin Scalia · Anthony Kennedy; David Souter · Clarence Thomas; Ruth Bader Ginsburg · Stephen Breyer

Case opinion
- Majority: Ginsburg, joined by unanimous

C & L Enterprises, Inc. v. Citizen Band, Potawatomi Indian Tribe of Oklahoma, 532 U.S. 411 (2001), was a United States Supreme Court case in which the Court held that the tribe waived its sovereign immunity when it agreed to a contract containing an arbitration agreement.

== Background ==
In 1993, the Citizen Band Potawatomi Indian Tribe of Oklahoma entered into a contract with C & L Enterprises, Inc. to install a roof on a tribally owned building that was not on reservation land. Prior to the work being performed under the contract, the Potawatomi decided to use a different type of roof, re-bid the job and selected another contractor to install the roof.

The contract used with C & L Enterprises was provided by the tribe and contained both an arbitration clause and a choice of law clause. C & L then sought to enforce the arbitration clause and the tribe claimed sovereign immunity. The arbitrator ruled in favor of C & L and C & L filed suit to enforce the judgment in the District Court of Oklahoma County.

The trial court denied the tribes motion to dismiss based upon sovereign immunity and the tribe appealed. The Oklahoma Court of Civil Appeals affirmed and the Oklahoma Supreme Court declined to review the case. It was next appealed to the U.S. Supreme Court.

During the time the case was pending, the U.S. Supreme Court decided Kiowa Tribe of Okla. v. Manufacturing Technologies, Inc. In view of that decision, the decision of the Oklahoma Court of Civil Appeals was vacated and the case remanded. On remand, the Court of Civil Appeals held that the Potawatomi did have sovereign immunity and C & L appealed.

Several other courts had held that an arbitration clause waived immunity, and the Supreme Court granted certiorari to resolve the conflict.

== Opinion of the Court ==
Justice Ruth Bader Ginsburg delivered the opinion of the court, reversing and remanding.

An Indian tribe has sovereignty and is immune from suit in a state court unless that immunity has been specifically abrogated by the United States Congress or clearly waived by the tribe. In this case, the Potawatomie Tribe entered into a contract, using a contract form that the tribe provided, that agreed to arbitration and to having the dispute heard in state court. This is a clear waiver of the tribe's sovereign immunity.
