= List of United States Supreme Court cases, volume 561 =

This is a list of all the United States Supreme Court cases from volume 561 of the United States Reports:

Case name	Citation	Date decided
Holder v. Humanitarian Law Project	561 U.S. 1	June 21, 2010
The federal government may prohibit providing non-violent material support for terrorist organizations, including legal services and advice, without violating the free speech clause of the First Amendment.
Rent-A-Center, West, Inc. v. Jackson	561 U.S. 63	June 21, 2010
Under the Federal Arbitration Act, where an agreement to arbitrate includes an agreement that the arbitrator will determine whether the agreement is enforceable, if a party challenges specifically the enforceability of that particular agreement, the district court considers the challenge. However, if a party challenges the enforceability of the agreement as a whole, the challenge is for the arbitrator.
Kawasaki Kisen Kaisha Ltd. v. Regal-Beloit Corp.	561 U.S. 89	June 21, 2010
When a cargo shipment begins overseas, portions of the trip when the goods are traveling over land by train are governed by the Carriage of Goods by Sea Act, not the Carmack Amendment to the Interstate Commerce Act.
Monsanto Co. v. Geertson Seed Farms	561 U.S. 139	June 21, 2010
The plaintiffs in this case had standing, and the district court abused its discretion by entering a nationwide injunction.
Doe v. Reed	561 U.S. 186	June 24, 2010
Disclosure of referendum petitions does not as a general matter violate the Petition Clause of the First Amendment.
Morrison v. National Australia Bank	561 U.S. 247	June 24, 2010
Section 10(b) of the Securities Exchange Act of 1934 does not provide a cause of action to foreign plaintiffs suing foreign and American defendants for misconduct in connection with securities traded on foreign exchanges.
Granite Rock Co. v. Teamsters	561 U.S. 287	June 24, 2010
Courts, not arbitrators, determine whether and when arbitration contracts are formed when the decision affects whether parties intended to submit an issue to arbitration.
Magwood v. Patterson	561 U.S. 320	June 24, 2010
When a state prisoner obtains federal habeas corpus relief and is re-sentenced, a habeas application challenging the new judgment is not a "second or successive" challenge even if the prisoner could have challenged the original sentence on the same ground.
Skilling v. United States	561 U.S. 358	June 24, 2010
Pretrial publicity and community prejudice did not prevent Skilling from obtaining a fair trial. However, the honest services fraud statute, 18 U.S.C. §1346, is properly confined to cover only bribery and kickback schemes, which do not include Skilling's alleged misconduct. So construed, §1346 is not unconstitutionally vague.
Black v. United States	561 U.S. 465	June 24, 2010
Remanded for reconsideration in light of Skilling v. United States. By properly objecting to the honest-services jury instructions at trial, the defendants secured their right to challenge those instructions on appeal.
Weyhrauch v. United States	561 U.S. 476	June 24, 2010
Judgment vacated and remanded for further consideration in light of Skilling v. United States.
Free Enterprise Fund v. Public Company Accounting Oversight Board	561 U.S. 477	June 28, 2010
The dual for-cause limitations on the removal of members of the Public Company Accounting Oversight Board contravene the Constitution's separation of powers, but the unconstitutional limitations are severable from the remainder of the statute. The Board's appointment is consistent with the Appointments clause.
Bilski v. Kappos	561 U.S. 593	June 28, 2010
The machine-or-transformation test is not the sole test for determining the patent eligibility of a process, but rather a useful tool. Bilski's application, seeking a patent on a method for hedging risk in the commodities market, did not draw to patent eligible subject matter.
Christian Legal Society v. Martinez	561 U.S. 661	June 28, 2010
The policy of Hastings, which requires student groups to accept all students regardless of their status or beliefs in order to obtain official recognition, is a reasonable, viewpoint-neutral condition on access to the forum; it therefore does not transgress First Amendment limitations.
McDonald v. City of Chicago	561 U.S. 742	June 28, 2010
The right to keep and bear arms for self defense in one's home is protected under the Second Amendment, and is incorporated against the states through the Due Process Clause of the Fourteenth Amendment.
Sears v. Upton	561 U.S. 945	June 29, 2010
Proper application of the prejudice test of Strickland v. Washington "requires precisely the type of probing and fact-specific analysis that the state trial court failed to undertake." Courts must undertake a point-by-point investigation of the deficiencies in the defense and reweigh the likely outcome. Courts may not perform a cursory analysis and claim that there is no way to know how the inadequate defense might have affected the outcome of the trial.
