= Gilmer v. Interstate/Johnson Lane Corp. =

- Supreme Court of the United States

Argued January 14, 1991 Decided May 13, 1991
- Full case name: Gilmer v. Interstate/Johnson Lane Corp.
- Docket no.: 90-18
- Citations: 500 U.S. 20 (more) 111 S. Ct. 1647; 114 L. Ed. 2d 26; 1991 U.S. LEXIS 2529

Case history
- Prior: 895 F.2d 195

Holding
- Petitioner's statutory claims under the Age Discrimination in Employment Act are subject to arbitration under the Federal Arbitration Act pursuant to the parties' agreement.

Court membership
- Chief Justice William Rehnquist Associate Justices Byron White · Thurgood Marshall; Harry Blackmun · John P. Stevens; Sandra Day O'Connor · Antonin Scalia; Anthony Kennedy · David Souter

Case opinions
- Majority: White, joined by Rehnquist, Blackmun, O'Connor, Scalia, Kennedy, Souter
- Dissent: Stevens, joined by Marshall

Laws applied
- Federal Arbitration Act

Gilmer v. Interstate/Johnson Lane Corp., 500 U.S. 20 (1991), is a 1991 case in which the Supreme Court of the United States ruled that the Federal Arbitration Act requires enforcement of an arbitration clause to compel arbitration of statutory Age Discrimination in Employment Act of 1967 claims. A regional brokerage house, Interstate Johnson Lane later became part of Wachovia Securities.
