= Coinbase, Inc. v. Suski =

- Supreme Court of the United States

Argued February 28, 2024 Decided May 23, 2024
- Full case name: Coinbase, Inc. v. Suski
- Docket no.: 23-3
- Citations: 602 U.S. 143 (more)
- Argument: Oral argument
- Opinion announcement: Opinion announcement

Holding
- Where one contract between parties sends disputes to arbitration and another contract sends disputes to courts, a court must decide which contract governs.

Court membership
- Chief Justice John Roberts Associate Justices Clarence Thomas · Samuel Alito; Sonia Sotomayor · Elena Kagan; Neil Gorsuch · Brett Kavanaugh; Amy Coney Barrett · Ketanji Brown Jackson

Case opinions
- Majority: Jackson, joined by unanimous
- Concur/dissent: Gorsuch

Coinbase, Inc. v. Suski, 602 U.S. 143 (2024), was a United States Supreme Court case in which the Court held that where one contract between parties sends disputes to arbitration and another contract sends disputes to courts, a court must decide which contract governs.

== See also ==
- Coinbase, Inc. v. Bielski
