= Coinbase, Inc. v. Bielski =

- Supreme Court of the United States

Decided Jun 23, 2023
- Full case name: Coinbase, Inc. v. Bielski
- Citations: 599 U.S. 736 (more)

Holding
- A federal district court must stay its proceedings while an interlocutory appeal on the question of arbitrability is ongoing.

Court membership
- Chief Justice John Roberts Associate Justices Clarence Thomas · Samuel Alito; Sonia Sotomayor · Elena Kagan; Neil Gorsuch · Brett Kavanaugh; Amy Coney Barrett · Ketanji Brown Jackson

Case opinions
- Majority: Kavanaugh, joined by Roberts, Alito, Gorsuch, Barrett
- Dissent: Jackson, joined by Sotomayor, Kagan, Thomas (in part)

Coinbase, Inc. v. Bielski, 599 U.S. 736 (2023), was a United States Supreme Court case in which the Court held that a federal district court must stay its proceedings while an interlocutory appeal on the question of arbitrability is ongoing.

The case was consolidated with another case regarding David Suski, but Suski's case was dismissed as improvidently granted. Suski's case returned to the Supreme Court the next year in Coinbase, Inc. v. Suski.
