= Granite Rock Co. v. International Brotherhood of Teamsters =

- Supreme Court of the United States

Decided June 24, 2010
- Full case name: Granite Rock Co. v. International Brotherhood of Teamsters
- Citations: 561 U.S. 287 (more)

Holding
- Courts, not arbitrators, determine whether and when arbitration contracts are formed when the decision affects whether parties intended to submit an issue to arbitration.

Court membership
- Chief Justice John Roberts Associate Justices John P. Stevens · Antonin Scalia; Anthony Kennedy · Clarence Thomas; Ruth Bader Ginsburg · Stephen Breyer; Samuel Alito · Sonia Sotomayor

Case opinion
- Majority: Thomas, joined by unanimous

Granite Rock Co. v. International Brotherhood of Teamsters, 561 U.S. 287 (2010), was a United States Supreme Court case in which the Court held that courts, not arbitrators, determine whether and when arbitration contracts are formed when the decision affects whether parties intended to submit an issue to arbitration.
