= List of United States Supreme Court cases, volume 514 =

This is a list of all the United States Supreme Court cases from volume 514 of the United States Reports:

Case name	Citation	Date decided
Arizona v. Evans	514 U.S. 1	1995
Swint v. Chambers County Comm'n	514 U.S. 35	1995
Mastrobuono v. Shearson Lehman Hutton, Inc.	514 U.S. 52	1995
Curtiss-Wright Corp. v. Schoonejongen	514 U.S. 73	1995
Shalala v. Guernsey Memorial Hospital	514 U.S. 87	1995
Goeke v. Branch	514 U.S. 115	1995
Director, Office of Workers' Compensation Programs v. Newport News Shipbuilding & Dry Dock Co.	514 U.S. 122	1995
Anderson v. Edwards	514 U.S. 143	1995
Qualitex Co. v. Jacobson Products Co.	514 U.S. 159	1995
Oklahoma Tax Comm'n v. Jefferson Lines, Inc.	514 U.S. 175	1995
Whitaker v. Superior Court of Cal., San Francisco Cty.	514 U.S. 208	1995
Plaut v. Spendthrift Farm, Inc.	514 U.S. 211	1995
Shalala v. Whitecotton	514 U.S. 268	1995
Freightliner Corp. v. Myrick	514 U.S. 280	1995
Heintz v. Jenkins	514 U.S. 291	1995
Celotex Corp. v. Edwards	514 U.S. 300	1995
McIntyre v. Ohio Elections Commission	514 U.S. 334	1995
Stone v. INS	514 U.S. 386	1995
Kyles v. Whitley	514 U.S. 419	1995
Rubin v. Coors Brewing Co.	514 U.S. 476	1995
California Dept. of Corrections v. Morales	514 U.S. 499	1995
United States v. Williams	514 U.S. 527	1995
United States v. Lopez	514 U.S. 549	1995
New York State Conference of Blue Cross & Blue Shield Plans v. Travelers Ins. Co.	514 U.S. 645	1995
United States v. Robertson	514 U.S. 669	1995
Kansas v. Colorado	514 U.S. 673	1995
Hubbard v. United States	514 U.S. 695	1995
City of Edmonds v. Oxford House, Inc.	514 U.S. 725	1995
Reynoldsville Casket Co. v. Hyde	514 U.S. 749	1995
Purkett v. Elem	514 U.S. 765	1995
U.S. Term Limits, Inc. v. Thornton	514 U.S. 779	1995
Wilson v. Arkansas	514 U.S. 927	1995
First Options v. Kaplan	514 U.S. 938	1995
