= GE Energy Power Conversion France SAS v. Outokumpu Stainless USA, LLC =

- Supreme Court of the United States

Decided June 1, 2020
- Full case name: GE Energy Power Conversion France SAS v. Outokumpu Stainless USA, LLC
- Docket no.: 18-1048
- Citations: 590 U.S. ___ (more)

Holding
- The Convention on the Recognition and Enforcement of Foreign Arbitral Awards does not conflict with domestic equitable estoppel doctrines that permit the enforcement of arbitration agreements by nonsignatories to those agreements.

Court membership
- Chief Justice John Roberts Associate Justices Clarence Thomas · Ruth Bader Ginsburg; Stephen Breyer · Samuel Alito; Sonia Sotomayor · Elena Kagan; Neil Gorsuch · Brett Kavanaugh

Case opinion
- Majority: Thomas, joined by unanimous

Laws applied
- Convention on the Recognition and Enforcement of Foreign Arbitral Awards

GE Energy Power Conversion France SAS v. Outokumpu Stainless USA, LLC, 590 U.S. 432 (2020), was a United States Supreme Court case in which the Court held that the Convention on the Recognition and Enforcement of Foreign Arbitral Awards does not conflict with domestic equitable estoppel doctrines that permit the enforcement of arbitration agreements by nonsignatories to those agreements.
