= Smith v. Spizzirri =

- Supreme Court of the United States

Decided May 16, 2024
- Full case name: Smith v. Spizzirri
- Docket no.: 22-1218
- Citations: 601 U.S. 472 (more)

Holding
- When a court finds that a lawsuit involves an arbitrable dispute and a party has requested a stay of the court proceeding pending arbitration, Section 3 of the Federal Arbitration Act compels the court to issue a stay, and the court lacks discretion to dismiss the suit.

Court membership
- Chief Justice John Roberts Associate Justices Clarence Thomas · Samuel Alito; Sonia Sotomayor · Elena Kagan; Neil Gorsuch · Brett Kavanaugh; Amy Coney Barrett · Ketanji Brown Jackson

Case opinion
- Majority: Sotomayor, joined by unanimous

Laws applied
- Federal Arbitration Act

Smith v. Spizzirri, 601 U.S. 472 (2024), was a United States Supreme Court case in which the Court held that, when a court finds that a lawsuit involves an arbitrable dispute and a party has requested a stay of the court proceeding pending arbitration, Section 3 of the Federal Arbitration Act compels the court to issue a stay, and the court lacks discretion to dismiss the suit.
