= Morgan v. Sundance, Inc. =

- Supreme Court of the United States

Decided May 23, 2022
- Full case name: Morgan v. Sundance, Inc.
- Docket no.: 21-328
- Citations: 596 U.S. 411 (more)

Holding
- Federal courts may not adopt an arbitration-specific rule conditioning a waiver of the right to arbitrate on a showing of prejudice.

Court membership
- Chief Justice John Roberts Associate Justices Clarence Thomas · Stephen Breyer; Samuel Alito · Sonia Sotomayor; Elena Kagan · Neil Gorsuch; Brett Kavanaugh · Amy Coney Barrett

Case opinion
- Majority: Kagan, joined by unanimous

Morgan v. Sundance, Inc., 596 U.S. 411 (2022), was a United States Supreme Court case in which the Court held that federal courts may not adopt an arbitration-specific rule conditioning a waiver of the right to arbitrate on a showing of prejudice.
