= DIRECTV, Inc. v. Imburgia =

- Supreme Court of the United States

Argued October 6, 2015 Decided December 14, 2015
- Full case name: DIRECTV, Inc., Petitioner v. Amy Imburgia, et al.
- Docket no.: 14-462
- Citations: 577 U.S. 47 (more) 136 S. Ct. 463; 193 L. Ed. 2d 365
- Opinion announcement: Opinion announcement

Case history
- Prior: On Writ of Certiorari to the Court of Appeal of California, Second Appellate District

Holding
- Because the California Court of Appeal’s interpretation is preempted by the Federal Arbitration Act, that court must enforce the arbitration agreement.

Court membership
- Chief Justice John Roberts Associate Justices Antonin Scalia · Anthony Kennedy; Clarence Thomas · Ruth Bader Ginsburg; Stephen Breyer · Samuel Alito; Sonia Sotomayor · Elena Kagan

Case opinions
- Majority: Breyer, joined by Roberts, Scalia, Kennedy, Alito, Kagan
- Dissent: Thomas
- Dissent: Ginsburg, joined by Sotomayor

Laws applied
- Federal Arbitration Act

DIRECTV, Inc. v. Imburgia, 577 U.S. 47 (2015), was a case in which the United States Supreme Court clarified when arbitration provisions in contracts are governed by the Federal Arbitration Act. In a 6–3 opinion written by Justice Stephen Breyer, the Court reversed a decision by the California Court of Appeal that refused to enforce an arbitration agreement between DIRECTV and its customers. The California Court had ruled that the arbitration agreement was unenforceable because, under applicable California law, a class action arbitration waiver between DIRECTV and its customers was unenforceable. However, the Supreme Court of the United States held that the California Court of Appeal's interpretation was preempted by the Federal Arbitration Act, and the California Court of Appeal was therefore required to enforce the arbitration agreement.

Justice Clarence Thomas filed a dissent, restating his view that the Federal Arbitration Act does not apply to proceedings in state courts. Justice Ruth Bader Ginsburg, joined by Justice Sonia Sotomayor, also filed a dissent, writing that the majority's decision "again expanded the scope of the FAA, further degrading the rights of consumers and further insulating already powerful economic entities from liability for unlawful acts".

== See also ==
- List of United States Supreme Court cases
- Lists of United States Supreme Court cases by volume
- List of United States Supreme Court cases by the Roberts Court
