= First Options of Chicago, Inc. v. Kaplan =

- Supreme Court of the United States

Argued March 22, 1995 Decided May 22, 1995
- Full case name: First Options of Chicago, Incorporated, Petitioner v. Manuel Kaplan, et us. and MK Investments, Incorporated
- Citations: 514 U.S. 938 (more) 115 S. Ct. 1920; 131 L. Ed. 2d 985; 1995 U.S. LEXIS 3463; 63 U.S.L.W. 4459; Fed. Sec. L. Rep. (CCH) ¶ 98,728; Comm. Fut. L. Rep. (CCH) ¶ 26,398; 95 Cal. Daily Op. Service 3821; 95 Daily Journal DAR 6474; 9 Fla. L. Weekly Fed. S 64

Case history
- Prior: On writ of certiorari to the United States Court of Appeals for the Third Circuit

Holding
- Judicial review of arbitrability of contract is properly permitted when parties have not clearly agreed that arbitrator will decide question

Court membership
- Chief Justice William Rehnquist Associate Justices John P. Stevens · Sandra Day O'Connor; Antonin Scalia · Anthony Kennedy; David Souter · Clarence Thomas; Ruth Bader Ginsburg · Stephen Breyer

Case opinion
- Majority: Breyer, joined by unanimous

First Options of Chicago, Inc. v. Kaplan, 514 U.S. 938 (1995), was a case decided by the Supreme Court of the United States on who decides whether a dispute is subject to arbitration, the courts or an arbitrator.

== Background ==
Under the 1924 U.S. Federal Arbitration Act and subsequent Supreme Court rulings, there is a strong presumption in favor of arbitration, with the courts generally deferring to the opinions of an arbitrator.

This case arose out of disputes over a "workout" agreement, embodied in four documents, which governed the "working out" of debts to First Options of Chicago, Inc. incurred as a result of the October 1987 stock market crash (and later losses) by Manuel Kaplan, his wife, and his wholly owned investment company, MK Investments, Inc. (MKI). First Options is a firm that clears stock trades on the Philadelphia Stock Exchange. When First Options' demands for payment went unsatisfied, it sought arbitration by a stock exchange panel. MKI, which had signed the only workout document containing an arbitration agreement, submitted to arbitration, but the Kaplans, who had not signed that document, filed objections with the panel, denying that their disagreement with First Options was arbitrable. The arbitrators decided that they had the power to rule on the dispute's merits and ruled in First Options' favor. The District Court confirmed the award, but the Third Circuit Court of Appeals reversed. The Third Circuit said that courts should independently decide whether an arbitration panel has jurisdiction over a dispute, and that it would apply ordinary standards of review when considering the District Court's denial of the Kaplan's' motion to vacate the arbitration award.

== Supreme Court holdings ==
The Court unanimously agreed with the Third Circuit that arbitrability of the Kaplan—First Options dispute was subject to independent review by the courts. On the narrow question of whether the arbitrators or the courts have the primary power to decide whether the parties agreed to arbitrate a dispute's merits, the Court held that just as the arbitrability of the merits of a dispute depends upon whether the parties agreed to arbitrate that dispute, so the question "who has the primary power to decide arbitrability" turns upon whether the parties agreed to submit that question to arbitration. If so, then the court should defer to the arbitrator's arbitrability decision. If not, then the court should decide the question independently. These answers flow inexorably from the fact that arbitration is simply a matter of contract between the parties. Courts generally should apply ordinary state law principles governing contract formation in deciding whether such an agreement exists. However, courts should not assume that the parties agreed to arbitrate arbitrability unless there is "clear and unmistakable" evidence that they did so.

The Court also held that courts of appeals should apply ordinary standards when reviewing district court decisions upholding arbitration awards, i.e., accepting findings of fact that are not "clearly erroneous" but deciding questions of law de novo; they should not, in those circumstances, apply a special "abuse of discretion" standard.

== See also ==
- List of United States Supreme Court cases, volume 514
- List of United States Supreme Court cases
- Lists of United States Supreme Court cases by volume
- List of United States Supreme Court cases by the Rehnquist Court
