= Circuit City Stores, Inc. v. Adams =

- Supreme Court of the United States

Argued November 6, 2000 Decided March 21, 2001
- Full case name: Circuit City Stores, Incorporated, Petitioner v. Saint Clair Adams
- Citations: 532 U.S. 105 (more) 121 S. Ct. 1302; 149 L. Ed. 2d 234

Case history
- Prior: stay of state proceedings ordered and arbitration compelled, unreported (N.D. Cal., 1998); reversed and remanded, 194 F.3d 1070 (9th Cir. 1999); cert. granted, 529 U.S. 1129 (2000).
- Subsequent: reversed and remanded on different ground, 279 F.3d 889 (9th Cir. 2002)

Holding
- The Federal Arbitration Act's exception of "contracts of employment of seamen, railroad employees, or other classes of workers engaged in interstate commerce" does not apply to general employment contracts.

Court membership
- Chief Justice William Rehnquist Associate Justices John P. Stevens · Sandra Day O'Connor; Antonin Scalia · Anthony Kennedy; David Souter · Clarence Thomas; Ruth Bader Ginsburg · Stephen Breyer

Case opinions
- Majority: Kennedy, joined by Rehnquist, O'Connor, Scalia, Thomas
- Dissent: Stevens, joined by Ginsburg, Breyer; Souter (Parts II and III)
- Dissent: Souter, joined by Stevens, Ginsburg, Breyer

Laws applied
- Federal Arbitration Act

Circuit City Stores, Inc. v. Adams, 532 U.S. 105 (2001), was a United States Supreme Court case that concerned whether the "section one exemption" of the Federal Arbitration Act applied to an employment contract of an employee at Circuit City Stores. The Court held that the exemption was limited to the specific listing of professions contained in the text. This decision meant that general employment contracts, like the one Adams sued under, would have to be arbitrated in accordance with the federal statute.

== Background ==
In 1995, Saint Clair Adams, who was hired as a sales counselor, signed an employment application with Circuit City. A provision in Adams' application required all employment disputes to be settled by arbitration. Specifically, it stated:

I agree that I will settle any and all previously unasserted claims, disputes or controversies arising out of or relating to my application or candidacy for employment, employment and/or cessation of employment with Circuit City, exclusively by final and binding arbitration before a neutral Arbitrator...

In 1997, Adams filed an employment discrimination lawsuit against Circuit City in California state court, alleging violations of state employment law. Circuit City then filed suit in Federal District Court, seeking to enjoin the state-court action and to compel arbitration of Adams' claims under the Federal Arbitration Act. The District Court entered an order to that effect because it decided that Adams was obligated by the arbitration agreement. In reversing, the Ninth Circuit Court of Appeals found that the arbitration agreement between Adams and Circuit City was contained in a "contract of employment," and thus not subject to the Act under section 1 of the Act. Section 1 of the FAA excludes "contracts of employment of seamen, railroad employees, or any other class of workers engaged in foreign or interstate commerce" from the Act's coverage. Circuit City appealed to the Supreme Court which agreed to hear the case.

== Opinion of the Court ==
Justice Anthony Kennedy wrote the majority opinion, reversing the Ninth Circuit and holding that the exception did not apply to this case. The main reason for this finding was the decision that section one's exemption would only be confined to "transportation workers". "The wording of [section one] calls for the application of the maxim ejusdem generis, the statutory canon that 'where general words follow specific words in a statutory enumeration, the general words are construed to embrace only objects similar in nature to those objects enumerated by the preceding specific words...'". Under this method of reading the statute, he would be able to reach an understanding of what the exemption meant. He wrote, "Under this rule of construction the residual clause should be read to give effect to the terms 'seamen' and 'railroad employees,' and should itself be controlled and defined by reference to the enumerated categories of workers which are recited just before it; the interpretation of the clause pressed by respondent fails to produce these results". Therefore, section one "exempts from the FAA only contracts of employment of transportation workers". Kennedy's decision was joined by four other Justices to create a 5-justice majority.

=== Dissenting opinions ===
Justice John Paul Stevens wrote a dissent, with which Justices Ruth Bader Ginsburg and Stephen Breyer joined. Justice David Souter joined all sections of Stevens' dissent besides a critique of previous decision of the Supreme Court in arbitration case law. Stevens examined the history of arbitration and the purpose of it throughout the century. The Federal Arbitration Act was designed, he explained, to maintain the enforceability of contractual agreements. But private arbitration is a whole other situation. Stevens wrote, "As the history of the legislation indicates, the potential disparity in bargaining power between individual employees and large employers was the source of organized labor’s opposition to the Act, which it feared would require courts to enforce unfair employment contracts". He went on to quote the former Chief Justice of the Israeli Supreme Court, Aharon Barak in supporting the idea that the Court should look at the purpose of the act rather than its pure statutory language.

Justice Souter wrote a separate dissent which was joined by the other three Justices who signed onto Stevens' dissent as listed above. He mainly attacked the method of the majority's statutory reading and its failure to look at the statute "as a whole". He wrote, "It is imputing something very odd to the working of the congressional brain to say that Congress took care to bar application of the Act to the class of employment contracts it most obviously had authority to legislate about in 1925..." With that understanding of the Act, he would have affirmed the decision and holding of the Ninth Circuit.

== Subsequent history ==
The case was remanded to the Ninth Circuit, which declared the arbitration agreement unconscionable under California law. That precluded arbitration proceedings and allowed Adams to pursue a regular lawsuit in California courts. Adams was then able to pursue the original claims notwithstanding the decision by Justice Kennedy. In the aftermath of the case, legal analysts said that this case would be important for future arbitration case law.

== See also ==
- Contract of adhesion
