= Title 9 of the United States Code =

U.S. federal statutes on arbitration

Title 9 of the United States Code outlines the role of arbitration in the United States Code.

== Chapters ==
- Chapter 1: General Provisions
- Chapter 2: Convention on the Recognition and Enforcement of Foreign Arbitral Awards
- Chapter 3: Inter-American Convention on International Commercial Arbitration
- Chapter 4: Arbitration of Disputes Involving Sexual Assault and Sexual Harassment

The Inter-American Convention on International Commercial Arbitration was adopted on 30 January 1975 and entered into force for the United States on 27 October 1990.
