= Mitsubishi Motors Corp. v. Soler Chrysler-Plymouth, Inc. =

- Supreme Court of the United States

Argued March 18, 1985 Decided July 2, 1985
- Full case name: Mitsubishi Motors Corp. v. Soler Chrysler-Plymouth, Inc.
- Docket no.: 83-569
- Citations: 473 U.S. 614 (more) 105 S. Ct. 3346; 87 L. Ed. 2d 444
- Argument: Oral argument

Case history
- Prior: Arbitration compelled, 723 F.2d 155, (1st Cir., 1983)
- Subsequent: Order affirmed, 814 F.2d 844 (1st Cir., 1987)

Holding
- Strong national policy favoring arbitration as enacted in Federal Arbitration Act requires that Sherman Act claim be arbitrated before foreign panel per provisions of contract between automobile dealer and manufacturer.

Court membership
- Chief Justice Warren E. Burger Associate Justices William J. Brennan Jr. · Byron White; Thurgood Marshall · Harry Blackmun; Lewis F. Powell Jr. · William Rehnquist; John P. Stevens · Sandra Day O'Connor

Case opinions
- Majority: Blackmun, joined by Burger, White, Rehnquist, O'Connor
- Dissent: Stevens, joined by Brennan; Marshall (except for Part II)
- Powell took no part in the consideration or decision of the case.

Laws applied
- Federal Arbitration Act, Sherman Antitrust Act, Automobile Dealers' Day In Court Act, Convention on the Recognition and Enforcement of Foreign Arbitral Awards
- Superseded by
- Motor Vehicle Franchise Contract Arbitration Fairness Act (2002)

Mitsubishi Motors Corp. v. Soler Chrysler-Plymouth, Inc., 473 U.S. 614 (1985), is a United States Supreme Court decision concerning arbitration of antitrust claims. The Court heard the case on appeal from the United States Court of Appeals for the First Circuit, which had ruled that the arbitration clause in a Puerto Rican car dealer's franchise agreement was broad enough to reach its antitrust claim. By a 5–3 margin it upheld the lower court, requiring that the dealer arbitrate its claim before a panel in Tokyo, as stipulated in the contract.

Justice Harry Blackmun wrote for the majority that the Federal Arbitration Act (FAA) was broad enough to require arbitration of statutory claims as well as contractual ones, extending a recent line of Court decisions favorable to arbitration. A controversial footnote, creating a possible "prospective waiver" doctrine that would allow a party to avoid arbitration under foreign law, has been much criticized by commentators and at the same time raised by many litigants. In 2009 the Eleventh Circuit found it valid for an injured cruise-ship worker, but two years later cast doubt on that conclusion.

In dissent, Justice John Paul Stevens argued that antitrust claims were too complex and important to be left to arbitrators and that in any event none of the claims were arbitrable under the terms of the contract itself. He expressed incredulousness that his colleagues would require an American company to arbitrate a claim under American antitrust law before a panel of foreign arbitrators.

While the case formed an important part of the Court's expansion of arbitrability in the late 20th and early 21st centuries, it could not have reached a court today. In 2002, after years of lobbying by the National Automobile Dealers Association, Congress passed the Motor Vehicle Franchise Contract Arbitration Fairness Act, which prohibited mandatory predispute arbitration clauses in motor vehicle dealership franchise agreements. President George W. Bush signed it into law, the first time a specific exception to the FAA had been legislated since the Court began expanding its scope.

== Underlying dispute ==
In 1979 Soler was incorporated in San Juan, Puerto Rico, and became a Chrysler-Plymouth dealer, doing business in the Pueblo Viejo district of the nearby suburb of Guaynabo. It and Mitsubishi Motors, a joint venture of Chrysler and Mitsubishi Heavy Industries, incorporated in Geneva, Switzerland, concluded two separate agreements to this effect: a distributor agreement with Chrysler and separate sales procedure agreements with Chrysler and Mitsubishi. The latter contained arbitration clauses requiring that any disputes under them be arbitrated in Japan under the rules of the Japan Commercial Arbitration Association (JCAA). The goal of the manufacturer and dealer was to introduce the small cars Mitsubishi made for both Chrysler and itself to the Puerto Rican market, for which they were considered ideal.

Soler did excellent business in its first two years, selling more than twice the number of vehicles set in its quota. As the market began to slow down in late 1981, the relationship between Soler and Mitsubishi began to break down. The dealer had trouble meeting sales targets under a higher quota, and Mitsubishi withheld shipments of new vehicles. Eventually 966 destined for Soler were stored near its factories in Japan. Soler began having trouble financing its purchases of new vehicles.

Mitsubishi logo

Seeing that other Japanese car makers were allowing their dealers in Puerto Rico to transship excess inventory to Latin America and the continental United States, Soler asked if it could do the same. Mitsubishi refused, saying the vehicles were customized for the Puerto Rican market. They lacked heaters and defoggers that they would have needed on the mainland, and their engines could not run on the lower-grade leaded gasoline sold in many Latin American countries at that time. Further, Soler had no experience with maritime shipping and would not been able to meet its service obligations under warranty for transshipped cars and trucks. Mitsubishi also was concerned that transshipments to the continental U.S. would be seen as skirting the voluntary import restraints Japanese automakers had been practicing in the American market to mitigate the potential political backlash from their distressed American counterparts.

Soler would later claim that it was told the real reason for the refusal to allow transshipping was that Mitsubishi and Chrysler had divided their territories, informally agreeing that the former brand would have preference outside the mainland U.S. while Chrysler maintained it domestically. The dealership then began to suspect that Mitsubishi intended to sabotage its business in order to replace it with a wholly owned subsidiary once the brand had been established in Puerto Rico. Early in 1982 Soler stopped paying storage costs for the vehicles in Japan, claiming it had disowned them. Later that year the franchise agreement either ended or was terminated.

== Lower courts ==
Mitsubishi sued in federal district court for Puerto Rico, alleging various breaches of the sales procedure agreement. Soler countersued, alleging violations of the federal Automobile Dealers' Day in Court Act, which allowed civil suits by dealerships for damage due to bad faith on the part of the franchisor. and its equivalent territorial statute. They also included antitrust claims under the Sherman Act, claiming that Mitsubishi was purposely driving it out of the motor vehicle retail business with the intent of replacing Soler with its own wholly owned subsidiary.

Mitsubishi's response was a motion to the judge to compel arbitration as mandated by the agreement. The court ordered most of the contractual claims arbitrated, but reserved jurisdiction on the statutory claims alleged by Soler, including antitrust. Soler made an interlocutory appeal to the First Circuit Court of Appeals, whose jurisdiction includes Puerto Rico, arguing that all its statutory counterclaims were not covered by the arbitration clause, and that Sherman Act claims could not be arbitrated in any event.

=== Appeals court ===
In 1983 a three-judge panel of Levin H. Campbell, then the circuit's chief judge, Frank M. Coffin and Hugh Henry Bownes, heard the case. Near the end of the year they handed down their decision. Unanimously they ruled for Mitsubishi on the statutory claims, holding them within the ambit of the arbitration clause. However, they also said, the Sherman Act claims could be litigated as they were not so parochial to American law, and were too important to U.S. public policy to leave to arbitrators.

Coffin wrote for the panel that although the agreement was governed by Swiss law, the scope of the arbitration clause was within the court's jurisdiction. The Federal Arbitration Act preempted Puerto Rican law on the subject, which, he noted, Soler tacitly acknowledged by arguing that the Puerto Rico Dealers' Act (PRDA) was implicitly incorporated into the agreement, since it explicitly incorporated savings and separability clauses from the distributorship agreement that violated the PRDA. He called this argument "tortured", since neither was actually incorporated into the sales procedure agreement as Soler claimed. Nor was the arbitration clause limited to contractual claims.

"Soler's Sherman Act counterclaim poses a murkier problem," Coffin wrote. It rested on the claim that, by refusing to allow transshipment of unsold vehicles, Mitsubishi was dividing markets. Further anticompetitive practices alleged were wrongful termination of Soler's franchise, and the refusal to ship cars and parts. Mitsubishi responded with its practical objections to the transshipments, that the franchise had expired without being renewed and that the shipments were halted sometimes at Soler's request and sometimes for lack of an acceptable letter of credit. Most of these, Coffin concluded, were differences over the execution of the contract and therefore covered by the arbitration clause.

"The important question now before us," Coffin continued, "is whether, despite such coverage, they are nonarbitrable because of a judicially created policy, hitherto applied only to 'domestic' contracts involving United States citizens, reserving antitrust issues for judicial determination." After oral argument, he recounted, the court had concluded this was a question of first impression and sought guidance from the federal government. The Justice Department responded with an amicus curiae brief, joined by the State Department's Legal Advisor, urging the court to uphold that tradition in this case. The First Circuit agreed.

Coffin found three issues relevant to that determination. The policy he referred to was the Second Circuit's holding in American Safety Equipment v. J.P. Maguire & Co.: "We do not believe that Congress intended such claims to be resolved elsewhere than in the courts." Several other circuits had affirmed that precedent. "We conclude, therefore, that the nonarbitrability of antitrust issues in domestic contract disputes is established as solid and sound doctrine."

However, this was not a domestic contract dispute but one between an American company and a Japanese one, whose contract, governed by Swiss law, called for any disputes to be arbitrated in Tokyo. Coffin said there were two more questions. "The first is: is the American antitrust ethic and system of law so 'parochial' that insistence on the application of the nonarbitrability of antitrust issues to international agreements would be anathema to other countries and would incite retaliation?" This concern had motivated the Supreme Court in deciding to hold an American firm to its agreement to litigate in London." in The Bremen v. Zapata Off-Shore Co., a key forum selection case.

"We doubt that other nations are ignorant of the primacy we accord to antitrust law," Coffin wrote. The government's amicus brief had advised that German law similarly prohibited disputes under its corresponding statutes from being arbitrated, and the Treaty of Rome which established what was then known as the European Union had five articles devoted to forbidding or restricting anti-competitive practices. "[W]hether or not other nations agree with United States law and attitudes relating to competition, it is extremely doubtful that they would describe them as 'parochial' in the sense of being petty provincialisms," he concluded.

The second question was whether any policy applied that would specifically prevent foreign concerns from arbitrating antitrust claims brought against them by American companies. Coffin again readily found the answer:

... the insulation of agreements with some international coloration from the antitrust exception would go far to limit it to the most minor and insignificant of business dealings. Indeed, suppliers and sellers could achieve immunity from antitrust law threats and sanctions by the simple expedient of co-opting some foreign or international entity into the arrangement. Specifically, the sovereign sway of antitrust law and policy in the United States economy would be hopelessly fragmented if, say, all domestic manufacturers with overseas partners, suppliers, or financers could force all their dealers and distributors to arbitrate their antitrust claims ... We conclude that the nonarbitrability of antitrust issues is an American doctrine that is alive, well, justified both in its conception and in its application to at least the kind of international agreement we confront in this case—an agreement governing the sales and distribution of vehicles in the United States.

But that conclusion was not enough. The court next had to look at that policy in light of whether it would be permitted under the Convention on the Recognition and Enforcement of Foreign Arbitral Awards, known as the New York Convention, negotiated in 1958 under United Nations auspices and acceded to by the United States in 1958. "[It] was preceded by very little helpful history, and followed by very little illuminating history or adjudication," wrote Coffin. "We work with a scattering of crumbs—and, hopefully, a sound sense of the balance struck by the Convention between deeply felt national policies and the desire to facilitate international arbitration." He found its language at first contradictory, requiring that any matter found arbitrable in a member country be arbitrated, but also saying that awards need not be enforced if they were found against the public policy of the country being asked to do so."

Coffin found guidance in resolving this problem first from an opinion he'd written in another case two years earlier which led him to exclude from Convention coverage those arbitration clauses found defective though fraud, mistake, duress, and waiver. This was not one of those cases. "The precise question we ask," he wrote, "is whether a matter that has been barred by unanimous judicial precedent for a decade and a half from resolution by arbitration, because of a multiplicity of solid reasons that lose no pertinence or weight in an international context, is a matter 'capable of settlement by arbitration'". He found this very broad, as any dispute could theoretically be solved that way.

For guidance, Coffin found a State Department memo to the Senate at the time of ratification to be useful. It noted that that clause was meant to account for the laws in member states that forbade certain matters from being arbitrated, and cited laws in some U.S. states that specifically applied that prohibition to real estate title disputes. Commentary on the Convention noted the same issue with the language. "We therefore conclude that an agreement to arbitrate antitrust issues is not 'an agreement within the meaning of' ... the Convention because such an agreement does not concern 'a subject matter capable of settlement by arbitration'", he concluded."

There was nevertheless still "a considerable roadblock" in the form of Scherk v. Alberto–Culver, Inc., a 1971 case where, again faced with a dispute between a domestic and a foreign company where arbitrability was at issue, the Supreme Court had ordered the parties to arbitration. If that case were applied broadly, Coffin noted, again there would be almost no inarbitrable dispute. And, since part of the claim involved allegations of securities fraud, the respondent relied on Wilko v. Swan, where the Court had held such claims were inarbitrable.

Coffin distinguished the case at hand in several ways. First, the Scherk Court had not considered the case within the context of the convention. Second, the older case had involved a dispute over the status of foreign trademarks, a decision which necessarily involved foreign law, whereas "the parties here could not be blind to the obvious fact that American law would normally apply to any claim of monopolization or restraint of trade". Third, as he had already discussed, antitrust was not a peculiar and parochial American concern. Fourth was the different policies underlying the respective laws: while the securities laws in Scherk were meant to protect individual investors,

[t]he policy underlying the antitrust laws, however, is not to protect individual companies, but to protect competition ... Antitrust laws ... protect the general public by preserving a competitive atmosphere that keeps prices down in an entire industry or in a group of related industries. The strength of the public interest in private enforcement of antitrust laws is illustrated by the fact that successful antitrust plaintiffs are allowed to recover treble damages, while securities plaintiffs may only recover their actual damages. If we engage in a Scherk-type balancing exercise, therefore, we must weigh the private party's interest in the arbitration of international contract disputes against the public's interest in the preservation of economic order in the United States. Such a balancing exercise can have only one result: to enforce the private arbitration clause at the expense of public policy would be "unreasonable".

== Before the Court ==
Both parties appealed to the Supreme Court. Arbitration proceedings continued, as both parties paid the fees and the JCAA assembled a panel to hear the case. In September 1984, immediately after Mitsubishi presented its case to the panel, Soler declared bankruptcy, resulting in an automatic stay. Shortly afterward, the Court granted certiorari

Amici briefs were filed by several parties. The American Arbitration Association urged reversal of the holding on the Sherman Act claims; the National Automobile Dealers Association (NADA) urged reversal of the other aspect of the holding. The Solicitor General's office filed one on behalf of the federal government in support of Soler. The International Chamber of Commerce and the commonwealth of Puerto Rico also shared their thoughts on the case in briefs.

=== Oral argument ===
The Court heard oral arguments in March 1985. Wayne Cross argued for Mitsubishi and Benjamin Ramon-Rodriguez for Soler. In addition, Jerrold Joseph Ganzfried was allowed some time to argue for the federal government in support of Soler.

==== Mitsubishi ====
Cross repeatedly asserted that there was just one question for the justices to consider: "Whether a party's contractual right to arbitrate antitrust disputes can be frustrated absent such a countervailing federal policy found in a federal statute." In support of this he cited a case the Court had decided unanimously two weeks earlier, Dean Witter Reynolds Inc. v. Byrd, where it had upheld a request for arbitration of securities fraud claims under state law even though the parallel claims under federal law were still to be litigated. "The preeminent concern of Congress in passing the [FAA]," Cross quoted from Justice Thurgood Marshall's opinion in that case, "was to enforce private agreements into which parties had entered, and that concern requires that we rigorously enforce agreements to arbitrate ... at least absent a countervailing policy manifested in another federal statute."

Cross initially rebuffed efforts by the justices to ask about the issue still being argued by Soler, that the other statutory claims were non-arbitrable as well. He declined initially, reminding them that the two lower courts had held otherwise. After he was reminded that they were still making the argument, he said that he did not think it would be applicable to their specific claims.

He continued to the specifics of his argument. "We submit that the circuit court's reliance upon the American Safety case is fundamentally at odds with the purpose of the Federal Arbitration Act." In Byrd and other recent cases, the court had affirmed "a strong national policy favoring arbitration," as it had put it in Moses H. Cone Memorial Hospital v. Mercury Construction Corp., and he saw no reason to stop here. However, when challenged on how the Court could reach his desired result without overruling American Safety and thus avoid the question of whether purely domestic antitrust claims were arbitrable, he pointed the justices to Scherk. "I did not read [it] ... as overruling Wilko so much as a limitation on Wilko in international conduct."

The justices had some concerns about the international nature of the case. Could arbitrators overseas simply decide to ignore American law in deciding the antitrust claim? Cross said that it was not likely, from what he understood, and that in any event arbitrators had handled cases as complex, if not more than, antitrust claims and so were not incapable of the instant case. He called the American Safety doctrine "a usurpation of power."

==== Soler ====
Rodriguez-Ramon laid out the facts of the case at length in order to bolster his case that the arbitration clause should not be applied to matters the parties had not expressly agreed to arbitrate such as the statutory claims. "You have a fairly hard row to hoe here in getting us to change that," one justice told him, acknowledging the lower-court rulings. Rodriguez-Ramon cited the efficiency and expediency offered by arbitration as factors the Court had held in its favor, and contrasted that with his now-bankrupt client, who would have to take all his witnesses and evidence to Japan for a case to be heard in that country's language.

Asked why, given the clear advantage that seemed to offer, Mitsubishi would have written into what Rodriguez-Ramon contended was an adhesion contract such a narrow arbitration clause, the lawyer insisted that "Mitsubishi only considered the possibility of arbitrating commercial contractual controversy." Why else, he suggested, would the language of the arbitration clause have specifically mentioned the sections of the contract to which it applied? And even if it had been intended so broadly, he reminded the Court that it had held in many other cases that some statutory claims could not be arbitrated.

Further, both the FAA and the Convention allowed for this distinction. "Finally, in terms of antitrust litigation, what are we talking about?" Rodriguez-Ramon concluded. "An antitrust litigant in this country has a right to litigate before a court and before his peers. He is entitled to have a trial by jury. He is entitled to be heard by 12 of his peers concerning whether the defendant has committed ... a restraint of trade."

Lastly, Rodriguez-Ramon distinguished Soler's case from Scherk by two factors. First, the contract had not been negotiated as it had been in the older case; and second, the contract in Scherk called for performance overseas while Soler had to make its performance in a U.S. territory. Nor did he find Southland Corp. v. Keating, in which the Court held the FAA applied to contracts executed under state law, applicable, since in that case the Court had considered a law unique to California whereas here it was dealing with a law parallel to a federal statute that almost every state had enacted.

"The consequence of a contrary holding by this honorable Court, I respectfully submit, are ominous," said Rodriguez-Ramon. If it allowed arbitration such as the one his client was preparing for, almost any large international corporation would be able to word contracts so as to skirt American law. [A]ll these people will have to go to arbitrate outside of the continental United States, in foreign arbitration areas different from the United States, possibly under different languages, under different juridical criteria for the adjudication of controversies."

==== United States ====
"The Court of Appeals properly accommodated the three interests that are at issue in this case," Ganzfried told the justices. "[T]hose interests are, one, the primacy of antitrust law in preserving our economic system of free competition; two, the general encouragement of arbitration as a means of resolving private disputes; and three, our commitment to an international convention that requires enforcement of agreements to arbitrate with very limited exceptions."

An agreement to arbitrate antitrust claims would not be enforceable, he maintained, even if it specified members of Congress or senior federal judges as arbitrators. "The fact is that they are operating in a system in which there is no substantive appellate review." Even if that was part of what the parties bargained for, he maintained, the underlying public policy was too important.

Private actions had always been intended under antitrust law, Ganzfried reminded the justices. He raised the possibility that a manufacturer could, through agreements with all its distributors, create "a nice, tidy buffer from the American antitrust laws", since the indirect purchasers would likewise lack standing to sue under the Illinois Brick doctrine. When it was pointed out that the FAA was passed after the antitrust laws, "the history of the enforcement of the antitrust laws strongly indicates that it was not even considered a remote possibility worth discussing that antitrust actions would be subject to arbitration." There was no record anyone had been able to find of private parties arbitrating one.

Cross, allowed five minutes for rebuttal, addressed Ganzfried's closing observation that under JCAA rules, testimony was not taken under oath. "[I]t may be that the oath taking process has something to do with the culture of Japan where taking an oath doesn't have quite the significance that it does here." He admitted that the arbitrators still had to consider the credibility of the witnesses, but called Ganzfried's claim "a straw man."

== Decision ==
The Court announced its decision in July, near the end of term. Harry Blackmun wrote for a five-justice majority that affirmed the First Circuit's holding that the statutory claims were arbitrable and reversed it by holding the antitrust claims arbitrable as well. John Paul Stevens' lengthy dissent argued primarily that the arbitration clause was inapplicable to the dispute, and the precedent against arbitrating antitrust claims was far stronger than the majority represented it to be. Justice Lewis Powell took no part in the case.

=== Majority opinion ===
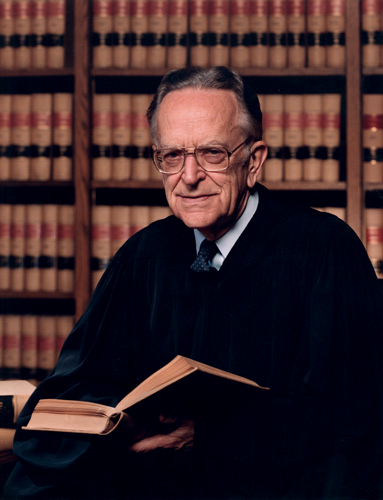
Justice Harry Blackmun, who wrote the majority opinion

"[W]e find no warrant in the Arbitration Act for implying in every contract within its ken a presumption against arbitration of statutory claims," Blackmun wrote in response to Soler's claims under the Car Dealers' Day In Court Act. The Court's own recent decisions on arbitration had been very supportive, and he saw no reason to hold, in their light, that they did not apply only to contractual disputes. While conversely not every statutory claim was suitable for arbitration, "the Act itself provides no basis for disfavoring agreements to arbitrate statutory claims by skewing the otherwise hospitable inquiry into arbitrability ... Soler's concern for statutorily protected classes provides no reason to color the lens through which the arbitration clause is read."

The antitrust claims led to a lengthier discussion. First, Blackmun noted that in both Scherk and The Bremen, the Court had found the international nature of the dispute was a special circumstance justifying arbitration. "We must weigh the concerns of American Safety against a strong belief in the efficacy of arbitral procedures for the resolution of international commercial disputes and an equal commitment to the enforcement of freely negotiated choice-of-forum clauses."

"[W]e confess to some skepticism of certain aspects of the American Safety doctrine," Blackmun wrote. Where the First Circuit had expressed concern that the underlying contract may have been adhesive, he said that suspicion was too narrow a ground to defeat the arbitration clause, especially since the Court's Prima Paint separability doctrine had held that the validity of the arbitration clause itself could be attacked in court. He also doubted that even some of the appellate courts which had followed American Safety truly believed that antitrust cases were too complex for arbitrators to handle. Nor did he believe that arbitators might inherently be too conflicted.

The last of the First Circuit's justifications Blackmun considered was the public policy doctrine argument. While he agreed that this was demonstrated by the treble damages provision, "[its] importance ... does not compel the conclusion that it may not be sought outside an American court." In fact, the Court itself had found when inquiring into the legislative history of the Sherman Act in Brunswick Corp. v. Pueblo Bowl-O-Mat, Inc. that the treble damages were primarily intended to help individual litigants and not to serve a greater public policy.

"To be sure," Blackmun qualified,

the international arbitral tribunal owes no prior allegiance to the legal norms of particular states; hence, it has no direct obligation to vindicate their statutory dictates. The tribunal, however, is bound to effectuate the intentions of the parties. Where the parties have agreed that the arbitral body is to decide a defined set of claims which includes, as in these cases, those arising from the application of American antitrust law, the tribunal therefore should be bound to decide that dispute in accord with the national law giving rise to the claim.

The interests of American law and the American courts would, he noted, be served on the enforcement of the claim, which under the New York Convention individual countries could refuse to do if the verdict or award were contrary to their public policy.

Blackmun concluded by noting the increase in international trade, and with it arbitration to resolve disputes. "The controversies that international arbitral institutions are called upon to resolve have increased in diversity as well as in complexity," he observed. "Yet the potential of these tribunals for efficient disposition of legal disagreements arising from commercial relations has not yet been tested." He exhorted American courts "to subordinate domestic notions of arbitrability to the international policy favoring commercial arbitration" when faced with similar cases in the future.

=== Dissent ===
Stevens' lengthy dissent was joined by William Brennan and, with the exception of Part II, where Stevens argued against allowing statutory claims to be arbitrated, Thurgood Marshall. "I am convinced," Stevens began, "that the Court of Appeals' construction of the arbitration clause is erroneous, and because I strongly disagree with this Court's interpretation of the relevant federal statutes, I respectfully dissent."

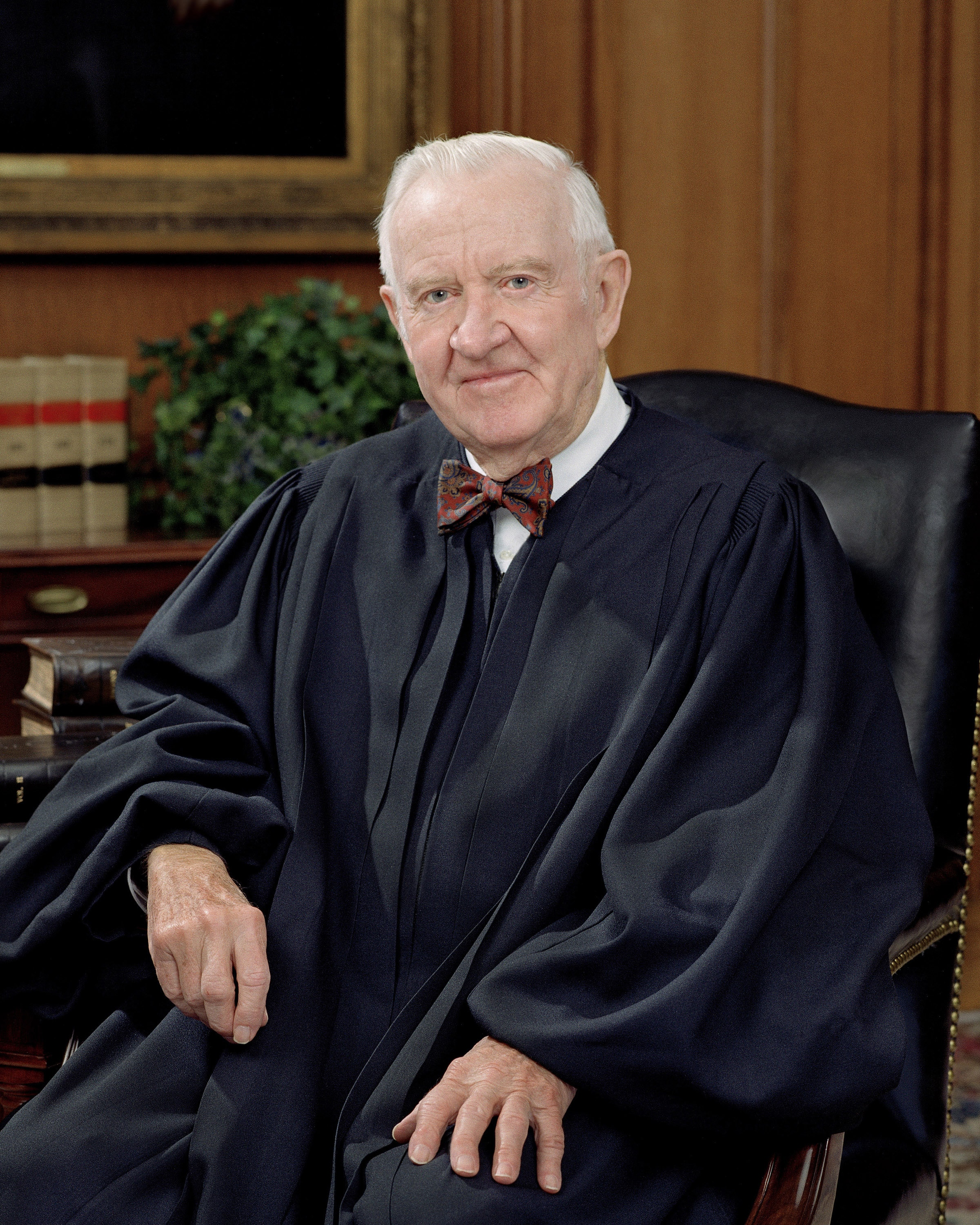
Justice John Paul Stevens (pictured in 2006)

First, Stevens observed that the arbitration clause was in the sales procedure agreement, to which Chrysler as well Soler and Mitsubishi were party. It only applied to two-party disputes, yet Soler's antitrust claim was against both manufacturers. "Only by stretching the language of the arbitration clause far beyond its ordinary meaning could one possibly conclude that it encompasses this three-party dispute." Second, it only covered five of the 15 articles of the contract, and none of those five addressed areas which had given rise to Soler's antitrust claim. "The federal policy favoring arbitration cannot sustain the weight that the Court assigns to it. A clause requiring arbitration of all claims 'relating to' a contract surely could not encompass a claim that the arbitration clause was itself part of a contract in restraint of trade."

This, Stevens noted, was the first time the Court had held a statutory claim, as opposed to a merely contractual one, to be arbitrable. However, in its longer line of cases on labor arbitration, the Court had consistently held that statutory claims could not be arbitrated. "It is reasonable to assume that most lawyers and executives would not expect the language in the standard arbitration clause to cover federal statutory claims."

He reiterated past holdings in antitrust cases where the Court had indeed recognized the public-policy role of private actions, particularly by noting the uniqueness of the treble-damages provision when first passed. "There are, in addition, several unusual features of the antitrust enforcement scheme that unequivocally require rejection of any thought that Congress would tolerate private arbitration of antitrust claims in lieu of the statutory remedies that it fashioned": Only federal courts had jurisdiction, Congress had required that depositions in Sherman Act cases be made public, and the Clayton Act allowed that a judgement or decree in a Sherman Act case was prima facie proof of wrongdoing for actions under it. "[I]t is not surprising that all of the federal courts that have considered the question have uniformly and unhesitatingly concluded that agreements to arbitrate federal antitrust issues are not enforceable," he wrote, citing American Safety once again.

This Court would be well advised to endorse the collective wisdom of the distinguished judges of the Courts of Appeals who have unanimously concluded that the statutory remedies fashioned by Congress for the enforcement of the antitrust laws render an agreement to arbitrate antitrust disputes unenforceable ... Despotic decisionmaking of this kind is fine for parties who are willing to agree in advance to settle for a best approximation of the correct result in order to resolve quickly and inexpensively any contractual dispute that may arise in an ongoing commercial relationship. Such informality, however, is simply unacceptable when every error may have devastating consequences for important businesses in our national economy, and may undermine their ability to compete in world markets.

In his final section, Stevens responded to the majority's arguments about the international nature of the dispute making arbitration more important. The convention had fully anticipated that signatory nations had or were likely to declare, through their own laws, that certain disputes were not arbitrable. "[T]he international obligations of the United States permit us to honor Congress' commitment to the exclusive resolution of antitrust disputes in the federal courts," much as how foreign courts had held that certain categories of disputes, including analogous competition-law disputes, in their countries could not be arbitrated. The State Department's brief had promised that other signatory countries to the convention would not be upset if antitrust claims were exempted due to those policies, he reminded the majority.

Since the majority had tacitly accepted this by not grounding its argument to the contrary in any outside support, Stevens noted, it "seeks refuge in an obtuse application of [Scherk]." Soler's case was, for him, distinguished from Scherk by the same issue that Court had distinguished it from Wilko: the claim involved purely American law. "I consider it perfectly clear that the rules of American antitrust law must govern the claim of an American automobile dealer that he has been injured by an international conspiracy to restrain trade in the American automobile market ... the same antitrust questions would be presented if Mitsubishi were owned by two American companies instead of by one American and one Japanese partner. When Mitsubishi enters the American market and plans to engage in business in that market over a period of years, it must recognize its obligation to comply with American law and to be subject to the remedial provisions of American statutes." And that, to Stevens, meant the Car Dealers' Day in Court Act as much as the Sherman Act.

"The Court's repeated incantation of the high ideals of 'international arbitration' creates the impression that this case involves the fate of an institution designed to implement a formula for world peace," Stevens concluded.

But just as it is improper to subordinate the public interest in enforcement of antitrust policy to the private interest in resolving commercial disputes, so is it equally unwise to allow a vision of world unity to distort the importance of the selection of the proper forum for resolving this dispute. Like any other mechanism for resolving controversies, international arbitration will only succeed if it is realistically limited to tasks it is capable of performing well—the prompt and inexpensive resolution of essentially contractual disputes between commercial partners ... In my opinion, the elected representatives of the American people would not have us dispatch an American citizen to a foreign land in search of an uncertain remedy for the violation of a public right that is protected by the Sherman Act ... Unlike the Congress that enacted the Sherman Act in 1890, the Court today does not seem to appreciate the value of economic freedom.

== Subsequent proceedings ==
On remand almost two months later, the First Circuit affirmed the entire original district court decision, allowing for arbitration to resume. In September Mitsubishi moved in Bankruptcy Court to vacate the automatic stay that had been in place pending the outcome of the case at the Supreme Court. Soler began an adversary proceeding in bankruptcy court, reiterating its original complaints against the manufacturer. A separate answer to Mitsubishi's motion was filed in October, in which Soler argued that its desperate financial straits prevented it from being "legally or equitably compelled" to return to Tokyo.

Mitsubishi Motors Corp. v. Soler Chrysler-Plymouth, Inc.
- Court: United States Court of Appeals for the First Circuit
- Full case name: Mitsubishi Motors Corp. v. Soler Chrysler-Plymouth, Inc.
- Argued: February 5 1987
- Decided: April 1 1987
- Citation: 814 F. 2d 844

Case history
- Prior history: Arbitration ordered, 723 F.2d 155; rev'd in part and aff'd in part, 473 U.S. 614

Holding
- District court had discretion to lift automatic stay of arbitration between parties without hearing where one party failed to argue its own bankruptcy, filed long before, until appeal of district court action.

Court membership
- Judges sitting: Frank M. Coffin, Hugh Henry Bownes, Juan R. Torruella

Case opinions
- Majority: Coffin

Laws applied
- 11 U.S.C. § 362(a)

Mitsubishi responded by filing in district court to withdraw reference of both actions from bankruptcy court to its own jurisdiction. Soler consented to a stay of those proceedings while the district court considered the motion. In April 1986 that action was removed to district court. After its motion to reconsider was denied, Soler again appealed to the First Circuit.

Coffin and Bownes were again on the panel, this time joined by Juan R. Torruella. They affirmed the district court unanimously, citing res judicata. "Here, Soler failed to raise the issue of its inability to finance the arbitration in Japan before any of the courts involved in the series of proceedings initiated by Mitsubishi's attempt to compel arbitration," Coffin wrote. It had declared bankruptcy before the Supreme Court's certiorari grant, so at all times since then it was aware of the issue.

The first question, then, was whether it had had an adequate opportunity to do so, regardless of whether it actually had. Soler claimed that it could not have done so at the Supreme Court since the record was already fixed. Therefore, it argued, neither there nor on remand could it have done so.

"We are unpersuaded by Soler's argument," Coffin responded, "and view this latest round of litigation as yet another episode in Soler's long series of misguided efforts to avoid arbitration with Mitsubishi at all costs." The dealership had cited no legal basis for why it could not have added the bankruptcy to its record before the Supreme Court, and Coffin could not find anywhere in the record where it had brought it up. As for remand, while it was not uncommon for parties to raise new issues there, "but Soler was content to remain silent and await a second bite at the apple before the bankruptcy court. Soler has offered no compelling argument to justify its silence at this stage of the proceedings, nor can we even conceive of one." He described its behavior as a "'sandbagging' strategy of the type that the doctrine of res judicata is designed to prevent ... This we cannot tolerate."

The second question Coffin described as "more troublesome": did the district court abuse its discretion by lifting the stay without a hearing? The bankruptcy code required one, but the district court had done so simply after reviewing the record. While normally the appeals court would have reversed the district court and ordered a hearing, "given the unique circumstances and history of this case, we cannot fault the district court for determining that the stay should be lifted expeditiously in accordance with the prior orders of the Supreme Court and this court."

"Soler's only colorable argument for maintaining the stay was its inability to finance the Japanese arbitration, precisely the issue it was precluded from raising at such a late date," Coffin wrote. Since it did not, the district court did not need to hold a hearing; there was no other argument.

Our review of the record leads us to conclude that the district court was merely attempting to expedite a process that has been slowed time and time again by Soler's imaginative delaying tactics. Soler has repeatedly engaged in costly litigation, appeals, and other procedural maneuvers to avoid arbitration with Mitsubishi—and appears willing, even eager, to bear the financial burden that accompanies a full-scale antitrust trial in federal court—while simultaneously asserting its inability to pay for the arbitration in Japan.

== Subsequent jurisprudence ==
Two years later, in Shearson/American Express Inc. v. McMahon, the Court built on Mitsubishi Motors, and again overruled a long-standing Second Circuit precedent, holding that statutory claims of securities fraud under the Securities Exchange Act of 1934 were also arbitrable. Sandra Day O'Connor wrote for the majority that Mitsubishi Motors and its predecessor cases had helped dispel former judicial mistrust of arbitration; similarly, it dismissed public-policy arguments in support of the nonarbitrability of Racketeer Influenced and Corrupt Organizations Act (RICO) actions. Blackmun, dissenting this time, claimed that the majority was "in direct contradiction" of his opinion in Mitsubishi Motors, since it had rested on the lack of public policy intentions in the statute at issue rather than doubts about the suitability of the arbitral process. Two more years later, in 1989, the Court extended the FAA's reach over statutory disputes even further when it overruled Wilko v. Swan completely in Rodriguez de Quijas v. Shearson/American Express Inc., adding claims under the Securities Act of 1933 (effectively, all remaining possible securities fraud claims) to those that could be arbitrated. By the late 1990s McMahon and Rodriguez were being described as the other two components of the "Mitsubishi Trilogy", due to their combined role in opening the doors to arbitration of other statutory claims, as the Court did with Age Discrimination in Employment Act (ADEA) claims in 1991's Gilmer v. Interstate/Johnson Lane Corp..

The Second Circuit was the first lower court to apply Mitsubishi in 1986 when it heard Genesco, Inc. v. T. Kakiuchi & Co., Ltd., a case with many similarities. Genesco, a clothing manufacturer, had brought antitrust claims against both its American supplier of fabric and its eponymous Japanese parent company, alleging they and one of Genesco's employees conspired to destroy it by consistently selling it overpriced and/or low-quality material in violation of RICO and the Robinson–Patman Act, along with tortious interference and fraud claims. The two defendants sought arbitration before the JCAA per their contracts. After the district court stayed the fraud and RICO claims against the American subsidiary, both it and the parent company appealed.

Richard J. Cardamone wrote for a panel that followed Mitsbushi's analysis: first holding the arbitration clause valid, then inquiring into whether the claims came under its scope. Since, as the Mitsubishi majority had found, the alleged bad acts arose from the activities covered by the contract, all save the RICO and tortious interference claims were arbitrable. It told the district court to stay even the RICO claims, however, pending the outcome of McMahon at the Supreme Court (which ruled them arbitrable).

=== Abandonment of American Safety ===
Since Mitsubishi had explicitly avoided the question of whether purely domestic antitrust claims were arbitrable, lower courts mostly proceeded with caution. A 1987 Southern District of New York case noted that "the foundations of the American Safety doctrine have been significantly eroded" and speculated that the Supreme Court would likely overrule that case if the question came before them. Four years later, after Rodriguez, William C. Conner, another judge from that district, held that along with the later cases, Mitsubishi should be read to make domestic antitrust claims arbitrable as well; the Second Circuit affirmed without an opinion.

An explicit overruling of American Safety at the appellate level came from the Ninth Circuit. A Title VII employment-discrimination case it heard in 1994, Nghiem v. NEC Electronic, Inc., included an antitrust claim among its appeals of an arbitration award. Judge Diarmuid O'Scannlain wrote that while the circuit had followed American Safety since 1984, the post-Mitsubishi cases, including Gilmer, "the Supreme Court has indeed undermined the reasoning behind [that case]". He noted the Court's later reliance on Mitsubishi for ordering other statutory claims arbitrated and reiterated Blackmun's criticism of the American Safety doctrine. "Given the Court's meticulous step-by-step disembowelment of the American Safety doctrine, this circuit will no longer follow [it]. We hold that Mitsubishi effectively overruled American Safety and its progeny ..." The Eleventh Circuit followed suit in 1996, overruling its own precedent to comply with Mitsubishi.

=== Prospective-waiver dictum in footnote 19 ===
In his 19th footnote, Blackmun had admitted there was in the case a possible reason not to compel arbitration, raised in the federal government's brief: that, since the contract was governed by Swiss law, the arbitration panel could therefore decide to disregard the Sherman Act entirely and consider Soler's claims under that body of law. On the other side, the International Chamber of Commerce had conceded in its amicus brief that that could occur as well, though it considered the possibility unlikely. Blackmun allowed that this was a valid concern but countered that Mitsubishi had already stipulated at oral argument that American law would control the antitrust claims, mooting it in the instant case.

Should that issue actually arise in a future case, Blackmun observed, the proper time to raise it was not prior to the arbitration but afterwards, when the court would be asked to enforce the award. He added that "... in the event the choice-of-forum and choice-of-law clauses operated in tandem as a prospective waiver of a party's right to pursue statutory remedies for antitrust violations, we would have little hesitation in condemning the agreement as against public policy." Several subsequent cases, at the Supreme Court and in the Eleventh Circuit, all in admiralty law, have considered and applied that dictum.

In 1995, the Supreme Court decided Vimar Seguros y Reaseguros, S.A. v. M/V Sky Reefer. Fruit shipped from Morocco to New England via a Panamanian-flagged boat was found by the buyer to have been improperly stored and damaged; the buyer's insurer pursued an in rem action against the ship to recover. The bill of lading contained a clause calling for disputes to be arbitrated in Japan by the Tokyo Maritime Arbitration Commission (TOMAC); the buyer had cited the non-waiver provisions of the Carriage of Goods by Sea Act (COGSA) in opposition. Both the district court and the First Circuit compelled arbitration.

The petitioner argued that the Japanese Hague Rules, which would govern the arbitration, allowed them to recover less than COGSA would since it released the shipper from liability for the action of hired stevedores. In support they relied on the footnote 19 dictum. Anthony Kennedy, writing for a 7–1 majority, extended it slightly by observing that it was not clear at that point whether TOMAC actually would apply the Hague Rules instead of COGSA, and if it did and Vimar was unsatisfied it could then seek a remedy from American courts during enforcement.

Only once since then has the Court mentioned it. In 2009's 14 Penn Plaza LLC v. Pyett, it held that a collective bargaining agreement's arbitration clause required members of the signatory union to arbitrate ADEA claims. Clarence Thomas's majority opinion briefly noted in passing that under that dictum, "a substantive waiver of federally protected civil rights will not be upheld."

While the Ninth Circuit has said that it does not consider footnote 19's prospective-waiver dictum binding, and indeed seems to resent litigants raising it, the Eleventh Circuit has explored it at some length in two recent cases involving disputes between cruise-ship workers and the lines that employ them. In Thomas v. Carnival Corp., it held that an arbitration clause requiring a Philippine national to arbitrate a negligence claim there under Panamanian law, which had no equivalent of the Seamen's Wage Act on which the claim was based, worked in tandem to deny Thomas an opportunity for review by an American court, and was therefore null and void. "... [T]he possibility of such a result would counsel against being deferential in this circumstance," its per curiam opinion said, "as it is exactly the sort that the Supreme Court has described."

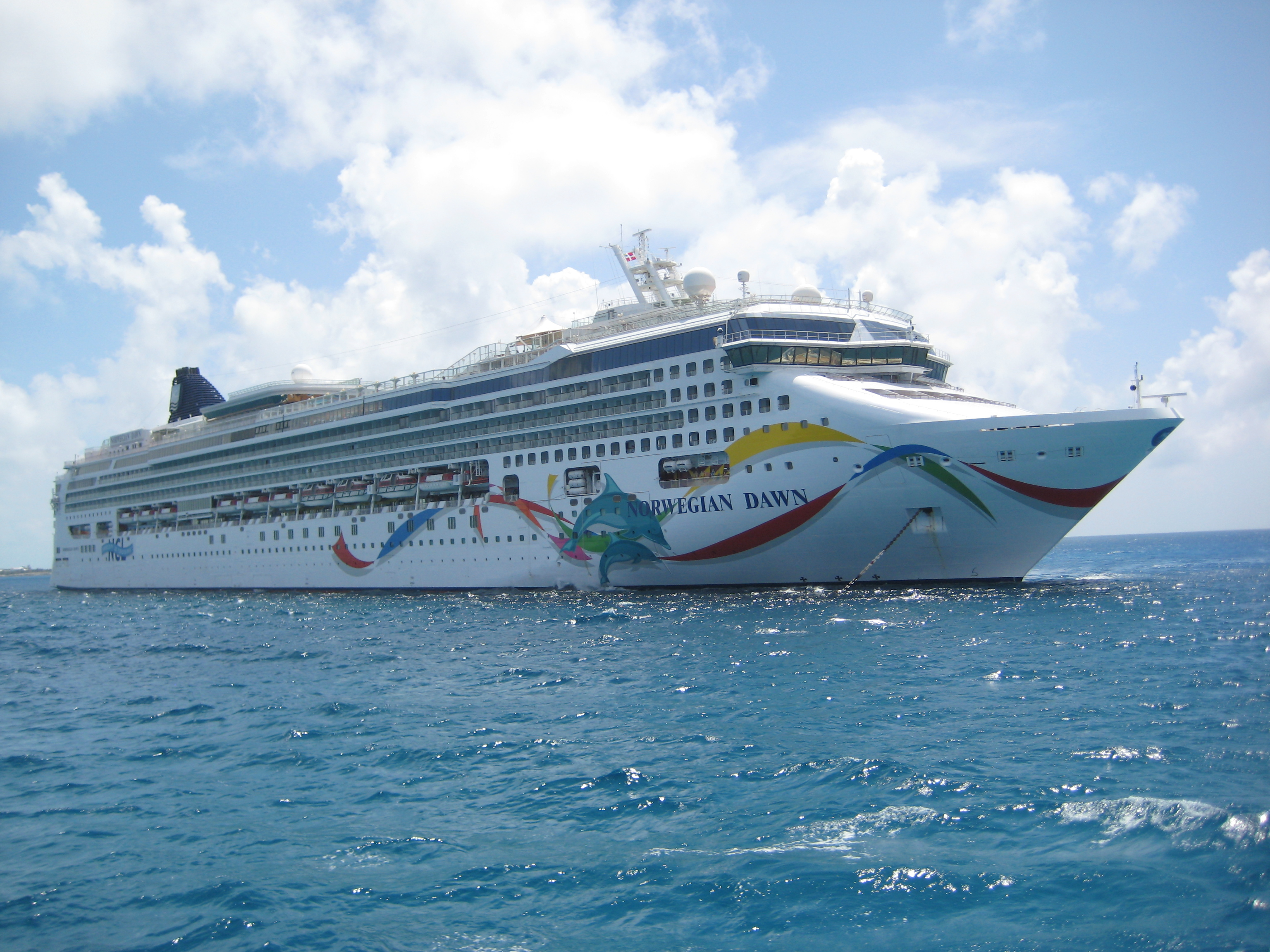
The Norwegian Dawn, where Lindo worked. Many cases considering footnote 19 have been brought by cruise ship employees

Two years later, in 2011, the circuit divided sharply over a similar case, Lindo v. NCL (Bahamas) Ltd., where footnote 19 was "hotly disputed." A Nicaraguan who suffered a back injury on the Norwegian Dawn challenged the Bahamanian-law arbitration mandated by his contract on the same grounds as Thomas. Frank M. Hull wrote a lengthy opinion that reviewed in detail all relevant case law up to Thomas and heavily criticized it. Thomas, Hull wrote, ignored Vimar and had ignored circuit precedent that under the convention, arbitration clauses could only be voided prior to the process for the same general grounds as contracts anywhere. It also failed to properly apply the convention, rendering its public-policy defense in error. Footnote 19, she wrote, was "indisputably dicta".

Rosemary Barkett, a member of the original Thomas panel, dissented. "I do not believe that Lindo must needlessly wait until after arbitration to raise his public policy argument," she wrote. The majority had read the Convention too narrowly, and footnote 19, far from being dicta, "was critical to the Court's reasoning and the outcome of the case. Merely because the Court did not find a prospective waiver there does not make that language—forming part of the Court's core reasoning—dicta." If it were, she observed, the Court would have said so in Vimar and Pyett.

She accused her colleagues of "effectively transform[ing] the enforcement of international arbitration agreements into the top U.S. public policy" by treating footnote 19 as dicta. "[T]here is nothing to suggest that the political branches ever intended such a result ... I believe the Supreme Court meant what it said in Mitsubishi."

== Motor Vehicle Franchise Contract Arbitration Fairness Act ==
In the wake of the decision, more automobile manufacturers began putting arbitration clauses in their contracts, and courts began enforcing them. Dealers opposed them, sometimes in court, since the ADDCA had been passed to give them a judicial forum for those disputes, as its popular name implied. Some took refuge in state laws regulating motor vehicle franchising that explicitly barred the enforcement of arbitration clauses. But in 1990 the Fourth Circuit struck that provision of Virginia's Motor Vehicle Dealer Licensing Act down as incompatible with the FAA under Southland Corp. v. Keating and the Supreme Court's other arbitration jurisprudence.

Dealers had lobbied Congress and the state legislatures for many years for ADDCA and its corresponding state statutes, through the National Automobile Dealers Association (NADA) and other groups, and saw the court holdings as an assault on the protections they had gained. They began lobbying Congress for an exception to the FAA that would make arbitration of such disputes voluntary. Early in the 21st century, the 107th Congress considered the Motor Vehicle Franchise Contract Arbitration Fairness Act (MVFCAFA), which would add new language to the ADDCA stating that "Whenever a motor vehicle franchise contract provides for the use of arbitration to resolve a controversy arising out of or relating to the contract, arbitration may be used to settle such controversy only if after such controversy arises both parties consent in writing to use arbitration to settle such controversy" and requiring "a written explanation of the factual and legal basis for the award."

Referring to Mitsubishi, "[t]he Supreme Court was not persuaded by the argument that only contractual disputes, not statutory rights, should be determined through mandatory binding arbitration even when the claims presented are complex and carry as many public policy implications as a claim under the Sherman Act," the Senate Judiciary Committee said in its report on the bill. After recounting some unsatisfactory dealer experiences with arbitration, it concluded that "[i]t is clear that dealers are being required to forfeit important rights and remedies afforded by [s]tate law as a condition of obtaining or renewing their motor vehicle franchise contracts" and that due to Mitsubishi and the other similar cases, it was necessary for Congress to create an exception to the FAA. A minority report criticized the MVFCAFA as "revers[ing] a long-standing congressional policy favoring arbitration in a manner that undermines the sanctity of contract." According to the U.S. Chamber of Commerce only a small fraction of dealers had franchise agreements with predispute arbitration clauses that would have been negated; some consumer groups like Public Citizen which had been lobbying against mandatory predispute arbitration clauses in consumer adhesion contracts actually opposed the MVFCAFA on the grounds that such clauses were far more common in contracts between dealers and consumers.

It was passed as a rider on that year's Justice Department appropriations bill, and went into effect later in the year after President George W. Bush signed it into law. "The three-paragraph Act is a landmark," Franchise Law Journal commented. "For the first time, a special-interest exemption to the FAA has become law."

In 2010, two associates at Nelson Mullins Riley & Scarborough in South Carolina reviewed how the MVFCAFA had been interpreted by the courts in the intervening eight years. "At first blush, [it] appeared to be a big win for automobile dealers," they observed. But courts had construed it narrowly, as applicable only to the actual franchise agreement and not any separate dealer-manufacturer agreements even where the disputed conduct touched on issues referenced in the franchise agreement. Most cases had thus turned on whether contract law in the state of the dispute allowed the separate agreement to be treated as incorporated by reference into the franchise agreement. Courts had also rejected in most cases a reading of the law as intended to protect dealers, holding that it may not be used by them to compel arbitration with the manufacturer when it would prefer to litigate. "Despite the Congressional attempt to tip the balance of power between dealers and manufacturers in favor of dealers, courts have allowed manufacturers to retain their ability to compel arbitration in many of the disputes that arise between dealers and manufacturers," they concluded.

== Analysis and commentary ==
Commentators have ascribed much importance to Mitsubishi Motors, calling it "landmark" and "significant". It has been discussed in both the context of domestic and international arbitration.

In the former area, critics of the increased role of arbitration in dispute resolution have objected to it strongly. Duke law professor Paul Carrington has complained that by denying the public policy behind the Sherman Act, the Court effectively repealed the treble-damages provision since there is no corresponding provision in Japanese competition law. Likewise, later decisions holding that the provisions of both the FAA and ADDCA can be satisfied by arbitration allow an older statute to effectively repeal a later one. "The Court has not explained the jurisprudence reflected in this intellectual gymnastic."

Ramona Lampley, a Wake Forest visiting professor who has since returned to private practice, calls the Mitsubishi trilogy the "vindication of statutory rights" trilogy. "Mitsubishi laid the cornerstone for the Court's sheltered fostering of arbitration agreements," she writes. However, "in a case intended to cast arbitration, even of remedial statutes, on equal or more favorable footing as the judicial forum, the Court crafted language that would soon give rise to a method for invalidating arbitration agreements" when litigants in later class actions were able to invalidate arbitration clauses by successfully questioning whether the process would vindicate their statutory rights.

Within the international-arbitration context, commentators have applauded the Court's support for the process but criticized its reasoning. Laurence Smith, a law student at Penn, criticizes the decision as an "unprincipled" route to the proper result Instead of the balancing test the Court used, he recommends a two-prong test based on the extraterritorial acceptance of U.S. antitrust law and the provisions of the convention.

Another writer gladdened to see more support for international arbitration, Thomas Carbonneau, nevertheless found much to agree with in Stevens' dissent. "[T]here is much that is unfortunate about [the majority]'s reasoning and methodology," he wrote. "[It] is misguided; it advances a distorted and disproportionate view of arbitration." Regulatory claims, he said, were by design best left to national courts, criticizing the Court's "anational" approach.

In Mitsubishi, the submission of the plaintiff's antitrust claim to Japanese arbitrators may well have deprived the plaintiff of its statutorily conferred rights. While recourse to extraterritorial application of domestic law is a very questionable means of creating a transnational rule of law, regulatory rights should not be eliminated by the fact of participation in international commerce unless a legislative determination so provides. Until public regulatory provisions of a truly international character exist and reflect an authentic consensus among sovereigns, national regulatory law is one of the few available means of creating limits upon transnational conduct.

He also found footnote 19 to be a "careless afterthought ... it is unlikely that such an award would ever come to the United States for enforcement." Other commentators have found that it either contradicts itself or the rest of the opinion, and/or offers no guidance to courts faced with such a case.

== See also ==
- Arbitration case law in the United States
- List of abrogated U.S. Supreme Court decisions
- List of United States Supreme Court cases, volume 473
- List of United States Supreme Court cases by the Burger Court
