= Shearson/American Express Inc. v. McMahon =

- Supreme Court of the United States

Argued March 3, 1987 Decided June 8, 1987
- Full case name: Shearson/American Express Inc., and Mary Ann McNulty v. Eugene McMahon, Julia McMahon, individually and as Trustees of the David J. Hodder & Son, Inc. Employee Pension Plan; the David J. Hodder & Son Inc. Profit Sharing Plan; the Laurie Funeral Home, Inc. Employee Pension Plan; the Laurie Funeral Home Profit Sharing Plan, Plaintiffs-Appellants-Cross-Appellees
- Docket no.: 86-44
- Citations: 482 U.S. 220 (more) 107 S. Ct. 2332; 96 L. Ed. 2d 185
- Argument: Oral argument

Case history
- Prior: Defense motion to compel arbitration granted, 618 F. Supp. 384 (S.D.N.Y. 1985); rev'd on appeal, 788 F.2d 94 (2d Cir. 1986)
- Subsequent: Preliminary injunction against plaintiffs granted and counsel sanctioned, 709 F. Supp. 369 (S.D.N.Y. 1989); sanctions rev'd on appeal, 896 F.2d 17 (2d Cir. 1990).

Holding
- Language of Securities Exchange Act of 1934 is different enough from Securities Act of 1933 that previous Court holding in Wilko v. Swan that nonwaiver provisions of latter held there to defeat arbitration clause cannot be so held in claims under the former; claims under Racketeer Influenced and Corrupt Organizations Act also arbitrable under Federal Arbitration Act. Second Circuit reversed and remanded.

Court membership
- Chief Justice William Rehnquist Associate Justices William J. Brennan Jr. · Byron White; Thurgood Marshall · Harry Blackmun; Lewis F. Powell Jr. · John P. Stevens; Sandra Day O'Connor · Antonin Scalia

Case opinions
- Majority: O'Connor, joined by Rehnquist, White, Powell, Scalia
- Concur/dissent: Blackmun, joined by Brennan, Marshall
- Concur/dissent: Stevens

Laws applied
- Racketeer Influenced and Corrupt Organizations Act, Federal Arbitration Act, Securities Exchange Act of 1934

Shearson/American Express Inc. v. McMahon, 482 U.S. 220 (1987), is a United States Supreme Court decision concerning arbitration of private securities fraud claims arising under the Securities Exchange Act of 1934. By a 5–4 margin the Court held that its holding in a 1953 case, Wilko v. Swan, that the nonwaiver provisions of the Securities Act of 1933 prevented the mandatory arbitration of such claims, did not apply to claims under the 1934 Act due to differences in the corresponding language of the two statutes, reversing a decision of the Second Circuit Court of Appeals that had affirmed what had been considered settled law, despite the lack of a precedent. It likewise held that claims under the Racketeer Influenced and Corrupt Organizations Act (RICO) were arbitrable, affirming an order from the district court that the Second Circuit had also upheld.

The question of whether claims under the 1934 Act were likewise exempt from the Federal Arbitration Act had first been raised in a 1974 case, Scherk v. Alberto-Culver Inc.. At that time Potter Stewart had found them not relevant to the case and upheld the arbitration order on the grounds that the case involved an international dispute. They had resurfaced in the previous term, in Justice Byron White's concurrence in Dean Witter Reynolds Inc. v. Byrd. Lower courts began embracing White's analysis, eventually creating a conflict in the circuits on appeal.

Justice Sandra Day O'Connor wrote the majority opinion, reiterating and deepening White's analysis. Harry Blackmun dissented for himself and justices Brennan and Marshall, who had written for a unanimous Court in Byrd. John Paul Stevens wrote a separate dissent. Both of those dissents concurred in the holding that the RICO claims were arbitrable. On remand, the case remained unresolved for another three years. The district judge fined the McMahons' counsel for filing frivolous motions, sanctions which were reversed on appeal, setting another precedent.

McMahon greatly expanded the use of arbitration in securities disputes, since many of them take place under the 1934 Act, which regulates the secondary market in which most investors trade. It also signaled a greater acceptance of arbitration as a desirable and fair method of dispute resolution. This was cited by the Court three years later in Rodriguez de Quijas v. Shearson/American Express Inc., when it overturned Wilko completely and held that claims under the 1933 Act could also be arbitrated if the parties had clearly chosen to do so. The expansion in securities arbitration as a result led to reforms during the 1990s to make the process more investor-friendly.

== Underlying dispute ==
In 1979, Eugene and Julia McMahon, who owned two funeral homes in Yonkers, New York, became friendly with Walter and Mary Ann McNulty, fellow parishioners at their church. Mrs. McNulty, a broker with what was then Shearson/American Express, persuaded Mrs. McMahon to invest not only their personal savings but also their employee's retirement and profit sharing funds with her company. Two years later, McNulty persuaded the McMahons to sign power of attorney forms allowing Shearson to make trades without their consent. Those standard form contracts contained an arbitration clause committing either party to use that method of resolving disputes.

By that time, they had invested over a half a million dollars with Shearson. The McMahons claimed that after they signed the power of attorney forms, McNulty began trading at a faster pace. The account statements they received in the mail showed at least three trades a day, sometimes as many as 50 a week. Most were in high-risk options, and the McMahons said they did not have sufficient financial sophistication to make sense of what was occurring. Eugene McMahon says his accountants could not, either.

However, they were able to see that their account was showing losses. McNulty reassured them, but their misgivings increased. When they closed the account early in 1983, it was nearly empty. Their trading losses reached $350,000 ($1,131,000 in modern dollars) and commissions accounted for the rest.

Relations between the two couples collapsed. Mrs. McNulty filed a defamation lawsuit against Eugene McMahon alleging he had promised to destroy her reputation in revenge. In late 1984, the McMahons sued Shearson and McNulty in federal court for the Southern District of New York alleging the defendants had churned their account, or traded simply to generate commissions. They claimed violations of the regulations of the Securities and Exchange Commission (SEC) based on the Securities Exchange Act of 1934, often referred to as "the 1934 Act" by securities lawyers, and violations of the more recent Racketeer Influenced and Corrupt Organizations Act (RICO), along with violations of corresponding New York state laws. In addition to being reimbursed for their losses they sought $5 million in punitive damages.

=== Arbitration vs. litigation ===
The McMahons' suit was one of a rising number filed against brokers by disgruntled investors during a bull market. Many brokers felt, as McNulty and Shearson did about the McMahons, that clients expected ever-increasing returns and did not understand that these were just ordinary, unavoidable market losses. "The brokerage relationship is not a guarantee relationship or an insurance relationship," said Edward O'Brien, president of the Securities Industry Association. "You're not supposed to simply turn things over to someone else." They wanted arbitration clauses to be enforced so that they would spend less time and money defending lawsuits.

Juries, the brokerages felt, could not understand the complexities of securities trading and law as well as arbitrators with experience in the industry. They saw arbitration as cheaper, faster yet still fair. "[T]he industry person is often likely to bend over backward in favor of the customer," said Edward Morris, director of arbitration for the New York Stock Exchange. More than half the time, the industry said, arbitration panels ruled in the customer's favor.

Investors and their lawyers did not agree. "The houses basically like the present system because they own the stacked deck", said Sheldon Elsen, director of the American Bar Association's securities arbitration task force. "I would rather defend a capitalist before the comrades' court than a client before an arbitration panel of the New York Stock Exchange," said a Los Angeles lawyer who had, with his client, walked out of a hearing because of the conflicts of interest they believed panelists had.

They said the investors' victory rate was misleading as a measure of arbitration's effectiveness since they often merely reimbursed investors for their losses, most of which then went to pay legal bills, and did not include punitive damages such as a court might award that could deter future misconduct. Nor did investors arbitrating claims have access to the full range of procedures they would in court. They could not force the brokerage to produce evidence, and they often charged that the brokerages falsified or improperly withheld documents. Arbitrators also did not have to provide a written explanation for their decisions.

=== Applicability of Wilko to 1934 Act claims ===
In 1950, when a brokerage firm had tried to compel arbitration with an investor alleging his broker left him holding the bag in a pump and dump scheme, the case had gone all the way to the Supreme Court. In 1953 it had held in Wilko v. Swan that three provisions of the Securities Act of 1933 (or, the 1933 Act), which regulates the primary market in which securities issuers sell directly to buyers, were controlling, allowing investors to take their claims to court regardless of what contracts and the Federal Arbitration Act (FAA) said. It found that the language in the 1933 Act voiding any waiver of any provision of the statute was broad enough to cover arbitration clauses, and deduced congressional preference for the courts in language that allowed a special cause of action where the burden of proof was on the seller of the security to show that they were unaware of the dubious nature of the security sold, and allowed buyers to sue in any state or federal court of competent jurisdiction.

Lower courts, when faced with similar attempts to force arbitration in claims under the 1934 Act, which regulates the secondary market where previously sold securities are resold and the vast majority of trades take place, held that Wilko applied to it as well since the language of the latter statute was similar. Several appellate circuits upheld this interpretation and it was never considered by the Supreme Court, until 1974. That year, in Scherk v. Alberto-Culver Co., a German company had sought to compel arbitration in a dispute with an Illinois company alleging it had misrepresented several trademarks prior to the sale.

Wilko had been part of the respondent's argument against arbitration, since the deal had also included some stock. During his majority opinion holding for the petitioner, Justice Potter Stewart noted that "a colorable argument could be made" that Wilko did not reach the 1934 Act due to differences in the corresponding sections of the statutes. The non-waiver provision was narrower, the private right of action only implied, and the 1934 Act only provided for federal jurisdiction. Stewart found those concerns irrelevant to the case, since it concerned an international transaction under which arbitration might be a better solution.

The question had not been before the Court in Dean Witter Reynolds Inc. v. Byrd, the next time the Court had considered arbitration in a securities dispute, decided as the McMahons were filing their lawsuit. But Justice Byron White, who had joined William O. Douglas's Scherk dissent (which had not considered the "colorable argument") had devoted a short concurrence with the unanimous opinion to noting that it was still an open question. In the wake of the decision, many district court judges, and some on the appellate circuits, began following his analysis.

== In lower courts ==
Before trial began, Shearson filed for a motion to compel arbitration per the contract. District Judge Lloyd MacMahon granted it, citing the Supreme Court's recent holding in Byrd. Since it went against Second Circuit precedent, the order to arbitrate the 1934 Act claims was reversed on appeal by a panel from the circuit, while the order to arbitrate the RICO claims was affirmed.

=== District court ===
To counter the defense motion to compel arbitration, the McMahons relied on Wilko. In that 1953 case, the Supreme Court had held that the provisions of the Securities Act of 1933 invalidating any contractual requirement that a securities buyer waive rights under the statute, allowing for a special right to recover for misrepresentation and granting jurisdiction to all state and federal courts created an exception to the Federal Arbitration Act (FAA), which says that an arbitration clause "shall be valid, irrevocable, and enforceable, save upon such grounds as exist at law or in equity for the revocation of any contract". More specifically to the case, they argued that fraud was not arbitrable under the language of the arbitration clause, that their agreement with Shearson was an unenforceable adhesion contract and that McNulty's action in state court voided the arbitration clause.

MacMahon found their arguments "wholly unconvincing." There was no evidence of fraud in the inducement of the contract, and even if there had been the Prima Paint separability rule required that the arbitrator decide that question unless the fraud claim was specific to the arbitration clause itself, which was not the case in the McMahons' suit. Fraud was also well within the scope of the arbitration clause, he wrote. Nor did the state action waive the arbitration clause since it largely concerned different issues and "that proceeding has no bearing on this action and certainly no effect on plaintiffs' agreement to arbitrate".

The applicability of the Wilko doctrine to 1934 Act claims, the judge wrote, "merits some discussion". Allegaert v. Perot had set precedent within the Second Circuit eight years earlier by making explicit what had long been taken as settled law in all federal courts. He further distinguished Allegaert from the instant case by noting that Allegaert had involved industrywide allegations of massive fraud, and thus there was a public policy reason to prefer litigation, whereas McMahon was between one brokerage firm and one client. Combined with the Court's declaration two years earlier in Moses H. Cone Memorial Hospital v. Mercury Constr. Corp. that the FAA enacted "a liberal federal policy favoring arbitration agreements, notwithstanding any state substantive or procedural policies to the contrary," MacMahon followed the lead of district courts in other circuits and ordered the parties to arbitrate per their contract. He further held that the RICO claims were non-arbitrable, but stayed them pending the outcome of arbitration. Following Byrd, he also required arbitration of the McMahons' claims under state law.

=== Appeals court ===
Both parties appealed to the Second Circuit. The McMahons sought to reverse the order to arbitrate the 1934 Act claims, and Shearson sought to have the RICO claims arbitrated as well. In early 1986 a panel composed of the circuit's then-chief judge, Wilfred Feinberg, Jon O. Newman, and William Homer Timbers heard oral arguments. They held for the McMahons on both issues, reversing Judge MacMahon on the arbitration order and thus ordering that the RICO claims proceed since there was no longer any reason to stay them.

Writing for the panel, Timbers called MacMahon's holding that the 1934 Act claims were arbitrable "an unwarranted departure from the settled law of this Circuit" and reviewed Allegaert and the other cases that had established that.

He reiterated that they expressed a belief that litigation better protected investors' rights, and only in cases of disputes between member firms of the exchanges had the Circuit allowed arbitration to proceed.[16]

Shearson had asked the court to overrule those precedents in its briefs and arguments, citing White's Byrd concurrence, but Timbers demurred. While he allowed that the Supreme Court might accept that argument, "it would be improvident for us to disregard clear judicial precedent in this Circuit based on mere speculation," he wrote. "We think that the orderly administration of justice will be best served if we as one of the inferior courts follow Supreme Court precedent and adhere to the settled law of this Circuit, and a fortiori the district courts should do likewise." At the end of his opinion he said in a footnote that it would have been easier to decide the issue if the Securities and Exchange Commission (SEC) had submitted an amicus curiae brief giving its perspective on arbitration.

The RICO claims were likewise non-arbitrable, Timbers held. He cited two reasons. First was the public-policy doctrine he had invoked earlier, adding that circuit precedent held claims under the Sherman Antitrust Act non-arbitrable because that statute was "designed to promote the national interest in a competitive economy." He distinguished it from Mitsubishi Motors Corp. v. Soler Chrysler-Plymouth, Inc. the previous year, where the Supreme Court had ordered arbitration of Sherman Act claims, because that case involved international litigants and arbitration was a more efficient way of resolving disputes across borders. Also, since RICO was fairly new legislation, it was important that it be interpreted and applied in a public judicial forum, where legal precedents could be set and appealed.

On one final issue the panel affirmed MacMahon. Citing Byrd, it held that the state-law claims were arbitrable even if it bifurcated the proceedings. In a footnote, Timbers suggested that the McMahons might consider withdrawing their state-law claim in the interest of efficiency.

== Supreme Court ==
Shearson appealed to the Supreme Court, and certiorari was granted before the end of the year. The Court heard oral arguments in March 1987. Theodore Krebsbach appeared for Shearson, joined by Richard Taranto from the Solicitor General's office, urging reversal on behalf of the federal government. The McMahons were represented by Theodore Eppenstain, who with his wife and partner Madelaine had been highly visible in the media on their behalf.

While the case was pending, the SEC filed an amicus brief softening previous concerns it had expressed about arbitration and saying those procedures had improved since Wilko. Two amici briefs were filed urging affirmance. Amici urging reversal were filed by 20 different brokerage firms.

=== Decision ===
Near the end of its term, in June 1987, the Court announced its decision. By a 5–4 margin it ruled for Shearson, holding that Wilko did not cover claims under the 1934 Act and that the RICO claims, too, were to be arbitrated. Sandra Day O'Connor wrote for the majority. Harry Blackmun wrote an opinion that concurred with the RICO holding but dissented from the 1934 Act holding, joined by William Brennan and Thurgood Marshall, who had written for the Court in Byrd. John Paul Stevens wrote a separate opinion along the same lines.

==== Majority ====
After recounting the history of the case, O'Connor set forth the Court's reasoning. The nonwaiver language in the 1933 Act had forbidden the waiver of "any provision" of the statute, whereas the 1934 Act only prohibited waiver of "compliance with any provision". Since the federal court jurisdiction granted elsewhere in the 1934 Act, another of the three foundations of the McMahons' argument, was not a duty with which investors and brokers had to comply, it was not affected by the nonwaiver provision.

Wilko's holding that the right to litigate could not be waived, O'Connor continued, "can only be understood in the context of the Court's ensuing discussion explaining why arbitration was inadequate as a means of enforcing 'the provisions of the Securities Act, advantageous to the buyer' ... The conclusion in Wilko was expressly based on the Court's belief that a judicial forum was needed to protect the substantive rights created by the Securities Act." The Court's pro-arbitration holding in Scherk, she wrote, "supports our understanding that Wilko must be read as barring waiver of a judicial forum only where arbitration is inadequate to protect the substantive rights at issue."

O'Connor rejected as well the McMahons' contention that the involuntary, adhesive nature of the arbitration agreement made it unenforceable, since that was not relevant to the statute. In rejecting the McMahons' next argument, that arbitration would not sufficiently protect their rights, she conceded that that concern had been central to the Court's holding in Wilko. But, she noted, Justice Felix Frankfurter's dissent had criticized the majority for so holding without any facts in the record supporting that conclusion. More recent decisions of both the Supreme Court and lower courts had indicated a growing acceptance of arbitration and improved procedural safeguards, especially as mandated by the SEC. "[T]he mistrust of arbitration that formed the basis for the Wilko opinion in 1953 is difficult to square with the assessment of arbitration that has prevailed since that time," she concluded.

The last argument she considered was that Congress had intended the 1934 Act to be interpreted consistently with Wilko. An extensive overhaul of the 1934 Act passed in 1975, the McMahons claimed, included the language "Nothing in this chapter shall be construed to modify existing law" and in any event did not change the relevant language. They pointed to a conference committee report on that section stating that "it was the clear understanding of the conferees that this amendment did not change existing law, as articulated in Wilko v. Swan."

"We find this argument fraught with difficulties." O'Connor responded. "We cannot see how Congress could extend Wilko to the Exchange Act without enacting into law any provision remotely addressing that subject." The passage and amendment discussed in the conference report were specifically intended to assure that the self-regulatory organizations of the securities industry, such as the exchanges and what was then the National Association of Securities Dealers, had legal authority to enforce disciplinary rulings against their members made by their own arbitration panels. In fact, she proposed, Congress may well have been aware of the Scherk ruling the year before and avoided the issue specifically with the intent of leaving it to the courts.

O'Connor then considered the RICO claims. "Unlike the Exchange Act, there is nothing in the text of the RICO statute that even arguably evinces congressional intent to exclude civil RICO claims from the dictates of the Arbitration Act," she observed. "This silence in the text is matched by silence in the statute's legislative history." Because of this, the McMahons would have had to show "an irreconcilable conflict between arbitration and RICO's underlying purposes." To this end, it was suggested that the case was too complex for arbitration or, as the Second Circuit had, that there were public policy considerations behind the statute.

Many of those arguments had already been addressed by the Court in Mitsubishi Motors the previous year. There, O'Connor noted, the Court had enforced an arbitration agreement in an international transaction regarding antitrust claims. If those were not too complex to be arbitrated, securities claims were not, either.

The McMahons further contended that the overlapping civil and criminal provisions in RICO rendered that statute unarbitrable. O'Connor disagreed, noting that most RICO civil cases were not being brought against genuinely criminal organizations but legitimate businesses.

The special incentives necessary to encourage civil enforcement actions against organized crime do not support nonarbitrability of run-of-the-mill civil RICO claims brought against legitimate enterprises. The private attorney general role for the typical RICO plaintiff is simply less plausible than it is for the typical antitrust plaintiff.

"The McMahons," she concluded, "'having made the bargain to arbitrate,' will be held to their bargain."

==== Dissents ====
Blackmun concurred with the majority on the RICO issue. He devoted the rest of his lengthy dissent to a detailed criticism of the majority. By deferring to the SEC's change of position on the effectiveness of arbitration, he charged, "the Court effectively overrules Wilko ... [approving] the abandonment of the judiciary's role in the resolution of claims under the Exchange Act, and leave[ing] such claims to the arbitral forum of the securities industry at a time when the industry's abuses towards investors are more apparent than ever."

"At the outset", he wrote, "it is useful to review the manner by which the issue decided today has been kept alive inappropriately by this Court." He relegated his discussion of and response to Stewart's "colorable argument" to his footnotes since the majority had not, he claimed, relied on it and in any event "[i]t simply constituted a way of keeping the issue of the arbitrability of [1934 Act] claims alive for those opposed to the result in Wilko." Of greater relevance was Congress's refusal to address Wilko during the process of drafting and passing the 1975 amendments. "One would have thought that, after these amendments, the matter of Wilko's extension to Exchange Act claims at last would be uncontroversial," he wrote. "Yet, like a ghost reluctant to accept its eternal rest, the 'colorable argument' surfaced again" in White's Byrd concurrence.

He focused his criticism on the Court's reading of Wilko:

There are essentially two problems with the Court's conclusion that predispute agreements to arbitrate [1934 Act] claims may be enforced. First, the Court gives Wilko an overly narrow reading so that it can fit into the syllogism offered by the [SEC] and accepted by the Court, namely, (1) Wilko was really a case concerning whether arbitration was adequate for the enforcement of the substantive provisions of the securities laws; (2) all of the Wilko Court's doubts as to arbitration's adequacy are outdated; (3) thus Wilko is no longer good law ... Second, the Court accepts uncritically petitioners' and the [SEC]'s argument that the problems with arbitration, highlighted by the Wilko Court, either no longer exist or are not now viewed as problems by the Court.

Blackmun agreed with the majority that a possible exemption to the FAA must be supported by a finding of Congressional intent. "Where the Court first goes wrong, however, is in its failure to acknowledge that the Exchange Act, like the Securities Act, constitutes such an exception," he wrote. "This failure is made possible only by the unduly narrow reading of Wilko that ignores the Court's determination there that the Securities Act was an exception to the Arbitration Act." He found this particularly surprising given that it had relied on Wilko in Mitsubishi Motors to support exactly the same conclusion.

Even absent that recent reaffirmance, Wilko would have made the same point on its own. "The Court's misreading is possible because, while extolling the policies of the Arbitration Act, it is insensitive to, and disregards the policies of, the Securities Act." Blackmun reminded his colleagues that it was passed eight years after the FAA specifically meant to protect investors in the wake of abuses uncovered after the 1929 stock market crash that, many believed at the time, had brought on the Great Depression. Its primary policy goal had been investor protection. "Accordingly, the Court seriously errs when it states that the result in Wilko turned only on the perceived inadequacy of arbitration for the enforcement of [1933 Act] claims" since that had been preceded by a lengthy reiteration of the purposes of the statute, which then led to whether mandatory arbitration served those purposes. Nor had Scherk led to a re-examination of the question as the majority had suggested, since the case was distinguished from Wilko by its international nature, a special circumstance.

"In light of a proper reading of Wilko," Blackmun wrote, "the pertinent question then becomes whether the language, legislative history, and purposes of the Exchange Act call for an exception to the Arbitration Act for ... claims [under the former]." While the 1933 and 1934 Acts governed different markets, they shared investor protection as a common goal, as the Court itself had recognized in Ernst & Ernst v. Hochfelder and held even more recently was to be promoted to the maximum extent possible. "It is clear that Wilko, when properly read, governs the instant case and mandates that a pre-dispute arbitration agreement should not be enforced as to [1934 Act] claims."

And even if the effectiveness of arbitration had been the central issue in Wilko, Blackmun continued, the goal of investor protection still required that holding. "Despite improvements in the process of arbitration and changes in the judicial attitude towards it, several aspects of arbitration that were seen by the Wilko court to be inimical to the policy of investor protection still remain. Moreover, I have serious reservations about the [SEC]'s contention that its oversight of the SROs' arbitration procedures will ensure that the process is adequate to protect an investor's rights under the securities Acts."

In Wilko, the court had noted that arbitrators were not required to explain their decisions nor keep a complete written record. Further, the FAA gave only four grounds under which judges could vacate an arbitrator's award (fraud in procuring the award, partiality or gross misconduct by arbitrators, and arbitrators' failure to make a final decision). Judges could only consider "manifest disregard" for the law in their review of arbitrators' handling of the case.

Blackmun conceded that arbitration procedures had improved since then, citing specifically the SEC's development of code governing the process, with industry and public input. But "[e]ven those who favor the arbitration of securities claims do not contend, however, that arbitration has changed so significantly as to eliminate the essential characteristics noted by the Wilko Court," he wrote. "Indeed, proponents of arbitration would not see these characteristics as 'problems,' because, in their view, the characteristics permit the unique 'streamlined' nature of the arbitral process." Arbitrators were still not required to keep records or follow legal precedent, and were discouraged from explaining their decisions. Nor had the scope of judicial review of arbitral awards been expanded since Wilko, he observed.

More than any procedural improvements in arbitration, Blackmun continued, it was "the Court's present assumption that the distinctive features of arbitration, its more quick and economical resolution of claims, do not render it inherently inadequate for the resolution of statutory claims" that was spurring an increased acceptance of the process. "Such reasoning, however, should prevail only in the absence of the congressional policy that places the statutory claimant in a special position with respect to possible violators of his statutory rights." He did not see that reflected in the current securities-industry arbitration procedures, in which at best the two parties were on equal footing. At worst, which he felt to be more frequently the case, the brokerages had the upper hand:

The Uniform Code provides some safeguards, but, despite them, and indeed because of the background of the arbitrators, the investor has the impression, frequently justified, that his claims are being judged by a forum composed of individuals sympathetic to the securities industry, and not drawn from the public. It is generally recognized that the codes do not define who falls into the category "not from the securities industry." ... Accordingly, it is often possible for the "public" arbitrators to be attorneys or consultants whose clients have been exchange members or SROs ... The uniform opposition of investors to compelled arbitration and the overwhelming support of the securities industry for the process suggest that there must be some truth to the investors' belief that the securities industry has an advantage in a forum under its own control.

Blackmun was incredulous that the majority gave such great weight to the SEC's change of position, without noting that it was a change, and a very recent one at that. The agency's current power, he wrote, would not be enough to adequately regulate arbitration. "It is most questionable, then, whether the Commission's recently adopted position is entitled to the deference that the Court accords it."

Even after the 1975 amendments that had reassured the majority as to the SEC's ability to properly oversee arbitration, Blackmun noted, it had continued to express a negative view of the process. At one point it proposed a rule prohibiting mandatory arbitration. Its own description of its powers over arbitration belied the majority's faith in the agency, he wrote.

"[T]he Court's complacent acceptance of the Commission's oversight is alarming when almost every day brings another example of illegality on Wall Street," wrote Blackmun. While many of those examples, he conceded, did not involve arbitrable disputes between brokers and clients such as the McMahons,

... [t]hey, however, do suggest that the industry's self-regulation, of which the SRO arbitration is a part, is not functioning acceptably. Moreover, these abuses have highlighted the difficulty experienced by the Commission, at a time of growth in the securities market and a decrease in the Commission's staff, to carry out its oversight task. Such inadequacies on the part of the Commission strike at the very heart of the reasoning of the Court, which is content to accept the soothing assurances of the Commission without examining the reality behind them. Indeed, while the amici cite the number of arbitrations of securities disputes as a sign of the success of this process in the industry, these statistics have a more portentous meaning. In this era of deregulation, the growth in complaints about the securities industry, many of which find their way to arbitration, parallels the increase in securities violations and suggests a market not adequately controlled by the SROs ... In such a time, one would expect more, not less, judicial involvement in resolution of securities disputes.

In the last section of his dissent Blackmun found some prospect for relief. Rep. John Dingell of Michigan, then chair of the House Subcommittee on Oversight and Investigations, had had similar concerns and was surprised to hear the SEC take the opposite position in its amicus brief from what its representatives had consistently told his subcommittee. He advised lower courts to "take seriously their duty to review the results of arbitration to the extent possible under the Arbitration Act." In fact, he concluded, he foresaw more investors bringing such complaints to their attention. "It is thus ironic that the Court's decision, no doubt animated by its desire to rid the federal courts of these suits, actually may increase litigation about arbitration."

Stevens' short dissent reminded his colleagues that "after a statute has been construed, either by this Court or by a consistent course of decision by other federal judges and agencies, it acquires a meaning that should be as clear as if the judicial gloss had been drafted by the Congress itself." That was what the Court had done in Wilko, and eight circuits had held that case applicable to the 1934 Act. "This longstanding interpretation creates a strong presumption, in my view, that any mistake that the courts may have made in interpreting the statute is best remedied by the legislative, not the judicial, branch." He, too, concurred with the majority and Blackmun in regard to the RICO claims' arbitrability.

== Subsequent proceedings ==
The case was remanded to the Second Circuit and then back to district court, where it was assumed to have been disposed through arbitration. However, procedural disputes stalled resolution of the case for two years, requiring another hearing before Judge MacMahon. Sanctions imposed against Eppenstein were reversed on appeal.

=== District court sanctions plaintiffs' counsel ===
In a 1988 status conference, it surfaced in that the parties had not resolved a disagreement about whether a separate court order was necessary for the arbitration to commence. MacMahon issued a stipulation to that effect, but the parties were back before him a month later. It turned out that the order had not specified the forum under which the arbitration was to take place. While the original contract had specified the NYSE, the McMahons responded to the order with a motion in state court to enjoin the arbitration and instead allow them to arbitrate the case before the American Arbitration Association (AAA), per the rules of the American Stock Exchange, instead.

The McMahons offered three reasons why the original notice of intent to arbitrate was not valid. First, the original litigation was still pending in 1985 when it had been issued; second, the notice was defective under the New York State Civil Practice Law and Rules and finally that the court's recent stipulation allowed the plaintiff to choose their forum. MacMahon prefaced his discussion with a quote from O'Connor's opinion in the case, bolstering his reminder that "arbitration is strictly a creature of contract ... The method agreed upon by the parties for naming an arbitrator is explicit and unambiguous and therefore must be given controlling effect."

Turning to the plaintiffs' arguments, he wrote, "these contentions are frivolous, and flaunt the agreement, the Arbitration Act, and the mandate of the Supreme Court." The 1985 notice was proper because according to the agreement the requirement to arbitrate was triggered by the mere occurrence of a controversy, not any formal proceedings. "The pendency of an action does not stay arbitration, but instead forces a demand and application by defendants to compel arbitration and to stay the trial pending arbitration ... Plaintiffs' imposition of such a condition without an order staying the arbitration and preserving the exercise of the right to select an arbitrator, was simply a unilateral, futile, and legally unjustifiable attempt to change the terms of the agreement."

Had a stay been in effect, he suggested, the first argument might have been legitimate. But it wasn't, and MacMahon cited Eppenstein's letter responding to the arbitration notice as indicated his own awareness of this requirement. The attorney had apparently believed he would prevail in court. "His mistaken prediction, however well founded, was not a preservation of plaintiffs' right to choose the forum." MacMahon wrote. "On the contrary, his reliance on his own misjudgment was a voluntary and knowing waiver of plaintiffs' right to choose the forum under both federal and state law."

Nor had the notice failed to comply with the state statutes. It had the address of the defendants and their attorney, a statement of what was to be arbitrated and why, and notice that the plaintiffs had 20 days to seek a stay or they would lose all right to challenge the arbitrability of the dispute. MacMahon found that all these elements were present.

MacMahon reserved his greatest scorn for the last argument, where he expressed his opinion that Eppenstein had deliberately misinterpreted his order to delay proceedings. "There is nothing on the face of the stipulated order naming an arbitration forum different from the one already named by defendants in accordance with the agreement", he observed. "All it did was order plaintiffs to commence arbitration, something they already had been ordered to do." While Shearson's attorneys had argued against issuing the order, they had not formally objected to it, he noted.

At best, he continued, Eppenstein had been in error in maintaining that arbitration proceedings were stayed absent a final order by the court to that effect. When MacMahon had signed the initial stipulation he had not been aware the forum-selection issue had not been resolved. Eppenstain's subsequent actions made it clear to MacMahon that the lawyer was aware of that. "The action of plaintiffs' counsel was a blatant evasion of our ongoing jurisdiction and a misleading interpretation of the order," MacMahon wrote.

He once again ordered arbitration, issued a permanent injunction against any further state-court proceedings, and sharply criticized Eppenstein.

The conduct of plaintiffs' counsel in misinterpreting the order has caused delay, unfounded harassment, and unnecessary expense to defendants. It has also unjustly deprived defendants of their right to a swift resolution of the serious and damaging charges plaintiffs have levelled against them, defeating the essential purpose of both the agreement and the Arbitration Act. Counsel's actions also have delayed a swift resolution of plaintiffs' underlying claims and increased their expense. In short, counsel's tactics have unreasonably, vexatiously, and frivolously multiplied these proceedings ... In addition, plaintiffs' counsel has had the temerity to represent to this court that the October 11 order gives plaintiffs the right to select the arbitration forum, and has included with his affidavit his misrepresentations to state court, the NYSE, and the AAA ...

MacMahon fined Eppenstein personally $1,000 for filing frivolous and vexatious papers under Federal Rule of Civil Procedure 11 and Title 28, Section 1927 of federal law.

McMahon v. Shearson/American Express Inc.
- Court: United States Court of Appeals for the Second Circuit
- Full case name: See above
- Argued: October 11 1989
- Decided: February 14 1990
- Citation: 896 F.2d 17

Case history
- Prior history: Plaintiffs' counsel sanctioned, 709 F. Supp. 369 (S.D.N.Y. 1989)

Holding
- Counsel was improperly sanctioned under Rule 11 for filing action in state court to enjoin arbitration commenced by opposing party when court had declined opportunity to order specific arbitral forum, filings that use exact language of order cannot be construed as misrepresenting order and rule does not apply to filings in state court. Southern District of New York reversed and vacated.

Court membership
- Judges sitting: Richard J. Cardamone, Wilfred Feinberg and Charles Miller Metzner

Case opinions
- Majority: Cardamone

Laws applied
- Federal Rules of Civil Procedure

=== Sanctions overturned on appeal ===
Eppenstein appealed, and a year after MacMahon's original stipulation, the Second Circuit heard the case. It reversed the sanctions.

Richard J. Cardamone, writing for a three-judge panel, reviewed the case. He noted that MacMahon had been asked to resolve the forum issue at the status conference, but had instead asked the parties to work out an order for him to sign. They did, but while the issue was still pending, Shearson had started arbitration. Eppenstein was therefore, he wrote, forced to seek resolution of the issue in state court because MacMahon had refused to make a ruling. When Shearson responded by filing for an order to show cause in district court, Eppenstein agreed to postpone the state-court action.

Second Circuit precedent allowed (as opposed to some other circuits), three different standards by which to review Rule 11 sanctions. A claim that there was no legal basis for the action called for de novo review, and the panel proceeded from there. "The Rule does not license a district court to sanction any action by an attorney or party that it disapproves of," Cardamone noted.

Eppenstein, they found, had not misinterpreted the stipulation, since it had only directed "the commencement by plaintiffs of an arbitration." His affidavit to the state court had quoted this explicitly, and included it as an attached exhibit. "It is difficult to understand how appellant's three-page [affidavit] can be deemed a 'misrepresentation' when it uses the exact language of the district court's order," Cardamone wrote. Eppenstein, in fact, could hardly be blamed for interpreting the terse command any other way. "Given that the district court refused to provide any guidance as to the arbitral forum, Eppenstein was justified in interpreting the order to give his client the right of election ... Rule 11 is not intended to chill an attorney's creative, imaginative or enthusiastic advocacy on his client's behalf." Further, it only covered papers filed in federal court, so any of Eppenstein's state-court pleadings were beyond its scope.

Cardamone next turned to the statutory justification for the proceedings, asking whether it could be considered a vexatious attempt to multiply proceedings. He reiterated his earlier findings, adding to the record his observation that Shearson's attorney had also told MacMahon in writing that the judge had never considered the issue of the proper forum. In fact, he suggested, it was Shearson who had engaged in underhanded behavior:

Shearson's counsel, after agreeing to the form of an order to be submitted to the court directing plaintiffs to commence the arbitration, thereafter attempted to nullify plaintiffs' right of election by commencing arbitration himself in a different forum. Examining appellant's alternatives for preserving his clients' right to choose a forum, we conclude that his choices were limited. One was a return to federal court—where the judge had already refused to rule. Another was to seek relief from state court, pursuant to a New York statute governing arbitration ... Appellant chose the latter course of action. [It] was perhaps unorthodox, but under the circumstances we do not think it may be characterized either as subterfuge or an attempt to evade the jurisdiction of the federal court. While the state court proceeding necessarily forced the opposing party to expend time, effort and money, that factor alone certainly cannot make it sanctionable so long as it was a good faith attempt to preserve what counsel believed to be his clients' right to choose an arbitral forum. Any action taken on behalf of one's client during litigation generally causes an opposing party to expend time and money ... Moreover, it may fairly be said that Shearson's actions—more than appellants—unreasonably and vexatiously multiplied these proceedings. Shearson, after all, commenced arbitration contrary to the terms of the court order it had agreed upon.

Shearson had also moved for Eppenstein to be sanctioned for filing the appeal of his sanctions in the first place. "The outcome of this appeal refutes appellees' argument" Cardamone responded. He concluded by chastising Shearson for making that argument: "[A] motion for sanctions ... should not be a reflex response when served with an appellant's brief." he wrote. "The request in the instant appeal is particularly inappropriate because, as noted, appellees' actions vexatiously multiplied the proceedings at the trial level ... [I]n this case, counsel revealed a woeful lack of understanding of the increased personal responsibility imposed upon each individual attorney under these salutary rules".

== Subsequent jurisprudence ==
In the wake of McMahon, an unusual duality persisted. Investors bringing claims under the 1934 Act could be forced into arbitration, but not those with claims under the 1933 Act, since Wilko still applied. Commentators wondered if the Court would uphold that case, especially given its change of heart over arbitration.

"The Supreme Court in McMahon has cast serious doubt on the continuing viability of Wilko, even with respect to Securities Act claims", wrote Lori Stewart Blea, a Pace law student. "Therefore, it seems highly likely that, when provided the opportunity, the Court will hold all securities claims to be subject to pre-dispute arbitration agreements." Brigham Young law student Craig L. Griffin suggested that Wilko had effectively been overruled already: "The Court in McMahon attempted to distinguish its earlier holding by showing that Wilko was based on erroneous assumptions. Rather than distinguishing McMahon, this portion of the Court's opinion appears to impliclitly overrule Wilko," he wrote. "In sum, McMahon cannot really be reconciled with Wilko." An article in the University of Miami Law Review on the subject was subtitled "Wilko's Swan Song".

=== Rodriguez de Quijas v. Shearson/American Express Inc. ===
The case that would bring that question before the Court directly was not long in coming. Within a few months of McMahon a California district judge held that it "so seriously undermined Wilko's rationale" as to require him to order arbitration of 1933 Act claims. Others soon followed.

Pessimism about Wilko's future was shared by at least one circuit judge. As district courts were ordering 1933 Act claims arbitrated in spite of it, the Fifth Circuit reconsidered Noble v. Dexel Burnham Lambert in light of McMahon, which had been decided in the interim. Thomas Gibbs Gee noted that "McMahon undercuts every aspect of [Wilko]; a formal overruling of Wilko appears inevitable—or, perhaps, superfluous."

Gee's colleagues got the chance to test that assumption within a year. Several cases brought by investors from Brownsville, Texas, also Shearson clients, who claimed to have lost almost half a million dollars in fraudulent or malfeasant trades were combined under Rodriguez de Quijas v. Shearson/American Express Inc., filed suit under both acts. The district court had followed McMahon and ordered arbitration of the 1934 Act claims but not those under the 1933 Act. Shearson appealed, claiming Wilko had effectively been overruled by that decision, and a three-judge panel heard the case in the middle of 1988.

"As McMahon makes clear, the Supreme Court no longer considers arbitration inadequate to protect substantive rights," Judge Jerre Stockton Williams wrote for the panel. As Justice Blackmun had in his McMahon dissent, the plaintiffs pointed to Congress's apparent intent to leave Wilko undisturbed in its otherwise extensive 1975 amendments to the Acts. writing for the court, was unpersuaded. "We find it implausible that Congress intended to prohibit arbitration of Securities Act claims but intended to allow courts to determine the arbitrability of Exchange Act claims."

Following circuit precedent, he held that the similarities between the two Acts were more significant than the differences and that on this issue they should be interpreted similarly because of McMahon: "The Supreme Court opinion in McMahon, which binds us here, turns solely on the adequacy of arbitration to resolve securities disputes. It does not distinguish between the Exchange Act and the Securities Act." That holding, and the circuit's own Noble case the year before "lead directly to the obsolescence of Wilko and the arbitrability of Securities Act § 12(2) claims."

The plaintiffs appealed to the Supreme Court, and certiorari was granted later that year. Following a timetable similar to that of McMahon, the Court heard arguments in March 1988 and issued its decision in May. By a 5–4 margin, it overturned Wilko.

Justice Anthony Kennedy wrote for the majority, the same five justices who had formed the corresponding bloc in McMahon. He reiterated that Court's finding that arbitral procedures had improved sufficiently that judicial skepticism was no longer warranted. "To the extent that Wilko rested on suspicion of arbitration as a method of weakening the protections afforded in the substantive law to would-be complainants, it has fallen far out of step with our current strong endorsement of the federal statutes favoring this method of resolving disputes," he wrote. "Once the outmoded presumption of disfavoring arbitration proceedings is set to one side, it becomes clear that the right to select the judicial forum and the wider choice of courts are not such essential features of the Securities Act that § 14 is properly construed to bar any waiver of these provisions. Nor are they so critical that they cannot be waived under the rationale that the Securities Act was intended to place buyers of securities on an equal footing with sellers."

Kennedy argued that the language of the 1933 Act offered "no sound basis" for holding that the non-waiver provision reached pre-dispute arbitration clauses. Since it allowed investors to file cases in state court without the possibility of removal to federal court and whatever additional procedural protections that venue would offer, it could not have been Congress's intent to have held investors to the statute's procedural provisions against their interests. In McMahon and Mitsubishi Motors, the Court had also held that similar language did not bar arbitration of claims.

The Fifth Circuit came in for some criticism:

We do not suggest that the Court of Appeals, on its own authority, should have taken the step of renouncing Wilko. If a precedent of this Court has direct application in a case, yet appears to rest on reasons rejected in some other line of decisions, the Court of Appeals should follow the case which directly controls, leaving to this Court the prerogative of overruling its own decisions.

Kennedy then declared that Wilko was "incorrectly decided, and is inconsistent with the prevailing uniform construction of other federal statutes governing arbitration agreements in the setting of business transactions." The Court took this drastic step, he explained, not only to correct its earlier error but to harmonize the interpretation of both Acts, which it had recognized as "interrelated components of the federal regulatory scheme governing transactions in securities" in Ernst & Ernst v. Hochfelder.

In this case, for example, petitioners' claims under the 1934 Act were subjected to arbitration, while their claim under the 1933 Act was not permitted to go to arbitration, but was required to proceed in court. That result makes little sense for similar claims, based on similar facts, which are supposed to arise within a single federal regulatory scheme. In addition, the inconsistency between Wilko and McMahon undermines the essential rationale for a harmonious construction of the two statutes, which is to discourage litigants from manipulating their allegations merely to cast their claims under one of the securities laws, rather than another. For all of these reasons, therefore, we overrule the decision in Wilko.

Justice John Paul Stevens wrote the brief dissent, joined by Harry Blackmun, who had written the main McMahon dissent, William Brennan and Thurgood Marshall. He began by noting that the Court had properly repudiated the "indefensible brand of judicial activism" the Fifth Circuit had shown in ruling against Wilko. While the Court itself was not so bound to uphold its own precedents, it should be circumspect in doing so in cases like this that had become so settled that Congress had carefully avoided any legislative changes which might complicate or overrule it.

"In the final analysis," he wrote, "a Justice's vote in a case like this depends more on his or her views about the respective lawmaking responsibilities of Congress and this Court than on conflicting policy interests. Judges who have confidence in their own ability to fashion public policy are less hesitant to change the law than those of us who are inclined to give wide latitude to the views of the voters' representatives on nonconstitutional matters." While he had admittedly helped start the discussions about the various interpretations of Wilko in his dissent in Scherk v. Alberto-Culver, Inc. while chief judge of the Seventh Circuit, he said "[n]one of these arguments, however, carries sufficient weight to tip the balance between judicial and legislative authority and overturn an interpretation of an Act of Congress that has been settled for many years."

== Post-decision arbitration reform ==
In the wake of the decision, commentators anticipated a flood of new arbitration before the various industry panels and called for reform. "The practical effect of McMahon," wrote Costantine Katsoris, a Fordham Law professor and longtime NYSE arbitrator, "is that securities arbitrations will multiply, because it effectively sealed the escape valve of a separate ... 1934 Act hearing in federal court." A year after the decision, he noted, the 1987 stock market crash, made that prediction a reality.

Arbitrators had already been discussing reforms to the process, and in a Fordham Urban Law Journal article, Katsoris considered various proposals. "What is attractive about arbitration is that it is generally speedy, economical and fair," he wrote. "Obviously, improvements can always be made; but, we should retain the basic characteristics of arbitration." He argued against Congressional action overruling McMahon, since that would only mean a return to the bifurcated proceedings left in the wake of Byrd.

Since many new arbitrants would have been expecting to litigate claims, the arbitration should be sensitive to that and allow more extensive discovery processes before the hearing, with the steady guidance of an arbitrator to ensure that aspect of the process did not become as time-consuming as it had in litigation. Arbitrators should also be more knowledgeable since they would now have to consider more complex claims than they previously had, and provide more extensive disclosure and biographical information.

However, Katsoris also argued against making arbitration clauses mandatory. "[They] should be entered into freely and their meaning expressed in plain open language." Their language should also be standardized to avoid "traps" such as one broker shortening the statute of limitations to a year, and another specifying New York law, under which punitive damages cannot be awarded in arbitration.

He was ambivalent about requiring written opinions of arbitrators. While generally opposing them on the grounds that they would slow the process down, since the losing party would in many instances simply use it as the starting point for an appeal, he allowed that arbitrators should at least have to put it in writing if they were making their decision on one aspect of the case. The SEC ultimately agreed and declined to order written opinions of arbitrators.

Several years later, after Rodriguez de Quijas had expanded securities arbitration even further, Lynn Katzler, a Washington College of Law student, disagreed. "For the sake of fairness and investor protection, the SEC should have required written opinions," she wrote. "It should not have delegated the responsibility to the good sense of arbitrators." She addressed many of the opposing arguments, and concluded that the benefits of requiring a written opinion from arbitrators more than offset the costs, and would be in accord with the Court's decisions. "[A] statement of reasons would effectuate Congress' intent behind the Securities Act and the Exchange Act, while recognizing the Federal Arbitration Act's special policy favoring arbitration."

Reforms continued, and in the early 2000s students and faculty at the Pace Law School's Securities Arbitration Clinic wrote about the long-term effects. In 2003, Professor Barbara Black reviewed cases and found that increasingly it was the brokerage firms trying to use the courts to break arbitration clauses. The clinic's associate director, Jill Gross, reviewed the reforms 20 years after the case and concluded that the process was fairer to investors. While she noted some unresolved issues, such as the "paradox" created by McMahon under which investors would have a hard time proving that securities arbitration procedures did not meet FAA standards if those same standards had been approved by the SEC, she noted that the McMahons would probably turn to arbitration anyway were their case heard today since changes to the 1934 Act had shortened the statute of limitations and made it harder to prove scienter. "Instead, most customer arbitrations today are predicated on state securities acts and common law claims such as breach of fiduciary duty, negligent misrepresentation and fraud, and draw heavily on principles of equity" she wrote. "The ultimate irony is that, even though the Supreme Court opened the door to securities arbitration, even without the McMahon decision, today’s customers would continue to pursue their claims in arbitration."

== Analysis and commentary ==
In her otherwise laudatory paper on the results of the increase in arbitration, Gross noted a "paradox" of the decision: its reliance on both the FAA and an increased confidence in SEC oversight of the arbitration process. "If the SEC has approved NASD rules for notice and a hearing, then how can a party convincingly argue that those same rules are fundamentally unfair within the meaning of the FAA?" she asked. "In other words, the SEC-approval process might strip parties of their right to argue that the arbitration hearing is not fundamentally fair under modern FAA jurisprudence."

University of Nebraska College of Law professor C. Steven Bradford examined the lower-court anticipatory overrulings of Wilko in the wake of McMahon that led to Rodriguez de Quijas in a 1990 article critical of the Court's response to the practice in the latter case. He noted that the practice had a long history and had been tolerated and tacitly encouraged by the Court in other cases. After McMahon, he noted, lower courts could have avoided the Wilko questions, particularly by relying on an SEC regulation that required arbitration clauses to allow claims to be brought in federal court, or looked to a narrow reading of the contractual language. Yet few did, and even courts that did not need to reach the Wilko question nevertheless did so.

"The lower courts that rejected Wilko in the aftermath of McMahon were not doing so to be unfaithful to Wilko," Bradford wrote, "they were doing so to be faithful to McMahon." While he faulted them for "ignor[ing] scholarly commentary and a number of prior federal cases explicitly dealing with the effect of doubtful Supreme Court precedent" he found greater fault with the McMahon majority.

The Supreme Court was effectively overruling Wilko and it knew it was effectively overruling Wilko. The Court's refusal to do so outright, or at least to offer a clear signal as to its direction, was a disservice to the federal judiciary and imposed a substantial cost on private litigants and the lower courts.

If Blackmun's dissent recognized that, he wondered, how could the majority not have? The ensuing decision in Rodriguez suggested to him that it did. Lower courts, he concluded, must in such cases be free to use anticipatory overruling.

== See also ==
- List of United States Supreme Court cases, volume 482
- List of United States Supreme Court cases by the Rehnquist Court
