= 2023 term United States Supreme Court opinions of Ketanji Brown Jackson =

The 2023 term of the Supreme Court of the United States began October 2, 2023, and concluded October 7, 2024. This was the second term of Associate Justice Ketanji Brown Jackson's tenure on the Court.
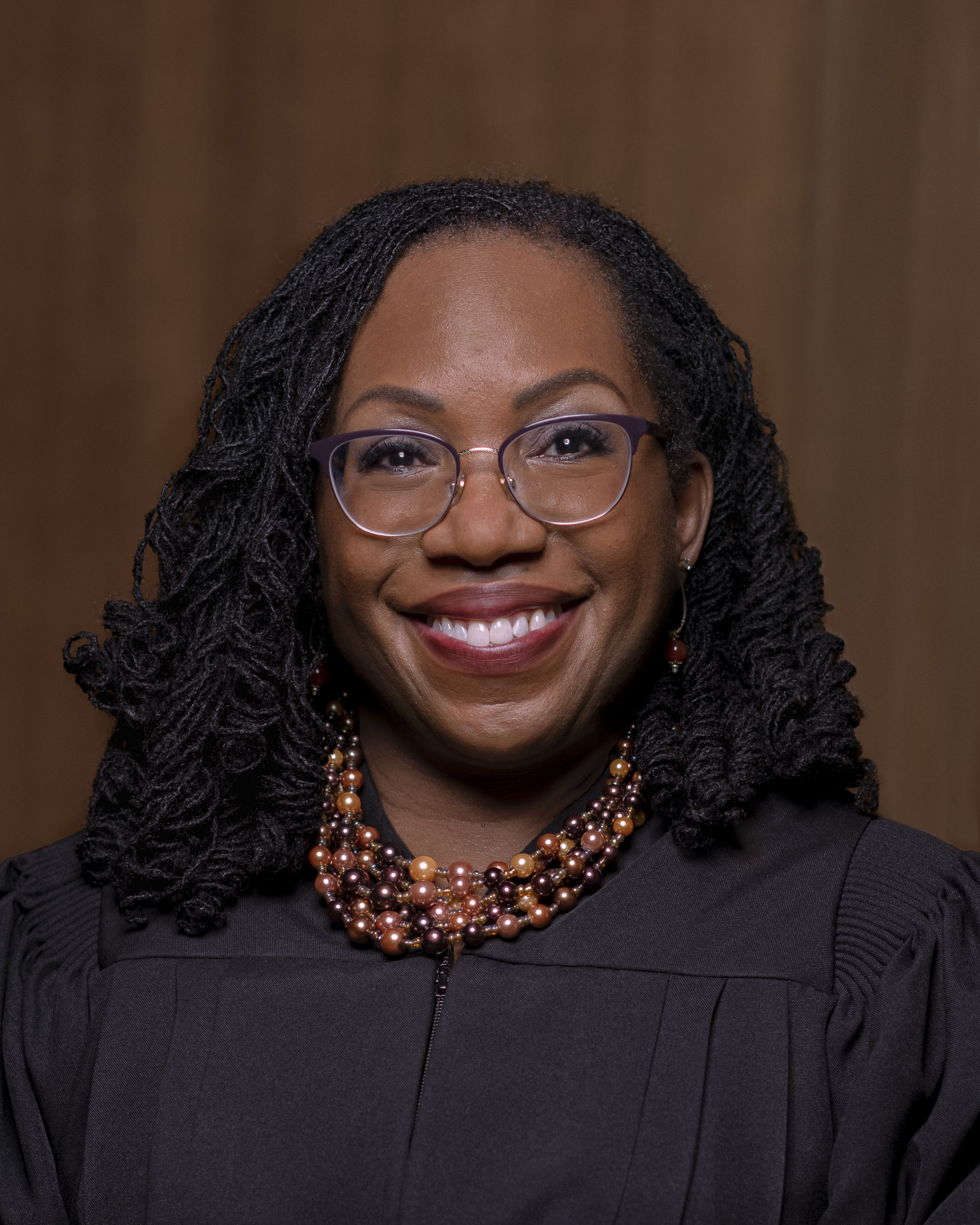

Ketanji Brown Jackson 2023 term statistics

| 5 | Majority or plurality | 12 | Concurrence | 0 | Other |
| 13 | Dissent | 2 | Concurrence/dissent | Total = | 32 |
| Bench opinions = 25 | | Opinions relating to orders = 7 | | In-chambers opinions = 0 |
| Unanimous opinions: 2 | | Most joined by: Sotomayor (13) | | Least joined by: Thomas (2) |

| Type | Case | Citation | Issues | Joined by | Other opinions |
|---|---|---|---|---|---|
| | Robinson v. Ardoin | 601 U.S. ___ (2023) | | | |
Jackson concurred in the Court's denial of applications for stays.
| | Johnson v. Prentice | 601 U.S. ___ (2023) | | Sotomayor, Kagan | |
Jackson dissented from the Court's denial of certiorari.
| | Acheson Hotels, LLC v. Laufer | 601 U.S. ___ (2023) | | | Barrett; Thomas |
| | McElrath v. Georgia | 601 U.S. ___ (2024) | | Unanimous | Alito |
| | Trump v. Anderson | 601 U.S. ___ (2024) | | | per curiam; Barrett |
Signed jointly with Sotomayor and Kagan.
| | Wilkinson v. Garland | 601 U.S. ___ (2024) | | | Sotomayor; Roberts; Alito |
| | Michaels v. Davis | 601 U.S. ___ (2024) | | | |
Jackson dissented from the Court's denial of certiorari.
| | Labrador v. Poe | 601 U.S. ___ (2024) | | Sotomayor | Gorsuch; Kavanaugh |
Jackson dissented from the Court's grant of application for stay.
| | Rudisill v. McDonough | 601 U.S. ___ (2024) | | Roberts, Sotomayor, Kagan, Gorsuch, Kavanaugh, Barrett | Kavanaugh; Thomas |
| | Sandoval v. Texas | 601 U.S. ___ (2024) | | Sotomayor | |
Jackson dissented from the Court's denial of certiorari.
| | Robinson v. Callais | 601 U.S. ___ (2024) | | | |
Jackson dissented from the Court's grant of applications for stays.
| | Consumer Financial Protection Bureau v. Community Financial Services Association of America, Limited | 601 U.S. ___ (2024) | | | Thomas; Kagan; Alito |
| | Brown v. United States | 602 U.S. ___ (2024) | | Kagan; Gorsuch (in part) | Alito |
| | Coinbase, Inc. v. Suski | 602 U.S. ___ (2024) | | Unanimous | Gorsuch |
| | Thornell v. Jones | 602 U.S. ___ (2024) | | | Alito; Sotomayor |
| | National Rifle Association of America v. Vullo | 602 U.S. ___ (2024) | | | Sotomayor; Gorsuch |
| | Starbucks Corporation v. McKinney | 602 U.S. ___ (2024) | | | Thomas |
| | Campos-Chaves v. Garland | 602 U.S. ___ (2024) | | Sotomayor, Kagan, Gorsuch | Alito |
| | Office of the United States Trustee v. John Q. Hammons Fall 2006, LLC | 602 U.S. ___ (2024) | | Roberts, Alito, Sotomayor, Kagan, Kavanaugh | Gorsuch |
| | Diaz v. United States | 602 U.S. ___ (2024) | | | Thomas; Gorsuch |
| | Moore v. United States | 602 U.S. ___ (2024) | | | Kavanaugh; Barrett; Thomas |
| | Gonzalez v. Trevino | 602 U.S. ___ (2024) | | Sotomayor | per curiam; Alito; Kavanaugh; Thomas |
| | United States v. Rahimi | 602 U.S. ___ (2024) | | | Roberts; Sotomayor; Gorsuch; Kavanaugh; Barrett; Thomas |
| | Erlinger v. United States | 602 U.S. ___ (2024) | | | Gorsuch; Roberts; Thomas; Kavanaugh |
| | Texas v. New Mexico and Colorado | 602 U.S. ___ (2024) | | Roberts, Sotomayor, Kagan, Kavanaugh | Gorsuch |
| | Snyder v. United States | 603 U.S. ___ (2024) | | Sotomayor, Kagan | Kavanaugh; Gorsuch |
| | Moyle v. United States | 603 U.S. ___ (2024) | | | per curiam; Kagan; Barrett; Alito |
| | Fischer v. United States | 603 U.S. ___ (2024) | | | Roberts; Barrett |
| | Trump v. United States | 603 U.S. ___ (2024) | | | Roberts; Thomas; Barrett; Sotomayor |
| | Moody v. NetChoice, LLC | 603 U.S. ___ (2024) | | | Kagan; Barrett; Thomas; Alito |
| | Corner Post, Inc. v. Board of Governors of the Federal Reserve System | 603 U.S. ___ (2024) | | Sotomayor, Kagan | Barrett; Kavanaugh |
| | King v. Emmons | 603 U.S. ___ (2024) | | Sotomayor | |
Jackson dissented from the Court's denial of certiorari.
