= 2023 term United States Supreme Court opinions of Samuel Alito =

The 2023 term of the Supreme Court of the United States began October 2, 2023, and concluded October 7, 2024. This was the nineteenth term of Associate Justice Samuel Alito's tenure on the Court.
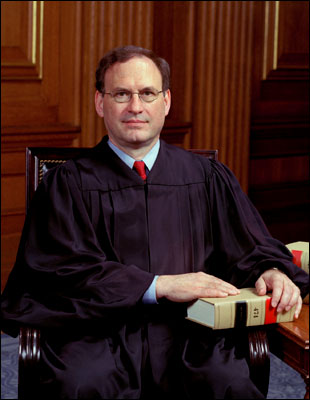

Samuel Alito 2023 term statistics

4	Majority or plurality	8	Concurrence	1	Other
8	Dissent	0	Concurrence/dissent	Total =	21
Bench opinions = 16		Opinions relating to orders = 5		In-chambers opinions = 0
Unanimous opinions: 0		Most joined by: Thomas (9)		Least joined by: Kagan, Jackson (0)

Type	Case	Citation	Issues	Joined by	Other opinions
	Murthy v. Missouri	601 U.S. ___ (2023)		Thomas, Gorsuch	
Alito dissented from the Court's grant of application for stay.
	Tingley v. Ferguson	601 U.S. ___ (2023)			Thomas
Alito dissented from the Court's denial of certiorari.
	Murthy v. Missouri	601 U.S. ___ (2023)			
Alito dissented from the Court's denial of Kennedy plaintiffs' motion to intervene.
	Murray v. UBS Securities, LLC	601 U.S. ___ (2024)		Barrett	Sotomayor
	Missouri Department of Corrections v. Finney	601 U.S. ___ (2024)			
Alito filed a statement respecting the Court's denial of certiorari.
	Coalition for TJ v. Fairfax County School Board	601 U.S. ___ (2024)		Thomas	
Alito dissented from the Court's denial of certiorari.
	McElrath v. Georgia	601 U.S. ___ (2024)			Jackson
	Wilkinson v. Garland	601 U.S. ___ (2024)		Roberts, Thomas	Sotomayor; Jackson; Roberts
	Federal Bureau of Investigation v. Fikre	601 U.S. ___ (2024)		Kavanaugh	Gorsuch
	Muldrow v. City of St. Louis	601 U.S. ___ (2024)			Kagan; Thomas; Kavanaugh
	Consumer Financial Protection Bureau v. Community Financial Services Association of America, Limited	601 U.S. ___ (2024)		Gorsuch	Thomas; Kagan; Jackson
	Alexander v. South Carolina State Conference of the NAACP	602 U.S. ___ (2024)		Roberts, Gorsuch, Kavanaugh, Barrett; Thomas (in part)	Thomas; Kagan
	Brown v. United States	602 U.S. ___ (2024)		Roberts, Thomas, Sotomayor, Kavanaugh, Barrett	Jackson
	Thornell v. Jones	602 U.S. ___ (2024)		Roberts, Thomas, Gorsuch, Kavanaugh, Barrett	Sotomayor; Jackson
	Garland v. Cargill	602 U.S. ___ (2024)			Thomas; Sotomayor
	Campos-Chaves v. Garland	602 U.S. ___ (2024)		Roberts, Thomas, Kavanaugh, Barrett	Jackson
	Gonzalez v. Trevino	602 U.S. ___ (2024)			per curiam; Kavanaugh; Jackson; Thomas
	Smith v. Arizona	602 U.S. ___ (2024)			Kagan; Thomas; Gorsuch
	Murthy v. Missouri	603 U.S. ___ (2024)		Thomas, Gorsuch	Barrett
	Moyle v. United States	603 U.S. ___ (2024)		Thomas; Gorsuch (in part)	per curiam; Kagan; Barrett; Jackson
	Moody v. NetChoice, LLC	603 U.S. ___ (2024)		Thomas, Gorsuch	Kagan; Barrett; Jackson; Thomas
