= 2023 term United States Supreme Court opinions of Clarence Thomas =

The 2023 term of the Supreme Court of the United States began October 2, 2023, and concluded October 7, 2024. This was the thirty-third term of Associate Justice Clarence Thomas's tenure on the Court.
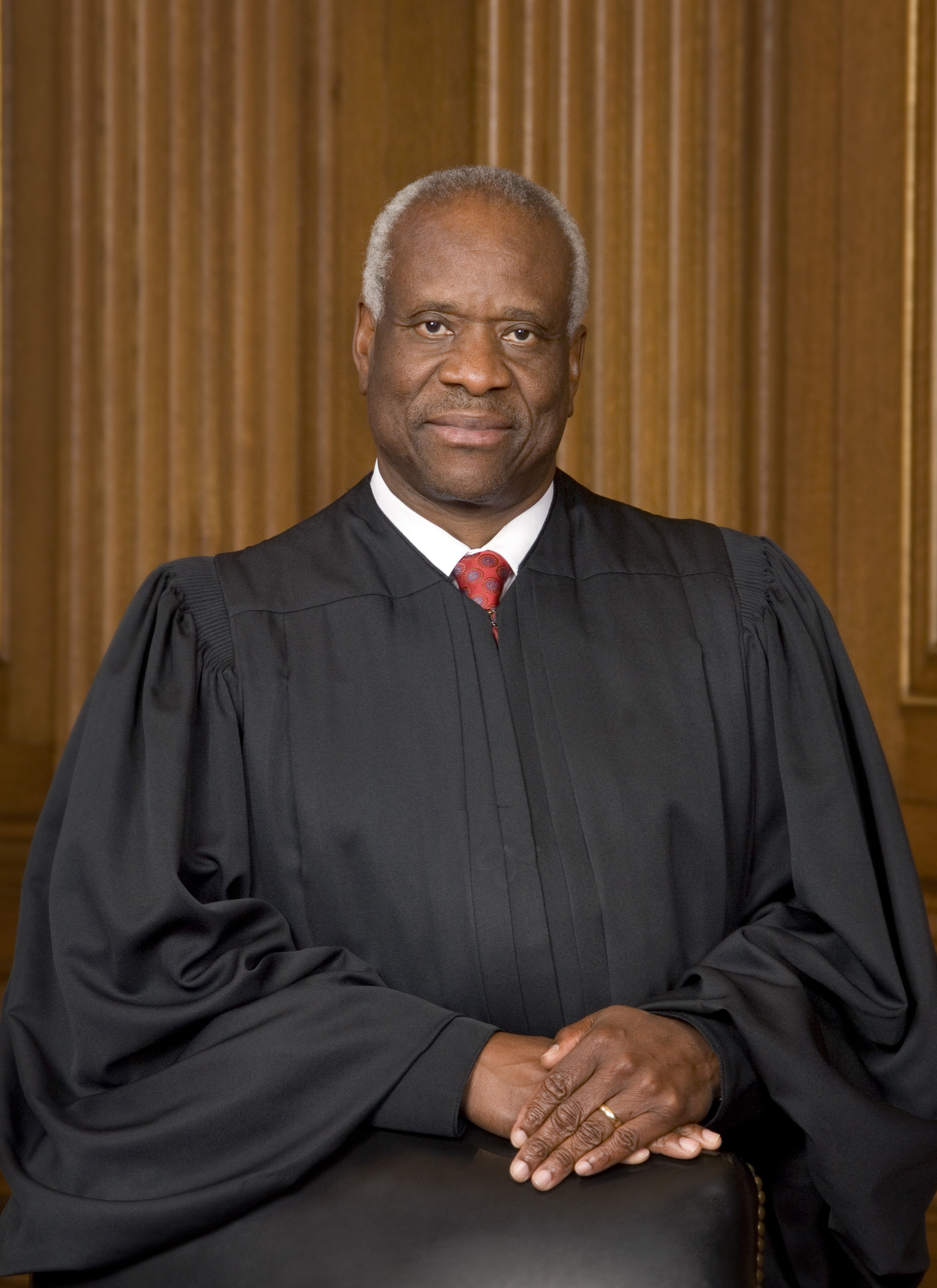

Clarence Thomas 2023 term statistics

7	Majority or plurality	12	Concurrence	2	Other
10	Dissent	0	Concurrence/dissent	Total =	31
Bench opinions = 23		Opinions relating to orders = 8		In-chambers opinions = 0
Unanimous opinions: 2		Most joined by: Alito (9)		Least joined by: Sotomayor, Kagan, Jackson (4)

Type	Case	Citation	Issues	Joined by	Other opinions
	Blankenship v. NBCUniversal, LLC	601 U.S. ___ (2023)			
Thomas concurred in the Court's denial of certiorari.
	E. I. du Pont de Nemours & Co. v. Abbott	601 U.S. ___ (2023)			
Thomas dissented from the Court's denial of certiorari.
	Acheson Hotels, LLC v. Laufer	601 U.S. ___ (2023)			Barrett; Jackson
	Tingley v. Ferguson	601 U.S. ___ (2023)			Alito
Thomas dissented from the Court's denial of certiorari.
	74 Pinehurst LLC v. New York	601 U.S. ___ (2024)			
Thomas filed a statement respecting the Court's denial of certiorari.
	Great Lakes Insurance SE v. Raiders Retreat Realty Co., LLC	601 U.S. ___ (2024)			Kavanaugh
	Speech First, Inc. v. Sands	601 U.S. ___ (2024)		Alito	
Thomas dissented from the Court's grant of certiorari, vacatur, and remand.
	DeVillier v. Texas	601 U.S. ___ (2024)		Unanimous	
	Rudisill v. McDonough	601 U.S. ___ (2024)		Alito	Jackson; Kavanaugh
	Muldrow v. City of St. Louis	601 U.S. ___ (2024)			Kagan; Alito; Kavanaugh
	Consumer Financial Protection Bureau v. Community Financial Services Association of America, Limited	601 U.S. ___ (2024)		Roberts, Sotomayor, Kagan, Kavanaugh, Barrett, Jackson	Kagan; Jackson; Alito
	Alexander v. South Carolina State Conference of the NAACP	602 U.S. ___ (2024)			Alito; Kagan
	Connelly v. United States	602 U.S. ___ (2024)		Unanimous	
	Vidal v. Elster	602 U.S. ___ (2024)		Alito, Gorsuch; Roberts, Kavanaugh, Barrett (in part)	Kavanaugh; Barrett; Sotomayor
	Starbucks Corporation v. McKinney	602 U.S. ___ (2024)		Roberts, Alito, Sotomayor, Kagan, Gorsuch, Kavanaugh, Barrett	Jackson
	FDA v. Alliance for Hippocratic Medicine	602 U.S. ___ (2024)			Kavanaugh
	Garland v. Cargill	602 U.S. ___ (2024)		Roberts, Alito, Gorsuch, Kavanaugh, Barrett	Alito; Sotomayor
	Diaz v. United States	602 U.S. ___ (2024)		Roberts, Alito, Kavanaugh, Barrett, Jackson	Jackson; Gorsuch
	Chiaverini v. City of Napoleon	602 U.S. ___ (2024)		Alito	Kagan; Gorsuch
	Moore v. United States	602 U.S. ___ (2024)		Gorsuch	Kavanaugh; Jackson; Barrett
	Gonzalez v. Trevino	602 U.S. ___ (2024)			per curiam; Alito; Kavanaugh; Jackson
	United States v. Rahimi	602 U.S. ___ (2024)			Roberts; Sotomayor; Gorsuch; Kavanaugh; Barrett; Jackson
	Smith v. Arizona	602 U.S. ___ (2024)			Kagan; Gorsuch; Alito
	Erlinger v. United States	602 U.S. ___ (2024)			Gorsuch; Roberts; Kavanaugh; Jackson
	Loper Bright Enterprises v. Raimondo	603 U.S. ___ (2024)			Roberts; Gorsuch; Kagan
	City of Grants Pass v. Johnson	603 U.S. ___ (2024)			Thomas; Sotomayor
	Trump v. United States	603 U.S. ___ (2024)			Roberts; Barrett; Sotomayor; Jackson
	Moody v. NetChoice, LLC	603 U.S. ___ (2024)			Kagan; Barrett; Jackson; Alito
	Harrel v. Raoul	603 U.S. ___ (2024)			
Thomas filed a statement respecting the Court's denial of certiorari.
	Allstates Refractory Contractors, LLC v. Su	603 U.S. ___ (2024)			
Thomas dissented from the Court's denial of certiorari.
	Doe v. Snap, Inc.	603 U.S. ___ (2024)		Gorsuch	
Thomas dissented from the Court's denial of certiorari.
