= 2023 term United States Supreme Court opinions of Amy Coney Barrett =

The 2023 term of the Supreme Court of the United States began October 2, 2023, and concluded October 7, 2024. This was the fourth term of Associate Justice Amy Coney Barrett's tenure on the Court.
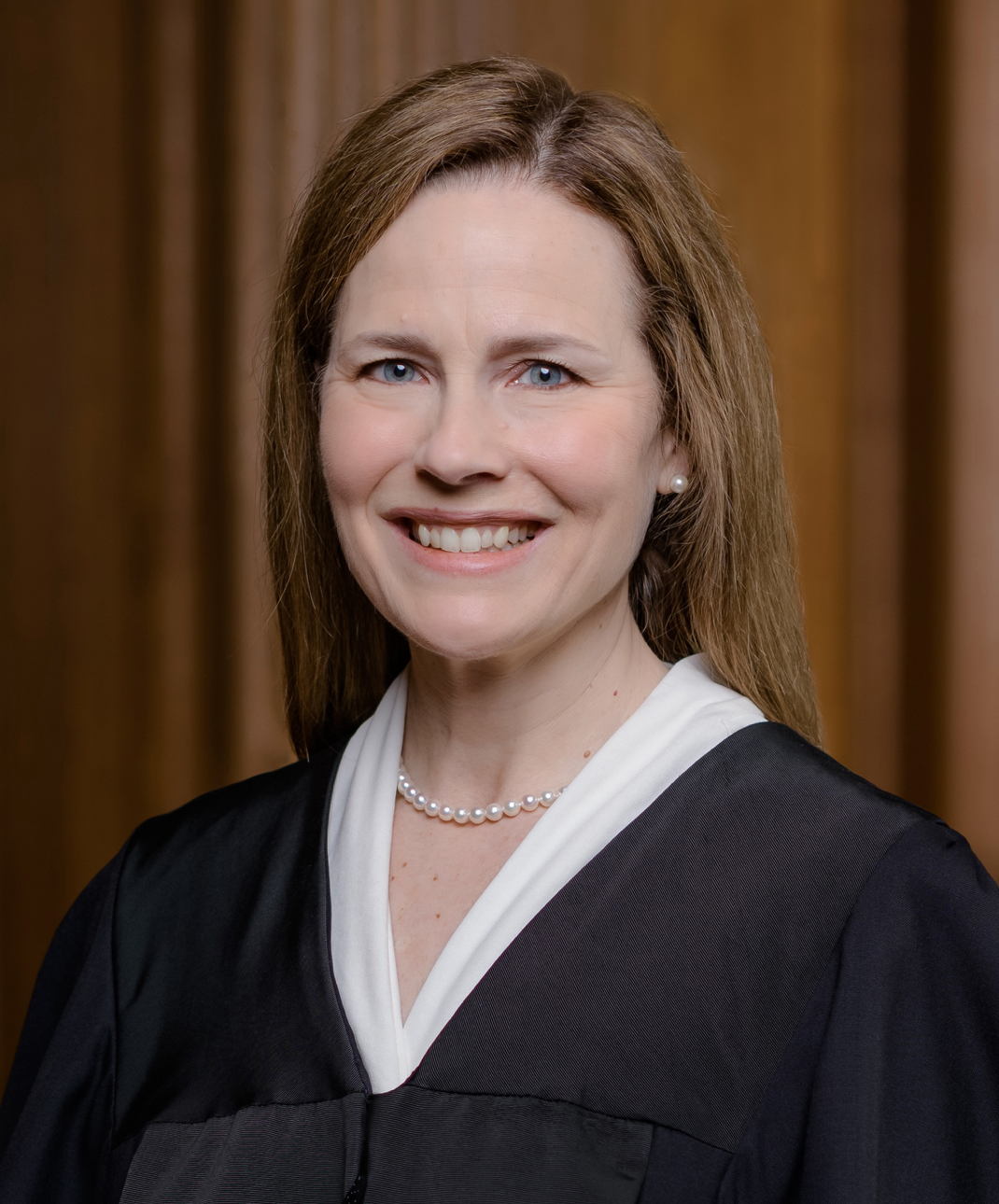

Amy Coney Barrett 2023 term statistics

6	Majority or plurality	8	Concurrence	0	Other
2	Dissent	0	Concurrence/dissent	Total =	16
Bench opinions = 15		Opinions relating to orders = 1		In-chambers opinions = 0
Unanimous opinions: 2		Most joined by: Kavanaugh (8)		Least joined by: Gorsuch (4)

Type	Case	Citation	Issues	Joined by	Other opinions
	Acheson Hotels, LLC v. Laufer	601 U.S. ___ (2023)		Roberts, Alito, Sotomayor, Kagan, Gorsuch, Kavanaugh	Thomas; Jackson
	Trump v. Anderson	601 U.S. ___ (2024)			per curiam; Sotomayor, Kagan, Jackson
	Lindke v. Freed	601 U.S. ___ (2024)		Unanimous	
	United States v. Texas	601 U.S. ___ (2024)		Kavanaugh	Sotomayor; Kagan
	Sheetz v. County of El Dorado	601 U.S. ___ (2024)		Unanimous	Sotomayor; Gorsuch; Kavanaugh
	Vidal v. Elster	602 U.S. ___ (2024)		Kagan; Sotomayor, Jackson (in part)	Thomas; Kavanaugh; Sotomayor
	Moore v. United States	602 U.S. ___ (2024)		Alito	Kavanaugh; Jackson; Thomas
	United States v. Rahimi	602 U.S. ___ (2024)			Roberts; Sotomayor; Gorsuch; Kavanaugh; Jackson; Thomas
	Department of State v. Muñoz	602 U.S. ___ (2024)		Roberts, Thomas, Alito, Kavanaugh	Gorsuch; Sotomayor
	Murthy v. Missouri	603 U.S. ___ (2024)		Roberts, Sotomayor, Kagan, Kavanaugh, Jackson	Alito
	Ohio v. EPA	603 U.S. ___ (2024)		Sotomayor, Kagan, Jackson	Gorsuch
	Moyle v. United States	603 U.S. ___ (2024)		Roberts, Kavanaugh	per curiam; Kagan; Jackson; Alito
	Fischer v. United States (2024)	603 U.S. ___ (2024)		Sotomayor, Kagan	Roberts; Jackson
	Trump v. United States	603 U.S. ___ (2024)			Roberts; Thomas; Sotomayor; Jackson
	Moody v. NetChoice, LLC	603 U.S. ___ (2024)			Kagan; Jackson; Thomas; Alito
	Corner Post, Inc. v. Board of Governors of the Federal Reserve System	603 U.S. ___ (2024)		Roberts, Thomas, Alito, Gorsuch, Kavanaugh	Kavanaugh; Jackson
