= 2023 term United States Supreme Court opinions of Sonia Sotomayor =

The 2023 term of the Supreme Court of the United States began October 2, 2023, and concluded October 7, 2024. This was the fifteenth term of Associate Justice Sonia Sotomayor's tenure on the Court.
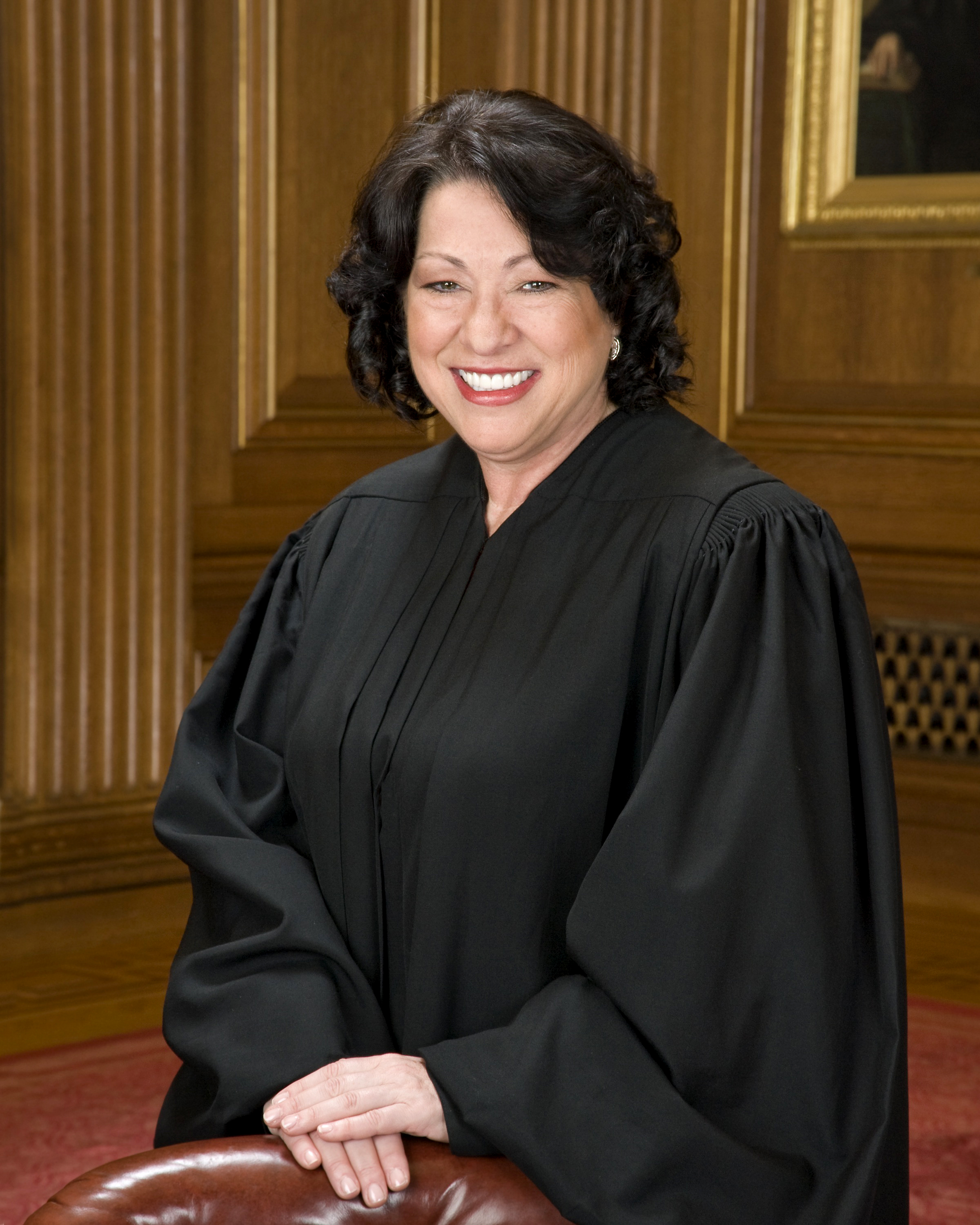

Sonia Sotomayor 2023 term statistics

7	Majority or plurality	4	Concurrence	5	Other
11	Dissent	0	Concurrence/dissent	Total =	27
Bench opinions = 18		Opinions relating to orders = 9		In-chambers opinions = 0
Unanimous opinions: 5		Most joined by: Jackson (17)		Least joined by: Alito (5)

Type	Case	Citation	Issues	Joined by	Other opinions
	King v. Brownback	601 U.S. ___ (2023)			
Sotomayor filed a statement respecting the Court's denial of certiorari.
	Smith v. Hamm	601 U.S. ___ (2024)			Kagan
Sotomayor dissented from the Court's denial of certiorari and application for stay of execution.
	Murray v. UBS Securities, LLC	601 U.S. ___ (2024)		Unanimous	Alito
	In re Bowe	601 U.S. ___ (2024)		Jackson	
Sotomayor filed a statement respecting the Court's denial of certiorari.
	Trump v. Anderson	601 U.S. ___ (2024)			per curiam; Barrett
Signed jointly with Kagan and Jackson.
	Wilkinson v. Garland	601 U.S. ___ (2024)		Kagan, Gorsuch, Kavanaugh, Barrett	Jackson; Roberts; Alito
	United States v. Texas	601 U.S. ___ (2024)		Jackson	Barrett; Kagan
	Macquarie Infrastructure Corp. v. Moab Partners, L.P.	601 U.S. ___ (2024)		Unanimous	
	Sheetz v. County of El Dorado	601 U.S. ___ (2024)		Jackson	Barrett; Gorsuch; Kavanaugh
	McKesson v. Doe	601 U.S. ___ (2024)			
Sotomayor filed a statement respecting the Court's denial of certiorari.
	Compton v. Texas	601 U.S. ___ (2024)		Jackson	
Sotomayor dissented from the Court's denial of certiorari.
	McIntosh v. United States	601 U.S. ___ (2024)		Unanimous	
	Culley v. Marshall	601 U.S. ___ (2024)		Kagan, Jackson	Kavanaugh; Gorsuch
	Smith v. Spizzirri	601 U.S. ___ (2024)		Unanimous	
	Thornell v. Jones	602 U.S. ___ (2024)		Kagan	Alito; Jackson
	National Rifle Association of America v. Vullo	602 U.S. ___ (2024)		Unanimous	Gorsuch; Jackson
	Truck Insurance Exchange v. Kaiser Gypsum Co.	602 U.S. ___ (2024)		Roberts, Thomas, Kagan, Gorsuch, Kavanaugh, Barrett	
	Vidal v. Elster	602 U.S. ___ (2024)		Kagan, Jackson	Thomas; Kavanaugh; Barrett
	Garland v. Cargill	602 U.S. ___ (2024)		Kagan, Jackson	Thomas; Alito
	United States v. Rahimi	602 U.S. ___ (2024)		Kagan	Roberts; Gorsuch; Kavanaugh; Barrett; Jackson; Thomas
	Department of State v. Muñoz	602 U.S. ___ (2024)		Kagan, Jackson	Barrett; Gorsuch
	SEC v. Jarkesy	603 U.S. ___ (2024)		Kagan, Jackson	Roberts; Gorsuch
	City of Grants Pass v. Johnson	603 U.S. ___ (2024)		Kagan, Jackson	Gorsuch; Thomas
	Trump v. United States	603 U.S. ___ (2024)		Kagan, Jackson	Roberts; Thomas; Barrett; Jackson
	Price v. Montgomery County, Kentucky	603 U.S. ___ (2024)			
Sotomayor filed a statement respecting the Court's denial of certiorari.
	McCrory v. Alabama	603 U.S. ___ (2024)			
Sotomayor filed a statement respecting the Court's denial of certiorari.
	Bassett v. Arizona	603 U.S. ___ (2024)		Kagan, Jackson	
Sotomayor dissented from the Court's denial of certiorari.
