= 2023 term United States Supreme Court opinions of Neil Gorsuch =

Views of Justice Neil Gorsuch in 2023

The 2023 term of the Supreme Court of the United States began October 2, 2023, and concluded October 7, 2024. This was the eighth term of Associate Justice Neil Gorsuch's tenure on the Court.
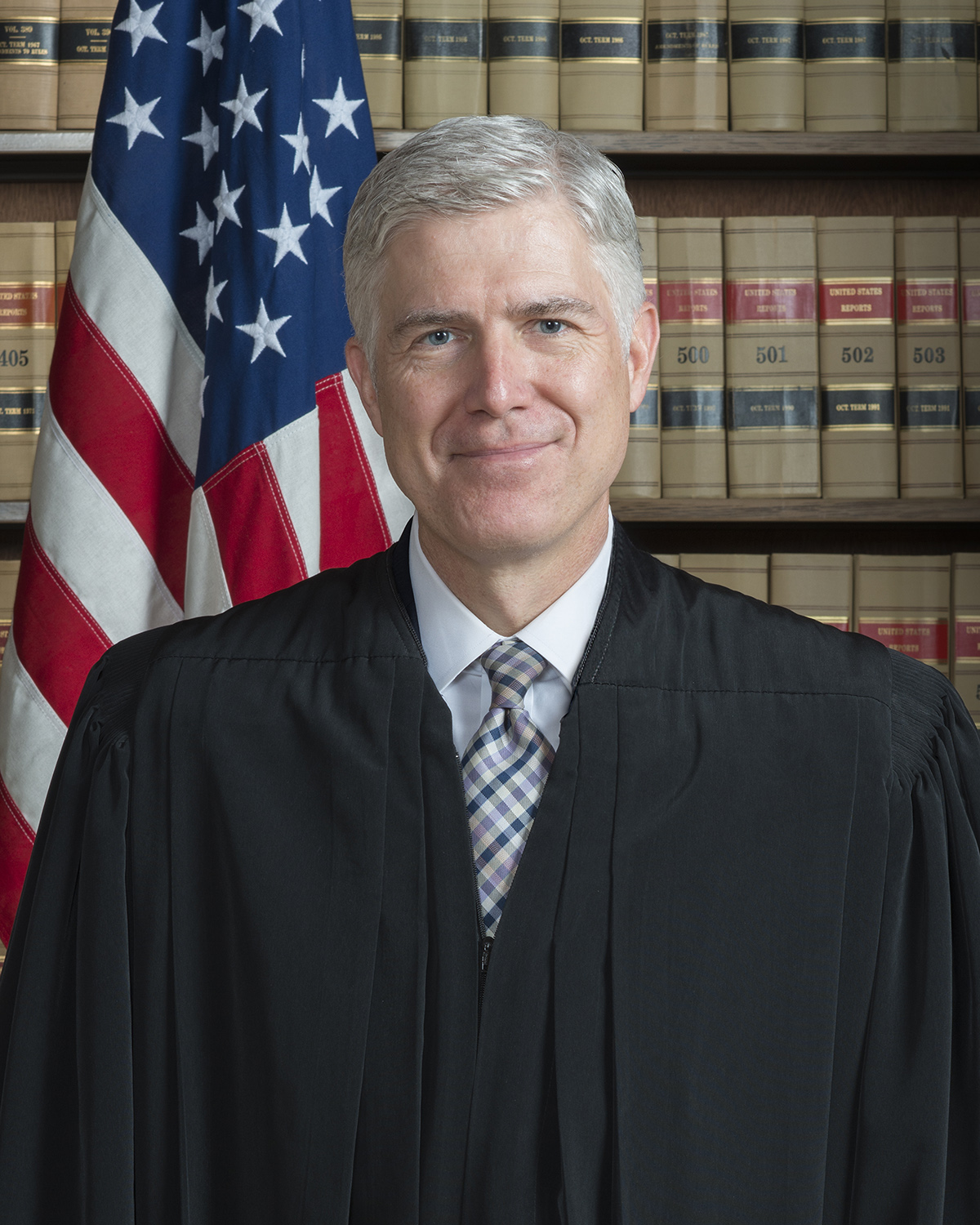

Neil Gorsuch 2023 term statistics

6	Majority or plurality	11	Concurrence	1	Other
7	Dissent	0	Concurrence/dissent	Total =	25
Bench opinions = 22		Opinions relating to orders = 3		In-chambers opinions = 0
Unanimous opinions: 2		Most joined by: Alito (9)		Least joined by: Kagan, Kavanaugh, Jackson (4)

Type	Case	Citation	Issues	Joined by	Other opinions
	Missouri v. United States	601 U.S. ___ (2023)		Alito	
Gorsuch filed a statement respecting the Court's denial of application for stay.
	Department of Agriculture Rural Development Rural Housing Service v. Kirtz	601 U.S. ___ (2024)		Unanimous	
	Pulsifer v. United States	601 U.S. ___ (2024)		Sotomayor, Jackson	Kagan
	Federal Bureau of Investigation v. Fikre	601 U.S. ___ (2024)		Unanimous	Alito
	Sheetz v. County of El Dorado	601 U.S. ___ (2024)			Barrett; Sotomayor; Kavanaugh
	Labrador v. Poe	601 U.S. ___ (2024)		Thomas, Alito	Kavanaugh; Jackson
Gorsuch concurred in the Court's grant of application for stay.
	Warner Chappell Music, Inc. v. Nealy	601 U.S. ___ (2024)		Thomas, Alito	Kagan
	Culley v. Marshall	601 U.S. ___ (2024)		Thomas	Kavanaugh; Sotomayor
	Coinbase, Inc. v. Suski	602 U.S. ___ (2024)			Jackson
	Cunningham v. Florida	602 U.S. ___ (2024)			
Gorsuch dissented from the Court's denial of certiorari.
	National Rifle Association of America v. Vullo	602 U.S. ___ (2024)			Sotomayor; Jackson
	Office of the United States Trustee v. John Q. Hammons Fall 2006, LLC	602 U.S. ___ (2024)		Thomas, Barrett	Jackson
	Diaz v. United States	602 U.S. ___ (2024)		Sotomayor, Kagan	Thomas; Jackson
	Chiaverini v. City of Napoleon	602 U.S. ___ (2024)			Kagan; Thomas
	United States v. Rahimi	602 U.S. ___ (2024)			Roberts; Sotomayor; Kavanaugh; Barrett; Jackson; Thomas
	Smith v. Arizona	602 U.S. ___ (2024)			Kagan; Thomas; Alito
	Erlinger v. United States	602 U.S. ___ (2024)		Roberts, Thomas, Sotomayor, Kagan, Barrett	Roberts; Thomas; Kavanaugh; Jackson
	Department of State v. Muñoz	602 U.S. ___ (2024)			Barrett; Sotomayor
	Texas v. New Mexico and Colorado	602 U.S. ___ (2024)		Thomas, Alito, Barrett	Jackson
	Snyder v. United States	603 U.S. ___ (2024)			Kavanaugh; Jackson
	SEC v. Jarkesy	603 U.S. ___ (2024)		Thomas	Roberts; Sotomayor
	Harrington v. Purdue Pharma L.P.	603 U.S. ___ (2024)		Thomas, Alito, Barrett, Jackson	Kavanaugh
	Ohio v. EPA	603 U.S. ___ (2024)		Roberts, Thomas, Alito, Kavanaugh	Barrett
	Loper Bright Enterprises v. Raimondo	603 U.S. ___ (2024)			Roberts; Thomas; Kagan
	City of Grants Pass v. Johnson	603 U.S. ___ (2024)		Roberts, Thomas, Alito, Kavanaugh, Barrett	Thomas; Sotomayor
