= 2023 term United States Supreme Court opinions of Elena Kagan =

The 2023 term of the Supreme Court of the United States began October 2, 2023, and concluded October 7, 2024. This was the fourteenth term of Associate Justice Elena Kagan's tenure on the Court.
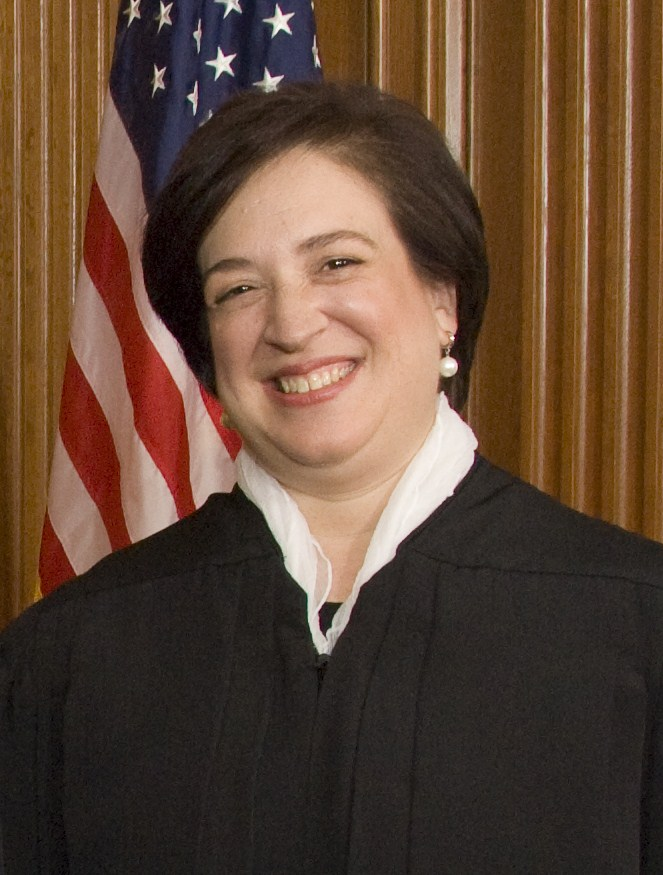

Elena Kagan 2023 term statistics

| 7 | Majority or plurality | 3 | Concurrence | 0 | Other |
| 5 | Dissent | 0 | Concurrence/dissent | Total = | 15 |
| Bench opinions = 12 | | Opinions relating to orders = 3 | | In-chambers opinions = 0 |
| Unanimous opinions: 1 | | Most joined by: Sotomayor (11) | | Least joined by: Alito (2) |

| Type | Case | Citation | Issues | Joined by | Other opinions |
|---|---|---|---|---|---|
| | Petteway v. Galveston County | 601 U.S. ___ (2023) | | Sotomayor, Jackson | |
| | Smith v. Hamm | 601 U.S. ___ (2024) | | Jackson | Sotomayor |
Kagan dissented from the Court's denial of certiorari and application for stay of execution.
| | Trump v. Anderson | 601 U.S. ___ (2024) | | | per curiam; Barrett |
Signed jointly with Sotomayor and Jackson.
| | Pulsifer v. United States | 601 U.S. ___ (2024) | | Roberts, Thomas, Alito, Kavanaugh, Barrett | Gorsuch |
| | United States v. Texas | 601 U.S. ___ (2024) | | | Barrett; Sotomayor |
| | Muldrow v. City of St. Louis | 601 U.S. ___ (2024) | | Roberts, Sotomayor, Gorsuch, Barrett, Jackson | Thomas; Alito; Kavanaugh |
| | Warner Chappell Music, Inc. v. Nealy | 601 U.S. ___ (2024) | | Roberts, Sotomayor, Kavanaugh, Barrett, Jackson | Gorsuch |
| | Consumer Financial Protection Bureau v. Community Financial Services Association of America, Limited | 601 U.S. ___ (2024) | | Sotomayor, Kavanaugh, Barrett | Thomas; Jackson; Alito |
| | Harrow v. Department of Defense | 601 U.S. ___ (2024) | | Unanimous | |
| | Alexander v. South Carolina State Conference of the NAACP | 602 U.S. ___ (2024) | | Sotomayor, Jackson | Alito; Thomas |
| | Chiaverini v. City of Napoleon | 602 U.S. ___ (2024) | | Roberts, Sotomayor, Kavanaugh, Barrett, Jackson | Thomas; Gorsuch |
| | Smith v. Arizona | 602 U.S. ___ (2024) | | Sotomayor, Kavanaugh, Barrett, Jackson; Thomas, Gorsuch (in part) | Thomas; Gorsuch; Alito |
| | Moyle v. United States | 603 U.S. ___ (2024) | | Sotomayor; Jackson (in part) | per curiam; Barrett; Jackson; Alito |
| | Loper Bright Enterprises v. Raimondo | 603 U.S. ___ (2024) | | Sotomayor; Jackson (in part) | Roberts; Thomas; Gorsuch |
| | Moody v. NetChoice, LLC | 603 U.S. ___ (2024) | | Roberts, Sotomayor, Kavanaugh, Barrett; Jackson (in part) | Barrett; Jackson; Thomas; Alito |
