= 2023 term United States Supreme Court opinions of Brett Kavanaugh =

The 2023 term of the Supreme Court of the United States began October 2, 2023, and concluded October 7, 2024. This was the sixth term of Associate Justice Brett Kavanaugh's tenure on the Court.
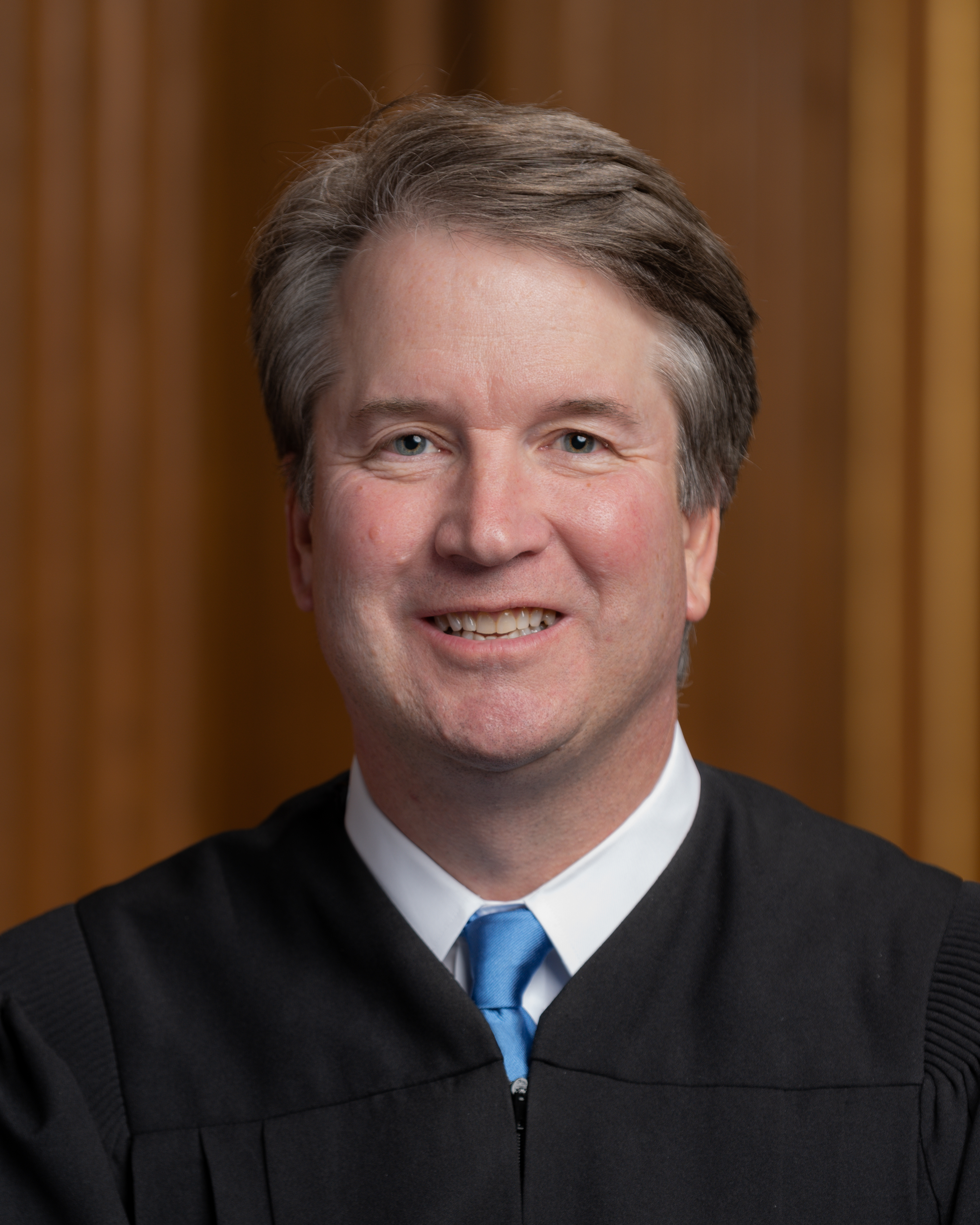

Brett Kavanaugh 2023 term statistics

6	Majority or plurality	8	Concurrence	1	Other
3	Dissent	0	Concurrence/dissent	Total =	18
Bench opinions = 16		Opinions relating to orders = 2		In-chambers opinions = 0
Unanimous opinions: 3		Most joined by: Roberts, Barrett (8)		Least joined by: Sotomayor, Gorsuch (5)

Type	Case	Citation	Issues	Joined by	Other opinions
	West Flagler Associates, Ltd. v. Haaland	601 U.S. ___ (2023)			
	Great Lakes Insurance SE v. Raiders Retreat Realty Co., LLC	601 U.S. ___ (2024)		Unanimous	Thomas
	Sheetz v. County of El Dorado	601 U.S. ___ (2024)		Kagan, Jackson	Barrett; Sotomayor; Gorsuch
	Labrador v. Poe	601 U.S. ___ (2024)		Barrett	Gorsuch; Jackson
Kavanaugh concurred in the Court's grant of application for stay.
	Rudisill v. McDonough	601 U.S. ___ (2024)		Barrett	Jackson; Thomas
	Muldrow v. City of St. Louis	601 U.S. ___ (2024)			Kagan; Thomas; Alito
	Culley v. Marshall	601 U.S. ___ (2024)		Roberts, Thomas, Alito, Gorsuch, Barrett	Gorsuch; Sotomayor
	Cantero v. Bank of America, N. A.	602 U.S. ___ (2024)		Unanimous	
	Becerra v. San Carlos Apache Tribe	602 U.S. ___ (2024)		Thomas, Alito, Barrett	Roberts
	Vidal v. Elster	602 U.S. ___ (2024)		Roberts	Thomas; Barrett; Sotomayor
	FDA v. Alliance for Hippocratic Medicine	602 U.S. ___ (2024)		Unanimous	Thomas
	Moore v. United States	602 U.S. ___ (2024)		Roberts, Sotomayor, Kagan, Jackson	Jackson; Barrett; Thomas
	Gonzalez v. Trevino	602 U.S. ___ (2024)			per curiam; Alito; Jackson; Thomas
	United States v. Rahimi	602 U.S. ___ (2024)			Roberts; Sotomayor; Gorsuch; Barrett; Jackson; Thomas
	Erlinger v. United States	602 U.S. ___ (2024)		Alito; Jackson (in part)	Gorsuch; Roberts; Thomas; Jackson
	Snyder v. United States	603 U.S. ___ (2024)		Roberts, Thomas, Alito, Gorsuch, Barrett	Gorsuch; Jackson
	Harrington v. Purdue Pharma L.P.	603 U.S. ___ (2024)		Roberts, Sotomayor, Kagan	Gorsuch
	Corner Post, Inc. v. Board of Governors of the Federal Reserve System	603 U.S. ___ (2024)			Barrett; Jackson
