= 2023 term United States Supreme Court opinions of John Roberts =

The 2023 term of the Supreme Court of the United States began October 2, 2023, and concluded October 7, 2024. This was the nineteenth term of Chief Justice John Roberts's tenure on the Court.
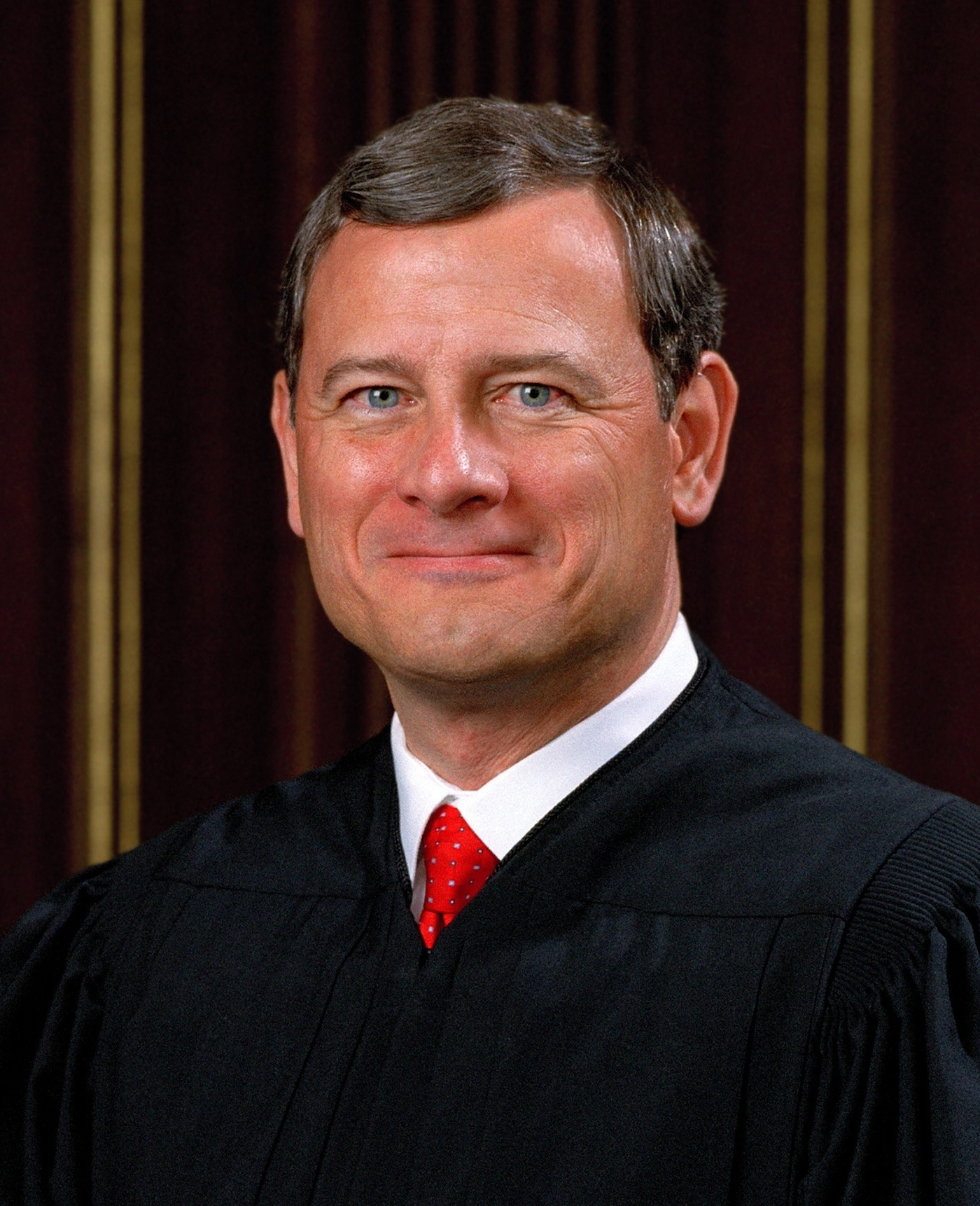

John Roberts 2023 term statistics

7	Majority or plurality	1	Concurrence	1	Other
1	Dissent	0	Concurrence/dissent	Total =	10
Bench opinions = 9		Opinions relating to orders = 0		In-chambers opinions = 1
Unanimous opinions: 1		Most joined by: Gorsuch (7)		Least joined by: Sotomayor, Kagan (3)

Type	Case	Citation	Issues	Joined by	Other opinions
	Navarro v. United States	601 U.S. ___ (2024)			
	Wilkinson v. Garland	601 U.S. ___ (2024)			Sotomayor; Jackson; Alito
	Bissonnette v. LePage Bakeries Park St., LLC	601 U.S. ___ (2024)		Unanimous	
	Becerra v. San Carlos Apache Tribe	602 U.S. ___ (2024)		Sotomayor, Kagan, Gorsuch, Jackson	Kavanaugh
	United States v. Rahimi	602 U.S. ___ (2024)		Alito, Sotomayor, Kagan, Gorsuch, Kavanaugh, Barrett, Jackson	Sotomayor; Gorsuch; Kavanaugh; Barrett; Jackson; Thomas
	Erlinger v. United States	602 U.S. ___ (2024)			Gorsuch; Thomas; Kavanaugh; Jackson
	SEC v. Jarkesy	603 U.S. ___ (2024)		Thomas, Alito, Gorsuch, Kavanaugh, Barrett	Gorsuch; Sotomayor
	Loper Bright Enterprises v. Raimondo	603 U.S. ___ (2024)		Thomas, Alito, Gorsuch, Kavanaugh, Barrett	Thomas; Gorsuch; Kagan
	Fischer v. United States (2024)	603 U.S. ___ (2024)		Thomas, Alito, Gorsuch, Kavanaugh, Jackson	Jackson; Barrett
	Trump v. United States	603 U.S. ___ (2024)		Thomas, Alito, Gorsuch, Kavanaugh; Barrett (in part)	Thomas; Barrett; Sotomayor; Jackson
