= Campos-Chaves v. Garland =

- Supreme Court of the United States

Argued January 8, 2024 Decided June 14, 2024
- Full case name: Moris Esmelis Campos-Chaves v. Merrick B. Garland, Attorney General
- Docket no.: 22-674

Case history
- Prior: 54 F.4th 314

Questions presented
- If the government serves an initial notice document that does not include the "time and place" of proceedings, followed by an additional document containing that information, has the government provided notice "required under" and "in accordance with paragraph (1) or (2) of" section 1229(a) such that an immigration court must enter a removal order in absentia and deny a noncitizen's request to rescind that order?

Holding
- Because each of the undocumented people in this case received a proper §1229(a)(2) notice for the hearings they missed and at which they were ordered removed, they cannot seek rescission of their in absentia removal orders on the basis of defective notice under §1229a(b)(5)(C)(ii).

Court membership
- Chief Justice John Roberts Associate Justices Clarence Thomas · Samuel Alito; Sonia Sotomayor · Elena Kagan; Neil Gorsuch · Brett Kavanaugh; Amy Coney Barrett · Ketanji Brown Jackson

Case opinions
- Majority: Alito, joined by Roberts, Thomas, Kavanaugh, Barrett
- Dissent: Jackson, joined by Sotomayor, Kagan, Gorsuch

Campos-Chaves v. Garland, 602 U.S. 447 (2024), was a case before the Supreme Court of the United States. The case asks whether the government may comply with its obligations under 8 U.S.C. § 1229(a)(1) and (2) when it provides an initial notice to appear with a date and location "to be determined" and a subsequent notice with that information included.

The case is consolidated with Garland v. Singh and Garland v. Mendez-Colín (Docket No. 22-884). The Supreme Court heard oral arguments on January 8, 2024. On June 14, 2024, the Supreme Court decided the case in the government's favor, ruling that the notice provided to the undocumented immigrants was sufficient to justify their removal by an immigration judge.

== Background ==
Moris Esmelis Campos-Chaves is a citizen of El Salvador who entered the United States without authorization on January 24, 2005. The United States Department of Homeland Security initiated deportation proceedings against him, serving him with a notice to appear (NTA). The document did not include the "time and location" of the hearing. The government subsequently sent, and Campos-Chaves received, an updated NTA listing a time and location for his hearing. Campos-Chaves failed to appear at the hearing and was ordered removed in absentia. In 2018, he moved to re-open his case, alleging that his NTA was defective, so his removal order should be rescinded. The Immigration Judge denied his motion, the Board of Immigration Appeals affirmed the denial, and the United States Court of Appeals for the Fifth Circuit denied his petition to review the BIA decision.

Campos-Chaves appealed to the Supreme Court, which granted certiorari on June 30, 2023.

Garland v. Singh, which is factually similar and which touches on the same legal issues, is on appeal from the United States Court of Appeals for the Ninth Circuit. The Supreme Court consolidated this case with Campos-Chaves v. Garland, as well as with Garland v. Mendez-Colín, another Ninth Circuit case.

== See also ==
- Notice to Appear
