= Texas v. New Mexico and Colorado (2024) =

- Supreme Court of the United States

Argued March 20, 2024 Decided June 21, 2024
- Full case name: Texas v. New Mexico and Colorado
- Docket no.: 22O141
- Citations: 602 U.S. 943 (more)

Holding
- Because the proposed consent decree would dispose of the United States' Compact claims without its consent, the States' motion to enter the consent decree is denied.

Court membership
- Chief Justice John Roberts Associate Justices Clarence Thomas · Samuel Alito; Sonia Sotomayor · Elena Kagan; Neil Gorsuch · Brett Kavanaugh; Amy Coney Barrett · Ketanji Brown Jackson

Case opinions
- Majority: Jackson, joined by Roberts, Sotomayor, Kagan, Kavanaugh
- Dissent: Gorsuch, joined by Thomas, Alito, Barrett

Texas v. New Mexico and Colorado, 602 U.S. 943 (2024), was a United States Supreme Court case in which the Court denied the States' motion to enter the consent decree because the proposed consent decree would have disposed of the United States' Compact claims without its consent.

== See also ==
- Texas v. New Mexico and Colorado
