= Office of the United States Trustee v. John Q. Hammons Fall 2006, LLC =

- Supreme Court of the United States

Decided June 14, 2024
- Full case name: Office of the United States Trustee v. John Q. Hammons Fall 2006, LLC
- Docket no.: 22-1238
- Citations: 602 U.S. 487 (more)

Holding
- Prospective parity is the appropriate remedy for the short-lived and small disparity created by the fee statute held unconstitutional in Siegel v. Fitzgerald.

Court membership
- Chief Justice John Roberts Associate Justices Clarence Thomas · Samuel Alito; Sonia Sotomayor · Elena Kagan; Neil Gorsuch · Brett Kavanaugh; Amy Coney Barrett · Ketanji Brown Jackson

Case opinions
- Majority: Jackson
- Dissent: Gorsuch, joined by Thomas, Barrett

Office of the United States Trustee v. John Q. Hammons Fall 2006, LLC, 602 U.S. 487 (2024), was a United States Supreme Court case in which the court held that prospective parity is the appropriate remedy for the short-lived and small disparity created by the fee statute held unconstitutional in Siegel v. Fitzgerald.
