= Murthy v. Missouri =

United States first amendment case

- Supreme Court of the United States

Argued March 18, 2024 Decided June 26, 2024
- Full case name: Vivek H. Murthy, Surgeon General, et al. v. Missouri, et al.
- Docket no.: 23-411
- Citations: 603 U.S. 43 (more)
- Decision: Opinion

Case history
- Prior: Motion for preliminary injunction granted in part and denied in part, Missouri v. Biden, No. 22-cv-1213 (W.D. La., July 4, 2023); injunction affirmed in part, reversed in part, vacated in part, and modified in part, No. 23-30445 (5th Cir., October 3, 2023); injunction stayed and certiorari granted sub nom. Murthy v. Missouri, 601 U.S. ____ (October 20, 2023).

Questions presented
- (1) Whether respondents have Article III standing; (2) Whether the government's challenged conduct transformed private social-media companies' content-moderation decisions into state action and violated respondents' First Amendment rights; and (3) Whether the terms and breadth of the preliminary injunction are proper.

Holding
- Neither the individual nor the state plaintiffs have established Article III standing to seek an injunction against any defendant.

Court membership
- Chief Justice John Roberts Associate Justices Clarence Thomas · Samuel Alito; Sonia Sotomayor · Elena Kagan; Neil Gorsuch · Brett Kavanaugh; Amy Coney Barrett · Ketanji Brown Jackson

Case opinions
- Majority: Barrett, joined by Roberts, Sotomayor, Kagan, Kavanaugh, Jackson
- Dissent: Alito, joined by Thomas, Gorsuch

Murthy v. Missouri, 603 U.S. 43 (2024), originally filed as Missouri v. Biden, was a case in the Supreme Court of the United States involving the First Amendment, the federal government, and social media. The states of Missouri and Louisiana, led by Missouri's then Attorney General Eric Schmitt, filed suit against the U.S. government in the Western District of Louisiana. They claimed that the federal government pressured social media companies to censor conservative views and criticism of the Biden administration in violation of the right to freedom of expression. The government said it had only made requests, not demands, that social media operators remove misinformation.

On July 4, 2023, Judge Terry A. Doughty issued a preliminary injunction prohibiting several agencies and members of the Biden administration from contacting social media services to request the blocking or other moderation of content, with exceptions for material involving illegal activity. On appeal, the Fifth Circuit Court of Appeals found that there had been some coercion in the government's contact with social media companies in violation of the First Amendment, but significantly narrowed Doughty's injunction.

The U.S. Supreme Court initially stayed the Fifth Circuit's order, then granted review of the case by writ of certiorari. In oral arguments, the justices questioned whether the evidence substantiated claims of state coercion against social media companies. On June 26, 2024, the Court ruled 6–3 that the states lacked standing to sue because they failed to demonstrate substantial risk of redressable injury traceable to government action.

== Background ==
Since around 2020, then-Missouri Attorney General Eric Schmitt had been filing numerous lawsuits against the Biden administration, with a total of 26 suits as of October 2022. According to Schmitt's senate campaign website, these suits were filed to hold the Biden administration accountable, while Schmitt later said "The Attorney General's Office standing in between Missourians and a radical, overreaching government is a hallmark of federalism, and states have a vital duty to keep the federal government in check." Targets of Schmitt's lawsuits included the administration's policies on oil and gas production, Biden's planned debt forgiveness of student loans, and mask mandates during the COVID-19 pandemic. Missouri v. Biden was one of several high-profile lawsuits Missouri Attorney General Eric Schmitt filed against the Biden administration.

In 2022, Elon Musk bought Twitter and significantly altered the way it operated. He also selected specific independent journalists to release the "Twitter Files", a series of internal communications that Musk and the journalists assert show that parts of the U.S. government were working with Twitter to suppress free speech related to election fraud and misinformation about the pandemic. While legal analysts, speaking with The New York Times, believed that the steps Twitter took to moderate content after contact by the U.S. government were not censorship, many Republicans believed the Twitter Files proved their views were being censored. The Republican-controlled House of Representatives held a set of hearings in March 2023 about the Biden administration "weaponizing" social media for its own purposes. Schmitt (now a U.S. senator) and Louisiana Attorney General Jeff Landry (now the governor of Louisiana) were among those who testified before the committee with information from their case's discovery process, bringing their ongoing lawsuit greater public attention.

== Filing and depositions ==
The lawsuit alleges that President Joe Biden and his administration were "working with social media giants such as Meta, Twitter, and YouTube to censor and suppress free speech, including truthful information, related to COVID-19, election integrity, and other topics, under the guise of combating 'misinformation'." The lawsuit was co-filed with Louisiana's Attorney General Jeff Landry in May 2022 in the United States District Court for the Western District of Louisiana. Additional plaintiffs were added several months later, including Jim Hoft, owner of The Gateway Pundit, a conservative publication, and Jay Bhattacharya and Martin Kulldorff, academics who co-authored the Great Barrington Declaration, which questioned the government's handling of the COVID-19 pandemic.

The plaintiffs obtained subpoenas in October and November 2022 from former and current members of the Biden administration, including Anthony Fauci, who served as Chief Medical Advisor to the President, and White House Press Secretary Karine Jean-Pierre. The government attempted to block these deposition requests, but only a few such requests were granted. Fauci attended a deposition in November 2022 and said he favored spreading accurate information, which Schmitt claimed proved that social media censored content.

== Preliminary injunction ==
Hearings for the case were held in May 2023. Judge Doughty issued his ruling on July 4, 2023, issuing a preliminary injunction against several Biden administration officials from contacting social media services for "the purpose of urging, encouraging, pressuring, or inducing in any manner the removal, deletion, suppression, or reduction of content containing protected free speech." In his 155-page ruling, Doughty wrote: "The Plaintiffs are likely to succeed on the merits in establishing that the Government has used its power to silence the opposition. Opposition to COVID-19 vaccines; opposition to COVID-19 masking and lockdowns; opposition to the lab-leak theory of COVID-19; opposition to the validity of the 2020 election; statements that the Hunter Biden laptop story was true; and opposition to policies of the government officials in power. All were suppressed. It is quite telling that each example or category of suppressed speech was conservative in nature. This targeted suppression of conservative ideas is a perfect example of viewpoint discrimination of political speech. American citizens have the right to engage in free debate about the significant issues affecting the country." He continued: "If the allegations made by plaintiffs are true, the present case arguably involves the most massive attack against free speech in United States' history. The plaintiffs are likely to succeed on the merits in establishing that the government has used its power to silence the opposition."

Government agencies covered by the injunction included the Department of Justice, Department of Health and Human Services, State Department, the Centers for Disease Control and Prevention, and the Federal Bureau of Investigation. In addition to numerous social media companies, the injunction blocks the government from communicating with three academic programs at Stanford University and the University of Washington that study the spread of misinformation online: the Election Integrity Partnership, the Virality Project, and the Stanford Internet Observatory. The injunction allows for exceptions related to criminal activity and national threats.

The U.S. Department of Justice filed its intent to appeal to the United States Court of Appeals for the Fifth Circuit the next day. The Department of Justice sought a stay of Doughty's injunction, saying that it would prevent them from "working with social media companies on initiatives to prevent grave harm to the American people and our democratic processes" ahead of the 2024 elections. Legal experts, speaking to Reuters, said that while the case has merit, Doughty's preliminary injunction will face tough legal challenges on appeal. On July 14, 2023, the Fifth Circuit granted a temporary administrative stay of the injunction until further order.

=== Appellate decision ===
On September 8, 2023, the Fifth Circuit ruling upheld the district court ruling against the Biden administration but removed nine of Doughty's injunction's 10 provisions. The court found that some of the communications between the federal government and the social media companies to try to fight alleged COVID-19 misinformation "coerced or significantly encouraged social media platforms to moderate content", which violated the First Amendment. But the court also ruled that Doughty's preliminary injunction was too broad, as it blocked some legal social media content created by government and unlawfully restrained the First Amendment speech rights of the private academic institutions that were not government actors. It narrowed the injunction to prevent the government from taking "actions, formal or informal, directly or indirectly, to coerce or significantly encourage social-media companies to remove, delete, suppress, or reduce, including through altering their algorithms, posted social-media content containing protected free speech. That includes, but is not limited to, compelling the platforms to act, such as by intimating that some form of punishment will follow a failure to comply with any request, or supervising, directing, or otherwise meaningfully controlling the social-media companies' decision-making processes." The court placed enforcement of the injunction on hold for ten days to allow any appeals to be filed. Supreme Court Justice Samuel Alito granted a temporary stay of the order on September 14, 2023, lasting initially until September 23 and then extended to September 27, to give both parties the ability to argue further on the appeal. The Fifth Circuit Court of Appeals expanded the injunction issued in September to include the Cybersecurity and Infrastructure Security Agency (CISA), ruling that it used frequent interactions with social media platforms "to push them to adopt more restrictive policies on election-related speech".

== Supreme Court ==
In October 2023, the Supreme Court agreed to hear Murthy v. Missouri. The Court also lifted the injunctions set by the lower courts, allowing the federal government to continue to contact social media companies without restrictions while the case continued. Justices Samuel Alito, Clarence Thomas, and Neil Gorsuch dissented from the lifting of the injunctions, with Alito writing, "Government censorship of private speech is antithetical to our democratic form of government, and therefore today's decision is highly disturbing." The Court heard oral argument on March 18, 2024.

The Supreme Court issued its decision on June 26, 2024. The 6–3 majority determined that neither the states nor other respondents had standing under Article III, reversing the Fifth Circuit decision. Justice Amy Coney Barrett wrote the opinion, stating: "To establish standing, the plaintiffs must demonstrate a substantial risk that, in the near future, they will suffer an injury that is traceable to a government defendant and redressable by the injunction they seek. Because no plaintiff has carried that burden, none has standing to seek a preliminary injunction." Barrett cited a "dearth of facts" to support the claim that any action taken by the social media companies was a result of executive branch action for each of the plaintiffs, writing that in some cases there was no evidence that any government defendant had mentioned them at all.

Barrett also wrote that the Fifth Circuit's decision relied on a "clearly erroneous" reading of the evidentiary record by the District Court. She listed numerous examples in which Doughty had misframed routine communications as supposed "censorship requests". Other legal analysts noted the remarkable number of factual errors and fabricated quotations that had passed through the district court and Fifth Circuit and made it to the Supreme Court, some of which were raised and clarified in oral argument.

=== Dissent ===
Justice Alito wrote the dissent, joined by Thomas and Gorsuch. He wrote that this was "one of the most important free speech cases to reach this Court in years", that the respondents had brought enough evidence to suggest the government's actions were unconstitutional, but that the Court "shirks that duty and thus permits the successful campaign of coercion in this case to stand as an attractive model for future officials who want to control what the people say, hear, and think. That is regrettable."

== Aftermath ==
The decision attracted both support and criticism. Some commentators praised the Court's decision to reverse the Fifth Circuit, claiming the case was a politically motivated effort by conservative activists. Others agreed with the Court's opinion but were disappointed that the Court did not use the opportunity to articulate a clear standard for government coercion and free expression. Many libertarian and conservative commentators called the ruling a threat to Americans' speech rights.

On January 20, 2025, the first day of his second term as president, Donald Trump signed the Restoring Freedom of Speech and Ending Federal Censorship executive order. A response to actions the government allegedly took under Biden that were central to the case, the order would prevent the federal government from interfering with any protected free speech unless the administration approved.

In March 2026, the Trump administration and the states reached a settlement that would block the U.S. Surgeon General, the Centers for Disease Control and Prevention (CDC), and the Cybersecurity and Infrastructure Security Agency (CISA) from threatening or coercing platforms with regulatory action to influence content moderation decisions for ten years.

== See also ==
- Uzuegbunam v. Preczewski, 592 U.S. 279 (2021), a case which allowed nominal damages for a claim that would have otherwise been moot
