= Thornell v. Jones =

- Supreme Court of the United States

Decided May 30, 2024
- Full case name: Thornell v. Jones
- Docket no.: 22-982
- Citations: 602 U.S. 154 (more)

Holding
- The Ninth Circuit interpreted and applied Strickland v. Washington incorrectly. Reversed. Death sentence reinstated.

Court membership
- Chief Justice John Roberts Associate Justices Clarence Thomas · Samuel Alito; Sonia Sotomayor · Elena Kagan; Neil Gorsuch · Brett Kavanaugh; Amy Coney Barrett · Ketanji Brown Jackson

Case opinions
- Majority: Alito, joined by Roberts, Thomas, Gorsuch, Kavanaugh, Barrett
- Dissent: Sotomayor, joined by Kagan
- Dissent: Jackson

Thornell v. Jones, 602 U.S. 154 (2024), was a United States Supreme Court case in which the Court held that the Ninth Circuit Court of Appeals interpreted and applied Strickland v. Washington incorrectly. The Ninth Circuit's decision was reversed, and the death sentence was reinstated. Alito said that the Ninth Circuit's characterizations of the mitigating and aggravating factors were misleading, emphasizing the former and downplaying the latter inappropriately.

In dissent, Sotomayor agreed that the Ninth Circuit had "all but ignored" the aggravating factors, but she thought the Ninth Circuit was in a better position to decide this matter than the Supreme Court.
