= Alexander v. South Carolina State Conference of the NAACP =

United States Supreme Court case

Alexander v. South Carolina NAACP
- Supreme Court of the United States

Argued October 11, 2023 Decided May 23, 2024
- Full case name: Thomas C. Alexander, in His Official Capacity as President of the South Carolina Senate, et al., v. The South Carolina State Conference of the NAACP, et al.
- Docket no.: 22-807
- Citations: 602 U.S. 1 (more)

Questions presented
- (1) Whether courts must apply a presumption of good faith to a legislature's racial intent when considering a challenge to legislative districts; (2) whether courts must disentangle race from politics when considering such challenges; (3) whether courts must consider a district's compliance with traditional districting principles before finding that the legislature predominantly considered race when drawing districts.

Holding
- The District Court’s finding that race predominated in the design of District I in the Enacted Plan was clearly erroneous.

Court membership
- Chief Justice John Roberts Associate Justices Clarence Thomas · Samuel Alito; Sonia Sotomayor · Elena Kagan; Neil Gorsuch · Brett Kavanaugh; Amy Coney Barrett · Ketanji Brown Jackson

Case opinions
- Majority: Alito, joined by Roberts, Gorsuch, Kavanaugh, Barrett; Thomas (except part III-C)
- Concurrence: Thomas (in part)
- Dissent: Kagan, joined by Sotomayor, Jackson

Laws applied
- U.S. Const. amends. XIV, XV

Alexander v. South Carolina State Conference of the NAACP, 602 U.S. 1 (2024), was a United States Supreme Court case regarding racial gerrymandering and partisan gerrymandering within South Carolina's 1st congressional district, which includes most of Charleston.

Redistricting maps were drawn by the Republican-led legislature purportedly to increase Republican representation within the district, but had the impact of moving African-American voters out of the district. The local chapter of the NAACP sued, claiming the map was racially gerrymandered and unconstitutional. The three-judge district court ruled in favor of the NAACP, and South Carolina appealed the case directly to the Supreme Court. The Supreme Court ruled 6–3 that the finding of the district court that race had predominated in the legislature's decision was not sufficiently supported by evidence, reversing that finding as clear error and remanding the case to the district court for further consideration.

It was the first partisan gerrymandering case taken by the Supreme Court after its landmark decision in Rucho v. Common Cause (2019) which stated that partisan gerrymandering claims present political questions beyond the reach of the federal courts, and the first racial gerrymandering case after the court's decision in Allen v. Milligan (2023).

== Background ==
Before the 2020 United States census, South Carolina's 1st Congressional District was seen as a swing district, being won by Democrat Joe Cunningham in an upset against Republican Katie Arrington in 2018 and then incumbent Republican representative Nancy Mace in 2020, both times by small margins, and between 1 and 1.5 percentage points between the winner and runner-up.

After the 2020 United States census had been conducted, the South Carolina Legislature had enacted a new map, which was signed by South Carolina Governor Henry McMaster, in January 2022. The new congressional map changed the partisan and racial makeup of the 1st Congressional District by splitting Charleston County, in two, putting the cities of Charleston and North Charleston, into the Democratic heavy 6th Congressional district, with the intention of moving Black Democratic voters into the 6th District, while the rest of Charleston county was redistricted into the 1st Congressional district, leaving White Democratic voters in the 1st District, making it more Republican, as opposed to a swing district prior to redistricting. The desired effect of this redistricting was seen in 2022, when Mace won reelection by almost 14 percentage points. Multiple plaintiffs, including the South Carolina ACLU, and South Carolina NAACP, sued the stating that the congressional map was an unconstitutional racial gerrymander, in violation of the Equal Protection Clause of the Fourteenth Amendment to the United States Constitution, as well as the Fifteenth Amendment. In response to the lawsuit, the defendants, instead asserted that the move to exclude black voters, specifically voters from Charleston County, from the 1st District, and leaving white voters in the district, was done as a partisan gerrymander, as opposed to a racial gerrymander.

== Lower-court decision ==
At the United States District Court for the District of South Carolina, arguments were held regarding the racial makeup of the 1st, 2nd and 5th districts. The plaintiffs asserted that the predominant factor in the adoption of the current district maps was race for all three districts, while the defendants asserted that party affiliation was the main factor during the redistricting process of all 3 districts. On January 6, 2023, a three judge panel unanimously ruled using the predominance standard set forth in the 1995 United States Supreme Court case, Miller v. Johnson, that race was the predominant factor when drawing the current shape of the 1st district, specifically, a racial target of 17% of the population of the 1st district being black, to make the district Republican leaning, however, the panel also ruled that while race was a motivating factor in the drawing of the 2nd and 5th districts, it was not the predominant factor, leaving the shapes of the 2nd and 5th districts intact. while it was a partial legal win for the plaintiffs, the defendants still contended that the actual goal of their redistricting process was a partisan one, with party affiliation being the predominant factor in the redistricting of the 1st district as opposed to race. The court ordered the defendants to draw a new map by March 31, 2023, however the plaintiffs appealed to the Supreme Court on January 27, 2023, and the district court extending the deadline to 30 days after the Supreme Court issued a decision. On May 15, 2023, the Supreme Court agreed to hear the case with oral arguments set for October 11, 2023.

== Supreme Court ==
On May 15, 2023, the Supreme Court accepted the case, noting probable jurisdiction. The case is notable for simultaneously being the first case about partisan gerrymandering case after Rucho v. Common Cause (2019) and the first racial gerrymandering case after Allen v. Milligan (2023). In Rucho, the Supreme Court held that, even if partisan gerrymandering violates the Constitution, it presents political questions beyond the federal court system to decide. However, state courts could still decide partisan gerrymandering claims under state constitutional guarantees, as the court affirmed in Moore v. Harper (2023).

Fourteen amicus briefs were filed by various organizations and individuals for consideration by the Supreme Court.

At oral arguments on October 11, 2023, legal experts and news outlets agreed that the Supreme Court seemed sympathetic to the arguments presented by the defendants in the case. Ian Millhiser, a legal journalist for Vox, stated that a ruling for the defendants could make gerrymandering worse and make it "virtually impossible to challenge racial gerrymanders."

The Supreme Court made its decision in the case on May 23, 2024, reversing the district court's ruling that the redistricting map was racially gerrymandered, though remanded the case to rehear other claims brought by the defendants. This decision allows the state to use the maps as drawn up before the challenge. The majority opinion in the 6–3 case, decided along the Court's ideological lines, was authored by Justice Samuel Alito. Alito's opinion determined that the defendants had not shown sufficient evidence to demonstrate that the state legislature had used racial factors to determine the new map; instead, because their goals had been to affect partisan leanings within the Charleston district, the court system does not have jurisdiction on such matters. Alito stated that when a court "finds that race drove a legislature's districting decisions, it is declaring that the legislature engaged in 'offensive and demeaning' conduct that 'bears an uncomfortable resemblance to political apartheid.' We should not be quick to hurl such accusations at the political branches."

Justice Elena Kagan wrote the dissent, joined by Justices Sotomayor and Jackson, stating "It is to respect the plausible — no, the more than plausible — findings of the district court that the state engaged in race-based districting. And to tell the state that it must redraw [the district] this time without targeting African-American citizens."

Justice Clarence Thomas wrote a concurrence that went further than the majority and argued that federal courts do not have authority to order new legislative maps even for valid claims of racial gerrymandering. In response to massive resistance to the 1954 landmark decision in Brown v. Board of Education that declared segregation of public schools unconstitutional, the Supreme Court's 1955 remedial decision in Brown II took, Thomas said, "a boundless view of equitable remedies, describing equity as being 'characterized by a practical flexibility in shaping its remedies and by a facility for adjusting and reconciling public and private needs[]'". Thomas argued that "[t]hat understanding may have justified temporary measures to 'overcome the widespread resistance to the dictates of the Constitution' prevalent at that time, but, as a general matter, 'such extravagant uses of judicial power are at odds with the history and tradition of the equity power and the Framers' design.'" This stance was heavily criticized by journalists that believed that Thomas was seeking to enforce a race-blind Constitution and end further challenges of racial gerrymandering by the courts.

A subsequent law review article published by Barry Law School argued that a presumption of legislative good faith in congressional redistricting that is substantive lacks any constitutional, doctrinal, or historical basis, and that even if there was, it would be vested in Congress rather than state legislatures because of the structure, context, and purpose of the Reconstruction Amendments. Making similar arguments, a law review article accepted by the University of Illinois Law Review argues that Alexander was wrongly decided.

== See also ==
- 2020 United States redistricting cycle
- United States congressional apportionment
- South Carolina's congressional districts
- South Carolina's 1st congressional district
