= Chiaverini v. City of Napoleon =

- Supreme Court of the United States

Argued April 15, 2024 Decided Jun 20, 2024
- Full case name: Chiaverini v. City of Napoleon
- Docket no.: 23-50
- Citations: 602 U.S. 556 (more)

Holding
- Probable cause for one charge does not necessarily imply probable cause for all other charges.

Court membership
- Chief Justice John Roberts Associate Justices Clarence Thomas · Samuel Alito; Sonia Sotomayor · Elena Kagan; Neil Gorsuch · Brett Kavanaugh; Amy Coney Barrett · Ketanji Brown Jackson

Case opinions
- Majority: Kagan, joined by Roberts, Sotamayor, Kavanaugh, Barrett, Jackson
- Dissent: Thomas, joined by Alito
- Dissent: Gorsuch

Chiaverini v. City of Napoleon, 602 U.S. 556 (2024), is a United States Supreme Court case addressing whether the presence of probable cause for one criminal charge bars a Fourth Amendment “malicious-prosecution” claim (brought under 42 U.S.C. § 1983) attacking a different charge in the same proceeding. In a 6–3 opinion by Justice Kagan, the Court held that probable cause for one charge does not categorically defeat a claim that another contemporaneous charge lacked probable cause and caused a seizure. The Court vacated the Sixth Circuit’s contrary rule and remanded for further proceedings, including consideration of causation.
