= Rudisill v. McDonough =

- Supreme Court of the United States

Decided April 16, 2024
- Full case name: Rudisill v. McDonough
- Docket no.: 22-888
- Citations: 601 U.S. 294 (more)

Holding
- Military veterans who accrue educational benefits under both the Montgomery and Post-9/11 GI Bills may use either one and may use them in any order.

Court membership
- Chief Justice John Roberts Associate Justices Clarence Thomas · Samuel Alito; Sonia Sotomayor · Elena Kagan; Neil Gorsuch · Brett Kavanaugh; Amy Coney Barrett · Ketanji Brown Jackson

Case opinions
- Majority: Jackson, joined by Roberts, Sotomayor, Kagan, Gorsuch, Kavanaugh, Barrett
- Concurrence: Kavanaugh, joined by Barrett
- Dissent: Thomas, joined by Alito

Laws applied
- G.I. Bill

Rudisill v. McDonough, 601 U.S. 294 (2024), was a United States Supreme Court case in which the Court held that veterans who accrue educational benefits under both the Montgomery and Post-9/11 GI Bills may use either or both, and may use them in any order.

== Subsequent cases ==
In Perkins v. Collins, 24-6515 Vet. App. (2025), the Department of Veterans Affairs argued that the two "qualifying periods of service" that made a veteran eligible to use both respective GI Bill needed to fall under separate enlistments. The United States Court of Appeals for Veteran Claims ruled that the Rudisill decision was not rooted in distinct periods of service, but in total length of service. The Perkins ruling held that veterans who serve six years on active duty -- 3 years to qualify for the Montgomery GI Bill and 3 years to qualify for the Post-9/11 GI Bill -- can claim both, in either order, for up to 48 total months of benefits.
