= Moyle v. United States =

2024 U.S. Supreme Court case on abortion

Moyle v. United States Idaho v. United States
- Supreme Court of the United States

Argued April 24, 2024 Decided June 27, 2024
- Full case name: Mike Moyle, Speaker of the Idaho House of Representatives, et al. v. United States; State of Idaho v. United States
- Docket nos.: 23-726; 23-727
- Argument: Oral argument
- Decision: Opinion

Case history
- Prior: Preliminary injunction issued (D. Idaho Aug. 24, 2022); stay pending appeal granted (9th Cir. Sep. 28, 2023); stay vacated (9th Cir. Oct. 10, 2023); stay granted and certiorari before judgment granted (Jan. 5, 2024)

Questions presented
- Whether EMTALA preempts state laws like Idaho's abortion ban that prohibit physicians from providing abortions in emergency situations.

Holding
- The writs of certiorari before judgment are dismissed as improvidently granted, and the stays entered by the Court on January 5, 2024, are vacated.

Court membership
- Chief Justice John Roberts Associate Justices Clarence Thomas · Samuel Alito; Sonia Sotomayor · Elena Kagan; Neil Gorsuch · Brett Kavanaugh; Amy Coney Barrett · Ketanji Brown Jackson

Case opinions
- Per curiam
- Concurrence: Kagan, joined by Sotomayor; Jackson (Part II)
- Concurrence: Barrett, joined by Roberts, Kavanaugh
- Concur/dissent: Jackson
- Dissent: Alito, joined by Thomas; Gorsuch (Parts I and II)

Moyle v. United States, 603 U.S. 324 (2024), was a United States Supreme Court case about whether an Idaho abortion law conflicted with the federal Emergency Medical Treatment and Labor Act (EMTALA). The court initially agreed to expedite the appeal and temporarily allowed Idaho to enforce its abortion ban. After hearing the case, the court dismissed it as improvidently granted and restored a lower court order allowing emergency abortions under EMTALA. This returned the case to the lower courts without a ruling on the merits.

== Background ==
In 2020, the Idaho Legislature enacted a law criminalizing most abortions. The ban, Idaho Code 18-622, was a trigger law which would only take effect if the U.S. Supreme Court overturned the constitutional right to abortion it had announced in Roe v. Wade (1973). The Supreme Court did so in Dobbs v. Jackson Women's Health Organization, decided in June 2022, and Idaho's law was scheduled to take effect on August 25, 2022.

The Biden administration filed a lawsuit in federal district court in Idaho, arguing that the state law conflicted with the federal Emergency Medical Treatment and Labor Act (EMTALA). EMTALA requires hospitals receiving Medicare funds to provide "necessary stabilizing treatment" for an "emergency medical condition". According to the administration, and guidance it issued in July 2022 through the Department of Health and Human Services (HHS), EMTALA preempts state law that would prohibit such treatment. They argued that abortions were necessary in certain emergency situations not allowed by Idaho law, which only provides exceptions when "necessary to prevent the death of the pregnant woman", rape or incest, or an ectopic or molar pregnancy.

District judge B. Lynn Winmill agreed with the U.S. government, granting a preliminary injunction on August 24, 2022. In September 2023, a three-judge panel of the U.S. Court of Appeals for the Ninth Circuit granted a stay pending appeal, but the full court vacated the stay less than two weeks later.

== Supreme Court ==
An unformatted copy of the decision was mistakenly uploaded by the Supreme Court for a brief amount of time.

The full Circuit Court's order was challenged in the Supreme Court by both the state itself and the Idaho legislature through an emergency petition, led by Mike Moyle, the Speaker of the Idaho House of Representatives. In January 2024, the Supreme Court temporarily allowed Idaho to enforce its abortion ban, and agreed to review both petitions (consolidated under the Moyle v. United States case) on an expedited basis by granting certiorari before judgment. The Supreme Court's action occurred days after the Fifth Circuit ruled in favor of Texas' similar law against abortions under medical emergencies, citing that the HHS had overstepped its authority in requiring these abortions to take place under EMTALA. CNN reported in July 2024 that the Supreme Court's initial order was made by a 6–3 vote, with Jackson, Sotomayor, and Kagan dissenting.

Between this order and the case's oral arguments, some members of the Supreme Court saw flaws with the case, according to CNN. The situation in Idaho hospitals had become an issue, with some female patients with pregnancy complications having to be air-lifted to out-of-state hospitals for life-saving treatment to avoid breaking Idaho law. There were also concerns that the arguments put forth by the state defending its ban lacked the robustness that the court had initially seen in them, concerns that the federal government had put forth in their own briefs.

Oral arguments were held on April 24, 2024. Joshua Turner represented Moyle and Idaho, while U.S. Solicitor General Elizabeth Prelogar represented the federal government. By this point, according to CNN, three of the conservative members of the court who had voted for the original order, Roberts, Kavanaugh, and Barrett, appeared to have broken away from the other conservatives to question if the Court had involved itself in the case too early, evidenced by the directions of questions during the oral arguments. CNN stated that after the oral arguments, Roberts worked with Kavanaugh, Barrett, and the three liberal justices to write a draft order to remove their January order and send the case back to lower courts, declaring that the previous grant of certiorari as a "miscalculation" and "a misunderstanding of the dueling parties' claims".

On June 26, the Supreme Court briefly posted and removed a draft of the decision on its website. The Court's press office said that "the Court's Publications Unit inadvertently and briefly uploaded a document to the Court's website."

The Court issued its per curiam opinion on June 27, 2024, dismissing its earlier decision to hear the case by certiorari before judgment as improvidently granted. The Court restored the lower-court order enjoining Idaho not to prevent hospitals from providing emergency abortions to protect against serious harm to the health of the mother.

=== Concurrences and dissents ===
All nine justices wrote or joined separate opinions.

Justice Kagan wrote a concurring opinion, joined by Sotomayor and in part by Jackson. In Kagan's view, the Court never should have granted certiorari before judgment or a stay of the district court's order. She argued that Idaho law is preempted by federal law when "continuing a pregnancy does not put a woman's life in danger, but still places her at risk of grave health consequences, including loss of fertility".

In Justice Barrett's concurrence, joined by Roberts and Kavanaugh, she agreed that dismissing the case now was correct as new developments in the case had made it better to send the case back to the lower courts. Briefing and argument had shown that the extent of the parties' dispute was unclear, evolving, and narrower than it initially seemed. For example, the U.S. government told the Court that mental health conditions never require abortions as stabilizing care, while Idaho told the Court that abortions are permitted in all the medical conditions that the U.S. government had identified, even when the woman is not at "imminent" risk of death. Based on concessions like these, Barrett concluded that "even with the preliminary injunction in place, Idaho's ability to enforce its law remains almost entirely intact" – not enough to show that Idaho would be irreparably harmed.

Justice Jackson agreed with the court's decision to allow emergency abortions by vacating the stay, but disagreed with the decision to dismiss as improvidently granted, which she saw as unnecessary and harmful delay. She would have ruled on the merits, in favor of the U.S. government.

Justice Alito dissented, joined by Thomas and in part by Gorsuch, saying that the court should have decided the case on the merits now, in favor of Idaho. Alito focused on several parts of EMTALA that use the term "unborn child" to argue that it does not require abortions. He also argued that EMTALA's nature as Spending Clause legislation implies that it does not bind Idaho or preempt Idaho's criminal law.

== Aftermath ==
The case was reheard by the Ninth Circuit in December 2024. With Donald Trump's second term in January 2025, the Justice Department filed to drop the lawsuit in March 2025. However, ahead of this, St. Luke's, the largest hospital system in Idaho, filed a separate challenge to the state law, and had obtained a similar injunction to allow hospitals to provide emergency abortion services under the federal requirement.
