= Trump v. United States =

2024 U.S. Supreme Court decision on presidential immunity

- Supreme Court of the United States

Argued April 25, 2024 Decided July 1, 2024
- Full case name: Donald J. Trump, Petitioner v. United States
- Docket no.: 23-939
- Citations: 603 U.S. 593 (more)
- Argument: Oral argument
- Decision: Opinion

Case history
- Prior: Memorandum opinion denying immunity, United States v. Trump, 704 F.Supp.3d 196 (D.D.C. 2023).; Certiorari before judgment denied. 144 S.Ct. 539 (2023).; Denial of immunity affirmed. 91 F.4th 1173 (D.C. Cir. 2024).; Certiorari granted 144 S.Ct. 1027 (2024).

Questions presented
- Whether and if so to what extent does a former President enjoy presidential immunity from criminal prosecution for conduct alleged to involve official acts during his tenure in office.

Holding
- Under our constitutional structure of separated powers, the nature of Presidential power entitles a former President to absolute immunity from criminal prosecution for actions within his conclusive and preclusive constitutional authority. And he is entitled to at least presumptive immunity from prosecution for all his official acts. There is no immunity for unofficial acts.

Court membership
- Chief Justice John Roberts Associate Justices Clarence Thomas · Samuel Alito; Sonia Sotomayor · Elena Kagan; Neil Gorsuch · Brett Kavanaugh; Amy Coney Barrett · Ketanji Brown Jackson

Case opinions
- Majority: Roberts, joined by Thomas, Alito, Gorsuch, Kavanaugh; Barrett (except Part III–C)
- Concurrence: Thomas
- Concurrence: Barrett (in part)
- Dissent: Sotomayor, joined by Kagan, Jackson
- Dissent: Jackson

Laws applied
- U.S. Const. art. II

Trump v. United States, 603 U.S. 593 (2024), is a landmark decision of the Supreme Court of the United States holding that presidential immunity from criminal prosecution presumptively extends to all of a president's "official acts" – with absolute immunity for official acts within an exclusive presidential authority that Congress cannot regulate such as the pardon, command of the military, execution of laws, or control of the executive branch. Trump is a federal case that was ultimately dismissed by federal district court judge Tanya Chutkan, following Trump's 2024 election. Trump's counsel filed a motion to dismiss the case, citing the Department of Justice's policy not to prosecute sitting presidents. This case would have determined whether then-president Donald Trump and others engaged in election interference during the 2020 election, including events during the January 6, 2021, attack on the U.S. Capitol. It is the first time a case concerning criminal prosecution for alleged official acts of a president was brought before the Supreme Court.

On July 1, 2024, the Court ruled in a 6–3 decision that presidents have absolute immunity for acts committed as president within their core constitutional purview, at least presumptive immunity for official acts within the outer perimeter of their official responsibility, and no immunity for unofficial acts. The court declined to rule on the scope of immunity for some acts alleged of Trump in his indictment, instead vacating the appellate decision and remanding the case to the district court for further proceedings.

The decision was widely criticized as anti-democratic by legal experts and historians, as well as Democratic politicians, some of whom introduced constitutional amendments to undo the ruling. In a scathing dissent calling the majority's reasoning "utterly indefensible", Justice Sonia Sotomayor wrote that "The relationship between the President and the people he serves has shifted irrevocably. In every use of official power, the President is now a king above the law."

== Background ==
In Nixon v. Fitzgerald (1982), the United States Supreme Court held that the president is immune from civil suit for money damages in regard to official acts. The Court clarified in Clinton v. Jones (1997) that the president is liable for civil damages for actions committed prior to assuming the presidency. The Supreme Court cases United States v. Nixon (1974) and Trump v. Vance (2020) limit the president's privilege within the judicial process.

Three separate civil lawsuits (later consolidated in Lee v. Trump) against Donald Trump filed by several members of Congress and Capitol police officers sought damages for Trump's actions from the U.S. Capitol attack on January 6, 2021. Trump asserted presidential immunity for that case. In February 2022, District Court for the District of Columbia judge Amit Mehta rejected former president Trump's claims of immunity in reference to the Capitol attack, allowing the civil trials to proceed.

The U.S. Court of Appeals for the District of Columbia Circuit upheld Mehta's opinion in a unanimous decision in December 2023, stating that because his January 6 speech was a campaign event, he had acted "as office-seeker, not office-holder", and his actions did not fall within the "outer perimeter" standard for presidential immunity established in Nixon v. Fitzgerald (1982). The ruling allowed Trump to argue the immunity question later in the civil trial. Trump opted not to appeal this decision to the Supreme Court.

By March 2022, the U.S. Department of Justice began an investigation into Trump's actions from the general election in November 2020 and during the U.S. Capitol attack. Attorney General Merrick Garland appointed Jack Smith as special counsel to oversee the investigation into Trump in both the January 6 events and the handling of classified documents after his presidency.

== Lower court history ==
=== District court ===
A grand jury indicted Trump on four charges released on August 1, 2023. On October 5, 2023, Trump's attorneys filed a motion in the federal prosecution case to dismiss the indictment, citing presidential immunity under Nixon v. Fitzgerald.

Defense attorney John Lauro argued that Trump's claims of electoral irregularities and voter fraud were "efforts to ensure election integrity", a responsibility of the president. According to Lauro, Trump's attempts to validate his claims through the Department of Justice and the fake electors plot cannot be criminally prosecuted as "official duties" as president. Federal prosecutors asserted that Trump's claims of presidential immunity were not supported by the Constitution or legal precedent.

On December 1, judge Tanya Chutkan rejected the October 5 motion to dismiss under presidential immunity and the October 23 motion to dismiss under the Freedom of Speech Clause, the Double Jeopardy Clause, and the Due Process Clause.

=== Appeals court ===
On December 7, Trump filed notice that he planned to appeal Chutkan's ruling to the U.S. Court of Appeals for the District of Columbia Circuit, and moved to pause the case pending the appeal.

An appeals court was due to hear the immunity dispute. On December 11, the special counsel petitioned the U.S. Supreme Court to skip the appeals court and resolve the immunity dispute on an expedited basis. The rare step was an effort to keep the trial on schedule. Within hours, the Supreme Court said it would consider whether to accept the case on an expedited timeline. On December 13, Chutkan paused all deadlines in the case, including the upcoming trial itself, so the immunity dispute could be resolved first. The gag order remained in effect. On December 20, Trump's deadline to file a response with the Supreme Court, his lawyers complained that the special counsel was asking to "bypass ... ordinary procedures ...and rush to decide the issues with reckless abandon". Trump's team asked the Supreme Court to reject the expedited timeline and allow the appeals court to consider the case first. On December 22, the Supreme Court denied the special counsel's request, leaving the case to the appeals court.

On January 9, 2024, the D.C. Court of Appeals heard arguments in the immunity dispute. The three-judge panel included J. Michelle Childs, Florence Y. Pan, and Karen L. Henderson. Trump attended the hearing in person and was represented by lawyer John Sauer. In response to a hypothetical question posed by Judge Pan about whether a U.S. president could order SEAL Team Six to assassinate a political rival, Sauer argued that unless the president were subsequently impeached and convicted for said unlawful order, the president could not be criminally prosecuted. Judge Pan pointed out that if there is any circumstance in which a president can be criminally prosecuted (in this hypothetical, after being convicted by the Senate), then the president's immunity is not absolute. Judge Henderson added: "I think it's paradoxical to say that [Trump's] constitutional duty to 'take care that the laws be faithfully executed' allows him to violate criminal laws."

On February 6, the Circuit Court of Appeals panel unanimously affirmed the District Court ruling, concluding that Trump's alleged actions "lacked any lawful discretionary authority ... and he is answerable in court for his conduct" because "former President Trump has become citizen Trump ... [and] any executive immunity that may have protected him while he served as President no longer protects him against this prosecution". The panel held further that former presidents have no immunity for "allegedly violat[ing] generally applicable criminal laws" while in office, and specifically "to commit crimes that would neutralize the most fundamental check on executive power – the recognition and implementation of election results". The panel noted that while "the separation of powers doctrine may immunize lawful discretionary acts… [it] does not bar the federal criminal prosecution of a former President for every official act", and that absolute presidential immunity "would collapse our system of separated powers by placing the President beyond the reach of all three Branches". The panel concluded that "We cannot accept that the office of the Presidency places its former occupants above the law for all time thereafter."

== United States Supreme Court ==
On February 12, 2024, Trump appealed to the U.S. Supreme Court to request a stay of the 2020 election interference trial while he sought an en banc hearing from the D.C. Circuit Court. In response, Smith filed his own brief on February 14, 2024, urging the Supreme Court to deny Trump's request and citing the urgency of the pending 2024 presidential election. Smith also requested that if the Supreme Court took the case, to treat Trump's request as a petition for writ of certiorari, and put the case on an expedited schedule.

On February 28, 2024, the Supreme Court agreed to hear the case, later setting arguments for April 25. The court also maintained the stay of the trial until their decision was made.

On March 19, Trump's lawyers filed a 67-page brief arguing that a president would have to be impeached by the House and convicted by the Senate before they could be prosecuted for any crime. In 2000, the Office of Legal Counsel issued an opinion that concluded that it is constitutional to indict and try a former president for the same offenses for which the President was impeached by the House of Representatives and acquitted by the Senate.

On April 8, special counsel Jack Smith filed a 66-page brief urging the Supreme Court to reject Trump's claim of immunity from prosecution for allegedly conspiring to overturn the 2020 election results. Trump's legal team argued for protecting presidential actions from prosecution to maintain authority, while Smith emphasized accountability for alleged crimes.

=== Oral arguments ===
Oral arguments were held on April 25, 2024.

Trump's attorney D. John Sauer argued that the President has absolute immunity from prosecution for all official acts unless successfully impeached and convicted by Congress before prosecution. Michael Dreeben, representing the special counsel, argued that there are appropriate safeguards to assure that a president could not be prosecuted for most acts done while in their official capacity. One notable controversy which occurred during oral arguments was a response Trump attorney John Sauer made to Sonia Sotomayor which argued Presidents can, among other things, kill political rivals with immunity.

Trump attorneys cited Nixon v. Fitzgerald to support Trump's argument, while Smith attorneys cited United States v. Nixon, the 1974 unanimous Supreme Court decision rejecting Nixon's claim of "absolute, unqualified Presidential privilege of immunity from judicial process under all circumstances". Smith attorneys argued the Fitzgerald precedent, which found presidents enjoy absolute immunity from civil suits, does not apply to federal criminal prosecutions.

Journalists observing the arguments reported that the court rejected Trump's claim of having complete absolute immunity, with some line drawn between public acts performed as presidential duties and covered by immunity, and private acts that would not be. At the same time, the conservative justices appeared to believe it necessary to review whether the specific indictments against Trump fell into public or private actions, and that sending the case back to lower courts to make this determination prior to the jury trial would be an appropriate action, which may make it less likely for the trial to occur prior to the 2024 presidential election. Such a determination would likely require the case to be returned to judge Chutkan to distinguish between official and private acts. The New York Times reported there appeared to be consensus among the justices that the prosecution could proceed, though the Chutkan proceedings might delay the trial until after the November 2024 elections. The justices also signaled that their ruling might require some allegations to be stripped from the indictment, a process with lower courts that could take several months, though Justice Barrett suggested it might be expedited if Smith did it himself.

=== Opinion of the Court ===
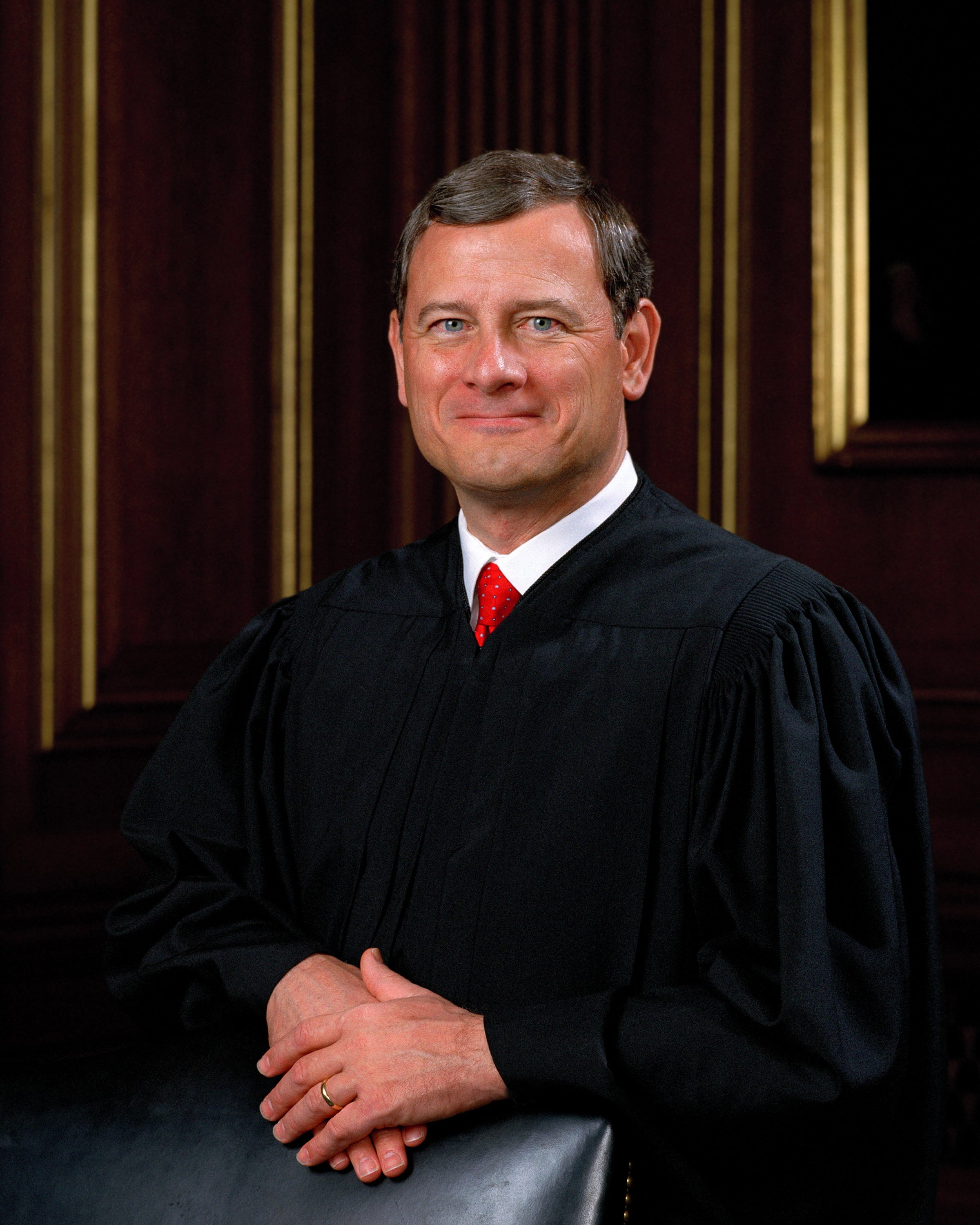
Chief Justice John Roberts delivered the opinion of the Court.

Syllabus summarizing the opinion of the Court

On July 1, 2024, the Supreme Court issued a 6–3 decision vacating the decision from the Court of Appeals and holding that presidents had immunity from criminal prosecution for acts conducted under their core constitutional authority as president and presumptive immunity for all official acts, but did not have immunity for any private acts.

Chief Justice John Roberts wrote the majority opinion, holding that presidents "may not be prosecuted for exercising [] core constitutional powers", the "powers invested exclusively in him by the Constitution". These include commanding the military. "While Congress cannot deprive the President of the command of the army and navy, only Congress can provide him an army or navy to command." By the Constitution of the United States, the President alone "shall have Power to grant Reprieves and Pardons for Offences against the United States, except in Cases of Impeachment." Roberts noted that the President has exclusive "foreign relations responsibilities". "It was intimated that the President might act in external affairs without congressional authority, but not that he might act contrary to an Act of Congress." As the President is ultimately responsible for the execution of laws, when he delegates executive power to his appointed officers, he cannot be criminalized for his management of those officers. Roberts explained that neither Congress nor the courts have authority to limit powers exclusively granted to the President under the Constitution and delineated the scope of absolute immunity when the president's acts fell outside of his core constitutional powers, writing that absolute immunity did not extend to "conduct in areas where his authority is shared with Congress". Roberts wrote that other official acts, described as conduct taken in accordance with the president's "constitutional and statutory authority", are granted presumptive immunity but may be prosecuted, provided that prosecutors demonstrate that such charges would not threaten the power and function of the executive branch. The court found that official acts included conduct within the outer perimeter of the president's official responsibilities that is "not manifestly or palpably beyond [his] authority." Courts determining whether acts are official are precluded from examining the motives behind the act or designating an act as unofficial simply due to its alleged violation of the law. Unofficial acts would not enjoy any immunity from criminal prosecution. Testimony and records of the President or his advisors pertaining to official acts that are determined to be immune from prosecution would also be excluded from introduction as evidence in the prosecution of other acts. Roberts stated that the presumptive immunity applied to all presidents and "occupants of the Oval Office". The court rejected Trump's argument that impeachment and removal from office is a necessary prerequisite to criminally charge a president.

In crafting the ruling, the majority stated that while the framers of the Constitution supported a powerful presidency, there was fragmentary evidence about presidential immunity in particular. Thus, the court relied on separation of powers principles and precedential cases to reach a ruling. The majority opinion cited Nixon v. Fitzgerald and United States v. Nixon as particular precedents to develop its standard of presidential immunity. It cited the court's findings in US v. Nixon of a public interest in "candid, objective, and even blunt or harsh opinions in Presidential decisionmaking" in finding presumptive privilege for presidential communications, as well as Fitzgerald's findings about the necessity of preventing "diversion of the President's attention during the decisionmaking process" by potential civil liability. These precedents were used to support the finding that it was necessary to prevent the president from being constrained by undue threats of criminal prosecution in order to undertake the "bold and unhesitating action" required to effectively execute the duties of the office. Roberts weighed this against the additional public interest of "fair and effective" enforcement of criminal laws to come to a conclusion on the appropriate scope of presidential immunity.

The court declined to dismiss the indictment against Trump. The court found that some specific alleged acts were clearly immune from prosecution and others required an analysis of the facts. The majority ruled that Trump's alleged efforts to leverage the Department of Justice in producing alternate slates of electors could not be prosecuted, while remanding decisions on immunity related to Trump's alleged pressuring of the Vice President, state officials, and private individuals to the district court. The court also directed the district court to examine the scope of evidence that could be utilized in the charges against Trump, such as his public comments.

==== Concurrences and dissents ====
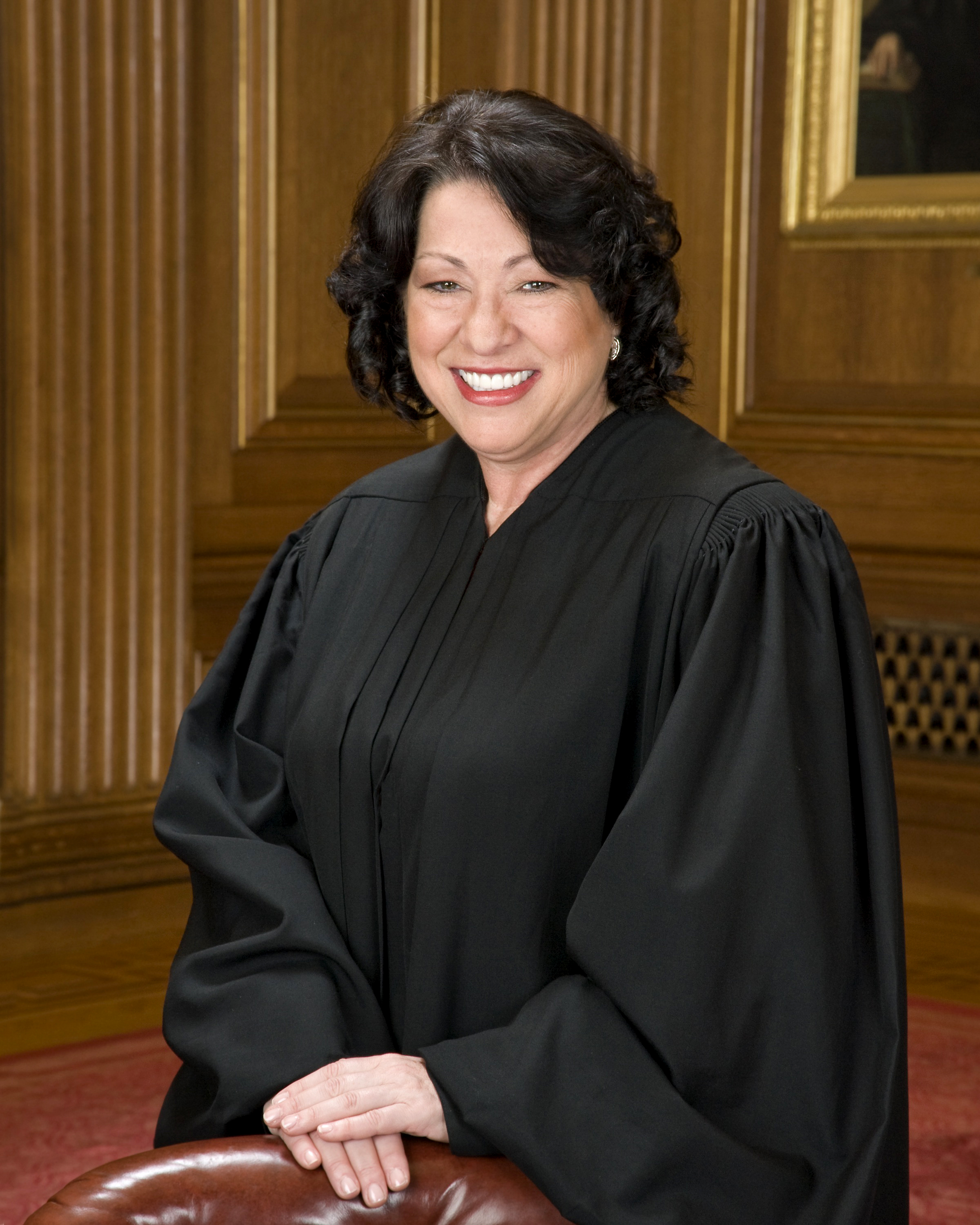
Sonia Sotomayor delivered a dissenting opinion.

In a concurring opinion, Justice Clarence Thomas questioned the legality of the special counsel appointment, writing, "If there is no law establishing the office that the Special Counsel occupies, then he cannot proceed with this prosecution." Thomas argued that the special counsel's role would need to be established by Congress and be confirmed as an appointment through the Senate.

In an opinion concurring in part, Justice Amy Coney Barrett agreed in granting presidential immunity for the core constitutional powers of a president, arguing that such immunity meant that a president could obtain interlocutory review of the "constitutionality of a criminal statute as applied to official acts". She would apply a differing standard on other official acts, by first reviewing whether a criminal statute could apply to a president's official act and then whether its application to specific facts would interfere with a president's constitutional authority. Due to the president's lack of authority over institutions like state legislatures, Barrett did not view the president as having any immunity in his actions towards them. Barrett also opposed the exclusion of immune, official acts as evidence by prosecutors.

In a dissenting opinion, Justice Sonia Sotomayor wrote that granting immunity from prosecution would reshape the institution of the Presidency and risk permitting criminal conduct by presidents. Sotomayor said that the majority opinion would effectively expand what may be considered official acts beyond their core duties, depriving prosecutors of an effective means of bringing charges. Sotomayor expressed concerns that a president would be immune from prosecution in a number of hypothetical situations, such as in ordering assassinations of political rivals and taking bribes for pardons. She wrote that the ruling on presidential immunity was more expansive than the founders would have recognized. Roberts responded to the dissent, stating that the majority opinion was a narrower ruling than Sotomayor had described and referred to her hypothetical scenarios as fear mongering.

Justice Ketanji Brown Jackson wrote another dissenting opinion arguing that the ruling on presidential immunity would effectively empower the judiciary as a gatekeeper of accountability, resulting in downstream effects of weakening the power of Congress and removing incentives against presidential abuse of power. Jackson wrote that the ruling "declared for the first time in history that the most powerful official in the United States can (under circumstances yet to be fully determined) become a law unto himself".

== Reactions ==
=== Initial reactions ===
Trump's claims for "absolute immunity" have been rejected by most political commentators and two lower courts. In a unanimous ruling by the three-judge panel of the D.C. Court of Appeals, the court stated that if Trump's theory of constitutional authority were accepted, it would "collapse our system of separated powers" and put a president above the law.

Charlie Savage of The New York Times wrote that Trump's immunity claim challenged "a hallmark of American-style democracy: its suspicion of concentrated power". Savage further stated that "rather than a presidency at least theoretically checked by law, the country would be ruled by presidents who could openly commit official crimes with impunity, so long as enough allied lawmakers remained sufficiently loyal to block any impeachment."

Writing for Politico, former federal prosecutor Ankush Khardori wrote that Trump's claims were "ridiculous", criticized the Supreme Court for not dismissing them immediately and thus potentially delaying Trump's criminal trials until after the 2024 presidential election, and criticized the court for "issuing transparently political rulings that are clearly aligned with the political priorities of the Republican Party".

=== Reactions to oral arguments ===
Following oral arguments on April 25, reactions to the Supreme Court seemingly entertaining some form of presidential immunity for Trump were overwhelmingly negative from a variety of historians, journalists, commentators, political scientists, and constitutional scholars. Many referred to Trump's arguments as those of a "king"; heavily criticized conservative justices for seemingly expressing more concern for preventing hypothetical future prosecutions of presidents; accused court conservatives for appearing unconcerned and giving serious thought as to whether assassinations, bribes, and military coups were protected "official" acts; accused court conservatives of being pro-Trump and misinterpreting the Constitution; and accused the court of being on the cusp of losing all remaining legitimacy.

Particular criticism was raised towards Justice Samuel Alito, who asked during the oral arguments, "Now if an incumbent who loses a very close, hotly contested election knows that a real possibility after leaving office is not that the president is going to be able to go off into a peaceful retirement, but that the president may be criminally prosecuted by a bitter political opponent, will that not lead us into a cycle that destabilizes the functioning of our country as a democracy?" Journalists stated that in the history of the United States, the transfer of presidential power had been peaceful save for the events of January 6, making Alito's question a means to treat Trump as a new normal. Other criticism was levied at court conservatives seemingly abandoning their professed belief in originalism that was used to overturn the right to an abortion in Roe v. Wade (1973) to create a basis of presidential immunity that does not exist in the Constitution.

Democratic Representative Jamie Raskin responded to oral arguments by saying that "they should move the Supreme Court over to the RNC headquarters, because they're acting like a bunch of partisan operatives." In an interview with Meet the Press, Senate minority leader Mitch McConnell, a Republican, stated that he did not believe presidents should be immune from prosecution for actions committed in office.

=== Reactions to the ruling ===
==== Support ====
Trump, posting on Truth Social, remarked of the decision "BIG WIN FOR OUR CONSTITUTION AND DEMOCRACY. PROUD TO BE AN AMERICAN!" Trump's legal team and other commentators believed that the ruling could affect the result of the classified documents case. Trump and his legal team also expressed interest in using the ruling to set aside his convictions in New York State. The decision was also supported by many Republican politicians, including JD Vance, Jim Jordan, Elise Stefanik, and Steve Scalise. Former Attorney General William Barr dismissed Sotomayor's dissent, as well as other criticisms of the ruling, arguing that Sotomayor's hypothetical scenarios "[make] no sense whatsoever". Barr argued that "horror stories" surrounding the decision were irrelevant, as the president's official powers do not give him the authority to assassinate political rivals.

Legal expert and CNN commentator Timothy C. Parlatore wrote in support of the ruling, arguing it would benefit both Republican and Democratic administrations, by protecting them from "overzealous or politically motivated prosecutions". Parlatore also dismissed criticisms of the decision as "breathless" and "greatly overblown". Legal commentator and law professor Jonathan H. Adler wrote in support of the ruling, although he sided with Barrett's concurrence as opposed to Roberts's majority ruling. Adler argued that while presidential immunity may lack explicit textual basis, it is nonetheless a logical "consequence of the nature of executive power".

The Las Vegas Review-Journal wrote in support of the decision, arguing that the majority ruling settled on a middle ground between absolute immunity and none at all. Legal commentators David B. Rivkin and Elizabeth Price Foley of The Wall Street Journal also supported the decision, arguing that the ruling protected the presidency itself, by preserving the ability of the government to function.

==== Opposition ====
President Biden Delivers Remarks on the Supreme Court's Immunity Ruling (4:44)
At the White House, President Joe Biden criticized the Supreme Court's ruling in Trump v. United States.

The decision was widely criticized by legal experts and historians, as well as Democratic politicians. These historians and scholars argued that the ruling reshaped the powers of the United States President for it limits checks on presidential power. Former White House Counsel John Dean said Richard Nixon (the president for whom Dean was White House Counsel) "would have survived" the Watergate scandal under the ruling "because the evidence against him was based on official acts the Supreme Court has deemed immune from prosecution". Several constitutional law experts have stated that the ruling would, in fact, make a president immune from prosecution for ordering the assassination of a political rival, as commanding the military falls as a part of the "core powers" the Constitution bestows on the office. Former federal prosecutor Ankush Khardori wrote that the ruling is not based in either textualism or originalism, that it effectively "rewrote the Constitution", and "may go down as one of the most brazenly political decisions in the history of the Supreme Court". The Washington Post ran a headline stating, "Supreme Court's Trump immunity ruling poses risk for democracy, experts say", and reported that multiple legal experts have raised fears that a future president could now act with impunity. Ryan Cooper of The American Prospect wrote that the ruling was the worst Supreme Court decision since Plessy v. Ferguson.

Representative Alexandria Ocasio-Cortez called the decision "an assault on American democracy" and introduced articles of impeachment against Justices Thomas and Alito.

President Biden described the Supreme Court's ruling as setting a "dangerous precedent" that "almost certainly means that there are virtually no limits on what a president can do" since "limits will be self-imposed by the president alone". Biden warned that Trump returning as president would be particularly dangerous under the court's ruling. "No one, no one is above the law, not even the president of the United States. [With] today's Supreme Court decision on presidential immunity, that fundamentally changed for all practical purposes", Biden said.

Senate Majority Leader Chuck Schumer said July 1, 2024 was a "sad day for America. Treason or incitement of an insurrection should not be considered a core constitutional power afforded to a president."

Former federal judge J. Michael Luttig stated: "There is no support whatsoever in the Constitution or even in the Supreme Court's precedents, for the past 200 years, for this reprehensible decision by the Supreme Court. Needless to say, the decision is irreconcilable with America's democracy, the Constitution, and the rule of law." He stated that "America's democracy and the rule of law are this country's heart and soul. Our democracy and the rule of law are what have made America the envy of the world and the beacon of freedom to the world for almost 250 years. Now, today, the Supreme Court cut that heart and soul out of America."

Former Attorney General Eric Holder said, "Our democracy has been gravely wounded", and added, "There is no basis in the Constitution for this Court-constructed monstrosity." Michael Waldman, president of the Brennan Center for Justice at New York University said, "The Court has issued an instruction manual for lawbreaking presidents. Make sure you conspire only with other government employees. You'll never be held to account."

Yale constitutional law professor Akhil Reed Amar wrote an article for The Atlantic titled "Something Has Gone Deeply Wrong at the Supreme Court".

Political cartoons addressed the ruling from various angles. One political cartoon by John Deering focuses on the Lincoln Memorial, where a saddened Abraham Lincoln holds a newspaper with a headline that reads, "SUPREME COURT HANDS TRUMP BROAD IMMUNITY". Next to him is a passage from the Gettysburg Address: "That we here highly resolve these dead shall not have died in vain – that the nation, shall have a new birth of freedom – and that government of the people, by the people, for the people, shall not perish from the earth." Another political cartoon by Michael Ramirez shows the Contemplation of Justice statue in front of the Supreme Court Building looking somber and long faced, speaking to the Blindfolded Justice statuette in her right hand, saying, "So, presidents are allowed to commit crimes, as long as it is part of their official duties?" A caption beneath the cartoon reads, "CONTEMPLATING JUSTICE". A third political cartoon by Lee Judge takes a less solemn tone, showing a group of obviously intoxicated Supreme Court justices in the "Supreme Court Lounge" drinking from a keg of "Trump moonshine". One figure in the doorway says to another, "It's the highest court in the land."

Satirical responses in the press also varied in their approach. One headline in The Washington Post's opinion section read, "The Supreme Court rules to restore the monarchy", while The Onion ran stories with headlines such as "Supreme Court Rules Trump Has Immunity For Any Crime Committed Between 9 And 5" and "New Trump Ad Shows Montage Of People He'll Kill If Elected".

Multiple news outlets compared the ruling to the Enabling Act of 1933 in Germany.

==== Attempts to overturn ====
On July 25, 2024, Democratic representative Joseph Morelle proposed a constitutional amendment to reverse the ruling, with the support of more than forty other members of Congress. Law professor and former federal prosecutor Kimberly Wehle wrote an op-ed supporting Morelle's amendment shortly after. Biden had previously announced his plan to introduce a separate amendment, known as the No One Is Above the Law Amendment, to eliminate all "immunity for crimes a former president committed while in office".

On August 1, 2024, Senator Chuck Schumer introduced the No Kings Act in the Senate, a proposed bill to abolish presidential immunity and declare that only Congress could grant immunity to federal law. The Act would also limit judicial review of its own provisions by providing a statute of limitations (180-days for facial challenges and 90-days for as-applied challenges), channeling jurisdiction to the U.S. District Court for the District of Columbia and D.C. Circuit (with the Supreme Court having no appellate jurisdiction), requiring proof of unconstitutionality by clear and convincing evidence, and forbidding sua sponte relief based on its unconstitutionality. The bill was sponsored by more than two dozen Democratic senators, but did not move forward in the 118th Congress.

== Impacts on cases ==
The Supreme Court's ruling delayed the case for Trump's federal election interference charges beyond the 2024 election, as Judge Chutkan continued to review Trump's alleged acts and evidence introduced by prosecutors to determine if they are immune from prosecution. Additionally, due to Trump's election on November 5, 2024, the Justice Department's Office of Legal Counsel may decide whether a president-elect can be prosecuted. Existing Justice Department protocols prohibit the prosecution of a sitting president.

Judge Scott McAfee was also expected to rule on whether parts of Trump's election interference charges in Georgia will be foreclosed by presidential immunity. Trump's attorneys had filed a motion on immunity in January 2024, with proceedings awaiting the Supreme Court's ruling. The case was also held up by proceedings on whether to disqualify prosecutor Fani Willis and as of mid-2024 was expected to resume in early 2025.

Trump's lawyers have filed a motion to apply presidential immunity against Trump's charges over retaining classified documents. Justice Thomas's concurrence also mirrored a motion filed by Trump's lawyers to dismiss his charges due to Jack Smith's appointment as special counsel, arguing that he was not appointed in accordance with the Constitution. On July 15, 2024, Judge Aileen Cannon dismissed the case, concluding that Smith's appointment violated the Appointments Clause of the Constitution.

Trump's sentencing date for his convictions in Manhattan was delayed from July to November 2024. Justice Juan Merchan indicated that he would rule on the applicability of presidential immunity to evidence introduced by the prosecution and if necessary conduct sentencing shortly after. On November 19, the Manhattan DA agreed to postpone sentencing until the conclusion of Trump's second presidency and argued that the conviction should stand because no law states that temporary presidential immunity nullifies proceedings conducted outside the president's time in office and concerning activity deemed unofficial to his post. On November 22, Merchan suspended the sentencing so Trump's team could provide arguments for dismissing the case post-trial.

On September 26, 2024, Jack Smith submitted a 165-page sealed brief in the federal prosecution for election obstruction, with Judge Chutkan approving a redacted version for public release the following week. The new brief established the prosecution's support for the injunctions against Trump on the basis that the actions Trump took were made outside the duties of the office of the presidency as to satisfy the Supreme Court decision in Trump, removing the evidence that was tied to the Justice Department, but introducing new evidence including discussions between Pence and Trump where Pence urged Trump to accept defeat.

In late November, Smith dropped both cases in light of Trump's election, which Chutkan granted.

== Notable citations ==
In May 2025, attorneys for local judge Hannah Dugan cited Trump v. United States in their motion for dismissal of a case brought by the Trump administration against Judge Dugan for directing an illegal immigrant to leave by a jury door after ICE agents showed up to the court house to arrest the immigrant. The attorneys asserted that Judge Dugan's actions were official acts exclusively within her constitutional authority and therefore the judge was immune from prosecution.

== See also ==
- Westfall Act
