= 2023 term per curiam opinions of the Supreme Court of the United States =

The Supreme Court of the United States handed down five per curiam opinions during its 2023 term, which began October 2, 2023, and concluded on October 6, 2024.

Because per curiam decisions are issued from the Court as an institution, these opinions all lack the attribution of authorship or joining votes to specific justices. All justices on the Court at the time the decision was handed down are assumed to have participated and concurred unless otherwise noted.

== Court membership ==
Chief Justice: John Roberts

Associate Justices: Clarence Thomas, Samuel Alito, Sonia Sotomayor, Elena Kagan, Neil Gorsuch, Brett Kavanaugh, Amy Coney Barrett, Ketanji Brown Jackson

== Trump v. Anderson ==
- Full caption: Donald J. Trump v. Norma Anderson, et al.
- Citations: 601 U.S. 100
- Prior history: Anderson v. Griswold, 2023 WL 8770111 (Colo. 2023)
- Full text of the opinion: official slip opinion · Oyez

601 U.S. 100
Argued February 8, 2024.
Decided March 4, 2024.
In the lead-up to the 2024 United States presidential election, a group of voters in Colorado filed a lawsuit in Colorado state court alleging that Donald Trump was ineligible to run for President again because his actions regarding the January 6 United States Capitol attack constituted "insurrection or rebellion against the United States," and thus violated Section 3 of the Fourteenth Amendment to the United States Constitution. The trial court held that Section 3 does not apply to the office of President because the president is not an “officer of the United States." The Colorado Supreme Court reversed, holding that Section 3 does apply to the office of president and Donald Trump's actions do violate it. As a result, the Colorado Supreme Court ordered the Colorado Secretary of State to not list Donald Trump's name on the ballot for president. The United States Supreme Court granted cert and held oral arguments on the matter. The Court held that the Fourteenth Amendment gives states the power to bar candidates for state office being on a ballot after they are accused of violating Section 3, but that only Congress may enforce Section 3 against candidates for federal office.

Justice Amy Coney Barrett filed an opinion concurring in part and concurring in the judgment. In it, she said that she agreed with the holding that states may not bar candidates for federal office from being on a ballot, but would not have decided whether congressional legislation is the only way to enforce Section 3 against federal candidates.

Justices Sotomayor, Kagan, and Jackson filed a joint opinion concurring in the judgment. They agreed with the majority that states may not remove candidates for federal office from the ballot unilaterally, and agreed with Justice Barrett that the remaining five justices went too far in deciding that only congressional legislation can remove candidates for federal office from the ballot.

== O'Connor-Ratcliff v. Garnier ==
- Full caption: Michelle O'Connor-Ratcliff, et al. v. Christopher Garnier, et ux.
- Citations: 601 U.S. 205
- Full text of the opinion: official slip opinion · Oyez

601 U.S. 205
Argued October 31, 2023.
Decided March 15, 2024.
Michelle O’Connor-Ratcliff and T. J. Zane were two candidates for the Board of Trustees of the Poway Unified School District in 2014. They each created Facebook pages to promote their campaigns in addition to their personal Facebook pages. After winning their elections, both individuals used the pages created for their campaigns to post updates about the school district and to communicate with their constituents. Christopher and Kimberly Garnier were two of those constituents, and they often would use the comments sections on O’Connor-Ratcliff and Zane's pages to criticize their actions, sometimes in ways that the trustees considered annoying. As a result, both trustees blocked the Garniers, who subsequently sued the trustees for violating their First Amendment rights. The district court granted the trustees qualified immunity but allowed the case to proceed on the merits. The Ninth Circuit Court of Appeals affirmed that judgement, holding that the trustees' actions on Facebook qualified as state actions because of the "close nexus" between their Facebook posts and their official positions. The United States Supreme Court granted certiorari on this case, and in light of their holding in Lindke v. Freed, vacated and remanded it for further proceedings.

== Gonzalez v. Trevino ==
- Full caption: Sylvia Gonzalez v. Edward Trevino, II, et al.
- Citations: 602 U.S. 653
- Full text of the opinion: official slip opinion · Oyez

602 U.S. 653
Argued March 20, 2024.
Decided June 20, 2024.
Sylvia Gonzalez was elected to the city council of Castle Hills, Texas in May 2019. One of the first initiatives that she took on after her inauguration was to collect signatures on a petition seeking to remove the city manager, Ryan Rapelye. After more than 300 residents signed the petition, Rapelye's removal was put on the agenda of the next council meeting. The meeting became contentious, with so many residents speaking from both perspectives on the issue that the council decided to hold a second day of discussions. After the discussion concluded on the second day, Edward Trevino, the mayor of the city and a political ally of Rapelye's, asked Gonzalez for the petition. Gonzalez said that Trevino already had it. Trevino denied this, and asked Gonzalez to check her binder. She checked it, and found the petition inside. She told Trevino that she did not intentionally put the petition in her binder, and that she was surprised she had it. Trevino notified the city's police department of the incident, which conducted an investigation and concluded that Gonzalez violated a Texas statute which prohibited tampering with government records. Gonzalez was arrested, and spent a night in jail before the local district attorney decided not to pursue the charges.

Gonzalez sued both the mayor and the police department, alleging that she was arrested as retaliation for organizing the effort to remove Rapelye. In her suit, she claimed that she had reviewed the data for arrests under the anti-tampering statute, and that she was the first person to be charged with a violation of it for removing a nonbinding or expressive document. She used this claim to show that her charge was politically motivated - that the mayor and police chief had essentially sought to find a crime that fit her. The defendants moved to dismiss the case, arguing that because she took possession of the petition in her binder, probable cause for the alleged crime existed, even if instances of other violations of that statute were rare. Since probable cause existed, the District Court allowed her case to proceed, reasoning that it fell within an exemption to the rule barring these kind of cases that was established in Nieves v. Bartlett. The Fifth Circuit reversed that decision, holding that Gonzalez's case did not fall within the Nieves exception. Gonzalez appealed, and the Supreme Court granted certiorari.

In a per curiam opinion, the Supreme Court agreed with Gonzalez's argument that the Fifth Circuit was too narrow in their reading of the exception in Nieves v. Bartlett. Gonzalez was able to provide evidence that her arrest occurred in a circumstance where officers have probable cause to perform an arrest, but usually choose not to do so. Because of this, the Supreme Court vacated the Fifth Circuit's judgment and remanded the case for further consideration.

Justice Alito filed a concurrence agreeing that the Fifth Circuit's reading of Nieves v. Bartlett was too narrow. He wrote to remind lower courts that the exception in Nieves was an exception, and thus should not be used often. He also wrote that Nieves was not limited to cases where the arrest in question was a split-second one, and should apply to cases where investigations had led to warrants, which led to arrests.

Justice Kavanaugh filed a concurrence in which he argued that while the per curiam did not "say anything that is harmful to the law," he thought that Gonzalez's case should have been analyzed by looking at her Mens rea in taking the document, not whether her conduct compared to similar fact patterns which did not end in an arrest.

Justice Jackson filed a concurrence which was joined by Justice Sotomayor. In it, she wrote that the per curiam opinion was correct in using Gonzalez's review of similar cases was a permissible form of evidence with which to bring a claim, it is not the only acceptable evidence. Other methods, such as arrest procedures, timing, and documentation by officers, could also be used similarly.

== Moyle v. United States ==
- Full caption: Mike Moyle, Speaker of the Idaho House of Representatives, et al. v. United States
- Citations: 603 U.S. 324
- Prior history: 623 F. Supp. 3d 1096 (Idaho 2022)
- Full text of the opinion: official slip opinion · Oyez

603 U.S. 324
Argued April 24, 2024.
Decided June 27, 2024.
The Court dismissed the writ of certiorari as improvidently granted.

Kagan filed a concurrence, joined by Sotomayor. Barrett filed a concurrence, joined by Roberts and Kavanaugh. Jackson filed an opinion concurring and dissenting in parts. Alito filed a dissent, joined by Thomas.

== Department of Education v. Louisiana ==
- Full caption
- Citations: 603 U.S. ___
- Full text of the opinion: official slip opinion · Justia

603 U.S. ___
Decided August 16, 2024.
In 2024, the Biden Administration's Department of Justice promulgated a new rule regarding Title IX of the Education Amendments of 1972 that redefined sex discrimination to "includ[e] discrimination on the basis of sex stereotypes, sex characteristics, pregnancy or related conditions, sexual orientation, and gender identity.” Numerous entities, including the State of Louisiana, sued to block the implementation of the new rule, arguing that the new definition exceeded the Congressionally-enacted boundaries of the text of Title IX. District Courts in Kentucky and Louisiana agreed with this argument, and issued preliminary injunctions prohibiting the rule from being implemented. The government appealed, and both the Fifth and Sixth Circuits declined to stay the injunctions during those appeals, thus continuing to prevent the new definition from taking effect. The government appealed to the Supreme Court, which in a per curiam opinion also declined to stay the injunctions while the appeals progressed. The opinion stated that the government did not meet its burden to show a likelihood of success on the merits or that the equities in the case favored a stay.

Justice Sotomayor filed a dissent, joined by Justices Kagan, Gorsuch, and Jackson. In it, she agreed that Louisiana and the other respondents were entitled to relief regarding some provisions of the new rule, but argued that the other provisions should be allowed to go into effect while litigation continued.

== See also ==
- List of United States Supreme Court cases, volume 601
- List of United States Supreme Court cases, volume 602
- List of United States Supreme Court cases, volume 603
