= United States v. Rahimi =

United States Supreme Court case

- Supreme Court of the United States

Argued November 7, 2023 Decided June 21, 2024
- Full case name: United States, Petitioner v. Zackey Rahimi
- Docket no.: 22-915
- Citations: 602 U.S. 680 (more) 144 S.Ct. 1889; 219 L. Ed. 2d 351
- Argument: Oral argument
- Decision: Opinion

Case history
- Prior: Defendant pleaded guilty. United States v. Rahimi, No. 21-cr-83 (N.D. Tex. 2021).; Conviction affirmed. No. 21-11001 (5th Cir. 2022).; Prior opinion withdrawn and conviction vacated. 59 F.4th 163 (5th Cir. 2023).; Prior opinion withdrawn and conviction vacated. 61 F.4th 443 (5th Cir. 2023).; Cert granted. 600 U.S. ___ (2023).
- Subsequent: Conviction affirmed. 117 F.4th 331 (5th Cir. 2024).

Questions presented
- Whether 18 U.S.C. § 922(g)(8), which prohibits the possession of firearms by persons subject to domestic-violence restraining orders, violates the Second Amendment on its face.

Holding
- When an individual has been found by a court to pose a credible threat to the physical safety of another, that individual may be temporarily disarmed consistent with the Second Amendment.

Court membership
- Chief Justice John Roberts Associate Justices Clarence Thomas · Samuel Alito; Sonia Sotomayor · Elena Kagan; Neil Gorsuch · Brett Kavanaugh; Amy Coney Barrett · Ketanji Brown Jackson

Case opinions
- Majority: Roberts, joined by Alito, Sotomayor, Kagan, Gorsuch, Kavanaugh, Barrett, Jackson
- Concurrence: Sotomayor, joined by Kagan
- Concurrence: Gorsuch
- Concurrence: Kavanaugh
- Concurrence: Barrett
- Concurrence: Jackson
- Dissent: Thomas

Laws applied
- U.S. Const. amend. II; Violence Against Women Act of 1994

United States v. Rahimi, 602 U.S. 680 (2024), was a United States Supreme Court case regarding the Second Amendment to the United States Constitution and whether it empowers the government to prohibit firearm possession by a person with a civil domestic violence restraining order in the absence of a corresponding criminal domestic violence conviction or charge.

It came from a 2023 decision by the 5th Circuit Court of Appeals invalidating a federal law prohibiting individuals from possessing firearms while under a restraining order relating to domestic abuse. The Supreme Court reversed the 5th Circuit in an 8–1 ruling and upheld the law. In its decision, the Court refined the Bruen test, stating that in comparing modern gun control laws to historic tradition, courts should use similar analogues and general principles rather than strict matches.

== Background ==
In 2022, the Supreme Court of the United States issued a ruling in New York State Rifle & Pistol Association, Inc. v. Bruen, which changed the way courts assessed laws related to the Second Amendment to the United States Constitution. Rather than examining the history of the Second Amendment and its scope, then applying intermediate scrutiny if the former is unclear, the test articulated by Justice Clarence Thomas requires gun-related legislation to be in line with the country's historical firearm legislation. According to that opinion, laws must have "historical analogues" to laws existing at the time of the Second Amendment's ratification in 1791 or incorporation in 1868 via the Fourteenth Amendment.

Zackey Rahimi was issued a civil restraining order by a Texas state court on February 5, 2020; the order barred him from engaging in certain harassment-related behaviors towards his ex-girlfriend or her child, as well as owning firearms. The order came after an incident in December 2019 where Rahimi assaulted his girlfriend in a parking lot following an argument. Noticing that a bystander had witnessed the altercation, Rahimi fired a gun at the witness. Despite his prohibition on owning firearms and communicating with his girlfriend, Rahimi repeatedly defied the order. In May 2020, Rahimi was arrested after approaching her house in the middle of the night. In November 2020, he was charged with aggravated assault with a deadly weapon after threatening another woman with a gun.

Between December 2020 and January 2021, Rahimi took part in five shootings. First, he shot at a man who purchased drugs from him after the man spoke disrespectfully to him; Rahimi fired into the man's house with an AR-15. The next day, Rahimi was involved in a traffic collision and fired at the other driver. He fled the scene of the crash, returned, fired more shots at the other driver, then fled again. Three days after the first shooting, Rahimi fired a gun into the air while in the presence of children. Some weeks after that shooting, a truck on the highway flashed its headlights at Rahimi when he sped past the truck; Rahimi then followed the truck off the highway and fired shots at another car that had been following the truck. Finally, Rahimi fired a gun into the air at a fast food restaurant after a friend's credit card was declined.

Suspecting Rahimi of these shootings, officers executed a search warrant at his home, discovering a rifle and a pistol he admitted to possessing. Officers additionally found ammunition, magazines, and a copy of the protective order. He was charged and pleaded guilty in a federal district court of unlawful firearm possession under 18 U.S.C. § 922(g)(8), which prohibits individuals from owning firearms if they are "subject to a court order that restrains [them] from harassing, stalking, or threatening an intimate partner."

Domestic violence protective orders related to bans on possessing a firearm became enacted by the 1968 Gun Control Act. However, the federal law which enforced the restraining order in question was the 1994 Violence Against Women Act.

== Procedural history ==
Rahimi appealed his conviction, bringing a facial challenge to U.S.C. § 922(g)(8) in the U.S. District Court for the Northern District of Texas on Second Amendment grounds. The court rejected his challenge, (Note: Stern (2023) writes that the district court ruled for Rahimi, but that version of events is not supported by other sources – the article cites United States v. Perez-Gallan, a separate case involving similar questions.) and Rahimi appealed to the Fifth Circuit Court of Appeals. A panel for the Fifth Circuit initially upheld Section 922(g)(8), but while Rahimi's petition for a rehearing was pending, the Supreme Court decided Bruen, causing the panel to withdraw its opinion. The parties filed supplementary briefs and re-argued the case before a new panel of three judges.

On February 2, 2023, the Fifth Circuit Court of Appeals struck down U.S.C. § 922(g)(8) as unconstitutional, barring it from being enforced in Texas, Mississippi, and Louisiana. The Fifth Circuit withdrew the panel's opinion and filed a revised opinion on March 2, 2023, reaching the same result. On March 17, 2023, the United States Justice Department petitioned the Supreme Court to overturn the appeals court decision and allow the federal law criminalizing firearm ownership by people under domestic violence restraining orders to stand.

=== Opinions of the Fifth Circuit ===
Writing the February 2 opinion for the unanimous panel, Judge Cory T. Wilson rejected the government's argument that Second Amendment applies only to "law abiding, respectable citizens," citing Justice Amy Coney Barrett's dissent in Kanter v. Barr, when she served as a judge on the United States Court of Appeals for the Seventh Circuit. Justice Barrett argued, "Founding era legislatures did not strip felons of the right to bear arms simply because of their status as felons," or impose any "virtue-based restrictions" on that right.

Judge Wilson then applied the historical tradition test articulated in Bruen in considering whether the historical analogues put forward by the Justice Department were applicable to Section 922(g)(8). The Justice Department had submitted three categories of possible analogues: "(1) English and American laws...providing for the disarmament of 'dangerous' people, (2) English and American 'going armed' laws, and (3) colonial and early state surety laws". The February 2 opinion stated that the historical laws disarming "dangerous" classes of people were not similar to the modern law, because "The purpose of these 'dangerousness' laws was the preservation of political and social order, not the protection of an identified person from the specific threat posed by another".

The revised March 2 opinion included an expanded concurrence from Judge James C. Ho, arguing that "civil protective orders are too often misused as a tactical device in divorce proceedings – and issued without any actual threat of danger". Judge Wilson went further and argued that Section 922(g)(8) could even put victims of domestic violence "in greater danger than before", because they would be unable to defend themselves against their abusers with guns, if a judge had issued a "mutual" protective order.

==== Reactions ====
In her March 29, 2023, opinion for The New York Times following the Fifth Circuit Court of Appeals' decision, Linda Greenhouse stressed the importance of the government's appeal to the Supreme Court. Greenhouse predicted that the Court would take the case and wrote that the Court's eventual decision would clarify how favorable the current Court is toward gun owners. The Guardian later called the case as one of the most consequential cases of the term.

== Supreme Court ==
In its June 30, 2023, order list, the Supreme Court agreed to hear this case.

=== Oral arguments ===
Oral arguments were heard on November 7, 2023. The case was argued, on behalf of the United States, by Solicitor General Elizabeth Prelogar and, on behalf of Rahimi, J. Matthew Wright, Rahimi's local federal public defender.

=== Opinion of the Court ===
On June 21, 2024, the Supreme Court ruled 8–1 with the government, upholding the ability to temporarily restrict individuals deemed to be a physical threat from gun possession which was granted through the 1994 law. Chief Justice Roberts wrote the majority opinion, joined by all but Justice Clarence Thomas. Roberts, while applying the "historic tradition" standard from Bruen, stated that the courts should not consider Bruen as rigid as the Fifth Circuit had done in looking for a "historic twin", and instead look at aspects of history that are “relevantly similar” to the modern law under challenge. To that end, Roberts stated that "firearm laws have included provisions preventing individuals who threaten physical harm to others from misusing firearms", and through both English and U.S. laws, "[they] confirm what common sense suggests: When an individual poses a clear threat of violence to another, the threatening individual may be disarmed." The majority did agree in judgment that in Rahimi's case, the government's argument that Rahimi was not a responsible citizen was not sufficient to deny him his Second Amendment rights.

Thomas, the author of the Bruen majority decision, stated in his dissent that the government had failed to point to any historical laws that were similar to the current law to support the Bruen test. Thomas maintained that the Bruen test required a stricter historical comparison than used by the majority.

Several of the justices wrote their own concurrences to opine on the specificity of the "historic tradition" test from Bruen as applied here. Justice Sonia Sotomayor, joined by Justice Elena Kagan, who had both dissented in the Bruen decision, asserted again that Bruen was wrongly decided, but unlike the exacting requirements that Thomas set forth in his dissent, the majority in Rahimi "permits a historical inquiry calibrated to reveal something useful and transferable to the present day". Justice Ketanji Brown Jackson agreed with Sotomayor that Bruen was wrongly decided, and in relation to the confusion in handling gun rights cases in lower courts "the blame may lie with us, not with them". Justice Amy Coney Barrett supported the majority decision in allowing analogues rather than exact comparisons to be used for the Bruen test, and that requiring "21st-century regulations to follow late 18th-century policy choices [gives] us 'a law trapped in amber.' And it assumes that founding-era legislatures maximally exercised their power to regulate, thereby adopting a 'use it or lose it' view of legislative authority," whereas Bruen requires a "wider lens". Justice Neil Gorsuch agreed with Thomas that the Bruen test should use a more strict comparison, but stated that the government had successfully demonstrated the necessary historical laws to justify the modern-day regulation.
