= 2023 term opinions of the Supreme Court of the United States =

October 2023 to October 2024 opinions

The 2023 term of the Supreme Court of the United States began October 2, 2023, and concluded October 6, 2024. The table below illustrates which opinion was filed by each justice in each case and which justices joined each opinion.

== Table key ==
Delivered the court's opinion

Joined the court's opinion

Filed a concurrence

Joined a concurrence

Filed a dissent

Joined a dissent

Filed a concurrence/dissent

Joined a concurrence/dissent

Filed a statement

Joined a statement

Did not participate in the decision
- Decisions that do not note an argument date were decided without oral argument. Decisions that do not note a justice delivering the court's opinion are per curiam.
- Multiple concurrences and dissents within a case are numbered, with joining votes numbered accordingly. Justices frequently join multiple opinions in a single case; each vote is subdivided accordingly.
- An asterisk ( * ) in the court's opinion denotes that it was only a majority in part or a plurality. An asterisk in a joining vote denotes that the justice joined it only in part.
- A dash ( - ) denotes that the justice voted without filing or joining an opinion.

== 2023 term opinions ==
#	Case name and citation	Argued	Decided	Roberts	Thomas	Alito	Sotomayor	Kagan	Gorsuch	Kavanaugh	Barrett	Jackson
1	Acheson Hotels, LLC v. Laufer, 601 U.S. 1	October 4, 2023	December 5, 2023		1							2
2	Murray v. UBS Securities, LLC, 601 U.S. 23	October 10, 2023	February 8, 2024									
3	Department of Agriculture Rural Development Rural Housing Service v. Kirtz, 601 U.S. 42	November 6, 2023	February 8, 2024									
4	Great Lakes Insurance SE v. Raiders Retreat Realty Co., LLC, 601 U.S. 65	October 10, 2023	February 21, 2024									
5	McElrath v. Georgia, 601 U.S. 87	November 28, 2023	February 21, 2024									
6	Trump v. Anderson, 601 U.S. 100	February 8, 2024	March 4, 2024				2	2			* / 1	2
7	Pulsifer v. United States, 601 U.S. 124	October 2, 2023	March 15, 2024									
8	Lindke v. Freed, 601 U.S. 187	October 31, 2023	March 15, 2024									
9	O'Connor-Ratcliff v. Garnier, 601 U.S. 205	October 31, 2023	March 15, 2024									
10	Wilkinson v. Garland, 601 U.S. 209	November 28, 2023	March 19, 2024	1 / 2	2	2						
11	Federal Bureau of Investigation v. Fikre, 601 U.S. 234	January 8, 2024	March 19, 2024									
12	Bissonnette v. LePage Bakeries Park St., LLC, 601 U.S. 246	February 20, 2024	April 12, 2024									
13	Macquarie Infrastructure Corp. v. Moab Partners, L.P., 601 U.S. 257	January 16, 2024	April 12, 2024									
14	Sheetz v. County of El Dorado, 601 U.S. 267	January 9, 2024	April 12, 2024				1	3	2	3		1 / 3
15	DeVillier v. Texas, 601 U.S. 285	January 16, 2024	April 16, 2024									
16	Rudisill v. McDonough, 601 U.S. 294	November 8, 2023	April 16, 2024									
17	McIntosh v. United States, 601 U.S. 330	February 27, 2024	April 17, 2024									
18	Muldrow v. City of St. Louis, 601 U.S. 346	December 6, 2023	April 17, 2024		1	2				3		
19	Warner Chappell Music, Inc. v. Nealy, 601 U.S. 366	February 21, 2024	May 9, 2024									
20	Culley v. Marshall, 601 U.S. 377	October 30, 2023	May 9, 2024									
21	Consumer Financial Protection Bureau v. Community Financial Services Ass'n of America, Ltd., 601 U.S. 416	October 3, 2023	May 16, 2024				1	1		1	1	2
22	Smith v. Spizzirri, 601 U.S. 472	April 22, 2024	May 16, 2024									
23	Harrow v. Department of Defense, 601 U.S. 480	March 25, 2024	May 16, 2024									
24	Alexander v. South Carolina State Conference of the NAACP, 602 U.S. 1	October 11, 2023	May 23, 2024		*							
25	Brown v. United States, 602 U.S. 101	November 27, 2023	May 23, 2024						*			
26	Coinbase, Inc. v. Suski, 602 U.S. 143	February 28, 2024	May 23, 2024									
27	Thornell v. Jones, 602 U.S. 154	April 17, 2024	May 30, 2024				1	1				2
28	National Rifle Association of America v. Vullo, 602 U.S. 175	March 18, 2024	May 30, 2024						1			2
29	Cantero v. Bank of America, N. A., 602 U.S. 205	February 27, 2024	May 30, 2024									
30	Becerra v. San Carlos Apache Tribe, 602 U.S. 222	March 25, 2024	June 6, 2024									
31	Connelly v. United States, 602 U.S. 257	March 27, 2024	June 6, 2024									
32	Truck Insurance Exchange v. Kaiser Gypsum Co., 602 U.S. 268	March 19, 2024	June 6, 2024									
33	Vidal v. Elster, 602 U.S. 286	November 13, 2023	June 13, 2024	* / 1	*		2* / 3	2 / 3		* / 1	* / 2	2* / 3
34	Starbucks Corp. v. McKinney, 602 U.S. 339	April 23, 2024	June 13, 2024									
35	FDA v. Alliance for Hippocratic Medicine, 602 U.S. 367	March 26, 2024	June 13, 2024									
36	Garland v. Cargill, 602 U.S. 406	February 28, 2024	June 14, 2024									
37	Campos-Chaves v. Garland, 602 U.S. 447	January 8, 2024	June 14, 2024									
38	Office of the United States Trustee v. John Q. Hammons Fall 2006, LLC, 602 U.S. 487	January 9, 2024	June 14, 2024									
39	Diaz v. United States, 602 U.S. 526	March 19, 2024	June 20, 2024									
40	Chiaverini v. City of Napoleon, 602 U.S. 556	April 15, 2024	June 20, 2024		1	1			2			
41	Moore v. United States, 602 U.S. 572	December 5, 2023	June 20, 2024			2					2	1
42	Gonzalez v. Trevino, 602 U.S. 653	March 20, 2024	June 20, 2024			1	3			2		3
43	United States v. Rahimi, 602 U.S. 680	November 7, 2023	June 21, 2024				1	1	2	3	4	5
44	Smith v. Arizona, 602 U.S. 779	January 10, 2024	June 21, 2024	3	* / 1	3			* / 2			
45	Erlinger v. United States, 602 U.S. 821	March 27, 2024	June 21, 2024	1	2	1				1		1* / 2
46	Department of State v. Muñoz, 602 U.S. 899	April 23, 2024	June 21, 2024									
47	Texas v. New Mexico and Colorado, 602 U.S. 943	March 20, 2024	June 21, 2024									
48	Snyder v. United States, 603 U.S. 1	April 15, 2024	June 26, 2024									
49	Murthy v. Missouri, 603 U.S. 43	March 18, 2024	June 26, 2024									
50	SEC v. Jarkesy, 603 U.S. 109	November 29, 2023	June 27, 2024									
51	Harrington v. Purdue Pharma L.P., 603 U.S. 204	December 4, 2023	June 27, 2024									
52	Ohio v. EPA, 603 U.S. 279	February 21, 2024	June 27, 2024									
53	Moyle v. United States, 603 U.S. 324	April 24, 2024	June 27, 2024	2			1	1	*	2	2	1*
54	Loper Bright Enterprises v. Raimondo, 603 U.S. 369	January 17, 2024	June 28, 2024		1				2			
55	Fischer v. United States, 603 U.S. 480	April 16, 2024	June 28, 2024									
56	City of Grants Pass v. Johnson, 603 U.S. 520	April 22, 2024	June 28, 2024									
57	Trump v. United States, 603 U.S. 593	April 25, 2024	July 1, 2024		1		1	1			* / 2	1 / 2
58	Moody v. NetChoice, LLC, 603 U.S. 707	February 26, 2024	July 1, 2024		3 / 4	4			4		1	* / 2
59	Corner Post, Inc. v. Board of Governors of the Federal Reserve System, 603 U.S. 799	February 20, 2024	July 1, 2024									
60	Department of Education v. Louisiana, 603 U.S. 866		August 16, 2024									
#	Case name and citation	Argued	Decided	Roberts	Thomas	Alito	Sotomayor	Kagan	Gorsuch	Kavanaugh	Barrett	Jackson

== 2023 term membership and statistics ==
This was the nineteenth term of Chief Justice Roberts's tenure and the second term with the current membership.

Justice		Appointment history		Agreement with judgment		Opinions filed				
Seniority	Name	President	Date confirmed	%	#					Total
Chief Justice	John Roberts	George W. Bush	September 29, 2005	96.7%	58/60	7	1	0	1	9
Associate Justice	Clarence Thomas	George H. W. Bush	October 15, 1991	80%	48/60	7	11	0	5	23
Associate Justice	Samuel Alito	George W. Bush	January 31, 2006	83.1%	49/59	4	8	0	4	16
Associate Justice	Sonia Sotomayor	Barack Obama	August 6, 2009	70%	42/60	7	4	0	8	19
Associate Justice	Elena Kagan	Barack Obama	August 7, 2010	70%	42/60	7	3	0	2	12
Associate Justice	Neil Gorsuch	Donald Trump	April 7, 2017	78.3%	47/60	6	10	0	5	21
Associate Justice	Brett Kavanaugh	Donald Trump	October 6, 2018	95%	57/60	6	7	0	3	16
Associate Justice	Amy Coney Barrett	Donald Trump	October 26, 2020	91.7%	55/60	6	7	0	2	15
Associate Justice	Ketanji Brown Jackson	Joe Biden	April 7, 2022	68.3%	41/60	5	11	2	7	25
Notes on statistics: Opinion counts only include the bench opinions listed above; opinions relating to orders or in-chambers opinions are not included.; Agreement with the Court's judgment does not guarantee agreement with the reasoning expressed in its opinion. A justice is not considered in agreement if they dissented even in part. Agreement percentages are based only on the listed cases in which a justice participated and are rounded to the nearest one-tenth of one percentage point.; Individual opinion counts will not match the Court's totals; Sotomayor, Kagan, and Jackson jointly authored the concurrence in Trump v. Anderson, and it is counted separately for the justices but counted only once in the Court's totals.						Totals				
						55	60	2	37	154
