= List of United States Supreme Court cases, volume 601 =

This is a list of all the United States Supreme Court cases from volume 601 of the United States Reports:

Note: As of July 2025, final bound volumes for the U.S. Supreme Court's United States Reports have been published through volume 582 (June 2017). Newer cases from subsequent future volumes do not yet have official page numbers and typically use three underscores in place of the page number; e.g., Example v. United States, 700 U.S. ___ (2050).

Case name	Docket no.	Date decided
Acheson Hotels, LLC v. Laufer	22–429	December 5, 2023
The case is vacated as moot.
Murray v. UBS Securities, LLC	22–600	February 8, 2024
A whistleblower seeking to invoke the protections of section 806 of the SOX Act must prove that their protected activity was a contributing factor in the employer’s unfavorable personnel action, but need not prove that the employer acted with “retaliatory intent.”
Department of Agriculture Rural Development Rural Housing Service v. Kirtz	22–846	February 8, 2024
Yes, the FCRA waives the sovereign immunity of the United States
Great Lakes Insurance SE v. Raiders Retreat Realty Co., LLC	22–500	February 21, 2024
Choice-of-law provisions in maritime contracts are presumptively enforceable under federal maritime law, with narrow exceptions not applicable in this case.
McElrath v. Georgia	22–721	February 21, 2024
"Not guilty by reason of insanity" is an acquittal for double jeopardy purposes notwithstanding any inconsistency with the jury's other verdicts.
Trump v. Anderson	23–719	March 4, 2024
Only Congress, not the states, can determine eligibility for federal office under Section 3 of the Fourteenth Amendment. Colorado Supreme Court reversed.
Pulsifer v. United States	22–340	March 15, 2024
A criminal defendant facing a mandatory minimum sentence is eligible for safety-valve relief under 18 U.S.C. § 3553(f)(1) only if the defendant satisfies each of the provision’s three conditions.
Lindke v. Freed	22–611	March 15, 2024
A public official who prevents someone from commenting on the official's social-media page engages in state action under §1983 only if the official both (1) possessed actual authority to speak on the State's behalf on a particular matter, and (2) purported to exercise that authority when speaking in the relevant social-media posts.
O'Connor-Ratcliff v. Garnier	22–324	March 15, 2024
Remand to the Ninth Circuit for further consideration in light of the decision in Lindke.
Wilkinson v. Garland	22–666	March 19, 2024
Federal courts have the jurisdiction to review the determinations of immigration judges as a mixed question of law.
Federal Bureau of Investigation v. Fikre	22–1178	March 19, 2024
A complaint about being put on the No Fly List is not moot simply because the government later took the plaintiff off the List. To show mootness, the government must disclose the conduct that landed the plaintiff on the No Fly List and ensure that they will not be placed back on the List for engaging in the same or similar conduct in the future.
Bissonnette v. LePage Bakeries Park St., LLC	23–51	April 12, 2024
Transportation workers do not need to formally work in the transportation industry to be exempt from the Federal Arbitration Act.
Macquarie Infrastructure Corp. v. Moab Partners, L.P.	22–1165	April 12, 2024
Pure omissions are not actionable under the SEC's Rule 10b–5(b).
Sheetz v. County of El Dorado	22–1074	April 12, 2024
The Takings Clause does not distinguish between legislative and administrative land-use permit conditions.
DeVillier v. Texas	22–913	April 16, 2024
Texas state law provides a cause of action that allows property owners to vindicate their rights under the Takings Clause. It is not necessary to address whether a plaintiff has a cause of action arising directly under the Takings Clause.
Rudisill v. McDonough	22–888	April 16, 2024
Soldiers who accrue educational benefits under both the Montgomery and Post-9/11 GI Bills may use either one in any order.
McIntosh v. United States	22–7386	April 17, 2024
A court's failure to enter a preliminary order imposing criminal forfeiture before sentencing does not necessarily bar a judge from ordering forfeiture at sentencing.
Muldrow v. City of St. Louis	22–193	April 17, 2024
Title VII of the Civil Rights Act of 1964 protects against discriminatory job transfers even where the transfer does not result in a significant disadvantage.
Warner Chappell Music, Inc. v. Nealy	22–1078	May 9, 2024
Assuming the discovery rule applies to copyright infringement, the three-year statute of limitations for an infringement suit does not prevent recovery.
Culley v. Marshall	22–585	May 9, 2024
The Due Process Clause requires a timely civil-asset-forfeiture hearing but does not require a separate preliminary hearing.
Consumer Financial Protection Bureau v. Community Financial Services Association of America, Limited	22–448	May 16, 2024
The funding scheme of the Consumer Financial Protection Bureau is constitutional and in accordance with historic funding mechanisms.
Smith v. Spizzirri	22–1218	May 16, 2024
When a court finds that a lawsuit involves an arbitrable dispute and a party has requested a stay of the court proceeding pending arbitration, Section 3 of the Federal Arbitration Act compels the court to issue a stay, and the court lacks discretion to dismiss the suit.
Harrow v. Department of Defense	23–21	May 16, 2024
The 60-day filing deadline for appeals of decisions by the Merit Systems Protection Board is not jurisdictional, so courts have discretion to equitably toll it.

== See also ==
- List of United States Supreme Court cases by the Roberts Court
- 2023 term opinions of the Supreme Court of the United States
