= List of United States Supreme Court cases, volume 603 =

This is a list of all the United States Supreme Court cases from volume 603 of the United States Reports:

Note: As of July 2025, final bound volumes for the U.S. Supreme Court's United States Reports have been published through volume 582 (June 2017). Newer cases from subsequent future volumes do not yet have official page numbers and typically use three underscores in place of the page number; e.g., Example v. United States, 700 U.S. ___ (2050).

Case name	Docket no.	Date decided
Snyder v. United States	23–108	June 26, 2024
Section 666 proscribes bribes to state and local officials but does not make it a crime for those officials to accept gratuities for their past acts.
Murthy v. Missouri	23–411	June 26, 2024
Neither the individual nor the state plaintiffs have established Article III standing to seek an injunction against any defendant.
SEC v. Jarkesy	22–859	June 27, 2024
When the SEC seeks civil penalties against a defendant for securities fraud, the Seventh Amendment entitles the defendant to a jury trial.
Harrington v. Purdue Pharma L.P.	23–124	June 27, 2024
The bankruptcy code does not authorize a release and injunction that, as part of a plan of reorganization under Chapter 11, effectively seek to discharge claims against a nondebtor without the consent of affected claimants.
Ohio v. EPA	23A349	June 27, 2024
The applications for a stay are granted; enforcement of EPA’s rule against the applicants shall be stayed pending the disposition of the applicants’ petition for review in the D. C. Circuit and any petition for writ of certiorari, timely sought.
Moyle v. United States	23–726	June 27, 2024
The writs of certiorari before judgment are dismissed as improvidently granted, and the stays entered by the Court on January 5, 2024, are vacated.
Loper Bright Enterprises v. Raimondo	22–451	June 28, 2024
The Administrative Procedure Act requires courts to exercise their independent judgment in deciding whether an agency has acted within its statutory authority, and courts may not defer to an agency interpretation of the law simply because a statute is ambiguous; Chevron is overruled.
Fischer v. United States (2024)	23–5572	June 28, 2024
To prove a violation of 18 U.S.C. § 1512(c), the Government must establish that the defendant impaired the availability or integrity for use in an official proceeding of records, documents, objects, or other things used in an official proceeding, or attempted to do so.
City of Grants Pass v. Johnson	23–175	June 28, 2024
The enforcement of generally applicable laws regulating camping on public property does not constitute “cruel and unusual punishment” prohibited by the Eighth Amendment.
Trump v. United States	23–939	July 1, 2024
Under our constitutional structure of separated powers, the nature of Presidential power entitles a former President to absolute immunity from criminal prosecution for actions within his conclusive and preclusive constitutional authority. And he is entitled to at least presumptive immunity from prosecution for all his official acts. There is no immunity for unofficial acts.
Moody v. NetChoice, LLC	22–277	July 1, 2024
The judgments are vacated, and the cases are remanded, because neither the Eleventh Circuit nor the Fifth Circuit conducted a proper analysis of the facial First Amendment challenges to Florida and Texas laws regulating large internet platforms.
Corner Post, Inc. v. Board of Governors of the Federal Reserve System	22–1008	July 1, 2024
An APA claim does not accrue for purposes of §2401(a)'s 6-year statute of limitations until the plaintiff is injured by final agency action.

== See also ==
- List of United States Supreme Court cases by the Roberts Court
- 2023 term opinions of the Supreme Court of the United States
