= List of United States Supreme Court cases, volume 602 =

This is a list of all the United States Supreme Court cases from volume 602 of the United States Reports:

Note: As of July 2025, final bound volumes for the U.S. Supreme Court's United States Reports have been published through volume 582 (June 2017). Newer cases from subsequent future volumes do not yet have official page numbers and typically use three underscores in place of the page number; e.g., Example v. United States, 700 U.S. ___ (2050).

| Case name | Docket no. | Date decided |
|---|---|---|
| Alexander v. South Carolina State Conference of the NAACP | 22–807 | May 23, 2024 |
The District Court’s finding that race predominated in the design of District I in the Enacted Plan was clearly erroneous.
| Brown v. United States | 22–6389 | May 23, 2024 |
A state drug conviction counts as an ACCA predicate if it involved a drug on the federal schedules at the time of that conviction.
| Coinbase, Inc. v. Suski | 23–3 | May 23, 2024 |
Where one contract between parties sends disputes to arbitration and another contract sends disputes to courts, a court must decide which contract governs.
| Thornell v. Jones | 22–982 | May 30, 2024 |
The Ninth Circuit interpreted and applied Strickland v. Washington incorrectly. Reversed. Death sentence reinstated.
| National Rifle Association of America v. Vullo | 22–842 | May 30, 2024 |
The NRA plausibly alleged that respondent violated the First Amendment by coercing regulated entities to terminate their business relationships with the NRA in order to punish or suppress gun-promotion advocacy.
| Cantero v. Bank of America, N. A. | 22–529 | May 30, 2024 |
The Second Circuit failed to analyze whether New York’s interest-on-escrow law was preempted as applied to national banks in a manner consistent with the Dodd-Frank Wall Street Reform and Consumer Protection Act of 2010 and Barnett Bank of Marion Cty., N. A. v. Nelson.
| Becerra v. San Carlos Apache Tribe | 23–250 | June 6, 2024 |
The IHS must pay "contract support costs” not only to support IHS-funded activities, but also to support the tribe's expenditure of income collected from third parties.
| Connelly v. United States | 23–146 | June 6, 2024 |
A corporation’s contractual obligation to redeem shares is not necessarily a liability that reduces a corporation’s value for purposes of the federal estate tax. When calculating the federal estate tax, the value of a decedent’s shares in a closely held corporation must reflect the corporation’s fair market value.
| Truck Insurance Exchange v. Kaiser Gypsum Co. | 22–1079 | June 6, 2024 |
An insurer with financial responsibility for bankruptcy claims is a "party in interest" under §1109(b) that "may raise and may appear and be heard on any issue" in a Chapter 11 case.
| Vidal v. Elster | 22–704 | June 13, 2024 |
Whether the refusal to register a mark under Section 1052(c) violates the Free Speech Clause of the First Amendment when the mark contains criticism of a government official or public figure.
| Starbucks Corporation v. McKinney | 23–367 | June 13, 2024 |
The National Labor Relations Board, in pursuing injunctive relief, must meet the traditional four-factor test of Winter v. Natural Resources Defense Council.
| FDA v. Alliance for Hippocratic Medicine | 23–235 | June 13, 2024 |
Plaintiffs lacked Article III standing to challenge FDA’s actions regarding the regulation of mifepristone.
| Garland v. Cargill | 22–976 | June 14, 2024 |
The ATF exceeded its statutory authority by issuing a Rule that classifies a bump stock as a "machinegun" under §5845(b).
| Campos-Chaves v. Garland | 22–674 | June 14, 2024 |
Because each of the undocumented people in this case received a proper §1229(a)(2) notice for the hearings they missed and at which they were ordered removed, they cannot seek rescission of their in absentia removal orders on the basis of defective notice under §1229a(b)(5)(C)(ii).
| Office of the United States Trustee v. John Q. Hammons Fall 2006, LLC | 22–1238 | June 14, 2024 |
Prospective parity is the appropriate remedy for the short-lived and small disparity created by the fee statute held unconstitutional in Siegel v. Fitzgerald.
| Diaz v. United States | 23–14 | June 20, 2024 |
Expert testimony that "most people" in a group have a particular mental state is not an opinion about "the defendant" and thus does not violate Rule 704(b).
| Chiaverini v. City of Napoleon | 23–50 | June 20, 2024 |
Probable cause for one charge does not necessarily imply probable cause for all other charges.
| Moore v. United States | 22–800 | June 20, 2024 |
The Mandatory Repatriation Tax (MRT) does not exceed Congress’s constitutional authority.
| Gonzalez v. Trevino | 22–1025 | June 20, 2024 |
Plaintiffs alleging retaliatory arrest need only provide evidence that their arrest occurred in circumstances where probable cause exists to arrest, but officers typically exercise discretion and decline to arrest.
| United States v. Rahimi | 22–915 | June 21, 2024 |
When an individual has been found by a court to pose a credible threat to the physical safety of another, that individual may be temporarily disarmed consistent with the Second Amendment.
| Smith v. Arizona | 22–899 | June 21, 2024 |
When an expert conveys an absent analyst's statements in support of the expert's opinion, and the statements provide that support only if true, then the statements come into evidence for their truth.
| Erlinger v. United States | 23–370 | June 21, 2024 |
The Fifth and Sixth Amendments require a unanimous jury to make the determination beyond a reasonable doubt that a defendant’s past offenses were committed on separate occasions for ACCA purposes.
| Department of State v. Muñoz | 23–334 | June 21, 2024 |
A citizen does not have a fundamental liberty interest in her noncitizen spouse being admitted to the country.
| Texas v. New Mexico and Colorado | 141/ Orig. 141 | June 21, 2024 |
Because the proposed consent decree would dispose of the United States' Compact claims without its consent, the States' motion to enter the consent decree is denied.

== See also ==
- List of United States Supreme Court cases by the Roberts Court
- 2023 term opinions of the Supreme Court of the United States
