= Knight First Amendment Institute v. Trump =

American freedom of speech legal case

- Court: United States Court of Appeals for the Second Circuit
- Full case name: Knight First Amendment Institute at Columbia University; Rebecca Buckwalter; Philip Cohen; Holly Figueroa; Eugene Gu; Brandon Neely; Joseph Papp; and Nicholas Pappas, Plaintiffs, v. Donald J. Trump, President of the United States; Sean M. Spicer, White House Press Secretary; and Daniel Scavino, White House Director of Social Media and Assistant to the President, Defendants.
- Argued: March 6, 2019
- Decided: July 9, 2019
- Citation: 928 F.3d 226

Case history
- Appealed to: Trump v. Knight First Amendment Institute at Columbia University
- Subsequent actions: Vacated by the U.S. Supreme Court as Biden v. Knight First Am. Inst., No. 20-197, 593 U.S. ___ (2021), after the controversy was mooted by the inauguration of Joseph R. Biden, Jr. as President. Further clarified by the U.S. Supreme Court in Lindke v. Freed, 601 U.S. 187 (2024).

Holding
- Because it was held out to the public as an official account for conducting official business, President Trump's Twitter account functioned as a public forum.

Court membership
- Judges sitting: Barrington D. Parker, Jr., Peter W. Hall, Christopher F. Droney

Case opinions
- Majority: Parker, joined by a unanimous court

Laws applied
- First Amendment to the United States Constitution

Knight First Amendment Institute v. Trump, 928 F.3d 226 (2nd Cir. 2019), was a case at the U.S. Court of Appeals for the Second Circuit on the use of social media as a public forum. The plaintiffs, Philip N. Cohen, Eugene Gu, Holly Figueroa O'Reilly, Nicholas Pappas, Joseph M. Papp, Rebecca Buckwalter-Poza, and Brandon Neely, were a group of Twitter users blocked by then-U.S. President Donald Trump's personal @realDonaldTrump account. They alleged that Twitter constitutes a public forum, and that a government official blocking access to that forum violates the First Amendment. The lawsuit also named as defendants White House press secretary Sean Spicer and social media director Dan Scavino.

The plaintiffs were represented by the Knight First Amendment Institute at Columbia University, which itself was a plaintiff in the case. Though the Knight Institute's Twitter account had not been blocked by Trump, the lawsuit argued that they and other followers of the @realDonaldTrump Twitter account "are now deprived of their right to read the speech of the dissenters who have been blocked". The complaint also argued that posts to the @realDonaldTrump account are "official statements". The Second Circuit largely agreed, holding that Trump was a state actor for First Amendment purposes because he held out his personal Twitter account as an official account for conducting official business.

However, in 2021, the U.S. Supreme Court vacated the decision because per the mootness doctrine, the appeals process would not be completed before the swearing in of Joe Biden as President. In addition, the reasoning of Knight was clarified by later Supreme Court decisions, particularly Lindke v. Freed, which applied a narrower, two-pronged "actual and purported exercise of authority" test.

== Background ==
At the time, Twitter users could not see or respond to tweets from an account that had blocked them. As of July 2017, the @realDonaldTrump Twitter account had 33.7 million followers. Trump's tweets were often retweeted tens of thousands of times, and Trump frequently used Twitter to make policy statements prior to losing the 2020 presidential election, being suspended from Twitter in January 2021, and leaving the White House. Back in 2017, Spicer had stated that Trump's tweets are considered "official statements by the president of the United States". In July 2017, Trump tweeted that his use of social media is "MODERN DAY PRESIDENTIAL". That year, Citizens for Responsibility and Ethics in Washington had filed a lawsuit in the District Court for the District of Columbia, alleging violations of the Presidential Records Act for deleting tweets.

A month prior to filing its own lawsuit, the Knight Institute had sent a letter to Trump on behalf of two of the blocked Twitter users, asking that they and other blocked users have their accounts unblocked by Trump. The letter argued that Trump's personal Twitter account is a public forum, and that it is therefore unconstitutional to exclude dissenting views. The letter was copied to Spicer, Scavino, and White House counsel Don McGahn. The Trump administration did not respond to the letter. The Knight Institute then filed its own lawsuit in the District Court for the Southern District of New York.

== District Court ruling ==
Oral arguments were heard before Judge Naomi Reice Buchwald of the district court on March 9, 2018. On May 23, 2018, Buchwald granted in part and denied in part the plaintiff's motion for an injunction against Trump's blocking of Twitter accounts, ruling that such actions are unconstitutional on First Amendment grounds. The court ruled that the @realDonaldTrump Twitter account is "a presidential account as opposed to a personal account", and blocking people from it violates their rights to participate in a "designated public forum". Buchwald introduced the decision by writing:

This case requires us to consider whether a public official may, consistent with the First Amendment, “block” a person from his Twitter account in response to the political views that person has expressed, and whether the analysis differs because that public official is the President of the United States. The answer to both questions is no.

After this ruling, the seven Twitter users that were a part of the lawsuit were unblocked by the managers of Trump's account. In August 2018, the government filed an appeal with the Court of Appeals for the Second Circuit. Also in August, the Knight First Amendment Institute sent a letter to the Department of Justice requesting that the President comply with the Judge's ruling and unblock a list of 41 additional Twitter users, including Danny Zuker, MoveOn activist Jordan Uhl, health care activist Laura Packard, and journalists like Alex Kotch and Jules Suzdaltsev. Those users were then unblocked by @realDonaldTrump. Regardless, the Trump Administration appealed the ruling to the Second Circuit, claiming that the district court had subjected him to unconstitutional viewpoint discrimination in violation of his own free speech rights.

== Circuit Court ruling and appeal to U.S. Supreme Court ==
The Second Circuit issued its decision in July 2019, upholding the district court ruling. The Second Circuit determined that Trump used his Twitter account to conduct what he held out to the public to be official government business, and therefore, he cannot block Americans from the account on the basis of viewpoint. The government was denied an en banc review by the full Second Circuit in March 2020.

Trump petitioned the U.S. Supreme Court in August 2020 to hear his appeal of the Second Circuit ruling. Trump's petition requested that the Supreme Court answer the question of "Whether the First Amendment deprives a government official of his right to control his personal Twitter account by blocking third-party accounts if he uses that personal account in part to announce official actions and policies."

Following the 2020 election, in which Joe Biden was elected president, Biden became the petitioning party for this case (now known as Biden v. Knight First Amendment Institute) and other pending Supreme Court cases, replacing Trump in his role as president. On January 19, 2021, the Department of Justice filed a brief asking the Supreme Court to vacate the Second Circuit ruling on the grounds that Trump was soon leaving office and thus the case no longer concerned his account in its official capacity, thus rendering the case moot. The Knight Institute responded by arguing that the Second Circuit ruling should remain, claiming "The case is moot because President Trump's repeated violation of Twitter's terms of service led that company to shut down his account and to ban him permanently from its platform. Because it was President Trump's own voluntary actions that made the case moot, the Supreme Court should leave the appeals court's ruling in place."

The Supreme Court ultimately agreed with the Department of Justice, vacating the decision and remanding the case to the Second Circuit as to render the case moot on April 5, 2021. Justice Clarence Thomas issued a 12-page concurring opinion, arguing that Twitter and similar companies could face some First Amendment restrictions even though they are not government agencies. Thomas suggested that Section 230 of the Communications Decency Act had perhaps been construed too broadly, and that Twitter, Facebook, et al., should be regulated as common carriers.

== Impact ==
On the day of the Second Circuit's decision, former New York state representative Dov Hikind and candidate Joey Salads separately sued U.S. Representative Alexandria Ocasio-Cortez in federal court for blocking them from her Twitter account, based on the ruling from the Second Circuit. In July 2020, the Knight Institute sued Trump for the second time, on behalf of users who were blocked before Trump's inauguration, or who were not able to identify which tweet prompted Trump to block them. The Knight Institute voluntarily dropped that suit after Biden's inauguration.

In response to critics who questioned whether Twitter should have been considered a public forum, Knight Institute senior attorney Katie Fallow cited a 2017 U.S. Supreme Court decision, Packingham v. North Carolina, in which Justice Anthony Kennedy described social media as "the modern public square" and as one of the most important places for the exchange of views. That high court ruling struck down a North Carolina law that prohibited registered sex offenders from accessing social media sites. The Knight ruling was cited as an important development in the use of social media as a public forum, highlighting the perceived tendency of government officials to block access to those forums or delete past communications.

The Knight ruling was cited by a rapporteur public (advocate general) of a French appellate court when deciding a similar case involving the French Immigration Office (OFII) blocking a Twitter user who had made negative comments about that office.

== Subsequent developments ==
The U.S. Supreme Court granted certiorari to two similar cases in the 2023–24 term: O'Connor-Ratcliff v. Garnier and Lindke v. Freed. Both originated with disputes over public officials blocking members of the public from viewing the officials' personal social media accounts. The holding in Lindke was that speech on the personal accounts of public officials may be deemed state speech if two conditions are met. First, the official must have actual authority to use the personal account to speak on behalf of the government on a particular matter. Second, the official must purport to exercise that authority in the relevant posts. Only when those two factors are met is the personal account considered to provide speech by a state actor, thus prohibiting the official from blocking others or deleting messages critical of that official speech. Otherwise, speech that does not meet this two-pronged test is considered within the private activities of the official who may block or unblock content as desired. Per this modified test established by the Lindke ruling, the ruling in Knight may no longer be a useful precedent due to its failure to differentiate Trump's use of Twitter for personal outreach and campaigning as opposed to actual exercises of government authority.

== See also ==
- Donald Trump on social media
- List of lawsuits involving Donald Trump
