= Starbucks Corp. v. McKinney =

- Supreme Court of the United States

Argued April 23, 2024 Decided June 13, 2024
- Full case name: Starbucks Corporation v. M. Kathleen McKinney, Regional Director of Region 15 of the National Labor Relations Board, for and on Behalf of the National Labor Relations Board
- Docket no.: 23-367
- Citations: 602 U.S. 339 (more)
- Argument: Oral argument

Case history
- Prior: McKinney v. Starbucks Corp., 77 F.4th 391 (6th Cir. 2023)

Questions presented
- Whether courts must evaluate the NLRB's requests for section 10(j) injunctions under the traditional, stringent four-factor test for preliminary injunctions or under some other more lenient standard.

Holding
- The National Labor Relations Board, in pursuing injunctive relief, must meet the traditional four-factor test of Winter.

Court membership
- Chief Justice John Roberts Associate Justices Clarence Thomas · Samuel Alito; Sonia Sotomayor · Elena Kagan; Neil Gorsuch · Brett Kavanaugh; Amy Coney Barrett · Ketanji Brown Jackson

Case opinions
- Majority: Thomas, joined by Roberts, Alito, Sotomayor, Kagan, Gorsuch, Kavanaugh, Barrett
- Concur/dissent: Jackson

Laws applied
- Section 10(j) of the National Labor Relations Act of 1935 (29 U.S.C. § 160(j))

Starbucks Corp. v. McKinney, 602 U.S. 339 (2024), was a U.S. Supreme Court case about what standard a court must apply before granting a preliminary injunction requested by the National Labor Relations Board. The Court held in an 8–1 decision that the ordinary four-factor Winter v. Natural Resources Defense Council test applies.

== Background ==
=== Legal background ===
An injunction is a court order requiring a party to do something or to refrain from doing something. A preliminary injunction is one that lasts until there is a final judgment in the case, at which point the court might grant a permanent injunction under the test recognized by eBay Inc. v. MercExchange, L.L.C. (2006).

Winter v. Natural Resources Defense Council (2008) recognized a general four-factor test to be used when considering a request for a preliminary injunction:

1. whether the plaintiff is likely to succeed on the merits
2. whether the plaintiff is likely to suffer irreparable harm in the absence of preliminary relief
3. whether the balance of equities between the plaintiff and defendant justifies an injunction
4. whether the public interest would be disserved by an injunction

This is known as the Winter test.

Under section 10(j) of the National Labor Relations Act of 1935, when the NLRB is considering a complaint about unfair labor practices, it is empowered to petition a district court "for appropriate temporary relief" while the complaint is pending.

Lower courts were split on whether the Winter test applies to 10(j) injunctions. The Fourth, Seventh, Eight, and Ninth Circuits had held that the NLRB needed to satisfy the Winter test, whereas the Second, Third, Fifth, Sixth, Tenth, and Eleventh Circuits had held that the NLRB only needed to show "reasonable cause to believe that unfair labor practices have occurred" and that an injunctions would be "just and proper".

=== Factual background ===
In 2022, Starbucks fired seven employees who were trying to unionize one of the company's stores in Memphis, Tennessee. Starbucks said that it fired them because they had violated company rules by bringing a television crew into the store after hours. The workers, who called themselves the Memphis Seven, claimed that Starbucks had selectively enforced its policy to retaliate against them for their legally protected union-organizing, filing a complaint with the National Labor Relations Board.

Attorneys for the Board petitioned a district court to issue an injunction requiring Starbucks to reinstate the fired employees while the Board was considering the complaint.

== Opinion of the Court ==
Justice Clarence Thomas wrote the majority opinion, joined by all of the justices except Justice Jackson. The Court held that there is not a special test applied when the National Labor Relations Board requests a preliminary injunction; rather, the ordinary four-factor test from Winter v. Natural Resources Defense Council applies.

== Dissent in part ==
Justice Ketanji Brown Jackson filed an opinion concurring in part, dissenting in part, and concurring in the judgment.

== See also ==
- Starbucks unions

== General references ==
- Chung, Andrew (June 13, 2024). "US Supreme Court backs Starbucks over fired pro-union workers". Reuters.
- Gerstein, Terri; Hunter, Jenny (June 13, 2024). "Why Was Ketanji Brown Jackson Made to Stand Alone for the Rights of Starbucks Workers?". Slate.
- Knappenberger, Ryan (April 23, 2024). "Supreme Court signals support for Starbucks in bid to limit federal labor board". Courthouse News Service.
- Knappenberger, Ryan (June 13, 2024). "Siding in favor of Starbucks, Supreme Court limits federal labor board". Courthouse News Service.
- Larkin, Kurt G.; King, Elizabeth (May 6, 2024). "Supreme Court Hears Oral Argument in Starbucks v. McKinney regarding Preliminary Injunctions Granted Against Employers". The National Law Review.
- Moreno, J. Edward (April 23, 2024). "Supreme Court to Hear Starbucks Challenge to Labor Ruling". The New York Times. Archived from the original on April 23, 2024.
- Peck, Emily (June 13, 2024). "Supreme Court gives Starbucks a win in union battle". Axios.
- Wiessner, Daniel (January 18, 2024). "Starbucks case at US Supreme Court could limit labor board's key legal tool". Reuters.
