= Durbin amendment =

Requirement for the US Federal Reserve to limit debit card fees

The Durbin amendment, implemented by Regulation II, is a provision of United States federal law, 15 U.S.C. § 1693o-2, that requires the Federal Reserve to limit fees charged to retailers for debit card processing. It was passed as part of the Dodd–Frank financial reform legislation in 2010, as a last-minute addition by Dick Durbin, a senator from Illinois, after whom the amendment is named.

After the rule to limit fees, 12 C.F.R. §235, went into effect, a coalition of merchants sued the Federal Reserve. The rule was upheld when the Supreme Court denied petition for certiorari in 2014.

== Background ==
Interchange fees or "debit card swipe fees" are paid to banks by acquirers for the privilege of accepting payment cards. Merchants and card-issuing banks have long fought over these fees. Prior to the Durbin amendment, card swipe fees were unregulated and averaged about 44 cents per transaction.

Merchants lobbied heavily for a rule to limit debit card swipe fees. They accomplished this when the Durbin amendment passed with the Dodd-Frank financial reform legislation on July 21, 2010. This was considered a major loss for banks, who receive billions of dollars a year in income from swipe fees.

The law applies to banks with over $10 billion in assets, and these banks would have to charge debit card interchange fees that are "reasonable and proportional to the actual cost" of processing the transaction. The bill aimed to restrict anti-competitive practices and encourage competition, and included provisions which allow retailers to refuse to use credit cards for small purchases and offer incentives for using cash or another type of card.

The Durbin amendment also gave the Federal Reserve the power to regulate debit card interchange fees, and on December 16, 2010, the Fed proposed a maximum interchange fee of 12 cents per debit card transaction, which CardHub.com estimated would cost large banks $14 billion annually. On June 29, 2011, the Fed issued its final rule, which holds that the maximum interchange fee an issuer can receive from a single debit card transaction is 21 cents plus 5 basis points multiplied by the amount of the transaction. This rule also allows issuers to raise their interchange fees by as much as one cent if they implement certain fraud-prevention measures. An issuer eligible for this adjustment, could therefore receive an interchange fee of as much as 24 cents for the average debit card transaction (valued at $38), according to the Federal Reserve. This cap—which took effect on October 1, 2011, rather than July 21, 2011, as was previously announced—reduces fees by roughly $9.4 billion annually. As a result, banks made plans to raise account maintenance fees to compensate.

=== Federal Reserve Rule ===
The rule that the Federal Reserve issued went into effect on October 1, 2011 and capped the interchange rate paid to non-exempt card issuers at 0.05 percent plus twenty-one cents. The rule also allowed these non-exempt card issuers to earn an additional one-cent fraud prevention adjustment for implementation of fraud prevention policies.

=== Response to the rule ===
Merchants and card-issuing banks opposed the Federal Reserve rule.

The Merchant Payments Coalition (MPC) argued that this rule was unfair as the Durbin amendment required the Federal Reserve to ensure that banks take effective steps against fraud and determine how much of the cost banks should bear themselves. The MPC said that banks should actually have to reduce fraud before receiving more funds. The MPC pointed out that the common practice of having customers merely signing for debit card purchases processed through the Visa and MasterCard payment networks instead of requiring a PIN greatly increases fraud.

The American Bankers Association opposed the rule because it represents an "unprecedented transfer in costs from retailers to consumers – the result of government price fixing" leading to "consumers paying higher fees for basic bank services."

== Litigation against the rule ==
A coalition of merchants including the National Association of Convenience Stores (NACS) and National Restaurant Association sued the Federal Reserve and argued the rule exceeded the authority granted by Congress.

=== District court ===
In July 2013, U.S. District Judge Richard J. Leon ruled that the Federal Reserve did not comply with the Durbin amendment when crafting a rule to limit debit card swipe fees. Judge Leon ordered the Federal Reserve to re-write its rule governing the cap on debit card swipe fees and implement a temporary regulation as well.

The opinion was generally scathing and noted that the agency overruled its own staff, who had recommended a cap of 12 cents per transaction. Judge Leon held the Federal Reserve Board "clearly disregarded Congress' statutory intent by inappropriately inflating all debit-card transaction fees by billions of dollars." The judge also ruled that the Federal Reserve failed to ensure that merchants enjoy access to "multiple unaffiliated networks" to process each debit-card transaction, as also required by the Durbin amendment.

=== Court of Appeals ===
The D.C. Circuit Court of Appeals reversed and held the Federal Reserve reasonably interpreted Congress' intent of the Durbin amendment through its 2011 rule limiting swipe fees. "Given that the Board's rule advances the Durbin amendment's purpose, we decline to second-guess its reasoned decision to reject an alternative option that might have further advanced the purpose."

The three judge panel noted that "Congress put the Board, the district court and us in a real bind...given that the Durbin amendment was crafted in conference committee at the eleventh hour, its language is confusing and its structure convoluted."

=== Supreme Court ===
On August 18, 2014, NACS filed a petition for certiorari. On January 20, 2015, the Supreme Court denied NACS petition for certiorari. The decision upholds the Federal Reserve rule on the interchange rate paid to non-exempt card issuers at 0.05 percent plus twenty-one cents.

== See also ==
- Payment Card Interchange Fee and Merchant Discount Antitrust Litigation
- Corner Post, Inc. v. Board of Governors of the Federal Reserve System
