= Cantero v. Bank of America, N.A. =

- Supreme Court of the United States

Decided May 30, 2024
- Full case name: Cantero v. Bank of America, N.A.
- Docket no.: 22-529
- Citations: 602 U.S. 205 (more)

Holding
- The Second Circuit failed to analyze whether New York’s interest-on-escrow law was preempted as applied to national banks in a manner consistent with the Dodd-Frank Wall Street Reform and Consumer Protection Act of 2010 and Barnett Bank of Marion Cty., N.A. v. Nelson.

Court membership
- Chief Justice John Roberts Associate Justices Clarence Thomas · Samuel Alito; Sonia Sotomayor · Elena Kagan; Neil Gorsuch · Brett Kavanaugh; Amy Coney Barrett · Ketanji Brown Jackson

Case opinion
- Majority: Kavanaugh, joined by unanimous

Laws applied
- Dodd-Frank Wall Street Reform and Consumer Protection Act of 2010 and Barnett Bank of Marion County, N.A. v. Nelson

Cantero v. Bank of America, N.A., 602 U.S. 205 (2024), was a United States Supreme Court case in which the Court held that the Second Circuit Court of Appeals failed to analyze whether New York’s interest-on-escrow law was preempted as applied to national banks in a manner consistent with the Dodd-Frank Wall Street Reform and Consumer Protection Act of 2010 and Barnett Bank of Marion County, N.A. v. Nelson.
