= O'Connor-Ratcliff v. Garnier =

- Supreme Court of the United States

Argued November 1, 2023 Decided March 15, 2024
- Full case name: Michelle O'Connor-Ratcliff, et al. v. Christopher Garnier, et ux.
- Docket no.: 22-324
- Citations: 601 U.S. 205 (more)
- Argument: Oral argument
- Decision: Opinion

Case history
- Prior: Garnier v. O'Connor-Ratcliff, 513 F. Supp. 3d 1229 (S.D. Cal. 2021); Garnier v. O'Connor-Ratcliff, Zane, 41 F.4th 1158 (9th Cir. 2022)

Holding
- The judgment of the Ninth Circuit is vacated and the case is remanded for further consideration in light of Lindke v. Freed.

Court membership
- Chief Justice John Roberts Associate Justices Clarence Thomas · Samuel Alito; Sonia Sotomayor · Elena Kagan; Neil Gorsuch · Brett Kavanaugh; Amy Coney Barrett · Ketanji Brown Jackson

Case opinion
- Per curiam

O'Connor-Ratcliff v. Garnier, 601 U.S. 205 (2024), is United States Supreme Court case regarding the First Amendment. The dispute concerned individuals who were blocked from a public official's personal social media account on which that official sometimes spoke about government business. The blocked individuals asserted that their blocks constituted state action subject to the First Amendment and civil rights litigation.

In a per curiam opinion, the High Court remanded the case back to the Ninth Circuit for further consideration in light of the decision in a similar case that was decided on the same day, Lindke v. Freed.

== Background ==
In 2014, petitioners Michelle O'Connor-Ratcliff and T.J. Zane successfully ran for election to the Board of Trustees of the Poway Unified School District (PUSD), located in Poway, California. In addition to personal accounts, the petitioners also created public accounts on Facebook and Twitter to promote their campaigns. After they were elected, they continued to use these accounts to post content related to PUSD business and activities of the Board. This included information about achievements of students and faculty, reminders about Board meetings, and matters of public safety and security at PUSD.

Respondents Christopher and Kimberly Garnier are parents with children attending PUSD schools. For years, the Garniers had been active members of the PUSD community and had often been critical of the Board. They voiced their concerns at public meetings of the Board of Trustees, in emails, and in-person at meetings with individual trustees. As they became unsatisfied with the results of these communications, the Garniers began to comment on Trustees' social media posts. Respondents' comments never included profanity or threatening language, and were nearly always related to PUSD matters. However, the length and repetitive nature of the comments became frustrating to O'Connor-Ratcliff and Zane. For example, Christopher Garnier had once left near-identical comments on 42 separate posts on O'Connor-Ratcliff's Facebook page. He had also left 226 identical replies over the span of 10 minutes to each tweet O'Connor-Ratcliff had ever posted on her public Twitter account.

At first, O'Connor-Ratcliff and Zane began to hide or delete individual comments from their Facebook pages. As this grew onerous, they blocked the Garniers from their social media accounts. Sometime after, they also implemented "word filters" on their Facebook accounts, effectively precluding members of the public from leaving verbal reactions, but not from liking a post or otherwise reacting in a nonverbal way. Since they were blocked, the Garniers were unable to interact with the posts in nonverbal ways.

After they were blocked, the Garniers sued under § 1983 of the United States Code, pertaining to civil rights violations per an exercise of state power, and sought injunctive and declaratory relief, alleging a violation of the First Amendment. The United States District Court for the Southern District of California ruled in favor of the Garniers, granting declaratory and injunctive relief. The United States Court of Appeals for the Ninth Circuit affirmed the District Court ruling.O'Connor-Ratcliff and Zane then requested an appeal at the United States Supreme Court.

== Supreme Court ==
A previous case, Knight First Amendment Institute v. Trump, related to Donald Trump's practice of blocking users from his personal Twitter account while he served as president. The Second Circuit ruled that Trump's account was considered a public forum and users could not be blocked. The case was appealed to the Supreme Court at the end of 2020, but with Trump leaving office in January 2021, the Supreme Court ruled that the case was rendered moot.

O'Connor-Ratcliff and Zane petitioned the Supreme Court to hear their case on October 4, 2022. The Supreme Court decided to revisit the issue, particularly because the previous Knight ruling, which despite being deemed moot, had revealed a circuit split on the topic of blocked social media accounts for politicians. On April 24, 2023, the High Court granted certiorari. On March 15, 2024, in a per curiam opinion, the court remanded O'Connor-Ratcliff v. Garnier back to the Ninth Circuit for further consideration in light of the decision in the releted case Lindke v. Freed, which was decided on the same day.

On May 14, 2025, The Ninth Circuit affirmed its previous ruling in the case, determining that blocking users from a politician's social media account constituted state action with First Amendment implications, with the opinion strengthed by the Lindke precedent.
