= Brandon Neely =

Former Guantanamo Bay guard

Brandon Neely is a former United States Army guard at the Guantanamo Bay detention camp, in Cuba. Neely is notable for agreeing to be interviewed by the Center for the Study of Human Rights in the Americas.

Neely declined to respond to a recall to active duty from the Individual Ready Reserve in 2007. Neely reported that, after receiving letters from the Department of Defense, he was sent an honorable discharge from the Army Reserve.

In January 2010, Neely flew to the United Kingdom and met with former captives. Neely and Ruhal Ahmed and Shafiq Rasul reconnected in 2009 via Rasul's Facebook page. The BBC Radio was scheduled to air a documentary about the meeting on January 14, 2010.

== Guantanamo duty ==
Neely was a guard at Guantanamo for the first six months the camp was open, and described feeling guilty for the brutal treatment captives received at that time.

In an interview with Center for the Study of Human Rights in the Americas Neely said that he and another guard experienced the first resistant prisoner for whom a "code red" (a euphemism for a violent extrajudicial punishment) was called, calling in the camp's first use of its immediate reaction force. He described how he and the other guard were trying to get a captive to kneel, so they could remove the captive's shackles. He could feel the captive trembling, and his body tense up. He and the other guard threw the elderly man to his cell's concrete floor, and called for the immediate reaction force. Neely described learning later that the reason the captive was shaking, and his body was so tense, was that he believed he was being made to kneel in preparation for his summary execution—a bullet to the back of the head.

Neely described watching a medic calling upon the immediate reaction force to hold an underweight captive immobile so he could force him to drink a can of Ensure. When the captive wouldn't open his mouth, Neely said the medic asked Neely to move, and then punched the captive twice in the face. Neely said he only realized afterwards that the medic had him move to a point where Neely's body blocked the medics punches from the guards in the guard tower. He said he later learned that the captive resisted drinking the diet supplement because he feared it was poisonous.

Neely said that he saw camp medical staff perform a digital rectal examination, searching for contraband, without first lubricating their fingers, and that this made the captive scream in pain.

Neely said that it had been a friend of his who was the first guard the captives saw drop a Qur'an on the ground. He said that this incident upset the captives so much it triggered a camp-wide hunger strike. While the Colonel in command of their unit said the guard who dropped the Qur'an would be punished, his friend was never punished.

Neely said that female guards used to regularly take their turns escorting captives to the open-air showers, and that the captives felt humiliated to be exposed, naked, in front of the female guard.

Neely said that camp authorities told the guards they could not leave Guantanamo for their next assignment unless they signed a confidentiality agreement, promising not to give interviews about Guantanamo, or to write about their experiences there themselves.

== Civilian life ==
Brandon Neely is the former president of the Houston chapter of Iraq Veterans Against the War.

Brandon Neely resigned from IVAW in early 2008 citing IVAW was becoming radical and anti-American.

Neely, 29, had left the US military in 2005 to become a police officer and was still struggling to come to terms with his time as a guard at Guantanamo.

Neely is one of seven Twitter users suing U.S. President Donald Trump for being blocked from his @realDonaldTrump personal account. The Knight First Amendment Institute v. Trump lawsuit was filed on July 11, 2017 — see section § Later developments for any official judgements handed down in the case thus far.
