= National Association of Convenience Stores =

National Association Of Convenience Stores Inc
- Abbreviation: NACS
- Formation: Tax-exempt since February 1963; 63 years ago
- Type: 501(c)(6)
- Tax ID no.: EIN: 952237749
- Headquarters: Alexandria, Virginia
- President & CEO: Henry Ogden Armour
- Executive VP, COO And CFO: Brian E Kimmel
- Sr. V.P., Government Relations: Lyle K Beckwith
- General Counsel: Douglas Stephen Kantor
- Revenue: US$61,836,797 (2024)
- Expenses: US$60,431,961 (2024)
- Website: www.convenience.org

The National Association of Convenience Stores (NACS) is a trade association representing the convenience and fuel retailing industry. Founded in 1961, NACS has thousands of member companies, primarily in the United States but also in about 50 other countries. NACS conducts market research, hosts conferences and trade shows, and conducts political and legal advocacy. NACS is particularly concerned with the regulation of motor fuels, high credit card swipe fees, and labor law.

== Mission and history ==
NACS serves the convenience store and fuel-retailing industry through market research, conferences and trade shows, political advocacy, and legal action. NACS was founded on August 14, 1961. In 2007, the association shortened its name to NACS and added a qualifying statement that better defines its presence both internationally and at the retail fueling level: "The Association for Convenience and Petroleum Retailing." In 2010, this statement was further revised to: "The Association for Convenience and Fuel Retailing."

=== Membership ===
NACS is an international trade association representing more than 2,100 retail and 1,500 supplier company members. NACS members do business in nearly 50 countries worldwide, with the majority of members from the United States. While 49 of the top 50 convenience store chains in the United States are members of NACS, the majority of its members are small, independent operations. About 70 percent of its total membership consists of companies that operate ten stores or less; This is typical for the convenience store industry. Of the 145,000 convenience stores in the United States, 62 percent are operated by owners with only a single location.

2011 in-store sales grew 2.4%, reaching a record $195.0 billion. Combined with $486.9 billion in motor fuels sales, total convenience store sales in201 2011 were $681.9 billion, or one out of every 22 dollars of the overall $15.04 trillion U.S. gross domestic product.

The U.S. convenience store industry, with more than 146,000 stores, posted $575.6 billion in total sales with $385.3 billion in motor fuels in 2010.

== Political advocacy ==
=== Motor fuels ===
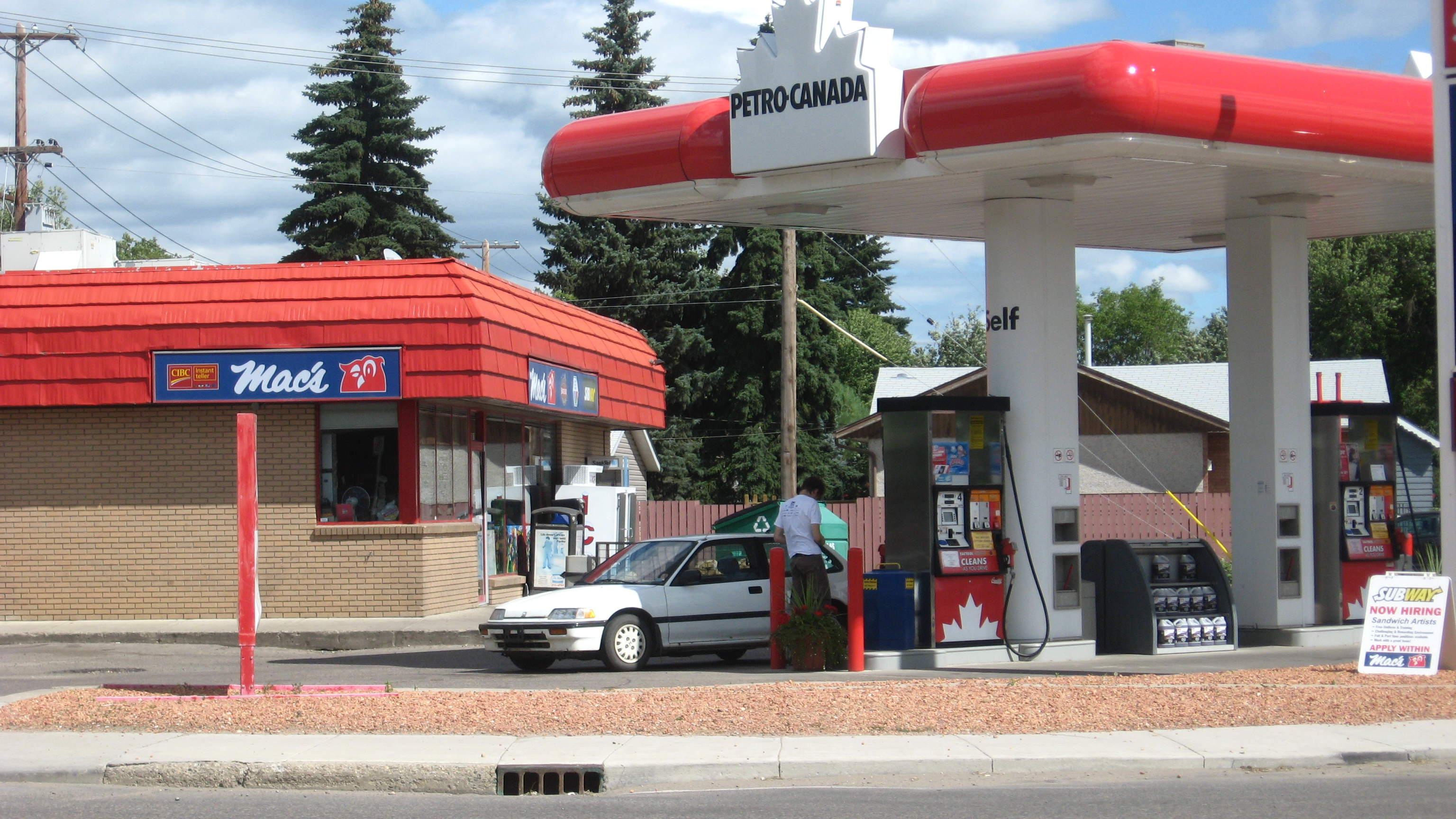
A gas station with convenience store in Saskatoon

In order to address what it calls "a number of legal challenges" to selling new types of fuel, NACS strongly supports the Domestic Fuels Protection Act of 2013. The Act is designed to offer retailers more flexibility and legal protection so that they can offer their customers more choices.

=== Swipe fees ===
==== Legal action on credit card swipe fees ====
About 8 million businesses have received notices about the proposed settlement and they have until May 28, 2013, to opt out or object. If a retailer does not meet this deadline the court will assume that they agree to the settlement. NACS launched a website to help retailers express their opposition to the proposed settlement or opt-out in an easy manner. Objections from class members will be considered during a court hearing in September 2013. All retailers that accepted Visa or MasterCard-branded credit cards between January 1, 2004, and November 27, 2012, are eligible class members.

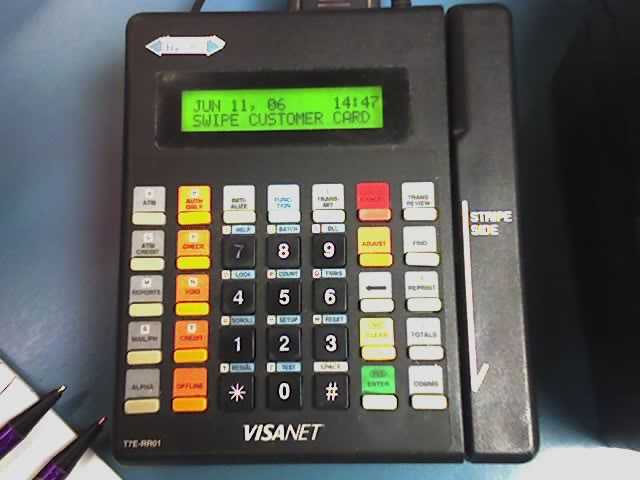
Credit card terminal

==== Suit against the Federal Reserve on debit card swipe fees ====
NACS, along with other trade groups such as the National Retail Federation and the National Restaurant Association, brought suit against the Federal Reserve for seeing the cap on debit card swipe fees at 24 cents per transaction. Debit card swipe fees were previously unregulated and averaged about 44 cents per transaction. Initially, the Federal Reserve planned to impose a 12-cent limit. NACS said that the Federal Reserve gave into pressure from banking lobbyists when it decided to double the cap. The plaintiffs argued that the 24-cent cap is an "unreasonable interpretation" of the 2010 law, often called the Durbin Amendment, mandating a cap on debit card swipe fees.

The Durbin Amendment, passed as part of the Dodd-Frank financial reform legislation in 2010, required the Federal Reserve to limit fees charged to retailers for debit card processing. The rule that the Federal Reserve issued went into effect on October 1, 2012, and allowed non-exempt card issuers to charge a one-cent fraud prevention fee to merchants in addition to another 0.7 percent for fraud prevention already included in the interchange fee. NACS and other plaintiffs argued that this rule was unfair as the Durbin Amendment required the Federal Reserve to ensure that banks take effective steps against fraud and determine how much of the cost banks should bear themselves. The MPC said that banks should actually have to reduce fraud before receiving more funds. The plaintiffs pointed out that the common practice of having customers merely signing for debit card purchases processed through the Visa and MasterCard payment networks instead of requiring a PIN greatly increases fraud.

In July 2013, U.S. District Court Judge Richard Leon ruled in favor of the plaintiffs. He ruled that the Federal Reserve did not have the authority to set the limit in the manner it in 2011 by improperly including factoring banks expenses into the rule in a way the law did not allow, resulting in the cap being set too high. The Federal Reserve was ordered to write a new rule. In the meantime, the 24-cent cap remains in effect. The judge's opinion was generally scathing and noted that the agency overruled its own staff, who had recommended a cap of 12 cents per transaction. The judge wrote, "The court concludes that the [Federal Reserve] Board has clearly disregarded Congress' statutory intent by inappropriately inflating all debit-card transaction fees by billions of dollars." The judge also ruled that the Federal Reserve failed to ensure that merchants enjoy access to "multiple unaffiliated networks" to process each debit-card transaction, as also required by the Durbin Amendment.

=== Labor law ===
The convenience store industry employs 1.73 million workers in the United States. Labor costs are the industry's largest expense. NACS works with legislators and regulators on labor issues to ensure that retailers can keep labor costs at reasonable levels.

== Publications and services ==
Each February 2, in anticipation of the seasonal transition to summer-blend fuels, NACS publishes its online gas price kit, which examines consumer perceptions about gas prices, the conditions that affect gas prices, and dozens of resources and data that explain the gasoline retail marketplace. NACS produces a variety of products to help retailers grow their businesses, from research and marketing to human resources support to category management. NACS has several industry-specific reports and programs that measure the industry’s performance. The NACS State of the Industry Report is the industry’s premier benchmark and is the most comprehensive collection of firm-level, store-level, and category data on convenience stores. CSX is the largest purpose-built online database of financial and operating data in the industry. The Consumer Tracking Program is a store-level shopper entry and exit research and insight program.

== Events ==
=== NACS Show ===
The NACS Show, Typically held in October, is the industry’s signature event. In addition to NACS, the event features strategic alliances with the Petroleum Marketers Association of America (PMAA) and Petroleum Equipment Institute (PEI). Typically drawing more than 22,000 attendees and 1,200 exhibitors which cover nearly 400,000 net square feet, it rotates between three cities: Las Vegas, Chicago and Atlanta. The event also features over 60 workshops and three general sessions. Due to the international nature of attendees, selects NACS Show events are translated into foreign languages such as Portuguese, Spanish, and Chinese. The NACS Show is considered a "buying show" as it typically ranks first in the country among all shows with respect to attendees' ability to recommend or make purchases, based on data collected by Exhibitor Surveys Inc.

== See also ==
- Convenience store – Small store that stocks a range of everyday items
- List of convenience stores – Convenience store chains around the world
