= Lindke v. Freed =

- Supreme Court of the United States

Argued October 31, 2023 Decided March 15, 2024
- Full case name: Kevin Lindke v. James R. Freed
- Docket no.: 22-661
- Citations: 601 U.S. 187 (more)
- Argument: Oral argument
- Decision: Opinion

Holding
- A public official who prevents someone from commenting on the official's social-media page engages in state action under §1983 only if the official both (1) possessed actual authority to speak on the State's behalf on a particular matter, and (2) purported to exercise that authority when speaking in the relevant social-media posts.

Court membership
- Chief Justice John Roberts Associate Justices Clarence Thomas · Samuel Alito; Sonia Sotomayor · Elena Kagan; Neil Gorsuch · Brett Kavanaugh; Amy Coney Barrett · Ketanji Brown Jackson

Case opinion
- Majority: Barrett, joined by unanimous

Lindke v. Freed, 601 U.S. 187 (2024), is a United States Supreme Court case regarding the First Amendment. The dispute concerned individuals who were blocked from a public official's personal social media account on which that official sometimes spoke about government business. The blocked individual asserted that the blocks constituted state action subject to the First Amendment and civil rights litigation. In a unanimous decision, the High Court held that speech made by a public official on a private social media account is not an official exercise of government power, so the politician can block users or delete their comments, unless that politician has authority to speak on the government's behalf and purports to do so in the posts at issue.

== Background ==
The case originated when James Freed, City Manager for Port Huron, Michigan, used his personal Facebook account to post both personal and job-related comments about the COVID-19 pandemic. His job-related comments pertained to a city hiring freeze during the pandemic. Kevin Lindke, a resident of Port Huron, responded to Freed’s posts, complaining about the city’s overall pandemic response and criticizing the actions of city leaders. Freed deleted Lindke’s comments and later blocked Lindke from commenting altogether. In 2021, Lindke sued Freed in the United States District Court for the Eastern District of Michigan, under § 1983 of the United States Code, pertaining to civil rights violations per an exercise of state power, with an alleged violation of the First Amendment to the U.S. Constitution. Freed requested a summary judgment in his favor, arguing that he rarely used the Facebook account at issue and that his posts did not constitute state action. The court granted this request and rendered Lindke's complaint moot.

Lindke appealed to the Sixth Circuit in 2022. That court affirmed the District Court ruling, in that there was no evidence that Freed's activities in his Facebook account were state action with implications for civil or constitutional rights. The Circuit Court determined, among other criteria, that such a social media account should be managed by the office, rather than an individual office holder, for posts and blocking actions to be considered exercises of government authority. Lindke then appealed again to the United States Supreme Court, which granted certiorari in October 2023.

== Supreme Court ruling ==
A previous case, Knight First Amendment Institute v. Trump, related to Donald Trump's practice of blocking users from his personal Twitter account while he served as president. The Second Circuit ruled that Trump's account was considered a public forum and users could not be blocked. The case was appealed to the Supreme Court at the end of 2020, but with Trump leaving office in January 2021, the Supreme Court ruled that the case was rendered moot.

The Supreme Court decided to revisit the issue upon the subsequent dispute in the Lindke case, particularly because the previous Knight ruling, which despite being deemed moot, had revealed a circuit split on the topic of blocked social media accounts for politicians.

In a departure from the Circuit Court analysis in Knight, and the determinations by the lower courts in Lindke, the High Court formulated a new analysis to determine if government officials can block users from their social media accounts. The court postulated that a politician, when blocking someone from their social media account, has only committed state action if the official both (1) possessed actual authority to speak on the State's behalf on a particular matter, and (2) purported to exercise that authority when speaking in the relevant social-media posts.

The court differentiated this test from the simpler version used by the Sixth Circuit in favor of James Freed, and remanded the case back to that court to determine if Freed had indeed committed state action, with civil rights and constitutional implications, under this higher standard. While this decision favored Freed in the instant dispute, commentators noted that the outcome is likely to create uncertainty for both political officials who choose to discuss government business in their personal social media accounts, and for citizens who have been blocked by those same politicians, who now face an onerous task in arguing that such a block constitutes state action. The ruling was also critiqued for its brevity, addressing only the particular actions of Freed while evading the wider implications of the decision.

The Lindke case was decided by the Supreme Court on the same day as a related case brought by individuals who had been blocked from interacting with politicians' social media accounts. That case, O'Connor-Ratcliff v. Garnier, was remanded to a lower court for further consideration after the Supreme Court's ruling in Lindke.
