= McIntosh v. United States =

- Supreme Court of the United States

Argued February 27, 2024 Decided April 17, 2024
- Full case name: Louis McIntosh v. United States
- Docket no.: 22-7386
- Citations: 601 U.S. 330 (more)
- Argument: Oral argument
- Decision: Opinion

Holding
- A court's failure to enter a preliminary order imposing criminal forfeiture before sentencing does not necessarily bar a judge from ordering forfeiture at sentencing.

Court membership
- Chief Justice John Roberts Associate Justices Clarence Thomas · Samuel Alito; Sonia Sotomayor · Elena Kagan; Neil Gorsuch · Brett Kavanaugh; Amy Coney Barrett · Ketanji Brown Jackson

Case opinion
- Majority: Sotomayor, joined by unanimous

Laws applied
- Fed. R. Crim. P. 32.2(b)(2)(B)

McIntosh v. United States, 601 U.S. 330 (2024), was a United States Supreme Court case in which the Court held that a court's failure to enter a preliminary order imposing criminal forfeiture before sentencing does not necessarily bar a judge from ordering forfeiture at sentencing.
