= Warner Chappell Music, Inc. v. Nealy =

- Supreme Court of the United States

Decided May 9, 2024
- Full case name: Warner Chappell Music, Inc. v. Nealy
- Docket no.: 22-1078
- Citations: 601 U.S. 366 (more)

Holding
- Assuming the discovery rule applies to copyright infringement, the three-year statute of limitations for an infringement suit does not prevent recovery.

Court membership
- Chief Justice John Roberts Associate Justices Clarence Thomas · Samuel Alito; Sonia Sotomayor · Elena Kagan; Neil Gorsuch · Brett Kavanaugh; Amy Coney Barrett · Ketanji Brown Jackson

Case opinions
- Majority: Kagan, joined by Roberts, Sotomayor, Kavanaugh, Barrett, Jackson
- Dissent: Gorsuch, joined by Thomas, Alito

Warner Chappell Music, Inc. v. Nealy, 601 U.S. 366 (2024), was a United States Supreme Court case in which the Court held that, assuming the discovery rule applies to copyright infringement, the three-year statute of limitations for an infringement suit does not prevent recovery.

In dissent, Justice Neil Gorsuch criticized the majority for the assumption at the heart of this case. In his view, the discovery rule "almost certainly" does not apply to copyright infringement. Even if a future court would agree that it does, Gorsuch said, "Nothing requires us to play along with these particular parties and expound on the details of a rule of law that they may assume but very likely does not exist."
