= Courthouse News Service =

News service focused on civil litigation

- Industry: Publishing
- Genre: Civil litigation
- Headquarters: Pasadena, California, United States
- Products: News service; Print reports
- Website: www.courthousenews.com

Courthouse News Service is an American news service primarily focusing on civil litigation. It offers both free and paid services. Its core audience is lawyers and law firms, who subscribe to the service; other subscribers include nonprofits, government agencies, corporations, other media outlets, and academic institutions.

Courthouse News has reporters across the United States who cover proceedings in state and federal trial courts and appellate courts for its non-paywalled public website. Its reporters also cover federal and state legislation and congressional activity. It is a member of the Senate Press Gallery.

In addition to digital print journalism, Courthouse News produces a podcast called Sidebar. It launched in May 2021.

== Paid subscription service ==
Unlike CourtExpress and CourtLink, Courthouse News Service does not provide comprehensive docket information; rather, it alerts paid subscribers to new filings and rulings.

As of 2020, the service had more than 2,200 subscribers. It is a competitor to Thomson Reuters, LexisNexis, and Bloomberg.

== History and awards ==
Courthouse News Service was founded in 1990 by Bill Girdner, who remains the news agency's owner and editor. It is based in Pasadena, California.

During the COVID-19 pandemic, the group received between $2 million and $5 million in federally backed small business loans from City National Bank as part of the Paycheck Protection Program. The organization stated that the money would help it retain 256 employees.

In 2023, Girdner received the James Madison Award for his First Amendment court victories.

== Press access litigation ==
Courthouse News Service has been the plaintiff in numerous First Amendment court cases seeking quicker access to new complaint filings.

=== Idaho ===
In 2024, Courthouse News Service won a key victory in the Northwest where a federal judge handed down a broad ruling that enjoined Idaho’s top court official from withholding public documents.

=== Ohio ===
In March of 2023, U.S. District Judge Sarah Morrison ordered the Franklin County court clerk Columbus, Ohio to stop withholding e-filed complaints from public view during a clerk review process, as a result of litigation filed by Courthouse News Service.

=== Vermont ===
A federal judge in November 2021 enjoined Vermont court clerks from withholding access to e-filed complaints. She decided in favor of news outlets contesting an access blackout while clerks review and process new court filings.

=== Other states ===
Courthouse News has also secured injunctions over press access battles in Virginia, Illinois, New York, Texas, and California.
