= Department of Agriculture Rural Development Rural Housing Service v. Kirtz =

- Supreme Court of the United States

Argued Nov. 26, 2023 Decided Feb. 8, 2024
- Full case name: United States Department of Agriculture Rural Development Rural Housing Service v. Reginald Kirtz
- Docket no.: 22-846
- Citations: 601 U.S. 42 (more)
- Argument: Oral argument
- Opinion announcement: Opinion announcement

Case history
- Prior: Motion to dismiss granted, Kirtz v. Trans Union, LLC, No. 20-5231, 2021 U.S. Dist. LEXIS 84912 (E.D. Pa. May 4, 2021).; Reversed; 46 F.4th 159 (3d Cir. 2022); Cert granted, 143 S. Ct. 2636 (2023).

Questions presented
- Whether the civil-liability provisions of the Fair Credit Reporting Act, 15 U.S.C. 1681 et seq., unequivocally and unambiguously waive the sovereign immunity of the United States.

Holding
- Yes, the FCRA waives the sovereign immunity of the United States

Court membership
- Chief Justice John Roberts Associate Justices Clarence Thomas · Samuel Alito; Sonia Sotomayor · Elena Kagan; Neil Gorsuch · Brett Kavanaugh; Amy Coney Barrett · Ketanji Brown Jackson

Case opinion
- Majority: Gorsuch, joined by unanimous

Laws applied
- Fair Credit Reporting Act

Department of Agriculture Rural Development Rural Housing Service v. Kirtz, 601 U.S. 42 (2024), is a United States Supreme Court case holding that the Fair Credit Reporting Act unequivocally and unambiguously waives the sovereign immunity of the United States.

The case came from a 2022 decision by the United States Court of Appeals for the Third Circuit which joined the D.C. and Seventh circuits in holding that the relevant provisions of the Fair Credit Reporting Act unequivocally and unambiguously waive the sovereign immunity of the United States.

== Background ==
Reginald Kirtz had two loans, one by the Pennsylvania Higher Education Assistance Agency, and one by the Department of Agriculture Rural Development Rural Housing Service, both of which were closed and had a balance of $0. Despite this, both agencies reported to Trans Union that he was more than 120 days past due, resulting in a lower credit score. Kirtz sent a letter to Trans Union disputing the statements on his credit file, and Trans Union gave notice of the dispute to both agencies. Neither agency took action to investigate or correct the disputed information.

== Procedural history ==
Kirtz sued Trans Union, the Pennsylvania Higher Education Assistance Agency, and the Department of Agriculture Rural Development Rural Housing Service, alleging willful and negligent violations of sections 1681n and 1681o of the Fair Credit Reporting Act in the United States District Court for the Eastern District of Pennsylvania. The U.S. Department of Agriculture moved to dismiss the claim, arguing that it is protected by the sovereign immunity of the United States. The district court granted the motion to dismiss, but was reversed by the United States Court of Appeals for the Third Circuit.

The relevant sections of the Fair Credit Reporting act state that any "person" who either negligently or willfully "fail[s] to comply with any requirement imposed under [the FCRA] with respect to any consumer is liable to that consumer" for civil damages. A "person" is defined to included "any government or government subdivision or agency." The Third Circuit joined the D.C. and Seventh Circuits in finding that language unequivocally and unambiguously waived the sovereign immunity of the United States.

== Supreme Court ==
On March 3, 2023, the USDA petitioned the Supreme Court to hear its case. On June 20, 2023, the court granted certiorari. It was argued on November 6, 2023.

On February 8, 2024, Justice Gorsuch delivered a unanimous opinion holding that the Fair Credit Reporting Act expressly waives the sovereign immunity of the United States. The decision affirmed the Third Circuit ruling below.
