= Smith v. Arizona =

- Supreme Court of the United States

Argued January 10, 2024 Decided June 21, 2024
- Full case name: Jason Smith v. State of Arizona
- Docket no.: 22-899
- Citations: 602 U.S. 779 (more)
- Argument: Oral argument

Case history
- Prior: judgement for the defendant, State v. Smith; Arizona Court of Appeals, 1 CA-CR-21-051; Certiorari granted on September 29, 2023
- Subsequent: Vacated and remanded

Questions presented
- Does the Confrontation Clause of the Sixth Amendment permit the prosecution in a criminal trial to present testimony by a substitute expert conveying the testimonial statements of a non-testifying forensic analyst?

Holding
- When an expert conveys an absent analyst's statements in support of the expert's opinion, and the statements provide that support only if true, then the statements come into evidence for their truth.

Court membership
- Chief Justice John Roberts Associate Justices Clarence Thomas · Samuel Alito; Sonia Sotomayor · Elena Kagan; Neil Gorsuch · Brett Kavanaugh; Amy Coney Barrett · Ketanji Brown Jackson

Case opinions
- Majority: Kagan, joined by Sotomayor, Kavanaugh, Barrett, Jackson; Thomas, Gorsuch (parts I, II, IV)
- Concurrence: Thomas (in part)
- Concurrence: Gorsuch (in part)
- Concurrence: Alito (in judgement), joined by Roberts

Laws applied
- Const. Amend. VI

Smith v. Arizona, 602 U.S. 779 (2024), is a decision of the Supreme Court of the United States case in which the court held that when an expert conveys an absent analyst's statements in support of the expert's opinion, and the statements provide that support only if true, then the statements come into evidence for their truth.

The case revolves around Jason Smith, who was charged with five-related drug offenses, including possession of methamphetamine and marijuana with intent to sell. Smith pleaded not guilty to all charges. Elizabeth Rast, a forensic scientist from the Department of Public Safety (DPS), performed the laboratory analysis of the substances, but did not testify at the trial. Another DPS scientist named Greggory Longoni testified at the trial while referencing Rast's notes. Smith was convicted and sentenced to four years of imprisonment. Smith appealed to the Arizona Court of Appeals, arguing that Longoni's testimony violated his constitutional right to confront witnesses against him under the Confrontation Clause. The court affirmed his conviction.

In a unanimous decision, Justice Elena Kagan wrote the majority opinion.

== Background ==
In December 2019, around 6:30 A.M., police officers with the Yuma County Narcotics Task Force arrived at Smith's father's house in Yuma County, Arizona to conduct a search warrant. A double-wide trailer, two travel trailers and a shed was found on the property, when the authorities approached a shed, they smelled an "overwhelming odor of fresh marijuana and burnt marijuana", After the officers ordered Smith to turn around and put his hands on the back, an officer had to remove him forcibly from the shed. When the officers took him to the ground to detain him, he refused to put his hand to his back and yelling that the officers were "illegally trespassing" and "harassing" him. When the officers placed him into the patrol vehicle, the officers also detained eleven individuals from the property, including two individuals who had been in the shed and Smith's father who was ill and needed to be under medical supervision. Once inside the shed, the officers described the room turned into a "makeshift room", containing a bed, a couch, a workbench, a cabinet, a small refrigerator and scattered clothes. During their search, they found six pounds of marijuana on the ceiling, ten grams of marijuana in a dish, they also discovered marijuana in various jars, a meth pipe, a marijuana flower, cannabis wax and methamphetamine. The Superior Court of Yuma County charged him of five counts of felonies, including the possessing of dangerous drugs with intended to sale, and was sentenced in four years of imprisonment.
