= Harrow v. Department of Defense =

- Supreme Court of the United States

Decided May 16, 2024
- Full case name: Harrow v. Department of Defense
- Docket no.: 23-21
- Citations: 601 U.S. 480 (more)

Holding
- The 60-day filing deadline for appeals of decisions by the Merit Systems Protection Board is not jurisdictional, so courts have discretion to equitably toll it.

Court membership
- Chief Justice John Roberts Associate Justices Clarence Thomas · Samuel Alito; Sonia Sotomayor · Elena Kagan; Neil Gorsuch · Brett Kavanaugh; Amy Coney Barrett · Ketanji Brown Jackson

Case opinion
- Majority: Kagan, joined by unanimous

Laws applied
- Civil Service Reform Act of 1978

Harrow v. Department of Defense, 601 U.S. 480 (2024), was a United States Supreme Court case in which the Court held that the 60-day filing deadline for appeals of decisions by the Merit Systems Protection Board is not jurisdictional, so courts have discretion to equitably toll it.
