= National Rifle Association of America v. Vullo =

- Supreme Court of the United States

Argued March 18, 2024 Decided May 30, 2024
- Full case name: National Rifle Association of America v. Maria T. Vullo
- Docket no.: 22-842
- Citations: 602 U.S. 175 (more)

Case history
- Prior: 49 F. 4th 700 (CA2 2022)

Questions presented
- Does the First Amendment allow a government regulator to threaten regulated entities with adverse regulatory actions if they do business with a controversial speaker, as a consequence of (a) the government's own hostility to the speaker's viewpoint or (b) a perceived "general backlash" against the speaker's advocacy?

Holding
- The NRA plausibly alleged that respondent violated the First Amendment by coercing regulated entities to terminate their business relationships with the NRA in order to punish or suppress gun-promotion advocacy.

Court membership
- Chief Justice John Roberts Associate Justices Clarence Thomas · Samuel Alito; Sonia Sotomayor · Elena Kagan; Neil Gorsuch · Brett Kavanaugh; Amy Coney Barrett · Ketanji Brown Jackson

Case opinions
- Majority: Sotomayor, joined by unanimous
- Concurrence: Gorsuch
- Concurrence: Jackson

Laws applied
- U.S. Const. amend. I

National Rifle Association of America v. Vullo, 602 U.S. 175 (2024), is a United States Supreme Court case unanimously ruling that if Maria T. Vullo, the former director of the New York State Department of Financial Services (DFS), attempted to coerce financial institutions in the state to refrain from doing business with the National Rifle Association of America (NRA), then such conduct would violate the First Amendment to the United States Constitution.

== Background ==
Following the Parkland high school shooting, the superintendent of the New York State Department of Financial Services (DFS) Maria T. Vullo advised banks and insurance companies in the state of New York not to provide services to the National Rifle Association of America (NRA), an organization that lobbies in support of gun rights in the United States. The NRA sued Vullo, alleging a First Amendment violation. A three-judge panel of United States Court of Appeals for the Second Circuit ruled against the NRA, affirming a lower court's dismissal of the case. Judge Denny Chin wrote that while government officials may not "use their regulatory powers to coerce individuals or entities into refraining from protected speech ... government officials have a right – indeed, a duty – to address issues of public concern".

== Supreme Court ==
The NRA appealed the Second Circuit's decision, and the Supreme Court agreed to hear the case on November 3, 2023. The Supreme Court heard oral arguments on March 18, 2024. The NRA was represented by David D. Cole of the American Civil Liberties Union (ACLU), and Vullo was represented by former acting U.S. Solicitor General Neal Katyal.

The Court released its opinion on May 30, 2024, vacating the Second Circuit's decision and remanding the case to the lower court. Justice Sonia Sotomayor authored the Court's unanimous decision, favoring the NRA, stating that "[g]overnment officials cannot attempt to coerce private parties in order to punish or suppress views that the government disfavors". The decision further held that government officials cross the line into impermissible coercion when they engage in conduct "that, viewed in context, could be reasonably understood to convey a threat of adverse government action in order to punish or suppress speech". Justice Sotomayor explained that, "[a]t the heart of the First Amendment's Free Speech Clause is the recognition that viewpoint discrimination is uniquely harmful to a free and democratic society".

== Subsequent developments ==
Reconsidering the case following the Supreme Court's decision, the Second Circuit court found in July 2025 that Vullo was entitled to qualified immunity for her actions. This decision was based on the fact that Vullo's conduct would not have clearly been understood to have violated the protections of the First Amendment as had been established at the time of her actions, given that her actions were directed at third parties' nonexpressive conduct as opposed to that of a speaker or a conduit of speech such as a publisher.

Based on these findings, the Second Circuit remanded the case to the district court to dismiss the NRA's remaining claims.
