= Barnett Bank of Marion County, N.A. v. Nelson =

Barnett Bank of Marion Cty., N.A. vs. Nelson
- Supreme Court of the United States

Argued January 16, 1996 Decided March 27, 1996
- Full case name: Barnett Bank of Marion County, N.A. vs. Nelson, Florida Insurance Commissioner, et al.
- Citations: 517 U.S. 25 (more) 116 S. Ct. 1103; 134 L. Ed. 2d 237

Case history
- Prior: Barnett Bank of Marion County, N.A. v. Gallagher, 43 F.3d 631 (11th Cir. 1995)

Holding
- The court said states could manage national banks when “doing so does not prevent or significantly interfere with the national bank’s exercise of its powers" which is called conflict preemption.

Court membership
- Chief Justice William Rehnquist Associate Justices John P. Stevens · Sandra Day O'Connor; Antonin Scalia · Anthony Kennedy; David Souter · Clarence Thomas; Ruth Bader Ginsburg · Stephen Breyer

Case opinion
- Majority: Breyer, joined by unanimous

Laws applied
- Riege-Neal

Barnett Bank of Marion County, N.A. v. Nelson, 517 U.S. 25 (1996), is a Supreme court case that ruled that states could moderate national banks if doing so does not prevent or largely interfere with the national bank's ability to exercise its powers. Later, in 2004, the OCC (Office of the Comptroller of the Currency) authorized its preemption rule which declared that a national bank's ability to exert its incidental powers which include lending and deposit taking inhibited state laws that obstruct, impair or condition” the business of banking."

== Background ==
Under the National Bank Act, there is a dual banking system in the United States: a federal system based on national bank charters, and a state system formed on state charters. Under the act, a national bank association has the power to do what is necessary for its banking business.

In 1994, amongst a time of national bank expansion across state lines, Congress clearly declared its aim to create a path of freedom from state regulations by adopting the Riegle-Neal Interstate Banking and Branching Efficiency Act of 1994 (Riegle-Neal). This act sought a new preemption standard for national banks in America by administering that national banks were subject to state consumer laws as if they were sections of a state bank except when federal law preempted the application of a state law to a national bank or if the Office of the Comptroller of Currency (OCC) concluded that a state law inclined against national banks. Courts later held that the (Riegle-Neal) act gave the OCC the ability to apply state laws even if they were not prohibited.

A Florida law prohibited Florida-licensed insurance agents from engaging in certain insurance activities such as deposits and engage in any activity incidental to receiving deposits where the agent was related with, among other things, any bank than one which was not a subordinate or associate of a bank capital company, and was located in a city with a populace of less than 5000 people. Florida's Insurance Commissioner directed Barnett to stop selling the insurance at the branch because it was banned under state statue.

== See also ==
- National Bank Act
- Riegle-Neal Act
