= Connelly v. United States =

- Supreme Court of the United States

Decided Jun 6, 2024
- Full case name: Connelly v. United States
- Docket no.: 23-146
- Citations: 602 U.S. 257 (more) 144 S. Ct. 1406

Case history
- Prior: 70 F.4th 412 (8th Cir. 2023), aff'g 2021 WL 4281288 (E.D. Mo. Sept. 21, 2021)

Holding
- A corporation’s contractual obligation to redeem shares is not necessarily a liability that reduces a corporation’s value for purposes of the federal estate tax. When calculating the federal estate tax, the value of a decedent’s shares in a closely held corporation must reflect the corporation’s fair market value.

Court membership
- Chief Justice John Roberts Associate Justices Clarence Thomas · Samuel Alito; Sonia Sotomayor · Elena Kagan; Neil Gorsuch · Brett Kavanaugh; Amy Coney Barrett · Ketanji Brown Jackson

Case opinion
- Majority: Thomas, joined by unanimous

Connelly v. United States, 602 U.S. 257 (2024), was a United States Supreme Court case in which the Court held that a corporation's contractual obligation to redeem shares is not necessarily a liability that reduces a corporation's value for purposes of the federal estate tax. When calculating the federal estate tax, the value of a decedent's shares in a closely held corporation must reflect the corporation's fair market value. The Court affirmed the judgment of the United States Court of Appeals for the Eighth Circuit.
