= Consumer Financial Protection Bureau v. Community Financial Services Association of America, Ltd. =

- Supreme Court of the United States

Argued October 3, 2023 Decided May 16, 2024
- Full case name: Consumer Financial Protection Bureau v. Community Financial Services Association of America, Limited, et al.
- Docket no.: 22-448
- Citations: 601 U.S. 416 (more)
- Argument: Oral argument

Case history
- Prior: Summary judgment granted. Consumer Financial Services Association of America, Limited v. Consumer Financial Protection Bureau, 558 F. Supp. 3d 350 (W.D. Tex. 2021); Affirmed in part and reversed in part. 51 F.4th 616 (5th Cir. 2022).; Cert. granted. 598 U.S. ___ (2023).
- Subsequent: District court decision affirmed. 104 F.4th 930 (5th Cir. 2024).; Rehearing en banc denied (5th Cir. 2024).; Petition for cert. filed (U.S. Mar. 7, 2025).

Questions presented
- Whether the court of appeals erred in holding that the statute providing funding to the Consumer Financial Protection Bureau (CFPB), 12 U.S.C. 5497, violates the Appropriations Clause, U.S. Const. Art. I, § 9, Cl. 7, and in vacating a regulation promulgated at a time when the CFPB was receiving such funding.

Holding
- Congress’ statutory authorization allowing the Bureau to draw money from the earnings of the Federal Reserve System to carry out the Bureau’s duties satisfies the Appropriations Clause.

Court membership
- Chief Justice John Roberts Associate Justices Clarence Thomas · Samuel Alito; Sonia Sotomayor · Elena Kagan; Neil Gorsuch · Brett Kavanaugh; Amy Coney Barrett · Ketanji Brown Jackson

Case opinions
- Majority: Thomas, joined by Roberts, Sotomayor, Kagan, Kavanaugh, Barrett, Jackson
- Concurrence: Kagan, joined by Sotomayor, Kavanaugh, Barrett
- Concurrence: Jackson
- Dissent: Alito, joined by Gorsuch

Laws applied
- U.S. Const. art I, § 9, cl. 7

Consumer Financial Protection Bureau v. Community Financial Services Association of America, Ltd., 601 U.S. 416 (2024), was a United States Supreme Court case where the Court ruled that the funding mechanism of the Consumer Financial Protection Bureau (CFPB), which is allocated from the Federal Treasury budget rather that through Congressional appropriations, is constitutional under the Appropriations Clause.

== Background ==
=== Factual background ===
The CFPB was created after the 2008 financial crisis as part of the Dodd–Frank Wall Street Reform and Consumer Protection Act. While initially aimed to protect consumers from bad mortgage lenders that had partially created the financial crisis, the CFPB has also involved itself in other areas at high risk of fraudulent activity that harm consumers, such as credit cards, credit reporting, and for-profit colleges. As it is generally seen as pro-consumer, the CFPB had generally been contested by conservative politicians and large corporations.

One of the first legal challenges to the operations of the CFPB arose from the Supreme Court case Seila Law LLC v. Consumer Financial Protection Bureau (2020), which challenged the inability for the director of the CFPB to be removed by the president except for cause, and was argued by that nature, the whole of the CFPB was unconstitutional. The Supreme Court agreed that the director of the CFPB was considered an officer of the United States and thus could be removed by the president as to maintain the separation of powers, but otherwise the agency's structure was constitutional.

=== Legal background ===
The Community Financial Services Association of America (CFSA), a trade group for the payday lending industry, filed a lawsuit in 2018 challenging a CFPB rule restricting payday lending. The United States District Court for the Western District of Texas upheld the rule. The CFSA appealed to the United States Court of Appeals for the Fifth Circuit, which in October 2022 upheld the rule against an Administrative Procedure Act challenge, but held it must be vacated because it was created when the agency was funded by the Federal Reserve. The Fifth Circuit held this funding mechanism was unconstitutional.

== Supreme Court ==
Less than a month after the Fifth Circuit decided the case, the CFPB filed a petition for a writ of certiorari at the Supreme Court, and the Biden administration asked for the Supreme Court to "fast track" the case to be heard during the 2022 Supreme Court term. The Supreme Court granted certiorari on February 27, 2023, and denied the motion to expedite consideration of the case. Oral argument was held on October 3, 2023. The case was argued, on behalf of the CFPB, by Solicitor General Elizabeth Prelogar and, on behalf of the CFSA, by former Solicitor General Noel Francisco.

The Court ultimately ruled in favor of the CFPB in a 7–2 decision written by Justice Thomas.

== Subsequent activity ==
After the Supreme Court's judgment issued on June 17, 2024, the case was remanded back to the Fifth Circuit. On remand, the Fifth Circuit reinstated its prior opinion on the CFSA's alternative arguments.
