= Culley v. Marshall =

- Supreme Court of the United States

Argued October 30, 2023 Decided May 9, 2024
- Full case name: Halima Tariffa Culley, et al. v. Steven T. Marshall, Attorney General of Alabama, et al.
- Docket no.: 22-585
- Citations: 601 U.S. 377 (more)
- Argument: Oral argument
- Decision: Opinion

Case history
- Prior: 2022 WL 2663643; 2022 U.S. App. LEXIS 18975

Holding
- The Due Process Clause requires a timely civil-asset-forfeiture hearing but does not require a separate preliminary hearing.

Court membership
- Chief Justice John Roberts Associate Justices Clarence Thomas · Samuel Alito; Sonia Sotomayor · Elena Kagan; Neil Gorsuch · Brett Kavanaugh; Amy Coney Barrett · Ketanji Brown Jackson

Case opinions
- Majority: Kavanaugh, joined by Roberts, Thomas, Alito, Gorsuch, Barrett
- Concurrence: Gorsuch, joined by Thomas
- Dissent: Sotomayor, joined by Kagan, Jackson

Culley v. Marshall, 601 U.S. 377 (2024), is a case decided by Supreme Court of the United States regarding the timing of post-seizure probable cause hearings under the Due Process Clause of the 14th Amendment. The Court was asked to determine whether the "speedy trial" test from Barker v. Wingo or the balancing test from Mathews v. Eldridge applies to a judicial-forfeiture proceeding.

The case was on appeal from the United States Court of Appeals for the Eleventh Circuit.

== Background ==
On February 17, 2019, Halima Tariffa Culley's son was arrested while driving his mother's car. Police charged Culley with possession of marijuana and seized the car. Culley's mother was unable to recover the vehicle, and the State of Alabama filed a civil asset forfeiture case against the vehicle. 20 months later, Culley won summary judgment under Alabama's innocent-owner defense.

Culley then filed a class-action lawsuit under the Ku Klux Klan Act, alleging that Alabama officials had violated her right to a post-deprivation hearing under the 8th and 14th Amendments to the Constitution. The District Court found for Alabama and the 11th Circuit affirmed.

On October 30, 2023, the US Supreme Court heard oral arguments in Culley v. Marshall.

On May 9, 2024, the Court decided for the government. It held that "the Due Process Clause requires a timely forfeiture hearing but does not require a separate preliminary hearing". The majority opinion, written by Justice Brett Kavanaugh, based its conclusion on two prior Supreme Court decisions, United States v. Von Neumann and United States v. $8,850.
