= Ohio v. EPA =

Ohio v. Environmental Protection Agency Kinder Morgan, Inc. v. EPA American Forest & Paper Association v. EPA United States Steel Corporation v. EPA
- Supreme Court of the United States

Argued February 21, 2024 Decided June 27, 2024
- Full case name: Ohio, et al. v. Environmental Protection Agency, et al.; Kinder Morgan Inc., et al. v. EPA; American Forest & Paper Association, et al. v. EPA; United States Steel Corporation v. EPA, et al.
- Docket nos.: 23A349; 23A350; 23A351; 23A384
- Citations: 603 U.S. 279 (more)
- Argument: Oral argument

Questions presented
- (1) Whether the court should stay the Environmental Protection Agency’s federal emission reductions rule, the Good Neighbor Plan; and (2) whether the emissions controls imposed by the rule are reasonable regardless of the number of states subject to the rule.

Holding
- The applications for a stay are granted; enforcement of EPA’s rule against the applicants shall be stayed pending the disposition of the applicants’ petition for review in the D. C. Circuit and any petition for writ of certiorari, timely sought

Court membership
- Chief Justice John Roberts Associate Justices Clarence Thomas · Samuel Alito; Sonia Sotomayor · Elena Kagan; Neil Gorsuch · Brett Kavanaugh; Amy Coney Barrett · Ketanji Brown Jackson

Case opinions
- Majority: Gorsuch, joined by Roberts, Alito, Thomas, Kavanaugh
- Dissent: Barrett, joined by Sotomayor, Kagan, Jackson

Laws applied
- Clean Air Act

Ohio v. Environmental Protection Agency, 603 U.S. 279 (2024), is a United States Supreme Court case regarding the Clean Air Act.

== Background ==
The United States Clean Air Act is a law intended to reduce the impacts of air pollution. In the Clean Air Act, there is a section called the "Good Neighbor" provision, which mandates states to implement policies to reduce the impact of air pollution on other states, and to mitigate the impact of pollution on individuals with respiratory disorders, such as asthma or bronchitis. In October 2015, the Environmental Protection Agency set new standard for reduction of ozone pollution. This required states to submit State Implementation Plans (SIPs). In 2022, the EPA announced that it would be denying 23 states' SIPs. In response, the EPA proposed a Federal Implementation Plan that amended the National Ambient Air Quality Standards. Three plaintiffs, collectively referred to as "Ohio," filed an emergency appeal to the Supreme Court.

== Supreme Court ==
Ohio claimed that the EPA's federal implementation plan would put undue pressure on the U.S. electrical grid. The EPA argued that the plan contained important public benefits that if halted would cause delays in improving air quality that could be harmful. The EPA also argued that Ohio did not demonstrate any harm that would arise if the plan remained in effect while the legal proceedings continued. The Supreme Court did not put the EPA plan on hold while legal proceedings were underway. In a 5–4 decision, the Supreme Court decided that the EPA plan would be stayed pending petition for review and writ of certiorari.

=== Majority opinion ===
Neil Gorsuch delivered the opinion of the court, which John Roberts, Samuel Alito, Clarence Thomas, and Brett Kavanaugh joined. They claimed that the EPA's methodology in their report was misreported and incorrect. They applied the Clean Air Act's section that allows a court to reverse a federal implementation plan if it is "arbitrary or capricious" and found in favor of Ohio.

=== Dissent ===
Amy Coney Barrett delivered the dissent, joined by Sonia Sotomayor, Elena Kagan, and Ketanji Brown Jackson. The dissent argued that the petition did not meet the criteria for emergency relief and that the case should be re-evaluated on its merits.
