= McElrath v. Georgia =

- Supreme Court of the United States

Argued November 28, 2023 Decided February 21, 2024
- Full case name: Damian McElrath v. Georgia
- Docket no.: 22-721
- Citations: 601 U.S. 87 (more)
- Argument: Oral argument
- Decision: Opinion

Questions presented
- Whether the double jeopardy clause of the Fifth Amendment prohibits a second prosecution for a crime of which a defendant was previously acquitted.

Holding
- "Not guilty by reason of insanity" is an acquittal for double jeopardy purposes notwithstanding any inconsistency with the jury's other verdicts.

Court membership
- Chief Justice John Roberts Associate Justices Clarence Thomas · Samuel Alito; Sonia Sotomayor · Elena Kagan; Neil Gorsuch · Brett Kavanaugh; Amy Coney Barrett · Ketanji Brown Jackson

Case opinions
- Majority: Jackson, joined by unanimous
- Concurrence: Alito

Laws applied
- U.S. Const. amend. V

McElrath v. Georgia, 601 U.S. 87 (2024), is a United States Supreme Court case in which the Court held that "Not guilty by reason of insanity" is an acquittal for double jeopardy purposes notwithstanding any inconsistency with the jury's other verdicts.

== Background ==
On December 11, 2017, Damian McElrath was found guilty but mentally ill by a jury on the charge of felony murder and aggravated assault, but not guilty on the charge of malice murder due to insanity. Both charges are related to one episode where McElrath stabbed his adoptive mother, Diane McElrath, 50 times until her death.

Due to the fact that he was found to be not guilty due to insanity in one charge but guilty as to another over the same episode, McElrath appealed the verdict to the Supreme Court of Georgia, calling the jury verdict "repugnant". The Georgia Supreme Court agreed with McElrath's arguments and vacated the trial court's verdict and remanded the case for further proceedings on both charges.

Back at the trial court, McElrath filed a plea arguing that the court should not hear the charge for malice murder again due to the fact that he was found not guilty in the initial trial and should not be tried twice under the Double Jeopardy Clause of the Fifth Amendment to the United States Constitution. The trial court disagreed and denied his plea. Seeking review again, McElrath appealed to the Georgia Supreme Court over the trial court hearing his malice murder charge despite the initial acquittal, and argued that the Supreme Court should have reversed the verdict at the start and not remanded the charge of malice murder. The Georgia Supreme Court, however, unanimously affirmed the trial court's ruling, stating that since they had ruled that the initial verdict was "repugnant", the verdict in its entirety should be "void" and is "useless".

The petitioner then appealed to the Supreme Court of the United States to review the lower court's decision.

== Supreme Court ==
A Petition for a Writ of Certiorari was filed on behalf of McElrath on January 31, 2023. The Supreme Court of the United States agreed to hear this case in their last order list of the October 2022 term on June 30, 2023.

=== Decision ===
Justice Jackson wrote the opinion for a unanimous court, vacating the ruling of the Supreme Court of Georgia and ruling that the "not guilty by reason of insanity" verdict is an acquittal for the purpose of the double jeopardy clause:

The jury’s verdict of not guilty by reason of insanity on the malice-murder charge was an acquittal for purposes of the Double Jeopardy Clause. The Clause therefore bars retrial of McElrath on that charge.

The Court did not address the conflicting verdicts and whether any of the other vacated convictions are also barred from retrial, instead choosing to leave that question to the Georgia courts.

=== Concurring opinion ===
Justice Alito wrote a short concurring opinion merely to clarify that the opinion of the Court extends only to the "not guilty" verdict. While pointing out that some States do have a practice of not allowing a jury to return inconsistent verdicts, such as what occurred at the trial court, Alito points out that such is not mandated by this decision or any prior decision of the Supreme Court:

We have held that federal law does not prevent the acceptance of inconsistent verdicts, United States v. Powell, 469 U. S. 57, 68–69 (1984); Dunn v. United States, 284 U. S. 390, 393–394 (1932), but we have never held that the Constitution mandates that practice—which is not necessarily favorable to either the prosecution or the defense. Nothing that we say today should be understood to express any view about whether a not-guilty verdict that is inconsistent with a verdict on another count and is not accepted by the trial judge constitutes an "acquittal" for double jeopardy purposes.
