= Winter v. Natural Resources Defense Council =

- Supreme Court of the United States

Argued October 8, 2008 Decided November 12, 2008
- Full case name: Donald C. Winter, Secretary of the Navy, et al., Petitioners v. Natural Resources Defense Council, Inc., et al.
- Docket no.: 07-1239
- Citations: 555 U.S. 7 (more) 129 S. Ct. 365; 172 L. Ed. 2d 249; 2008 U.S. LEXIS 8343

Case history
- Prior: Nat. Res. Def. Council, Inc. v. Winter, 530 F. Supp. 2d 1110 (C.D. Cal. 2008); affirmed, 518 F.3d 658 (9th Cir. 2008); cert. granted, 554 U.S. 916 (2008).

Holding
- Military preparedness outweighs environmental concerns, as Navy needs to train its crews to detect modern, silent submarines, and it cannot be forced to turn off its sonar when whales are spotted nearby.

Court membership
- Chief Justice John Roberts Associate Justices John P. Stevens · Antonin Scalia; Anthony Kennedy · David Souter; Clarence Thomas · Ruth Bader Ginsburg; Stephen Breyer · Samuel Alito

Case opinions
- Majority: Roberts, joined by Scalia, Kennedy, Thomas, Alito
- Concur/dissent: Breyer, joined by Stevens (Part I)
- Dissent: Ginsburg, joined by Souter

Winter v. Natural Resources Defense Council, 555 U.S. 7 (2008), was a decision by the United States Supreme Court concerning whether federal law restricted the United States Navy's ability to use sonar during drills given the possibility of a harmful effect on marine mammals such as whales.

In balancing military preparedness against environmental concerns, the majority came down solidly on the side of national security. Chief Justice Roberts wrote in his opinion, "the most serious possible injury would be harm to an unknown number of marine mammals that they study and observe". By contrast, he continued, "forcing the Navy to deploy an inadequately trained antisubmarine force jeopardizes the safety of the fleet".

== Background and procedural history ==
The U.S. Navy had scheduled 14 training exercises through January 2009 off the coast of Southern California involving the use of "mid-frequency active sonar" to detect enemy submarines. Environmentalists argued that the sonar's high decibel levels may have a deafening effect on whales. They said studies conducted around the world have shown the piercing underwater sounds cause whales to flee in panic or to dive too deeply. Whales have been found beached in Greece, the Canary Islands, and in the Bahamas after sonar was used in the area, and necropsies showed signs of internal bleeding near the ears.

In February 2007, however, the U.S. Navy published an environmental impact assessment under the National Environmental Policy Act (NEPA) that found that the use of mid-frequency active sonar would cause minimal harm to marine mammals. The Navy, represented by Solicitor General Gregory G. Garre, "highlight[ed] that there was an 'absence' of injury to marine mammals in Southern California despite forty years of Navy training in the area".

The petitioners were mostly environmental groups, including Natural Resources Defense Council and Jean-Michel Cousteau's Ocean Futures Society, among others. They sought declaratory and injunctive relief against the exercises on the ground that they violated NEPA and other environmental laws.

The U.S. District Court for the Central District of California granted a preliminary injunction barring conduct of the exercises. On remand from the Court of Appeals for the Ninth Circuit, the district court modified the preliminary injunction to allow the Navy to use sonar if it used mitigation measures. On the Navy's second appeal, challenging two of the mitigation measures, the Ninth Circuit—"widely regarded as an environmentally friendly"—affirmed the modified injunction, noting that the plaintiffs (petitioners in the Supreme Court) had carried their burden of showing a "possibility" of irreparable injury and that the balance of hardships weighed in favor of plaintiffs.

== Opinion of the court ==
The majority opinion held that as an initial matter the Ninth Circuit's "possibility" test for issuance of a preliminary injunction is too lenient; plaintiffs must show that irreparable injury is "likely" in the absence of an injunction. However, the Court continued, even if plaintiffs had shown irreparable injury (and, too, likelihood of success on the merits), it is "plainly outweighed" by the Navy's interest in effective, realistic training of its sailors. That factor alone requires denial of the requested injunctive relief. For the plaintiffs, the most serious possible injury would be the loss of ability to observe an unknown number of marine mammals. In light of the foregoing, the Court reversed the decision below and vacated the preliminary injunction. The Court technically did not address the merits of the lawsuit—that is, whether the training exercises had violated NEPA or the other federal environmental laws.

Justice Ruth Bader Ginsburg, joined by Justice David Souter, wrote a dissenting opinion which sided with the Ninth Circuit. She found that despite the importance of the U.S. Navy's training exercises, they did not outweigh the considerations of environmental harm mandated by NEPA.

== Comments ==
A report published in 2009 by the Congressional Research Service noted that the Supreme Court accepted the case "as a challenge to a preliminary injunction, rather than to the merits of petitioners' statutory claims". However, the report observed that "the Court made clear, however, that its perception of an overriding national security interest in the challenged training exercises should lead the district court to reject a final injunction as well, in the event the military is found to have violated an environmental statute".

This was the first time the United States successfully got the judiciary to reject the Ninth Circuit's "mere possibility" test for issuing injunctions.

Other commentators called it "a dangerous precedent" and "a troubling example of unquestioned deference to an invocation of military necessity at the expense of the environment" and said that it "signal[ed] a marked shift from lower courts' treatment of NEPA injunctions, raising questions about the availability of restraining orders for NEPA violations in the future".

== See also ==
- Anti-submarine warfare
- Beached whale
- List of United States Supreme Court cases, volume 555
- List of United States Supreme Court cases
- Marine mammals and sonar
