= Macquarie Infrastructure Corp. v. Moab Partners, L.P. =

- Supreme Court of the United States

Decided Apr 12, 2024
- Full case name: Macquarie Infrastructure Corp. v. Moab Partners, L.P.
- Docket no.: 22-1165
- Citations: 601 U.S. 257 (more)

Holding
- Pure omissions are not actionable under the SEC's Rule 10b–5(b).

Court membership
- Chief Justice John Roberts Associate Justices Clarence Thomas · Samuel Alito; Sonia Sotomayor · Elena Kagan; Neil Gorsuch · Brett Kavanaugh; Amy Coney Barrett · Ketanji Brown Jackson

Case opinion
- Majority: Sotomayor, joined by unanimous

Laws applied
- 17 CFR §240.10b–5(b)

Macquarie Infrastructure Corp. v. Moab Partners, L.P., 601 U.S. 257 (2024), was a United States Supreme Court case in which the Court held that pure omissions are not actionable under the U.S. Securities and Exchange Commission's Rule 10b–5(b). Under Rule 10b–5(b), it is unlawful "[t]o make any untrue statement of a material fact or to omit to state a material fact necessary in order to make the statements made, in the light of the circumstances under which they were made, not misleading."
