= Federal Bureau of Investigation v. Fikre =

- Supreme Court of the United States

Decided March 19, 2024
- Full case name: Federal Bureau of Investigation v. Fikre
- Docket no.: 22-1178
- Citations: 601 U.S. 234 (more)

Holding
- A complaint about being put on the No Fly List is not moot simply because the government later took the plaintiff off the List. To show mootness, the government must disclose the conduct that landed the plaintiff on the No Fly List and ensure that they will not be placed back on the List for engaging in the same or similar conduct in the future.

Court membership
- Chief Justice John Roberts Associate Justices Clarence Thomas · Samuel Alito; Sonia Sotomayor · Elena Kagan; Neil Gorsuch · Brett Kavanaugh; Amy Coney Barrett · Ketanji Brown Jackson

Case opinions
- Majority: Gorsuch, joined by unanimous
- Concurrence: Alito, joined by Kavanaugh

Federal Bureau of Investigation v. Fikre, 601 U.S. 234 (2024), was a United States Supreme Court case in which the court held that a complaint about being put on the No Fly List is not moot simply because the government later took the plaintiff off the List. To show mootness, the government must disclose the conduct that landed the plaintiff on the No Fly List and ensure that they will not be placed back on the List for engaging in the same or similar conduct in the future.
