= Great Lakes Insurance SE v. Raiders Retreat Realty Co. =

Great Lakes Insurance SE v. Raiders Retreat Realty Co., LLC
- Supreme Court of the United States

Argued October 10, 2023 Decided February 21, 2024
- Full case name: Great Lakes Insurance SE v. Raiders Retreat Realty Co., LLC
- Docket no.: 22-500
- Citations: 601 U.S. 65 (more)
- Argument: Oral argument
- Decision: Opinion

Case history
- Prior: Great Lakes Insurance SE v. Raiders Retreat Realty Co., LLC, 47 F.4th 225 (3d Cir. 2022), archived from the original on March 2, 2023.

Questions presented
- Under federal admiralty law, can a choice of law clause in a maritime contract be rendered unenforceable if enforcement is contrary to the "strong public policy" of the state whose law is displaced?

Holding
- Choice-of-law provisions in maritime contracts are presumptively enforceable under federal maritime law, with narrow exceptions not applicable in this case.

Court membership
- Chief Justice John Roberts Associate Justices Clarence Thomas · Samuel Alito; Sonia Sotomayor · Elena Kagan; Neil Gorsuch · Brett Kavanaugh; Amy Coney Barrett · Ketanji Brown Jackson

Case opinions
- Majority: Kavanaugh, joined by unanimous
- Concurrence: Thomas

Great Lakes Insurance SE v. Raiders Retreat Realty Co., LLC, 601 U.S. 65 (2024), is a United States Supreme Court case regarding federal admiralty law.

== Background ==
Great Lakes Insurance is a marine insurance company organized in Germany and headquartered in the United Kingdom. Raiders Retreat Realty Co. is an LLC based in Pennsylvania. From 2007 until 2019, Great Lakes insured a yacht owned by Raiders for up to $550,000. As a part of the agreement, the parties included a choice-of-law clause in their contract. A choice-of-law clause is a term included in some contracts in which the parties stipulate that any legal dispute arising from the contract shall be determined according to the laws of a specified jurisdiction. The clause included in the contract between Great Lakes and Raiders selected federal admiralty law, or in the absence of federal admiralty law, then New York law. The clause states:

It is hereby agreed that any dispute arising hereunder shall be adjudicated according to well established, entrenched principles and precedents of substantive United States Federal Admiralty law and practice but where no such well established, entrenched precedent exists, this insuring agreement is subject to the substantive laws of the State of New York.

The contract also includes a forum-selection clause, stating that any legal dispute shall be settled in a Federal District Court:

[A]ny dispute arising hereunder shall be subject to the exclusive jurisdiction of the Federal courts of the United States of America, in particular, the Federal District court within which [Raiders] resides or the Federal District court within which [Raiders’s] insurance agent resides.

These districts are, namely, the Eastern District of Pennsylvania and the Southern District of Florida, respectively. Before the contract was renewed in 2016, a third party surveyed the yacht, and made a strong recommendation that Raiders purchase fire extinguishers and store them aboard the yacht. Raiders subsequently represented to Great Lakes that it had complied with the recommendations of the survey. Great Lakes then renewed the insurance policy.

In 2019, the yacht ran aground near Fort Lauderdale. No fire occurred, and no fire extinguishers were deployed. There was, however, significant damage to the vessel, and Raiders filed a claim under their insurance policy. Great Lakes then conducted an investigation of the yacht. The investigation revealed that the fire extinguishers on the yacht had not been inspected or recertified, in violation of the insurance policy. Additionally, the investigation revealed that Raiders had not completed the survey's recommendations, despite their misrepresentation that they had done so. On these two grounds, Great Lakes denied Raiders' insurance claim.

== Lower court history ==
Great Lakes sought a judgment in the Eastern District of Pennsylvania that it was entitled to deny coverage to Raiders. Raiders countersued, asserting five claims; three of these claims were pursuant to the laws of Pennsylvania. Great Lakes moved for a judgment with respect to the Pennsylvania claims, arguing that they were inapplicable due to the choice-of-law clause. While conceding that their Pennsylvania counterclaims would not be cognizable under New York law, Raiders argued that the clause should be deemed unenforceable under Pennsylvania's "strong public policy" of punishing insurance providers who deny coverage in bad faith. The District Court granted Great Lakes' motion for judgment on the pleadings, stating that a state's public policy cannot override the "presumptive validity" of maritime choice-of-law principles.

The United States Court of Appeals for the Third Circuit vacated and remanded the judgment of the lower court. While it agreed that the choice-of-law clause would require the application of New York law, it held that the District Court should have "consider[ed] whether Pennsylvania has a strong public policy that would be thwarted by applying New York law."

== Supreme Court ==
On November 23, 2022, Great Lakes petitioned the Supreme Court to hear its case. On March 6, 2023, the Court granted certiorari. Oral arguments took place on October 10, 2023.

In a decision issued on February 21, 2024, the Supreme Court unanimously held that choice-of-law provisions in maritime contracts are presumptively enforceable under federal maritime law, and that while narrow exceptions do exist, they were not applicable in this case. The judgment of the court of appeals is reversed.

== See also ==
- The Bremen v. Zapata Off-Shore Co. (1972), a case about the enforceability of forum selection clauses in admiralty cases.
