= Acheson Hotels, LLC v. Laufer =

- Supreme Court of the United States

Argued October 4, 2023 Decided December 5, 2023
- Full case name: Acheson Hotels, LLC v. Deborah Laufer
- Docket no.: 22-429
- Citations: 601 U.S. 1 (more) 144 S. Ct. 18; 217 L. Ed. 2d 155
- Argument: Oral argument
- Decision: Opinion

Case history
- Prior: Laufer v. Acheson Hotels, LLC, 50 F.4th 259 (1st Cir. 2022). Laufer v. Acheson Hotels, LLC (D. Me. 2021).
- Subsequent: Dismissed as moot (1st Cir. 2024).

Questions presented
- Does a self-appointed Americans with Disabilities Act "tester" have Article III standing to challenge a place of public accommodation's failure to provide disability accessibility information on its website, even if she lacks any intention of visiting that place of public accommodation?

Holding
- The case is vacated as moot.

Court membership
- Chief Justice John Roberts Associate Justices Clarence Thomas · Samuel Alito; Sonia Sotomayor · Elena Kagan; Neil Gorsuch · Brett Kavanaugh; Amy Coney Barrett · Ketanji Brown Jackson

Case opinions
- Majority: Barrett, joined by Roberts, Alito, Sotomayor, Kagan, Gorsuch, Kavanaugh
- Concurrence: Thomas (in judgment)
- Concurrence: Jackson (in judgment)

Laws applied
- Americans with Disabilities Act of 1990

Acheson Hotels, LLC v. Laufer, 601 U.S. 1 (2023), is a United States Supreme Court case regarding standing to sue under the Americans With Disabilities Act.

== Background ==
=== Legal History ===
In 1990, the United States Congress passed the Americans With Disabilities Act (ADA), a piece of civil rights legislation intended to prohibit discrimination on the basis of disability. It prohibits discrimination "on the basis of disability in the full and equal enjoyment of the goods, services, facilities, privileges, advantages, or accommodations of any place of public accommodation". The Act goes on to include hotels as one such "public accommodation". The Code of Federal Regulations further states that hotels must identify all accessibility features present in the hotel as to reasonably permit individuals with disabilities to decide for themselves whether a given hotel meets their particular needs.

=== Facts of the case ===
Deborah Laufer is a Florida resident who uses a wheelchair, and is classified as disabled by the ADA. Laufer describes herself as an ADA "tester"; she browses the internet for hotels which she believes do not provide a sufficient description of ADA compliance. When Laufer finds such a hotel, she sues, seeking an injunction and attorney's fees. Since 2018, she has sued over six hundred hotels.

== Lower court history ==
=== District court ===
In 2020, Laufer filed a lawsuit in the United States District Court for the District of Maine against Acheson Hotels, LLC, which operates hotels in southeastern Maine. Laufer stated that she visited reservation websites for two hotels operated by Acheson to find that they failed to provide sufficient information regarding ADA-accessibility at the hotels. Acheson moved to dismiss the case for lack of standing, since Laufer had no intention of staying at their hotels. Owing to a lack of injury, the district court dismissed the suit.

=== Court of appeals ===
On appeal, the United States Court of Appeals for the First Circuit reversed. It held that it was bound by Havens Realty Corp. v. Coleman, where a tester sued a landlord for providing false information about the availability of housing because of the tester's race, even though the tester did not intend to rent an apartment. In Havens Realty, the Supreme Court held that the tester had standing to sue under the Fair Housing Act's prohibition on "discriminatory representations" regarding housing availability. The Circuit Court rejected Acheson's attempts to distinguish its case from Havens Realty, and argued that while stigmatic injury alone does not give rise to Article III standing, "Laufer's feelings of frustration, humiliation, and second-class citizenry are indeed 'downstream consequences' and 'adverse effects' of the informational injury she experienced".

== Supreme Court ==
On November 4, 2022, Acheson petitioned the Supreme Court to hear its case. On March 27, 2023, the court granted certiorari.

In its merits brief, Acheson Hotels argued that Laufer's claim was moot because it had since updated its reservation website to include accessibility information, and that Laufer thus had access to that information. On July 24, Laufer requested the Court dismiss her case as moot. On August 10, the Court declined to dismiss the case; rather, it suggested the question of mootness would be subject to further consideration at oral argument, in addition to the other question presented. Oral arguments were heard on October 4, 2023. The case was argued, on behalf of Acheson Hotels, by Adam Unikowsky and, for Laufer, by Kelsi Corkran. The case was also argued on behalf of the United States, as amicus curiae, by Erica Ross, assistant to the Solicitor General.

On December 5, 2023, the Court released its opinion, dismissing the case as moot. Justice Amy Coney Barrett wrote for the majority, applying Munsingwear vacatur: "[Laufer] voluntarily dismissed her pending ADA cases after a lower court sanctioned her lawyer. She represented to this Court that she will not file any others. Laufer's case against Acheson is moot, and we dismiss it on that ground. We emphasize, however, that we might exercise our discretion differently in a future case." Justice Clarence Thomas concurred in the judgment, saying that he would have answered the merits of the case by concluding that Laufer lacked standing. Justice Ketanji Brown Jackson also concurred in the judgment, agreeing with the majority that the case should be declared moot but objecting to the use of Munsingwear vacatur.

== See also ==
- Sinochem International Co. v. Malaysia International Shipping Corp.
- Munsingwear vacatur
