= Truck Insurance Exchange v. Kaiser Gypsum Co. =

- Supreme Court of the United States

Decided Jun 6, 2024
- Full case name: Truck Insurance Exchange v. Kaiser Gypsum Co.
- Docket no.: 22-1079
- Citations: 602 U.S. 268 (more)

Holding
- An insurer with financial responsibility for bankruptcy claims is a "party in interest" under §1109(b) that "may raise and may appear and be heard on any issue" in a Chapter 11 case.

Court membership
- Chief Justice John Roberts Associate Justices Clarence Thomas · Samuel Alito; Sonia Sotomayor · Elena Kagan; Neil Gorsuch · Brett Kavanaugh; Amy Coney Barrett · Ketanji Brown Jackson

Case opinion
- Majority: Sotomayor, joined by unanimous
- Alito took no part in the consideration or decision of the case.

Truck Insurance Exchange v. Kaiser Gypsum Co., 602 U.S. 268 (2024), was a United States Supreme Court case in which the Court held that an insurer with financial responsibility for bankruptcy claims is a "party in interest" under §1109(b) that "may raise and may appear and be heard on any issue" in a Chapter 11 case.
