= Murray v. UBS Securities, LLC =

- Supreme Court of the United States

Argued October 10, 2023 Decided February 8, 2024
- Full case name: Trevor Murray v. UBS Securities LLC, and UBS AG
- Docket no.: 22-660
- Citations: 601 U.S. 23 (more)
- Argument: Oral argument
- Decision: Opinion

Case history
- Prior: Murray v. UBS Sec., 43 F.4th 254 (2d Cir. 2022). Murray v. UBS Sec., LLC, 14 Civ. 927 (KPF) (S.D.N.Y. 2020)

Questions presented
- Under the burden-shifting framework that governs Sarbanes-Oxley cases, must a whistleblower prove his employer acted with a "retaliatory intent" as part of his case in chief, or is the lack of "retaliatory intent" part of the affirmative defense on which the employer bears the burden of proof?

Holding
- A whistleblower seeking to invoke the protections of section 806 of the SOX Act must prove that their protected activity was a contributing factor in the employer’s unfavorable personnel action, but need not prove that the employer acted with “retaliatory intent.”

Court membership
- Chief Justice John Roberts Associate Justices Clarence Thomas · Samuel Alito; Sonia Sotomayor · Elena Kagan; Neil Gorsuch · Brett Kavanaugh; Amy Coney Barrett · Ketanji Brown Jackson

Case opinions
- Majority: Sotomayor, joined by unanimous
- Concurrence: Alito, joined by Barrett

Murray v. UBS Securities, LLC, 601 U.S. 23 (2024), is a United States Supreme Court case regarding the standard for bringing a whistleblower retaliation claim under the Sarbanes-Oxley Act.

== Prior history ==
In 2002, the United States Congress enacted the Sarbanes–Oxley Act (SOX). Passed in the aftermath of various major corporate accounting scandals (including Enron and WorldCom) SOX mandated certain financial record keeping and reporting practices for corporations. The Act imposes responsibilities upon a public corporation's board of directors, and adds criminal penalties for misconduct.

In order to encourage disclosure, SOX protects whistleblowers who report financial wrongdoing by providing a civil cause of action to protect against retaliation by employers. The portion of SOX that amended Title 18 states that when a whistleblower invokes the Act, claiming that he was fired for his reporting, his claim is "governed by the legal burdens of proof set forth in section 42121(b) of title 49, United States Code." Under that framework, the employee meets his burden of proof by demonstrating that his reporting "was a contributing factor in the unfavorable personnel action alleged in the complaint." If the employee meets this burden, then the employer can only prevail if it "demonstrates by clear and convincing evidence that the employer would have taken the same unfavorable personnel action in the absence of that behavior."

== Background ==
From 2007 to 2008, Trevor Murray worked for UBS, a multinational investment bank and financial services company. In 2011, he was recruited back to UBS. When he returned, Murray was responsible for researching UBS's commercial mortgage-backed securities (CMBS), and reporting his findings to the firm's current and prospective customers. Securities and Exchange Commission (SEC) regulations required Murray to certify, under penalty of law, that his findings accurately reflected his personal and independent views.

Despite this, Murray's supervisors pressured him into skewing his findings in favor of UBS business strategies. Although UBS's compliance department had physically separated Murray's workspace from the trading floor (which actively sold CMBS) to ensure compliance, his supervisors continued to attempt to influence Murray's work. Notwithstanding Murray's internal memoranda describing the firm's CMBS trading as "risky", his supervisors continued to describe it as profitable and successful.

In early December 2011, Murray's supervisor, Michael Schumacher, prepared a glowing review of Murray's performance. He had not yet been made aware of the pressure Murray was receiving from the trading desk. Later that month, the two met and Murray revealed the situation to Schumacher, saying that it "wasn't just unethical, it was illegal" Schumacher relayed this to one of his supervisors, Larry Hatheway. Schumacher proposed to Hatheway that Murray should either be fired or moved to the trading desk. Two days later, Murray and Schumacher met again, and Schumacher gave Murray his performance review — Schumacher did not mention to Murray that his job was in jeopardy. Murray reiterated his perception of unlawful behavior on behalf of the trading desk, but Schumacher advised Murray to just print favorable findings. After another supervisor declined to move Murray to the trading desk, Schumacher and Hatheway agreed to fire Murray. On February 6, 2012, Schumacher fired Murray.

== Lower court history ==
In August 2012, Murray filed a claim with the Department of Labor alleging that his employment was terminated in retaliation because of his whistleblowing, in violation of the Sarbanes-Oxley Act. After 180 days, his complaint lapsed, and Murray exercised his right to file a de novo action in the United States District Court for the Southern District of New York.

=== District Court ===
Murray's case went to trial in 2017. At trial, Murray contested that: he was unlawfully pressured by the UBS trading desk to skew his work product in favor of UBS's CMBS business, in violation of SEC regulations; he reported this behavior to his supervisor, who then advised him to capitulate, and; that he was fired for his unfavorable reporting. On the other hand, UBS contended that Murray's entire claim was fabricated — that there was no pressure directed at Murray, and thus none of his behavior could have been protected by SOX. Jurors were instructed that, for Murray to prevail on his retaliation claim, he must prove four factors: (1) that he engaged in protected conduct, (2) that his employer was aware of this conduct, (3) that he was fired, and (4) that his conduct was a contributing factor in his termination.

The jury was instructed that, if it found the existence of these four factors, it should shift to the second step of SOX's burden shifting framework. Namely, in order to prevail, UBS would need to demonstrate that it would have terminated Murray's employment regardless of his engagement in protected activity. If they found that UBS had improperly retaliated against Murray, then he would be entitled to compensation. The jury found that Murray had proven all four elements of his claim, but that UBS had not met its burden of proof. Murray was awarded nearly $1 million in damages.

=== Court of Appeals ===
On appeal to the United States Court of Appeals for the Second Circuit, UBS made two arguments. First, it argued that Murray had failed to prove that UBS had acted with "retaliatory intent" when it terminated Murray's employment. Second, it argued that the burden of proving retaliatory intent should fall on Murray, rather than requiring UBS to show a lack of such retaliatory intent. The Court disagreed with UBS on its first argument, finding that sufficient evidence had been presented at trial to prove that UBS had acted with retaliatory intent. However, it agreed with UBS on its second argument, that the jury should have been instructed that it was Murray's burden to prove retaliatory intent. Murray unsuccessfully petitioned for an en banc rehearing of his case.

== Supreme Court ==
On January 13, 2023, Murray petitioned the Supreme Court to hear his case. On May 1, 2023, the Court granted certiorari. Oral argument was held on October 10, 2023.

On February 8, 2024, Justice Sotomayor delivered a unanimous opinion, siding with Murray. The justices held that with the protections of SOX, a whistleblower does not have to prove that their employer acted with "retaliatory intent", but that they do need to prove that their activity, protected by SOX, contributed to what the employer did in response.
