= Corner Post, Inc. v. Board of Governors of the Federal Reserve System =

- Supreme Court of the United States

Argued February 20, 2024 Decided July 1, 2024
- Full case name: Corner Post, Inc. v. Board of Governors of the Federal Reserve System
- Docket no.: 22-1008
- Citations: 603 U.S. 799 (more)
- Argument: Oral argument
- Decision: Opinion

Case history
- Prior: Case dismissed, Corner Post, Inc. v. Board of Governors of the Federal Reserve System, No. 1:21-cv-00095, 2022 WL 909317 (D.N.D. March 11, 2022), affirmed sub nom. North Dakota Retail Ass'n v. Board of Governors of the Federal Reserve System, 55 F.4th 634 (8th Cir. 2022).

Questions presented
- Whether a plaintiff's Administrative Procedure Act claim "first accrues" under 28 U.S.C. § 2401(a) when an agency issues a rule — regardless of whether that rule injures the plaintiff on that date — or when the rule first causes a plaintiff to "suffer[] legal wrong" or be "adversely affected or aggrieved."

Holding
- An APA claim does not accrue for purposes of §2401(a)'s 6-year statute of limitations until the plaintiff is injured by final agency action.

Court membership
- Chief Justice John Roberts Associate Justices Clarence Thomas · Samuel Alito; Sonia Sotomayor · Elena Kagan; Neil Gorsuch · Brett Kavanaugh; Amy Coney Barrett · Ketanji Brown Jackson

Case opinions
- Majority: Barrett, joined by Roberts, Thomas, Alito, Gorsuch, Kavanaugh
- Concurrence: Kavanaugh
- Dissent: Jackson, joined by Sotomayor, Kagan

Laws applied
- 28 U.S.C. § 2401(a); Administrative Procedure Act

Corner Post, Inc. v. Board of Governors of the Federal Reserve System, 603 U.S. 799 (2024), is a United States Supreme Court case about the statute of limitations for judicial review of federal agency rulemaking under the Administrative Procedure Act. The legal question under review was whether a challenge to the validity of a rule must be brought within six years of the rule's issuance—or instead within six years of when the rule first injures the particular plaintiff challenging the rule. The Supreme Court held, by a 6–3 vote, that the statute of limitations does not start running until the particular plaintiff has been harmed by the agency action.

The lawsuit was a challenge to a 2011 regulation of the Federal Reserve Board setting the maximum fees that large banks can charge merchants for a debit-card transaction, but the question before the Supreme Court was limited to whether the case was properly dismissed because of the statute of limitations. Beyond the particular case, this has wider significance for whether federal regulations more than six years old can still be challenged for procedural defects in their enactment.

== Background ==
In 2010, Congress enacted the Dodd–Frank Wall Street Reform and Consumer Protection Act. One part of the Act, the Durbin amendment, required the Federal Reserve Board to promulgate a regulation limiting fees for debit-card transactions. In 2011, the Board published its final rule, which set the maximum transaction fee at $0.21 plus 0.05% (5 basis points).

Several merchant groups challenged the rule in 2011 in NACS v. Board of Governors of the Federal Reserve System, saying that the fee cap had been set too high. The district judge ruled that the Board had not reasonably complied with the Durbin amendment, but the D.C. Circuit reversed on appeal, upholding the regulation as within the agency's discretion. In 2015, the Supreme Court declined to review the case.

In April 2021, two North Dakota trade associations—the North Dakota Retail Association and the North Dakota Petroleum Marketers Association—filed this case under the name North Dakota Retail Association v. Board of Governors of the Federal Reserve System. The Federal Reserve Board filed a motion to dismiss the case for lack of jurisdiction, saying that the six-year statute of limitations had elapsed. In response, the trade associations added a third plaintiff, Corner Post, Inc., a truck stop which had first opened in 2018. Nevertheless, the district court dismissed the suit with respect to all three plaintiffs, saying that their claims accrued at the time that the rule was enacted in 2011. The Court of Appeals for the Eighth Circuit affirmed the decision of the district court.

Most courts of appeals tasked with deciding this issue—before the Supreme Court granted review—concluded that the limitation period for pre-enforcement review runs from the date that the rule became effective. Only the Sixth Circuit expressly rejected this prevailing interpretation. However, the prevailing view had been criticized as disregarding the text of the statute, which says that "every civil action commenced against the United States shall be barred unless the complaint is filed within six years after the right of action first accrues."

The Supreme Court granted review by writ of certiorari on September 29, 2023.

== Supreme Court ==
Justice Amy Coney Barrett delivered the opinion of the Supreme Court, joined by Justices Roberts, Thomas, Alito, Gorsuch, and Kavanaugh. The Court held that a "claim accrues when the plaintiff has the right to assert it in court—and in the case of the [Administrative Procedure Act], that is when the plaintiff is injured by final agency action."

Justice Kavanaugh wrote a concurring opinion on an "additional point" not resolved by the majority opinion. He disagreed with the government's position that the APA does not authorize universal vacatur of a rule, in which a court voids a regulation even as applied to those not involved in the case. He said that the statutory provision directing courts to "set aside [unlawful] agency action" allows courts to vacate regulations—distinguishing vacatur from universal injunctions, which he said would go beyond courts' remedial power. In his view, universal vacatur was necessary for unregulated parties to be able to challenge "adverse downstream effects" of agency actions.

Justice Ketanji Brown Jackson wrote a dissenting opinion, joined by Justices Sotomayor and Kagan. She said that the majority accepted a simplified definition of accrual, which the Supreme Court had previously said is context specific, even though statutes of limitations in administrative law cases normally ran from final agency action. She also noted that Corner Post and Loper Bright Enterprises v. Raimondo—the decision that overturned Chevron deference days earlier—would cause a "tsunami of lawsuits" to old agency regulations whose legal interpretations were previously entitled to deference.

== Reactions ==
Retired judge David Tatel pointed out that this decision means that new businesses can be created for the purpose of challenging government regulations that would otherwise be protected by the statute of limitations.

In July 2024, Representatives Jerry Nadler and Lou Correa introduced the Corner Post Reversal Act, which would adopt the dissenting view in Corner Post.
