= Pulsifer v. United States =

- Supreme Court of the United States

Argued October 2, 2023 Decided March 15, 2024
- Full case name: Mark E. Pulsifer v. United States
- Docket no.: 22-340
- Argument: Oral argument

Case history
- Prior: United States v. Pulsifer, 39 F.4th 1018 (8th Cir. 2022).

Questions presented
- Whether a defendant satisfies the criteria in 18 U.S.C. § 3553(f)(1) as amended by the First Step Act of 2018 in order to qualify for the federal drug-sentencing “safety valve” provision so long as he does not have (a) more than four criminal history points, (b) a three-point offense, and (c) a two-point offense, or whether the defendant satisfies the criteria so long as he does not have (a), (b), or (c).

Holding
- A criminal defendant facing a mandatory minimum sentence is eligible for safety-valve relief under 18 U.S.C. § 3553(f)(1) only if the defendant satisfies each of the provision’s three conditions.

Court membership
- Chief Justice John Roberts Associate Justices Clarence Thomas · Samuel Alito; Sonia Sotomayor · Elena Kagan; Neil Gorsuch · Brett Kavanaugh; Amy Coney Barrett · Ketanji Brown Jackson

Case opinions
- Majority: Kagan, joined by Roberts, Thomas, Alito, Kavanaugh, Barrett
- Dissent: Gorsuch, joined by Sotomayor, Jackson

Laws applied
- 18 U.S.C. § 3553(f)(1)

Pulsifer v. United States, 601 U.S. 124 (2024), is a decision of the United States Supreme Court interpreting 18 U.S.C. § 3553(f)(1), a provision of the federal sentencing statute as amended by the First Step Act.

== Background ==
=== Legal background ===
The federal sentencing statute, 18 U.S.C. 3553, contains a provision known as a "safety valve". The safety valve, located at § 3553(f), requires the trial courts to sentence qualifying defendants according to the Federal Sentencing Guidelines, regardless of any statutory minimum sentences. Criteria for qualification are listed in § 3553(f)(1) through (5). Subsections (f)(2) through (f)(4) focus on the crime for which the defendant will be sentenced, subsection (f)(5) focuses on the defendant's cooperation with the government, and subsection (f)(1) focuses on the defendant's prior criminal record. This subsection states that courts must impose sentences pursuant to the Federal Sentencing Guidelines if it finds that:

(1) the defendant does not have—

(A) more than 4 criminal history points, excluding any criminal history points resulting from a 1–point offense, as determined under the sentencing guidelines;
(B) a prior 3–point offense, as determined under the sentencing guidelines; and [emphasis added]
(C) a prior 2–point violent offense, as determined under the sentencing guidelines;

=== Factual background ===
Mark Pulsifer pleaded guilty in the United States District Court for the Southern District of Iowa to one count of distributing at least fifty grams of methamphetamine, contrary to 21 U.S.C. § 841(a)(1). Since Pulsifer had previously been convicted of a serious drug felony, he faced a mandatory minimum sentence of fifteen years, unless he qualified for safety valve relief. Neither Pulsifer nor the United States disputed that Pulsifer met the requirements of § 3553(f)(2) through (f)(5). Turning to (f)(1), it is also undisputed that Pulsifer's prior criminal record triggers subsections (A) and (B), but that subsection (C) is not triggered. At sentencing, Pulsifer argued that he is eligible for safety valve relief because his prior conduct does not trigger (A), (B), and (C). The District Court disagreed, saying that a defendant whose prior record triggers (A), (B), or (C) is not eligible for safety valve relief. The Eighth Circuit affirmed the judgment of the District Court.

Courts of appeals are split on how to read the "and" in § 3553(f)(1). In the Fourth, Ninth, and Eleventh Circuits, a defendant is eligible for safety valve relief unless his prior criminal record satisfies subsections (A), (B), and (C). In the Fifth, Sixth, Seventh, and Eighth Circuits, a defendant is eligible for safety value relief unless his prior criminal record satisfies subsections (A), (B), or (C).

== Supreme Court ==
On October 7, 2022, Pulsifer petitioned the Supreme Court to hear his case. On February 27, 2023, the Court granted certiorari. Oral arguments were heard on October 2, 2023. The case was argued by Shay Dvoretzky, on behalf of Pulsifer, and Frederick Liu, from the Solicitor General’s office on behalf of the United States.
