= Muldrow v. City of St. Louis =

- Supreme Court of the United States

Argued December 6, 2023 Decided April 17, 2024
- Full case name: Jatonya Clayborn Muldrow v. City of St. Louis, Missouri, et al.
- Docket no.: 22-193
- Argument: Oral argument
- Reargument: Reargument
- Opinion announcement: Opinion announcement

Case history
- Prior: Summary judgment granted, No. 4:18-CV-02150-AGF, 2020 WL 5505113 (E.D. Mo. September 11, 2020); Affirmed, 30 F.4th 680 (8th Cir. 2022); Cert. granted, 143 S. Ct. 2686 (2023)

Questions presented
- Does Title VII prohibit discrimination in transfer decisions absent a separate court determination that the transfer decision caused a significant disadvantage?

Holding
- Title VII of the Civil Rights Act of 1964 protects against discriminatory job transfers even where the transfer does not result in a significant disadvantage.

Court membership
- Chief Justice John Roberts Associate Justices Clarence Thomas · Samuel Alito; Sonia Sotomayor · Elena Kagan; Neil Gorsuch · Brett Kavanaugh; Amy Coney Barrett · Ketanji Brown Jackson

Case opinions
- Majority: Kagan, joined by Roberts, Sotomayor, Gorsuch, Barrett, Jackson
- Concurrence: Thomas (in judgment)
- Concurrence: Alito (in judgment)
- Concurrence: Kavanaugh (in judgment)

Muldrow v. City of St. Louis, 601 U.S. 346 (2024), was a United States Supreme Court decision which held that Title VII of the Civil Rights Act of 1964 protects against discriminatory job transfers even where the transfer does not result in a significant disadvantage.

Prior to the Supreme Court's decision, the US Court of Appeals for the Eighth Circuit had affirmed the US District Court for the Eastern District of Missouri's decision that a transfer must result in a "materially significant disadvantage" to be actionable under Title VII. Under the new standard, Title VII plaintiffs must prove that they experienced "some harm."

== Background ==
=== Legislation and prior case law ===
The Civil Rights Act of 1964 was passed into law amid the civil rights movement. It had been proposed by President John F. Kennedy as a means to combat racial discrimination and racial segregation in the aftermath of the Birmingham campaign. After Kennedy's assassination in November 1963, his successor Lyndon B. Johnson secured its passage in the following year.

Among several provisions in the law is Title VII, which covers equal employment opportunities. Its key provision, codified at 42 U.S.C. § 2000e-2(a)(1), states that it is illegal to discriminate "with respect to his compensation, terms, conditions, or privileges of employment because of such individual's race, color, religion, sex, or national origin."

In employment discrimination cases where the only evidence of discrimination is indirect, courts evaluate the claim under the McDonnell Douglas burden-shifting framework. To have an actionable claim under Title VII, and other employment discrimination statutes, the plaintiff must make out a prima facie (on its face) case of discrimination. This requires a plaintiff to show "(1) she is a member of a protected group; (2) she was subjected to an adverse employment decision; (3) she was qualified for the position; and (4) she was replaced by a person outside the protected class, or similarly situated non-protected employees were treated more favorably." If the plaintiff can meet these factors, they have shown an inference of discrimination, which the employer can rebut.

By the mid 1990s, plaintiffs were expected to prove that the discriminatory employment action was "materially adverse" to qualify for Title VII protections, a standard which was interpreted to exclude lateral transfers, in which one retains similar pay and benefits while shifted into a different position.

Under the Court of Appeals for the Fifth Circuit's "ultimate employment decision" standard, plaintiffs could only bring Title VII claims in cases of discriminatory hiring, firing, compensation, and/or placement on leave. In 2017, the District Court for Western Louisiana applied this standard to deny Title VII protections to an employee alleging racial and religious discrimination in punishments for lateness and access to air conditioning.

Responding to academic and judicial criticism of the material adversity standard, Judge Brett Kavanaugh of the Court of Appeals for the D.C. Circuit wrote a concurring opinion in Ortiz-Diaz v. US Department of Housing and Urban Development, arguing that "all discriminatory transfers (and discriminatory denials of requested transfers) are actionable under Title VII." In a 2021 opinion by Chief Judge Jeffrey Sutton, the Sixth Circuit became the first circuit to hold that lateral transfers can meet the adverse employment standard. The D.C. Circuit followed suit in 2022, and the Fifth Circuit overruled its "ultimate employment decision" standard in 2023.

=== Case background ===
Jatonya Clayborn Muldrow is a sergeant with the St. Louis Police Department. From 2008 to 2017, she worked in the Department's Intelligence Division. In 2017, the Intelligence Division's new commander transferred Muldrow into the department's Fifth District, which had the same pay and title but changed her schedule, overtime opportunities, prestige, and comfort of work clothing (she previously could wear plainclothes but now had to wear a uniform, duty belt, and vest). Muldrow's replacement at the Intelligence Division was a man. Muldrow was then denied a transfer to become the administrative aide to the Captain in the Department's Second District. Muldrow was eventually transferred back to the Intelligence Division.

== Lower court history ==
Muldrow sued the Department and the Police Captain in Missouri state court for violations of Title VII, as well as state law. The Department removed the case to the United States District Court for the Eastern District of Missouri. The trial court granted summary judgment to the Department because it found Muldrow did not suffer a materially adverse action and thus failed to satisfy the "adverse employment action" prong in the McDonnell Douglas burden-shifting framework. The United States Court of Appeals for the Eighth Circuit affirmed.

== Supreme Court ==
On August 29, 2022, Muldrow petitioned the Supreme Court to hear her case. On June 30, 2023, the court granted certiorari. The case was argued on December 6, 2023. On behalf of Ms. Muldrow, the case was argued by Brian Wolfman, Director of the Georgetown Law Appellate Courts Immersion Clinic, who split the argument time with Deputy Solicitor General Aimee Brown. Robert Loeb, a partner at Orrick, Herrington & Sutcliffe, argued the case for St. Louis Police Department.

During oral argument, a majority of the justices seemed to lean towards Ms. Muldrow's argument. On April 24, 2024, the Supreme Court vacated the Eighth Circuit's decision. The Supreme Court held that Title VII plaintiffs must show only "some harm" to have an actionable claim.
