= State action =

US constitutional law doctrine

In United States constitutional law, state action is an action by a person who is acting on behalf of a governmental body, and is therefore subject to limitations imposed on government by the United States Constitution, including the First, Fifth, and Fourteenth Amendments, which prohibit the federal and state governments from violating certain rights and freedoms.

== Jurisprudence ==
=== Meaning ===
Though the term would seem to include only persons who are directly employed by the state, the United States Supreme Court has interpreted these amendments and laws passed pursuant to them to cover many persons who have only an indirect relationship with the government. Controversies have arisen, for example, over whether private companies that run towns (the "company-town") and prisons (traditionally a state function) can be held liable as having performed a state action when they violate fundamental civil rights. This question remains unresolved, but the Supreme Court has held private citizens to be liable for state action when they conspire with government officials to deprive people of their rights.

The 1989 case of DeShaney v. Winnebago County was decided on the basis of the state action doctrine. Social workers separated a young son Joshua from his abusive father Randy, but concluded there was not enough evidence for a permanent separation, and later reunited son with father; later, the father beat his son into a persistent vegetative state. The Supreme Court ruled that despite involvement by state social workers, the wrongful action was attributable only to the father, making it a private action. Accordingly, the Fourteenth Amendment protections did not apply.

Unlike state action, private action is generally not required to afford individuals the constitutional rights mentioned above. In nearly all U.S. states, private shopping center owners can eject protesters from their land for trespassing, and private associations can eject members or deny admission to applicants, with no warning and for no reason. But in a handful of states, notably California, state constitutional protections and certain common law rights have been extended to limit private action. California allows the peaceful exercise of free speech in private shopping centers (see Pruneyard Shopping Center v. Robins (1980)) and requires certain types of private action to afford current or potential members a rudimentary version of procedural due process called fair procedure.

=== Cases ===
There are a number of situations where the United States Supreme Court has recognized the conduct of individuals or private organizations to be "state action," and therefore subject to provisions of the Constitution such as Equal Protection, Due Process, or the First Amendment. Equal Protection is guaranteed under Section I of the 14th Amendment and Due Process is guaranteed under the 5th Amendment. The Supreme Court has held the following:

- Merely opening up a business to the public is not state action, but the performance of a "public function" (a function that has been traditionally and exclusively performed by the state) is state action (Marsh v. Alabama, 326 U.S. 501 (1946));
- If an individual or organization merely enters into a contract or asserts a contractual right outside of court it is not state action, but if an individual or organization sues to judicially enforce a contractual right it can be state action (Shelley v. Kraemer, 334 U.S. 1 (1948));
- If the government merely acquiesces in the performance of an act by a private individual or organization it is not state action, but if the government coerces, influences, or encourages the performance of the act, it is state action (Rendell-Baker v. Kohn, 457 U.S. 830 (1982));
- If the government merely enters into a contract with an individual or organization for the goods or services, the actions of the private party are not state action, but if the government and the private party enter into a "joint enterprise" or a "symbiotic relationship" with each other it is state action (Burton v. Wilmington Parking Authority, 365 U.S. 715 (1961));
- If government agencies are simply members of a private organization, the actions of the organization are not state action, but if the government is "pervasively entwined" with the leadership of the private organization, the acts of the organization are state action (Brentwood Academy v. Tennessee Secondary School Athletic Association, 535 U.S. 971 (2002)).

== Scholarly commentary ==
According to constitutional law scholar Gillian E. Metzger:

The underlying presumption is that cases where private action wields public power are rare and occur mainly when the government tries to hide behind private surrogates whom it controls. Current doctrine pays little attention to whether the government is, in fact, delegating power to private entities to act on its behalf. To the extent private delegations are considered, it is under the rubric of private delegation doctrine, which assesses whether the Constitution's separation of powers and due process requirements prohibit the government from delegating certain types of powers to private hands. But constitutional law makes no attempt to link the constitutionality of a private delegation to the risk that it will place government power outside of constitutional controls.

== See also ==
- Citizenship
- Treason
- Manhattan Community Access Corp. v. Halleck
- Jones v. Alfred H. Mayer Co., private party was held liable for discrimination
