= Gibson Dunn =

American law firm

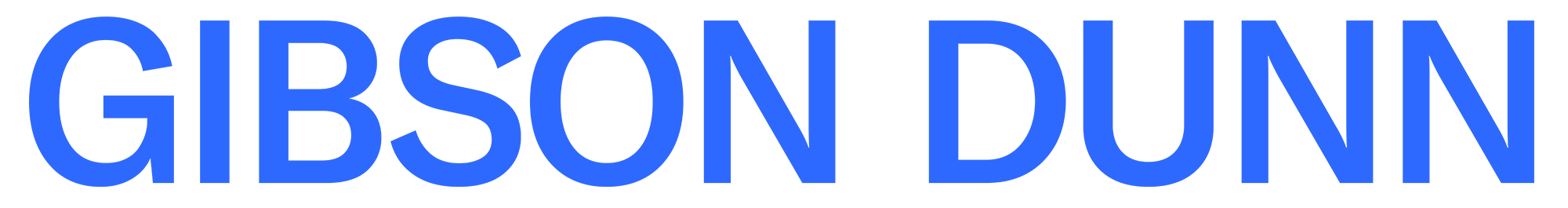
- Headquarters: Los Angeles, California
- No. of offices: 23
- No. of attorneys: 2,200+
- Major practice areas: Litigation, General Practice
- Key people: Barbara L. Becker (chair)
- Revenue: ▲US$4.211 billion (2025)
- Profit per equity partner: US$8.89 million (2025)
- Date founded: 1890
- Company type: Law firm
- Website: gibsondunn.com

Gibson, Dunn & Crutcher LLP is an American multinational white-shoe law firm. Founded in 1890, the firm has more than 2,200 attorneys and 1,000 staff in 23 offices across the world, including North America, Europe, Asia, and the Middle East.

== History ==
Gibson Dunn was founded in May 1890 by John D. Bicknel and Walter Trask. In 1897, Judge James Gibson joined the firm. Six years later, at the suggestion of mutual client Henry E. Huntington, the firm merged with the law firm of former Los Angeles city attorney William Ellsworth Dunn and assistant city attorney Albert Crutcher, forming Bicknell, Gibson, Trask, Dunn & Crutcher, while creating the largest law firm in Los Angeles at the time. In 1911, the firm was renamed Gibson, Dunn & Crutcher.

In 1914, the firm recruited its first attorney from Harvard Law School, Henry Prince, marking its transition to methods developed in the Eastern law schools. By 1931, name partners Gibson, Dunn and Crutcher were deceased. New Deal legislation during the 1930s stimulated labor practice legal work in the firm. In 1943, the firm had 25 lawyers, increased to 39 by 1954, then to 63 a decade later.

The firm opened offices in Washington, D.C., and in Paris, France, in 1977, and expanded further within the U.S. during the 20th century, as well as to Europe and Asia, opening its London office in 1980, and operating 21 law practices globally. In 1980, the firm had about 200 lawyers and was rapidly expanding, to about 700 by 1991. In 1984, assistant attorney general and future solicitor general Theodore Olson returned to the firm, where he was previously a partner for nine years, to start one of the first appellate practices at a large law firm. In 1989, amid American trade expansion, the firm also became associated with the Brussels law firm of Van Bael & Bellis.

In 1991, legally-trained historian Jane Wilson (later Adler), completed a book for the firm, Gibson, Dunn & Crutcher, lawyers: An early history, which received a Donald H. Pflueger Local History Award in 1993, for outstanding scholarship in depictions of economic growth in Southern California.

Barbara Becker joined the firm with mentor Dennis Friedman in 2000, moving from an M&A partnership at Chadbourne & Parke. She was elected chair and managing partner in 2021.

In 2011, University of Arizona Press published F. Daniel Frost and the Rise of the Modern American Law Firm by University of Arizona College of law professor (later dean emerita), Toni M. Massaro, a biography of partner F. Daniel "Dan" Frost, who had joined the firm in 1950, becoming the managing partner in 1979.

Gibson Dunn litigated in an attempt to give cities more authority in breaking up homeless encampments. In 2020, during the COVID-19 pandemic, the firm litigated in an attempt to relocate homeless persons from the Upper West Side to downtown Manhattan. Randy Mastro, a Gibson Dunn partner, had his home vandalized in October. Individuals on either side of the relocation dispute expressed regret of the vandalism.

Amid clashes at some college campuses, following the onset of the Gaza War; on November 1, 2023, Gibson Dunn was one of two dozen law firms that submitted a letter to 14 American law school deans, denouncing antisemitism, Islamophobia, and racism, and advising those mentoring future law graduates of entrenched workplace policies against harassment or discrimination at their firms. The firm was also one of 17 global law firms that signed a public statement denouncing growing anti-Semitic attacks in the U.S., published in The American Lawyer on May 27, 2021.

In October 2025, the Anti-Defamation League announced a partnership with the firm to launch a nationwide legal service network to support victims of antisemitism and provide legal counsel on a pro-bono basis.

== Notable cases ==
Early clients of the firm include several utility and gas and oil companies, such as Los Angeles Gas & Electric Company; Amalgamated, Union, and Akron oil companies; and Henry E. Huntington and Pacific Light & Power Company. Gibson Dunn attorneys have argued more than 160 cases before the United States Supreme Court.

Some of the firm's notable cases and clients include:

- SpaceX, in structuring and advising on the company's $75 billion IPO in 2026.
- Chevron, in its long-running, $27 billion environmental dispute in Ecuador. According to The Intercept, Gibson Dunn has hired private investigators to track Steven Donziger and created "a team of hundreds of lawyers to fight him". This resulted in a boycott launched in April 2021 by the student group Law Students for Climate Accountability.
- CNN, in its lawsuit against President Trump and many of his staff on the basis of Jim Acosta's right to a "hard pass", a clearance to enter the White House.
- Xerox, in the financing of its approximately $1.5 billion acquisition of Lexmark International.
- American Foundation for Equal Rights, in its litigation challenging California's Proposition 8 and supporting marriage equality. The litigation ultimately led to the overturning of Proposition 8.
- U.S. Conference of Catholic Bishops, in its suit against the federal government seeking a restoration of federal support for the church's immigration programs.
- Mother and child victims of domestic violence at the U.S. Supreme Court regarding the Hague Convention on the Civil Aspects of International Child Abduction.
- Apple, Inc., in its patent infringement suit against Samsung (Apple v. Samsung) relating to the Galaxy Nexus smartphone, and won an injunction in June 2012 blocking the sale of the Galaxy Nexus phone in the United States. The injunction was vacated in October 2012 based on the results of the trial. It also represented Apple in Epic Games v. Apple, a lawsuit related to Apple's practices in the App Store and the removal of Fortnite from the App Store.
- Mark Zuckerberg, founder of Facebook, in a $17 billion contract dispute with purported seed money financier Paul Ceglia in 2011 The case was thrown out and Ceglia was charged with fraud in 2012; he became a fugitive.
- George W. Bush, in Bush v. Gore, the litigation contesting certification of Florida's results in the 2000 United States presidential election. Theodore Olsen, the partner who argued the case for Bush in the Supreme Court, went on to serve as solicitor general in the Bush administration.
- Citizens United, firm partner Theodore B. Olson successfully argued Citizens United v. FEC (2010) in its favor. The verdict sanctioned businesses' limitless campaign spending, which, according to nonpartisan legal organization Campaign Legal Center, promoted corruption and black money.
- Intel, in its defense against several multibillion-dollar antitrust lawsuits filed by AMD and the European Union.
- NBC Universal in its 2009 contract dispute with Conan O'Brien.
- Viacom, in its billion-dollar copyright infringement lawsuit against Google and YouTube in Viacom International Inc. v. YouTube, Inc. After multiple rulings at the District Court and Appellate Court, the case was settled in 2014.
- Governor Chris Christie hired Gibson Dunn attorney Randy Mastro to conduct an internal investigation of the circumstances surrounding the Fort Lee lane closure scandal and representing the Governor in a later federal investigation. The firm was later criticized by U.S. District Judge Susan Wigenton for its methods of record keeping, and accused the firm of "opacity and gamesmanship".
- Plaintiffs in Haaland v. Brackeen, pro bono litigation seeking to overturn the Indian Child Welfare Act. This has led to accusations that Gibson Dunn was seeking to weaken federal protections for Native American tribes overall, opening the way for corporate exploitation of natural resources or Native American gaming.
- VMware, in its $61 billion acquisition by Broadcom.
- Pioneer Natural Resources, in its $59.5 billion acquisition by ExxonMobil.
- Hewlett-Packard, in its £7 billion bid for Autonomy Corporation.
- Kraft. in its $19.7 billion bid for Cadbury.
- Heineken, in its $7.6 billion buyout of Mexican brewing conglomerate FEMSA.
- Collaboration with the Center for Individual Rights and the Election Law Center in representing Arnold Davis in Davis v. Guam, successfully challenging Guam's race-based voting restrictions.
- International Paper, represented by partner David Fotouhi in lawsuits to defend its use of PFAS ("forever chemicals") during the 2010s.
- Alliance for Automotive Innovation, partner David Fotouhi challenged the EPA's asbestos ban, filing an amicus brief, in October 2024, arguing that the agency had "failed to demonstrate that chrysotile asbestos presents an unreasonable risk of injury." Fatouhi was employed at the EPA during the first Trump Administrations, and was appointed Deputy Administrator of the Environmental Protection Agency) during Trump's second term.
- Dole Food Company, in a 2007 multibillion-dollar tort suit in Nicaragua involving allegations of farm worker sterility stemming from Dole's use of certain pesticides. After the firm uncovered substantial evidence of fraud and a conspiracy between the plaintiffs and Nicaraguan judges to extort Dole out of billions with manufactured claims, courts in the United States dismissed multiple related suits against Dole and refused to enforce several Nicaraguan judgments.
- Walt Disney in his efforts to establish Disneyland.
- Gibson Dunn has argued in favor of laws that bar homeless encampments in public spaces. Gibson Dunn represented Boise, Idaho in a case that challenged the constitutionality of the city’s ban on homeless encampments. The case, Martin v. Boise, was settled in 2021 when the city agreed to not cite or arrest people for sleeping outdoors when no shelter was available. The firm represented the city of Grants Pass, Oregon in the 2024 Supreme Court decision which held that bans on sleeping in public do not violate the Eighth Amendment; the decision effectively overturned Martin v. Boise.
- Serena Williams, in her acquisition of an ownership stake in Toronto Tempo.

== Criticism ==
In 2007, the Montana Supreme Court ruled that Gibson Dunn "acted with actual malice" in its lawsuit against art expert Steve Seltzer. Seltzer asserted that a painting attributed to Charles Marion Russell was, in fact, the work of his grandfather, Olaf Carl Seltzer, diminishing the painting's value. The Supreme Court concluded that Gibson Dunn sought to use the legal system to intimidate Seltzer, which "amounts to legal thuggery". The Court upheld the $9.9 million punitive damage award to Seltzer that was initially awarded in 2005, but was appealed by both sides.

In 2023, the firm was sanctioned by a San Francisco District Court and ordered to pay $925,000 for its efforts to make the litigation unnecessarily expensive and difficult for the plaintiffs in a consumer privacy lawsuit for the Facebook–Cambridge Analytica data scandal. The judge found that Gibson Dunn engaged in a "sustained, concerted, bad-faith effort to throw obstacle after obstacle in front of the plaintiffs" to push them to settle.

In 2024, ProPublica published an expose, '"The Law Firm Helping Big Oil Weaponize the First Amendment", characterizing Gibson Dunn as "'playing both sides' of free speech, using it to defend fossil fuel companies and silence the industry's critics".

== Notable firm alumni ==
- Preet Bharara, U.S. Attorney for the Southern District of New York.
- Andrew L. Brasher, judge on the United States Court of Appeals for the Eleventh Circuit.
- Patrick J. Bumatay, judge on the United States Court of Appeals for the Ninth Circuit.
- Aileen Cannon, judge on the United States District Court for the Southern District of Florida known for presiding over the federal criminal case against former President Donald Trump.
- James B. Comey, former director of the Federal Bureau of Investigation, known for overseeing the FBI investigation into Hillary Clinton’s use of a private email server.
- Gregg Costa, former judge on the United States Court of Appeals for the Fifth Circuit.
- Tom Cotton, U.S. Senator from Arkansas.
- Stuart Delery, former White House Counsel
- Miguel Estrada, U.S. Supreme Court practitioner and former nominee to the U.S. Court of Appeals for the D.C. Circuit.
- Charlie Falconer, former Lord Chancellor and Secretary of State for Justice under Prime Minister Tony Blair.
- Josh Hawley, U.S. Senator from Missouri.
- James C. Ho, judge of the U.S. Court of Appeals for the Fifth Circuit.
- Ron Kirk, former United States Trade Representative and first African American to hold the position.
- Andrea Lucas, chair of the United States Equal Employment Opportunity Commission .
- Trevor N. McFadden, judge on the United States District Court for the District of Columbia.
- Carl J. Nichols, judge on the United States District Court for the District of Columbia.
- Theodore Olson, former United States Solicitor General.
- Aulana L. Peters, former commissioner of the U.S. Securities and Exchange Commission and the first African American to hold the position.
- Jennifer H. Rearden, judge on the United States District Court for the Southern District of New York.
- Eugene Scalia, former United States Secretary of Labor.
- William French Smith, former United States Attorney General.
- Róbert Ragnar Spanó, former President of the European Court of Human Rights.
- Robert D. Sack, senior judge on the United States Court of Appeals for the Second Circuit.
- Ken Starr, former United States Solicitor General and Independent Counsel in the Clinton investigation.
- Lawrence VanDyke, judge on the United States Court of Appeals for the Ninth Circuit.
- Justin R. Walker, judge on the United States Court of Appeals for the District of Columbia Circuit.
- Jeff Wall, former Solicitor General of the United States.
- Peter J. Wallison, former White House Counsel.
- Debra Wong Yang, former U.S. Attorney for the Central District of California.

== See also ==
- List of largest law firms by profits per partner
