= Über den Tellerrand =

Logo

Über den Tellerrand e. V. is a nonprofit organization engaged in the integration of refugees. The headquarters of the organization is in Berlin, Germany. It was founded in April 2014. The main focus of the organization is to have citizens and refugees live and work together side by side with each side learning from the others. In July 2017 the organization was active in 25 cities in Germany, Austria, Switzerland and the Netherlands.

The German name, Über den Tellerrand, literally means "Beyond the Edge of the Plate". It is a German expression, meaning roughly "beyond the horizon." It is especially relevant for a program that deals with bringing people together through food.

In addition to the Berlin office, there are 25 satellite programs in Germany and neighboring countries, and one in the United States, in Columbus, Ohio.

== History ==
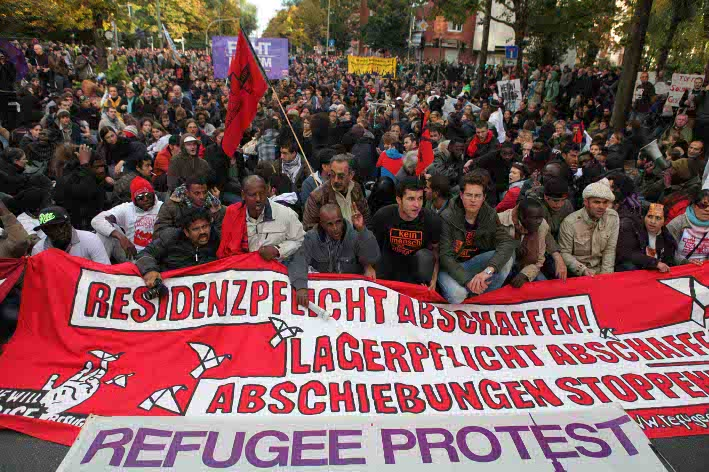

The concept began in 2013 when large protests of refugees occurred in Berlin at Oranienplatz. The protesters had read a great deal about refugees, but had no personal direct experience of them, so everything they read was theoretical. People had lost sight of the fact that the people protesting were individual human beings, each with their own story. So they decided to get to know the refugees on a more personal level. They began by cooking together with them at Oranienplatz in the Berlin area of Kreuzberg. From the cooking sessions they developed a cook book. The cook book included recipes and also the personal stories of the refugees who contributed them. The cook book itself was developed during the Funpreneur competition organized by the Free University of Berlin. During the competition a product needs to be developed and marketed within an eight-week period. The first book included 21 recipes gathered from refugees living in shelters or who been part of the protests at Oranienplatz. The team received the Funpreneur Prize in December 2013. Four hundred copies were printed and quickly sold. There was so much demand that the team realized that there was potential to professionalize the endeavor.

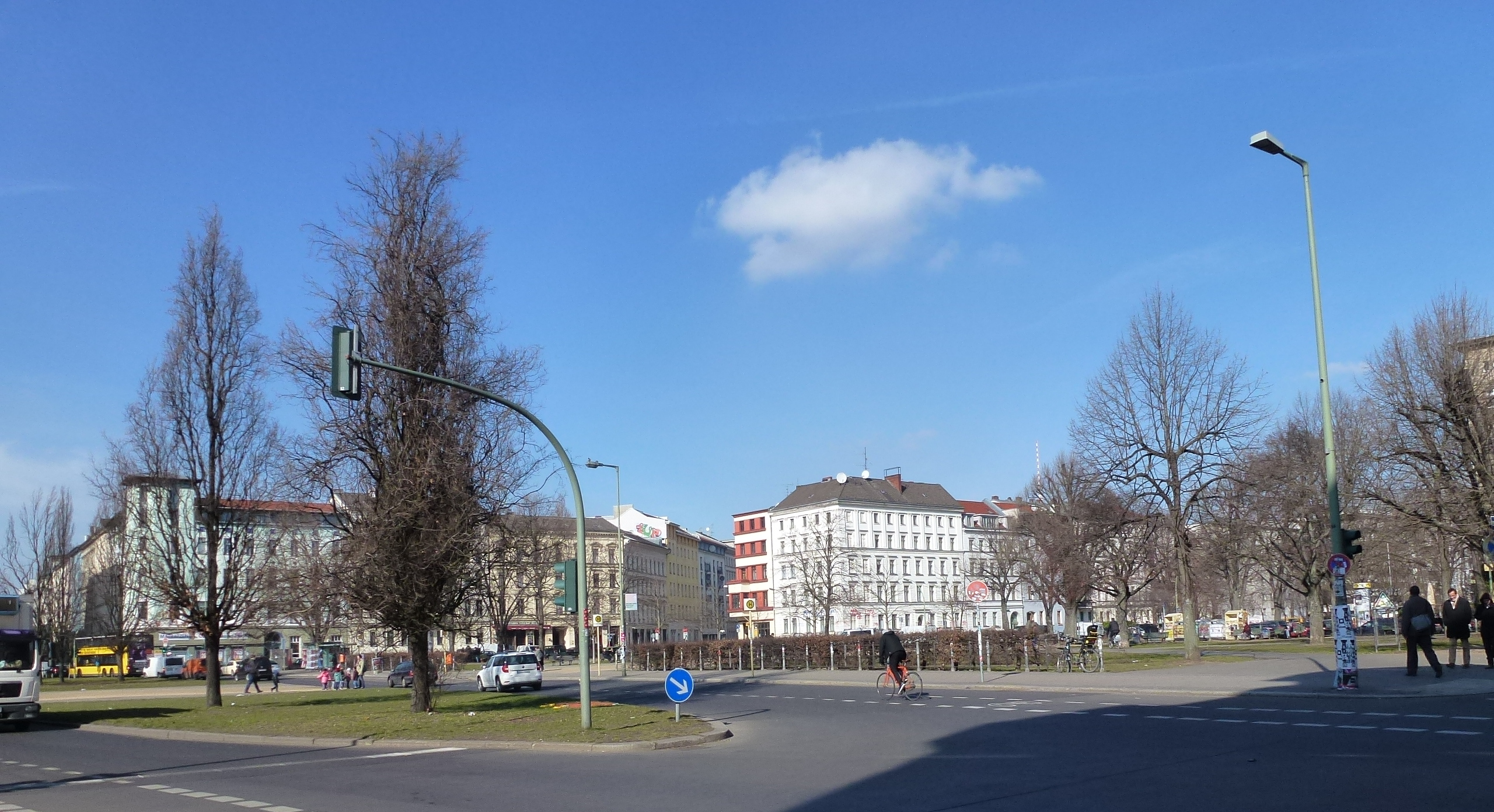
The Oranienplatz at Berlin- Kreuzberg

The cooking event with refugees gave the participants the idea to have refugees give cooking lessons. The idea was developed with the help of the Social Impact Lab in Berlin in the spring of 2014. It was important for the founders to have locals and refugees come together as equals. Through the leading part that refugees play in the cooking lessons "the humility of a petitioner was replaced by the confidence of an expert."

Later a cook book was published that included 36 recipes from 27 refugees. The cooks came from countries such as Afghanistan, Syria, Guinea, Niger, Macedonia and Chechnya. A second cook book was later published with recipes in both German and English.

From the beginning the idea of the Foundation was to have refugees teaching the locals how to cook meals from their culture, and thus present their culture through the meal. During the process locals who had little idea about the concept of refugees came to have more understanding of their situations and more respect for their cultures.

== Foundation work ==
The Foundation has several projects with which it is trying to integrate refugees. Among those are the Champion program, the Satellite program, the Kitchen on the Run, the Job Buddy program, and Building Bridges. The Champion program is meant to create social networks for refugees. The Foundation supports the process through coaching the volunteers and providing them with infrastructure and resources. Among the activities are cooking together, doing sports together, singing, gardening, beekeeping, and language exchanges. The satellite program involves supporting the satellites in other cities and countries beyond Berlin. In total there are 25 satellites of Über Den Tellerrand in the Netherlands, Germany, Austria and Switzerland, and the U.S. The U.S. satellite, in Columbus, Ohio, was created by a woman from Ohio who attended one of the Berlin cooking events and was so impressed with the idea that she began one in her city at home. The Foundation supports the satellites with structured guidelines and offers consulting. Additionally, every year the foundation organizes a satellite congress in which the communities from different cities can meet and further develop the concept. Kitchen on the Run is a mobile kitchen that traveled through Italy, France, Germany, the Netherlands and Sweden in the year 2016. In each country locals and refugees were brought together to cook together. Them aim of Kitchen on the Run is to spread the idea of Über Den Tellerrand internationally and to build up a network. The project was supported by the Advocate Europe Program. In 2017 the program is focusing on communities within Germany, especially ones where there have been tensions between locals and newcomers. In the future a fleet of similar mobile kitchens will be built to be used in different regions. In the Job Buddy program experienced employees support refugees during the process of orientation to the job market. They also help refugees with writing job applications and preparing for job interviews. The Foundation supports the program further with specialized lectures and workshops. In the Building Bridges program a team consisting of a refugee who has already been the respective country for some time, and a local, together support a newly arrived refugee. By pairing a local and an already integrated refugee it is easier to overcome language barriers, and for the team to understand the need of the newly arrived refugee faster.

== Awards ==
- "Ort im Land der Ideen" (Place in the land of ideas) 2016
- "Aktiv für Demokratie und Toleranz (Active for democracy and tolerance) 2015
- "Gastronomischer Innovator" (Gastronomic Innovator) 2015
- Advocate Europe 2015
- Exhibition at the EXPO Mailand 2015 in the German pavillon

== Publications ==
- Rezepte für ein besseres Wir (Recipes for a better us) Pearl, 2014. ISBN 978-3-95760-002-8.
- Eine Prise Heimat: Das Fusions-Kochbuch (A pinch of home: The fusion-cook book) Riva, 2016. ISBN 978-3-86883-606-6.
