= Drachenbrunnen =

Fountain in Berlin, Germany

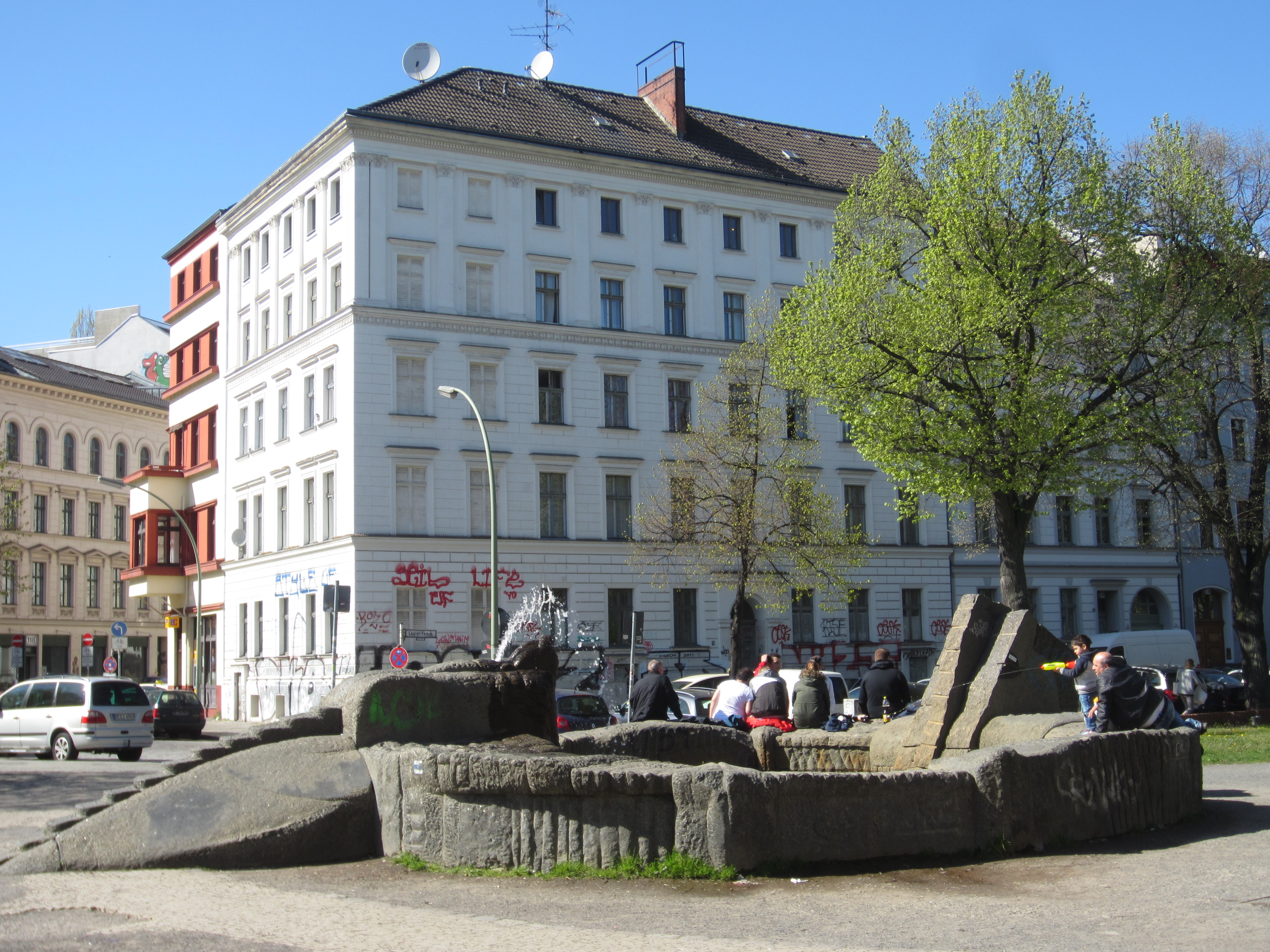
- The fountain in 2016
- Location: Kreuzberg, Berlin
- 52.5029°N 13.4162°E

Drachenbrunnen is a fountain at Oranienplatz in Kreuzberg, Berlin, Germany.
