= Voice Refugee Forum =

The Voice Refugee Forum is a self-organised group of refugees which has been active throughout Germany for over twenty years. It was founded in 1994 as The Voice Africa Forum by four refugees in a detention centre in Muhlhausen, Germany in order to aid resistance to the military dictatorship in Nigeria. The group pushed for the release of political prisoners and refugees. The organisation celebrated its silver jubilee in 2019. The group is credited with giving "rise in the 1990s to a wave of German based self-organised groups of non-status migrants"

== History ==
The Voice was active in the self-organised refugee fight since 1997 to close the notorious refugee detention centres Tambach-Dietharz and Jena Forst a former Soviet Army barracks in Jena Forest in Thuringia.

During the G7 summit 1999 in Cologne, activists of the Voice were the main participants of the Caravan for the Rights of Refugees and Migrants 16-day hunger strike of refugees and the occupation of the Alliance '90/The Greens office in Cologne.

The forum has since become networked across Germany and for a while had offices London, firstly at the London Action Resource Centre before being forced to relocate to the Limehouse Town Hall. The groups are all refugee-lead and self-organised with an emphasis on fighting deportation and detention throughout the world.

== OPlatz (Oranienplatz) Movement ==
The forum participated in the OPlatz Movement, Berlin 2013. Bashir Zakaria, an activist from the forum gave an interview to We Refugees. Here he gave a first hand account of a boat journey across the mediterranean and subsequent experiences in Italy, France and Germany concerning the problems refugees experienced being excluded from paid work. Another refugee participant of the O-Platz occupations and member of the Voice Refugee Forum gave accounts of police harassment and segregation.

== Forst (film) ==
The Voice Refugee Forum participated with Ascan Breuer, Ursula Hansbauer and Wolfgang Konrad in making the film Forst in 2005. The film won the Diagonale Prize for Short Feature and Short Documentary Film that year.
