= Homelessness in Oregon =

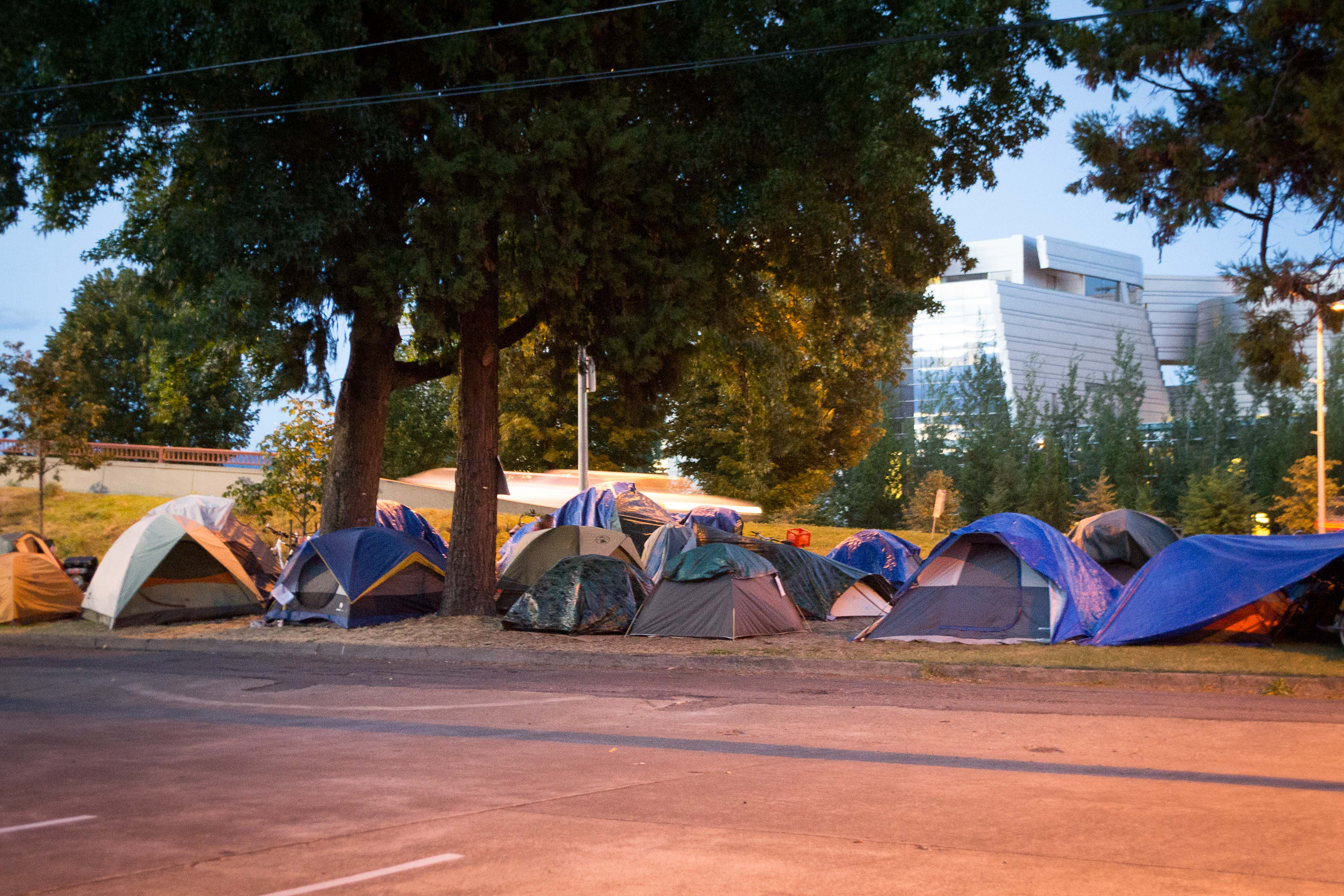
Whoville Homeless Camp in Eugene, Oregon, 2013

In 2016, a report from the Department of Housing and Urban Development (HUD) revealed that the U.S. state of Oregon had an estimated homeless population of 13,238 with about 60.5% of these people still unsheltered. In 2017, these numbers were even higher. As of January 2017, Oregon has an estimated 13,953 individuals experiencing homelessness. Of this homeless population, 1,083 are family households, 1,251 are veterans, 1,462 are unaccompanied young adults (aged 18–24), and 3,387 are individuals experiencing chronic homelessness. As of 2022, 17,959 people total experienced homelessness in Oregon, with 2,157 individuals being youth under 18, 6,671 being female, 10,931 being male, and 131 being transgender. Also among the 17,959 total homeless in 2022, 15,876 were Non-Hispanic/Non-Latino, 2,083 were Hispanic/Latino, 13,960 were white, 1,172 were Black, African American, or African, 101 were Asian or Asian American, 880 were Native American, and those of multiple race were 1,619. Oregon has seen an increase in its total homeless population consistently every year since 2010. In last three years specifically Oregon has seen a 98.5% increase 2021-2022, 22.5% increase 2020-2021, and a 13.1% increase 2019-2020.

Homeless people have found themselves unwelcome near businesses in Portland. Some of the complaints given are that homeless people 'scare customers away'; 'are too noisy'; and that 'they block the way'. A city ordinance called 'sidewalk obstruction ordinance' was an ordinance which homeless advocates complained "criminalizes homelessness". This was however, quashed by a judge's decision in 2009. This decision left the police and business owners with disorderly conduct which the police chief said comes with the difficulty of proving intent and finding witnesses.

== Portland ==
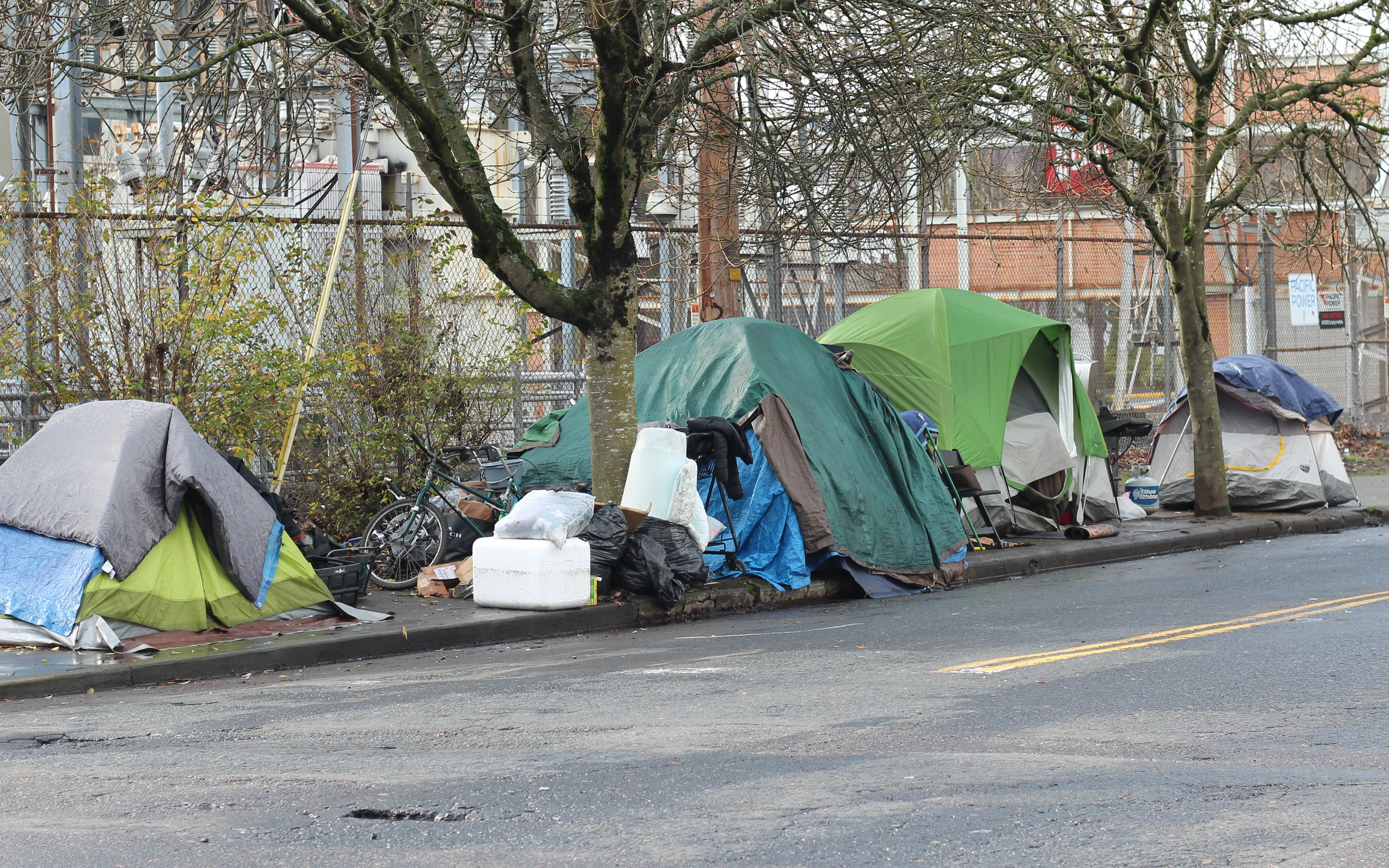
An encampment in Lloyd District neighborhood of Portland in 2020.

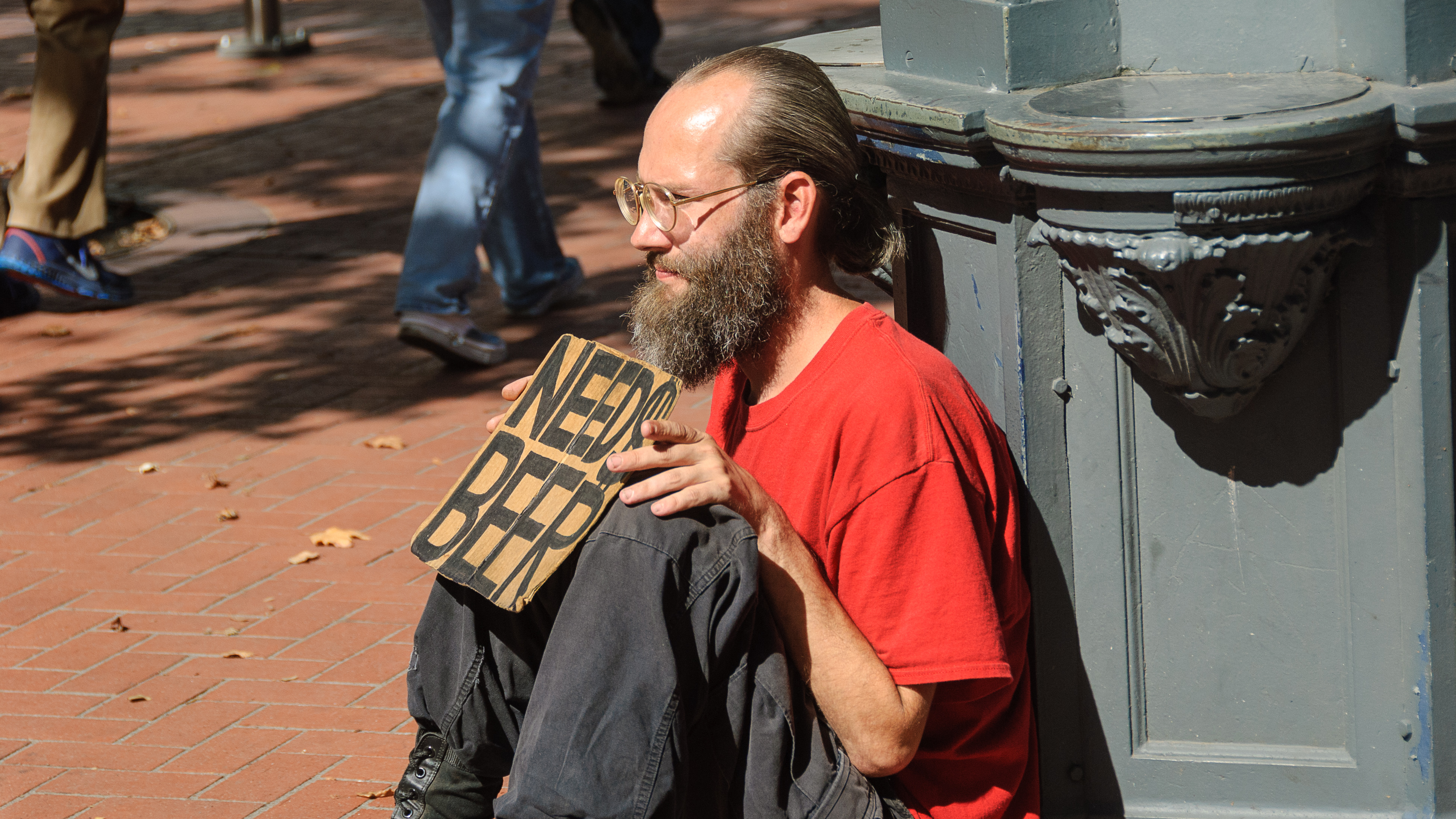
Male transient in Portland, Oregon, in 2016

In Portland, the local government took efforts in trying to become a zero-homeless city, which failed to meet its mission. This is through a 10-year plan which they proposed in 2005 which states that they would move people into affordable housing rather than moving them to temporary shelters.

Illegal camps have been growing in and around Portland since the beginning of COVID-19 pandemic. Some of those have become a public safety and health concerns. One of the leading complaints about transient camps in Portland has been the used hypodermic needles on the ground which has been worsening as city suspended cleanups during the pandemic. Businesses in Old Town Chinatown have voiced concerns about the increasing number of tents A business owner and Old Town Chinatown neighborhood board member interviewed by The Oregonian said the number of tents have grown significantly since the pandemic and have heard from his customers that they don't feel comfortable visiting the area. Many tents on the streets originated from Multnomah County. Between June 2020 and September 2022, the county spent $1.6 million to purchase 22,700 tents to hand out and $416,052 to buy 69,514 tarps to hand out. COVID-19 relief funds was used for this.

In 2026, Portland mayor Keith Wilson requested contributions of $6 million from Washington County and $4 million from Clackamas County to help fund homeless services in Portland. The request was refused by both neighboring counties.

=== Handling of illegal-camp cleanups ===
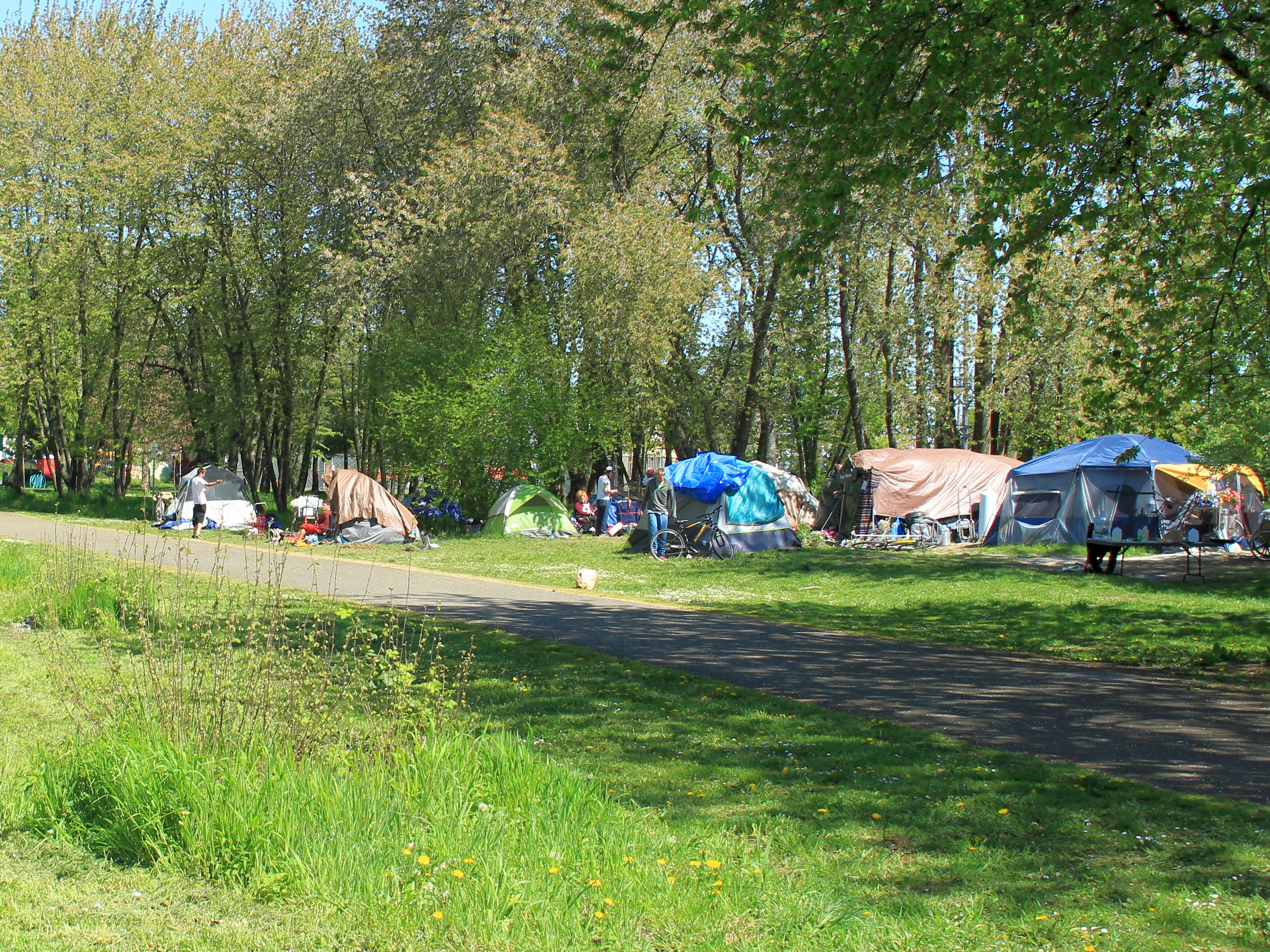
An encampment in Northern Portland.

Multiple news outlet reported on the city auditor's report on the city's handling of illegal campsite clean ups by the Homelessness/Urban Camping Impact Reduction Program. Since 2015, the City of Portland implemented a streamlined campsite complaint intake. City contractors then removed tents, items and other items and stored them. The database was to prioritize cleanup based on "biohazards, garbage and other factors, such as whether campers are aggressive or openly using drugs". The Oregonian summarized that the auditors found little evidence prioritization was occurring and no clear indication of what criteria were invoked in selecting which camps are to be removed or not removed and auditors documented the city often ignored hundreds of complaints made by residents. The newspaper commented "That non-response doesn’t comport with the crackdown on illegal camping instituted by Mayor Ted Wheeler earlier in his term." The audit conducted in summer and fall of 2018 reported that the city needed to improve communications to illegal campers as well as complainants. The auditor recommends providing complainants with a status update. In 2019, the city announced they intend to do that with a new app that helps people "better record and understand HUCIRP" As of June 2020, the status update for reporting party has yet to be implemented per city's own status update.

In October 2022, Mayor Wheeler addressed the homeless crisis in Portland again, noting how it is "nothing short of a humanitarian catastrophe". He addressed how the homeless population should be moved to the resources that would benefit them the most. The most current resolution plan for the homeless crisis in Portland is to establish three large designated camping sites. Mayor Wheeler is hoping to begin this resolution no later than 18 months after the funding is confirmed.

These designated camping areas would be able to serve approximately 125 people and would "provide access to services such as food, hygiene, litter collection and treatment for mental health and substance abuse".

=== Safe rest villages ===
Safe rest villages are transitional housing units in small community of 30-60 tiny homes for people who had been homeless.

The concept revolves around the establishment of low-barrier tiny homes, and currently, there are seven villages strategically located throughout the city, ensuring accessibility across various neighborhoods.

== Deschutes County ==
Deschutes County, Oregon is currently experiencing a large population growth. As of 2022, there are roughly 1,286 homeless people in Deschutes county. This is a 17% increase from 2021. The Emergency Houselessness Task Force has developed a crisis plan in hope to decrease these numbers.

Between 2013 and February 2019, the police department has seen a 60% increase in "unwanted person" complaints. Homeless represent 3% of population while representing 52% of arrests.

== City of Grants Pass ==
Grants Pass is a city in and the county seat of Josephine County, Oregon. It is the 15th most populous city in Oregon in the 2020 United States census.

Grants Pass adopted ordinances generally prohibiting sleeping in public, camping in public, and camping in a city park. Prior to Martin v. Boise (2018), the city functionally equated sleeping in public parks with camping. After Martin, however, the city amended the definition of camping to capture the use of bedding, or the placement of a stove or fire to "maintain[] a temporary place to live." An individual who violated these ordinances faced civil citations and fines and could be temporarily barred from a city park for receiving two relevant citations. If an individual returned to a city park while under such an exclusion order, they faced potential criminal prosecution.

=== City Grants Pass v. Johnson ===
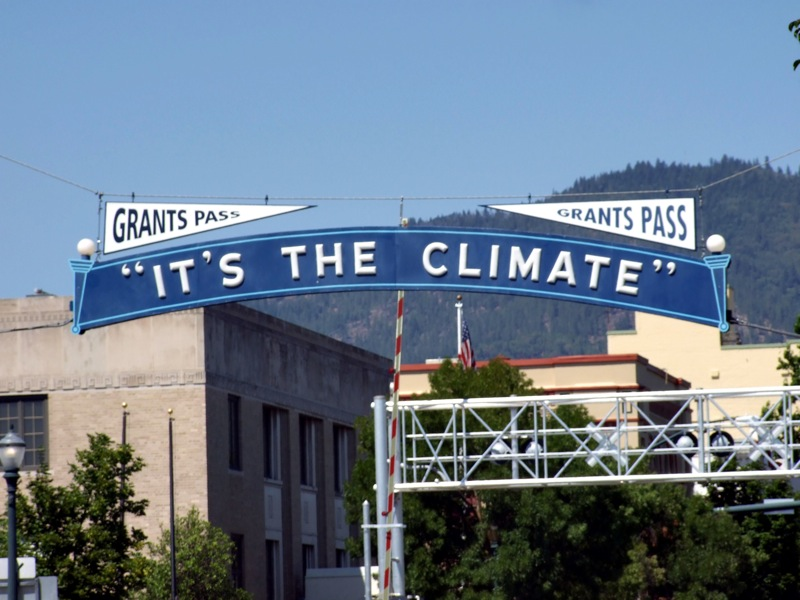
Grants Pass, Oregon, sought to impose anti-camping, anti-sleeping, and parking exclusion ordinances to dissuade homeless individuals from residing on its public land.

The Oregon Law Center, which supports low-income Oregonians, filed a class action lawsuit on behalf of Debra Blake (1959–2021) in the United States District Court for the District of Oregon in October 2018. At the time of filing, Blake had been homeless in Grants Pass, Oregon, between eight and ten years, occasionally entering temporary transitional housing. Grants Pass had levied civil fines against violators of anti-camping, anti-sleeping, and parking exclusion ordinances. The city imposed criminal penalties of trespassing on repeat violators who continued to reside on public land.

In August 2019, Magistrate Judge Mark D. Clarke granted the motion for class certification because the United Community Action Network's January 2019 point-in-time count identified at least 600 homeless people in Josephine County, Oregon, who are collectively affected by the city of Grants Pass's ability to enforce the ordinance. Clarke found Blake representative of this homeless population, and she was deemed capable of adequately representing their legal interests.

In July 2020, Clarke ruled that because Grants Pass lacked any homeless shelters that satisfy the United States Department of Housing and Urban Development's criteria, its anti-camping, anti-sleeping, and parking exclusion ordinances violated the Ninth Circuit's precedent in Martin v. Boise. Clarke recommended that Grants Pass pursue its public health interests through narrowly tailored restrictions on the time, place, and manner of sleeping on public land. Furthermore, Clarke held that these ordinances violated the Eighth Amendment's Excessive Fines Clause because homeless people unable to afford shelter are unlikely to be able to afford fines imposed for the unavoidable, life-sustaining act of sleeping.

At the time of filing, police officers could immediately issue a written order excluding a person from all parks in Grants Pass based on two or more alleged violations of these ordinances. Since the exclusion order was not stayed pending appeals, the District Court held that the city of Grants Pass's enforcement of the ordinances also violated the Due Process Clause because residents would be deprived of their liberty interest in visiting public parks during a potentially long appeals process.

During a March 2013 community meeting staged by the Grants Pass City Council, Council President Lily Morgan organized the brainstorming of anti-camping ordinances to "make it uncomfortable enough for homeless individuals in our city so they will want to move on down the road". The Oregon District Court cited this statement as evidence that the anti-camping ordinances were enacted to prosecute the status of being homeless, rather than uniformly prosecuting acts like parking vehicles on public land.

=== Supreme Court ruling ===
In a 6-3 decision authored by Justice Gorsuch, the Supreme Court of the United States sided with the city and held that the "enforcement of generally applicable laws regulating camping on public property does not constitute 'cruel and unusual punishment.'" The Court first reasoned that although other constitutional provisions may limit what conduct a government may criminalize, the Cruel and Unusual Punishments clause focuses on the "method or kind of punishment a government may impose for the violation of criminal statutes." The history behind the clause suggests the founders were concerned with the imposition of "certain barbaric punishments" that were "calculated to 'superad[d] terror, pain, or disgrace'" and had "long fallen out of use." The criminal punishments that the city imposed for violation of its anticamping ordinances—fines and a possible 30-day jail sentence for repeat offenders—were not cruel or unusual under these standards, according to the Court.

Despite concluding that the Grants Pass ordinances were not cruel and unusual punishment under any of the plaintiffs' theories, the Court acknowledged that other legal doctrines are available to protect "those in our criminal justice system from a conviction." The Court observed that many jurisdictions recognize defenses to criminal charges such as necessity, insanity, diminished-capacity, and duress that defendants could assert if charged under anticamping ordinances like those in Grants Pass. The Court also recognized that the Constitution provides additional limits on state prosecutorial power such as fair notice of criminal laws, equal protection under the law, and prohibitions on selective prosecution.

In her dissenting opinion, Justice Sotomayor would have held that the ordinances violate Robinson v. California's command that the government may not punish an individual for their status. She reasoned that the ordinances punish the involuntary status of being homeless (lacking temporary shelter) by punishing people for the defining conduct of that status (sleeping outside). She further argued that punishing an "essential bodily function," such as sleeping, does not amount to cognizable conduct under Robinson.

== See also ==
- City of Grants Pass v. Johnson
- Homelessness in the United States by state
- Joint Office of Homeless Services
