= Street Roots =

Homeless advocacy group and newspaper in Portland, Oregon, U.S.

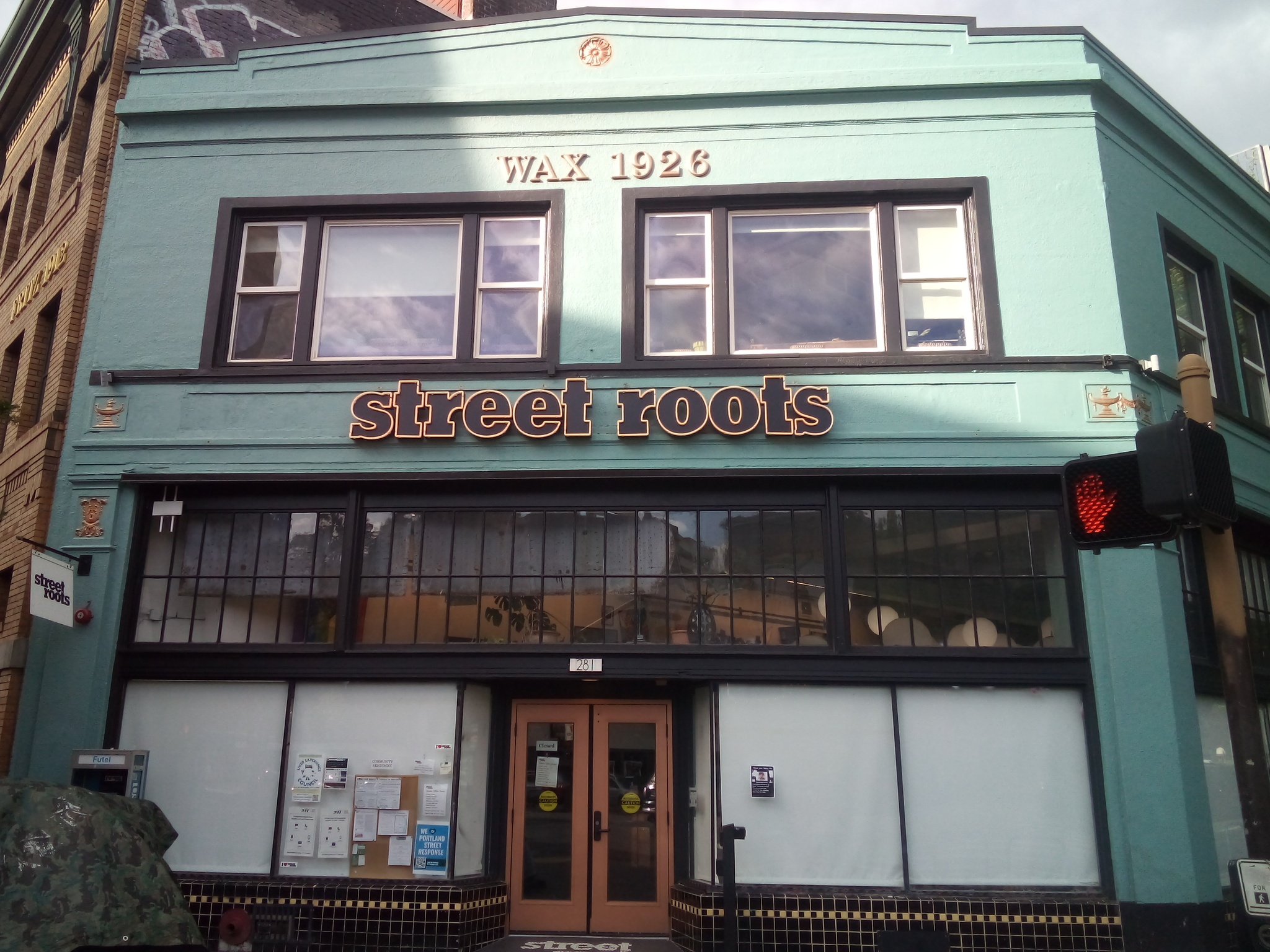
- Street Roots office
- Type: Weekly alternative newspaper
- Format: Compact
- President: Jill Geltmaker
- Editor: K. Rambo
- Founded: 1998; 28 years ago
- Political alignment: Homeless advocacy
- Headquarters: Portland, Oregon, U.S.
- Circulation: 10,000 (as of 2018)
- Website: streetroots.org

Street Roots is a homeless advocacy group based in Portland, Oregon, United States, and publishes a weekly alternative newspaper that covers homeless issues. The newsprint is sold by and for homeless people in Portland. The paper is published every week and sold through vendors who are currently or formerly homeless. The paper's editorial position is homeless advocacy. Vendors purchase the paper for 25 cents and sell them for $1, and keep the difference of 75 cents. The paper features alternative news, interviews, and poetry written by local journalists as well as the homeless and those who work with them.

== History ==
It originally started out as a newsletter called Burnside Cadillac in 1990, which started the vendor model in 1996. The name was still Burnside Cadillac in 1998. During the same year, it first appeared as Street Roots as an "offshoot" to Burnside Cadillac. Israel Bayer was hired as executive director a few years later, and remained in that position for 15 years. He announced his departure in 2017.

In 2007, it was described as the "most vocal opponent" of a proposed "sit-lie ordinance" championed by the Portland Business Alliance and then-Mayor Tom Potter. Its acceptance of a $30,000 grant from Street Access For Everyone (SAFE), at a time when its annual budget was $90,000, prompted concerns about editorial influence. The funding was designated for printing 10,000 resource guides that listed services for the homeless and an employee to assemble the guides. Street Roots' executive director at the time, Israel Bayer, asserted the paper would not change its editorial position against the sit-lie ordinance. Kyle Chisek, a non-voting member of SAFE at the time, announced the money wasn't intended to influence newspaper's editorial position. Chisek added that SAFE committee and Street Roots shared commitment to "providing a service for the homeless." Initially, the city was concerned that this guide might duplicate services already offered by the government and other non-profit agencies.

The Rose City Resource, a guide to local services related to homelessness, began as a four-page section of the paper in 1999, was launched as a separate publication following the SAFE grant. It served as a model for a similar publication established in Seattle in 2018. By 2018, the guide had grown to 104 pages, and was published twice a year.

In recent years, Street Roots has continued to take positions on public policy related to homelessness.

The organization had purchased a new building in the Old Town Chinatown neighborhood in 2023 in order to expand. The organization re-located to the new building in October 2024. The move was partially funded by a $1.1 million grant from Portland Clean Energy Fund which is funded by tax imposed on large retailers.

The former executive director, Kaia Sand, whose salary as of 2023 was $81,122, went on a leave in October 2024 and resigned in December 2024. Willamette Week's request for resignation reason was not answered. Sand became the executive director in 2017.

== See also ==
- Homelessness in Oregon
- List of newspapers in Oregon
