= OPlatz (Oranienplatz) Movement =

Pro-immigration protest movement

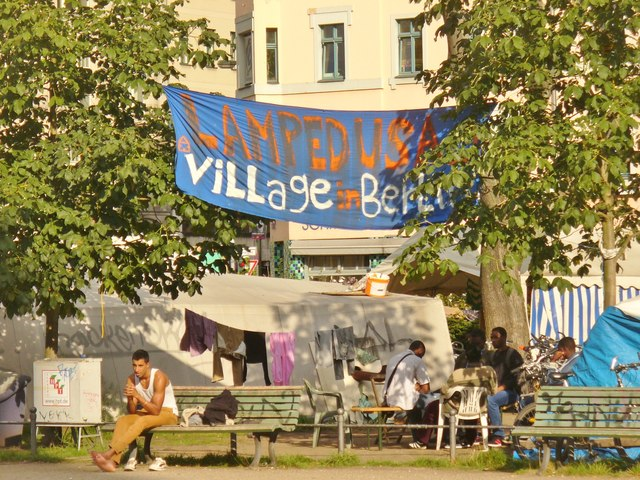
Berlin-Oranienplatz - Asyllager (Asylum Seekers' Camp) - geo.hlipp.de - 41463

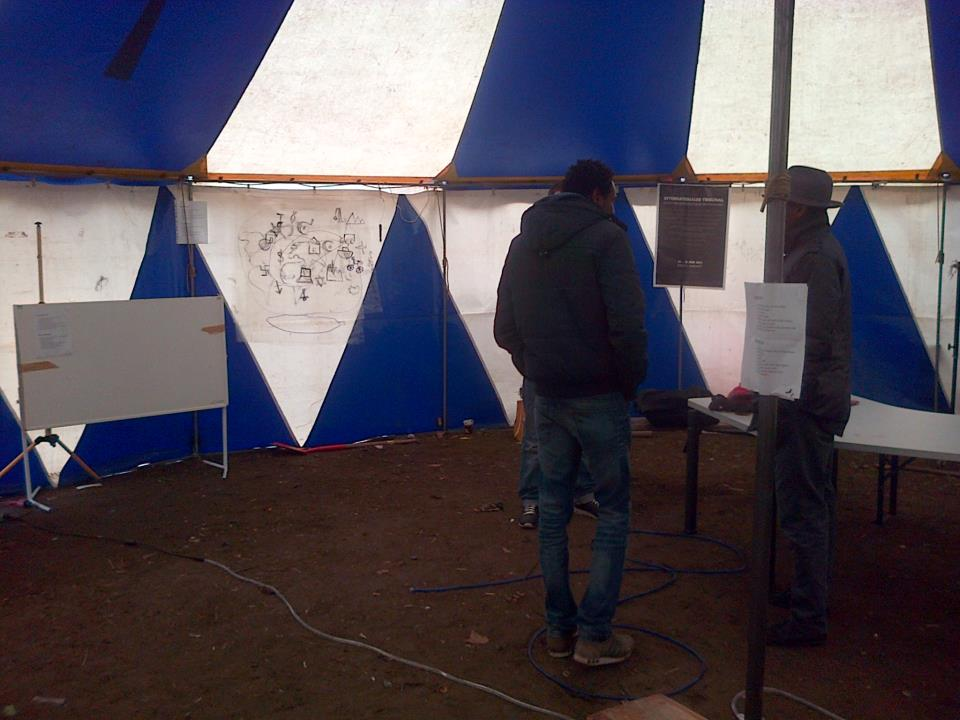
Meeting space at the centre of the occupied square

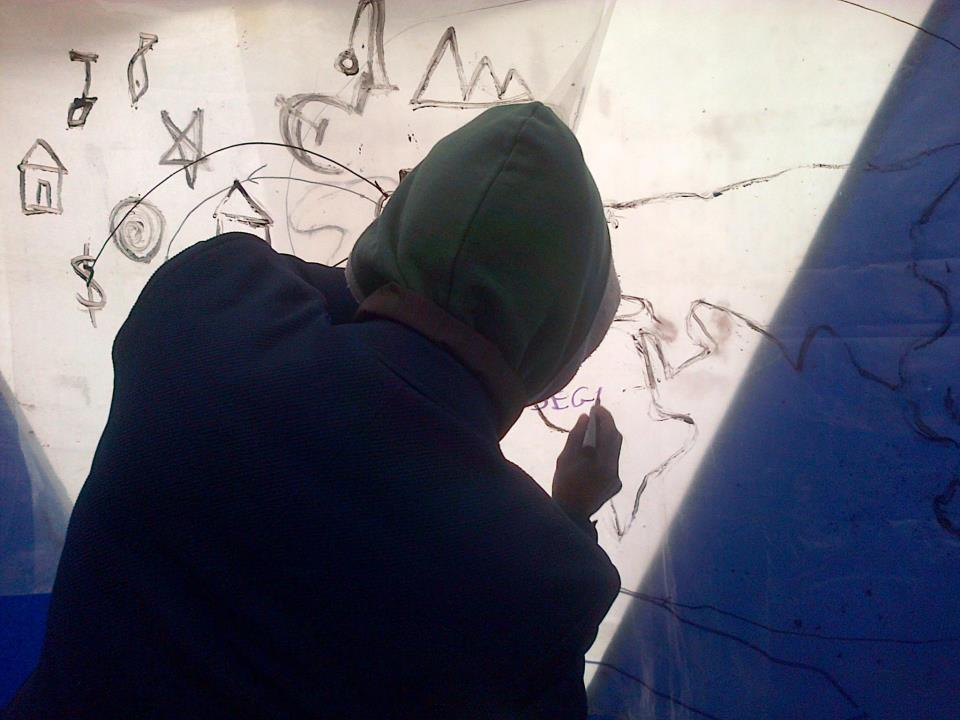
Collaborative situgraphy at the O-Platz

The "OPlatz" (Oranienplatz) movement was a pro-immigration protest movement that worked for an open-arms policy in the admission of migrants and refugees into Germany and in specific opposition to the third Dublin agreement, Residenzpflicht, "Lagers" or refugee camps and for the refugee’s right to work and study in Germany. From October 2012 to April 2014 the group maintained a protest encampment in the Oranienplatz plaza in Kreuzberg, Berlin. The "OPlatz" movement was composed mostly of African asylum applicants, who had come from camps all over Germany in an act of civil disobedience against theResidenzpflicht. Groups active in the organisation included Women In Exile, International Women Space and the Voice Refugee Forum. After the autonomous clearing of the camp in 2014 and in face of the rejection of most refugee applications, the group remains active and raises awareness for their cause through their webpage and information point at the Oranienplatz.

== Arrival in Berlin and early demonstrations in 2012 ==
After the suicide of Iranian refugee Mohammed Rahsapar in a refugee camp in Würzburg, numerous refugees in that camp came together and marched in protest towards Berlin in 2012. In about a month, they covered 600 km from Würzburg to Berlin, in which they had passed other "Lagers" where they invited others to join them. This march was intended to raise awareness against the Residenzpflicht, a legal requirement that lasts 6 months in Germany that prohibits the locational movement of applicants to refugee status (Asylbewerber) or that of those who have been granted the temporary permit to stay (Geduldete). Upon their arrival in Oktober of 2012 they set up camp in the Oranienplatz without requesting formal permission before. The district of Kreuzberg and its mayor, Franz Schulz (Green Party), temporarily allowed the occupation of the Oranienplatz.

On 24 October, a group of 40 refugees starts a hunger strike in front of the Brandenburger Tor. 2 days later, the police deprives the group of their sleeping pads and bags. The group continues their strike, but is forced on 2 November to abandon their cause. Shortly afterwards, on 8 November, the "OPlatz" movement and its members occupy the Gerhart-Hauptmann-Schule. Franz Schulz announced that the inhabitation of the School would be allowed for a few days. On 11 November, the district’s administration allows the refugees to temporarily stay in the school until the end of March 2013.

== Demonstrations in the following year ==
From 26 February to 20 March 2013, a "Refugee’s Revolution" bus toured 22 cities in Germany and attempted to unify similar movements and demonstrations on a national scale. On 23 March, about 1,000 protesters marched from the Oranienplatz into central Berlin. They called for a "Refugees' Revolution" and reminded Berliners that they were still there at the Oranienplatz. On 13 July, the refugee group protested against a nearby anti-refugee rally of the extreme-right party NPD. In the same month, the refugee camp came under scrutiny for allegations of rape; the police investigated these allegations, but they remain unproven.

On 9 August, Senator Frank Henkel (CDU) tried to circumvent the district council and have the camp cleared. He failed, but sparked a months-long continuous political discussion.

After the Lampedusa tragedy of 3 October 2013, in which 300 refugees died while crossing from Libya to the Italian island of Lampedusa, about 20 OPlatz protesters peacefully occupied the foyer of the European Commission in Berlin on 10 October. The protesters, some of whom had entered the EU through Lampedusa, brought candles to commemorate the dead and asked to speak with a government representative. The police allowed the protest to peacefully continue into the afternoon, after which the protesters moved onwards to an evening demonstration at the German chancellery. Also, on 9 October, 23 protesters restarted a hunger strike in front of the Brandenburger Tor. They preferred to define themselves using the English term "non-citizens" and struck until 19 October, after which they undertook to restart the strike in January 2014, had the political agenda regarding refugees not changed by then. During the 10-day hunger and thirst strike about 40 people were hospitalized, many of whom rejoined the strike immediately after treatment.

On 24 November, OPlatz representatives and local politicians reached an agreement for the refugees to move from the Oranienplatz to the Zum Guten Hirten retirement home in Berlin-Wedding. Additionally, an information point was to remain at Oranienplatz, to promote a new Asylpolitik. On the same day, after 80 refugees had moved into their new home, the police attempted to clear Oranienplatz of the remaining refugees. That evening over 600 people protested that the refugees should be allowed to stay since the retirement home was full. As the tents were still occupied, the police postponed the clearance. During the protests, the police made several arrests and used pepper sprays. Shortly afterwards, Senator Frank Henkel issued the ultimatum that the remaining refugees and tents would be cleared on 18 January 2014.

== 2014 and the clearance of the Oranienplatz ==
Just before the ultimatum's expiry, on 7 January, Berlin’s executive mayor Klaus Wowereit strove to find an alternative for the refugees. He cancelled the ultimatum and declared Berlin a city open to refugees, even in the face of the growing numbers, although he prohibited any more occupations.

On 18 March 2014, Senator Dilek Kolat presented a solution. Under the condition that the refugees left the Oranienplatz, the Senate would provide them with housing and German language education and would individually examine each and every one of their cases. Out of 467 people, the majority agreed to the terms. A minority group of 30 people with more complicated cases rejected the offer. Famous among them was Napuli Langa, a south Sudanese woman who in protest against the evacuation of Oranienplatz stayed up a tree for five days. In parallel with her protest, other refugees continued to hunger strike at the north end of the Oranienplatz, for several days after its clearance. By the ides of April the town square had been declared clear again.

The Gerhart-Hauptmann-Schule was still occupied. On 23 June, the Senate notified the inhabitants that other housing had been made available. 160 of the 200 residents were evacuated by 1,700 policemen, in an attempt to prevent reoccupation of the school. The remaining 40 refused to leave, and some occupied the roof, threatening to throw themselves off and to burn down the building if the school was forcefully intruded. After nine days, an agreement was reached that the refugees could stay as long as they did not allow any more to join them. In August 2016, the last 12 inhabitants received notice of eviction.

== Effectiveness and continuation of the OPlatz Movement ==
While many, if not all, of the refugee status applicants were rejected, the movement and its negotiation with the Berlin Senate continue to encourage refugees all around Europe during these difficult times for them. The movement contributed to the decision to shorten the Residenzpflicht's locational travel lock from 6 months to 3 months. On 1 July 2013, one of the Bundesländer, Thüringen, redefined the locational lock to be effective to the extent of its borders. Since then all other federal states in Germany, with the exception of Bavaria and Sachsen, have done the same.

In 2015, German chancellor Angela Merkel announced Germany’s support of Hungary given the refugee crisis and vowed to take over a million refugees in. This was a response to the significant influx of asylum applicants that Europe experienced due to the Syrian civil war.

The OPlatz movement continues to organise events and to speak out against the Residenzpflicht, while also advocating an alternative political agenda on asylum and the diversity of refugees, not only Syrians.

The refugee-run newspaper Daily Resistance which was set up at the O-Platz was still operating in 2016. Groups involved include the Voice Refugee Forum, Women in Exile and Street Roots.
