= Aulana L. Peters =

American lawyer

- Born: Aulana Louise Peters; November 30, 1941 (age 83); Shreveport, Louisiana, U.S.
- Education: College of New Rochelle; University of Southern California (JD)
- Occupation: Lawyer

Aulana Louise Peters (born November 30, 1941, in Shreveport, Louisiana) is a retired partner at the law firm of Gibson, Dunn & Crutcher LLP, where she was active partner from 1980 to 1984 and from 1988 to 2000.

From 1984 until 1988, she served as a commissioner of the Securities and Exchange Commission (SEC), and as a board member of the Public Interest Oversight Board. She was the first African American ever to serve as a commissioner of the SEC, and only the third woman ever to do so.

According to her resume at Forbes.com, she has served as a member of the International Public Interest Oversight Board since 2005, as a member of the Public Oversight Board of AICPA, a professional association for Certified Public Accountants in the United States, from 2001 to 2002, and sits on the boards of 3M, Deere & Company, Northrop Grumman and was on the board of Merrill Lynch.

== Education ==
Peters earned degree in philosophy from the College of New Rochelle in New York in 1963, and then earned a Juris Doctor from the University of Southern California in 1973.

== Career ==
Peters joined Gibson, Dunn & Crutcher in Los Angeles as an associate in 1973. She focused on commercial litigation, including class action suits and SEC enforcement actions. She became a partner in the firm in 1980, but resigned in 1984 to accept an appointment as the commissioner of the SEC under President Ronald Reagan. When Reagan's term ended, so did Peters', and she returned to Gibson, Dunn & Crutcher in 1988, where she remained until her retirement in 2000.

In 1999 she was elected to Northrop Grumman's board of directors. She served as a member of the Public Oversight Board of the American Institute of Certified Public Accountants in 2001 and 2002. She was elected to the Deere & Company board of directors in 2002, and her term ended in 2010. She was also appointed as a director at 3M. She was formerly a board member of Merrill Lynch and the public television station KCET,. She currently serves on the Accountability Advisory Council of the U.S. Comptroller General, and on the Market Regulatory Advisory Committee of the New York Stock Exchange. She has also served on Southern California Edison's Nuclear Decommissioning Trust Fund Committee for the past 10 years (two terms), and is currently under consideration for reappointment for another 5-year term.

Peters was appointed to the International Public Interest Oversight Board for Auditing, Education and Professional Ethics Standards in 2005 and held that role until 2012. She has also served on the United States Comptroller General’s Accountability Advisory Panel and on the Advisory Board to the Public Company Accountants Oversight Board.

In 2003, the Association of Securities and Exchange Commission Alumni named her the recipient of the William O. Douglas Award. In 2010, she was awarded the Medal of Honor by the American Institute of Certified Public Accountants for distinguished service by a non-accountant to the accounting profession.
