= City of Grants Pass v. Johnson =

US Supreme Court case on criminalizing public camping

- Supreme Court of the United States

Argued April 22, 2024 Decided June 28, 2024
- Full case name: City of Grants Pass, Oregon v. Gloria Johnson, et al., on Behalf of Themselves and All Others Similarly Situated
- Docket no.: 23-175
- Citations: 603 U.S. 520 (more)
- Argument: Oral argument
- Decision: Opinion

Case history
- Prior: Motion for class certification granted, 1:18-cv-01823-CL (D. Or. Aug. 7, 2019); Plaintiffs' motion for summary judgement granted in part and denied in part, 1:18-cv-01823-CL (D. Or. Jul. 22, 2020); Affirmed in part, vacated in part, and remanded, 50 F.4th 787 (9th Cir. 2022); Petition for rehearing en banc denied, 72 F.4th 868 (9th Cir. 2023)

Questions presented
- Does a local government's enforcement of a public camping ban against involuntarily homeless people violate the Eighth Amendment's protection against cruel and unusual punishment?

Holding
- The enforcement of generally applicable laws regulating camping on public property does not constitute “cruel and unusual punishment” prohibited by the Eighth Amendment.

Court membership
- Chief Justice John Roberts Associate Justices Clarence Thomas · Samuel Alito; Sonia Sotomayor · Elena Kagan; Neil Gorsuch · Brett Kavanaugh; Amy Coney Barrett · Ketanji Brown Jackson

Case opinions
- Majority: Gorsuch, joined by Roberts, Thomas, Alito, Kavanaugh, Barrett
- Concurrence: Thomas
- Dissent: Sotomayor, joined by Kagan, Jackson

Laws applied
- U.S. Const. amend VIII

City of Grants Pass v. Johnson, 603 U.S. 520 (2024), is a landmark decision of the United States Supreme Court in which the Court held that local government ordinances with civil and criminal penalties for camping on public land do not constitute cruel and unusual punishment of homeless people.

== Legal background ==
In the 1962 case Robinson v. California, the Supreme Court held that the Eighth Amendment prohibits criminalization of a status, as opposed to criminalizing criminal acts, in striking down a California law that criminalized being addicted to narcotics.

In the 1968 case Powell v. Texas, the Supreme Court held in a plurality opinion that an alcoholic can be prosecuted under a state statute against public intoxication because the "actus reus" (guilty act) of choosing to drink to the point of intoxication while in public is distinct from the status of being an alcoholic.

In the 2018 case Martin v. Boise, the Court of Appeals for the Ninth Circuit ruled that city officials in Boise, Idaho, could not enforce an anti-camping ordinance whenever its homeless population exceeds the number of available beds in its homeless shelters. Since the Supreme Court declined to hear an appeal to this case in 2019, it became binding precedent within the Ninth Circuit.

In Martin v. Boise, the Ninth Circuit cited the 1977 case Marks v. United States, which dictates that when there is no majority opinion, the narrowest decision reached between the plurality and concurring opinions becomes precedent. Thus, citing Justice Byron White's concurrence in Powell v. Texas upholding the conviction only because the defendant failed to prove that their alcoholism compelled them to violate the public intoxication statute, the Ninth Circuit held that Robinson v. California remains precedent in prohibiting the criminalization of one's status and associated unavoidable acts.

== Oregon District Court ruling ==
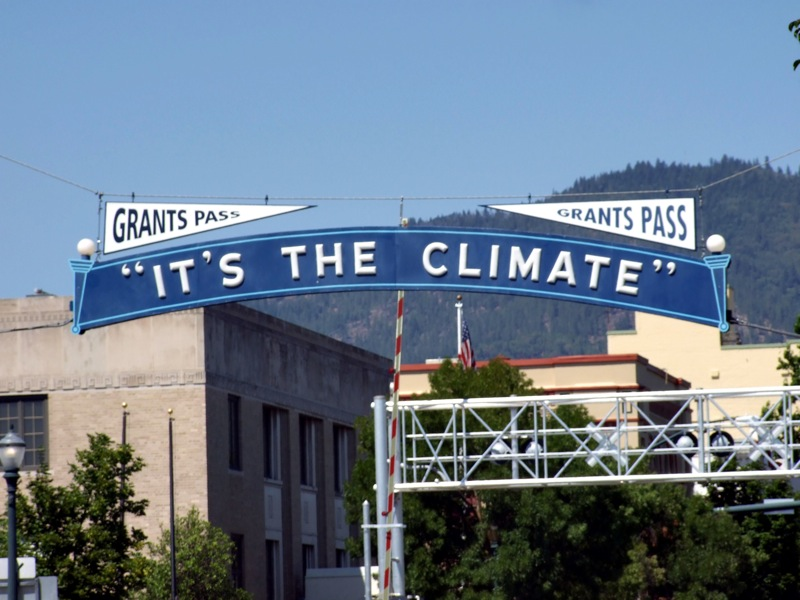
Grants Pass, Oregon, sought to impose anti-camping, anti-sleeping, and parking exclusion ordinances to dissuade homeless individuals from residing on its public land.

The Oregon Law Center, which supports low-income Oregonians, filed a class action lawsuit on behalf of Debra Blake (1959–2021) in the United States District Court for the District of Oregon in October 2018. At the time of filing, Blake had been homeless in Grants Pass, Oregon, between eight and ten years, occasionally entering temporary transitional housing. Grants Pass had levied civil fines against violators of anti-camping, anti-sleeping, and parking exclusion ordinances. The city imposed criminal penalties of trespassing on repeat violators who continued to reside on public land.

In August 2019, Magistrate Judge Mark D. Clarke granted the motion for class certification because the United Community Action Network's January 2019 point-in-time count identified at least 600 homeless people in Josephine County, Oregon, who are collectively affected by the city of Grants Pass's ability to enforce the ordinance. Clarke found Blake representative of this homeless population, and she was deemed capable of adequately representing their legal interests.

In July 2020, Clarke ruled that because Grants Pass lacked any homeless shelters that satisfy the United States Department of Housing and Urban Development's criteria, its anti-camping, anti-sleeping, and parking exclusion ordinances violated the Ninth Circuit's precedent in Martin v. Boise. Clarke recommended that Grants Pass pursue its public health interests through narrowly tailored restrictions on the time, place, and manner of sleeping on public land. Furthermore, Clarke held that these ordinances violated the Eighth Amendment's Excessive Fines Clause because homeless people unable to afford shelter are unlikely to be able to afford fines imposed for the unavoidable, life-sustaining act of sleeping.

At the time of filing, police officers could immediately issue a written order excluding a person from all parks in Grants Pass based on two or more alleged violations of these ordinances. Since the exclusion order was not stayed pending appeals, the District Court held that the city of Grants Pass's enforcement of the ordinances also violated the Due Process Clause because residents would be deprived of their liberty interest in visiting public parks during a potentially long appeals process.

During a March 2013 community meeting staged by the Grants Pass City Council, Council President Lily Morgan organized the brainstorming of anti-camping ordinances to "make it uncomfortable enough for homeless individuals in our city so they will want to move on down the road". The Oregon District Court cited this statement as evidence that the anti-camping ordinances were enacted to prosecute the status of being homeless, rather than uniformly prosecuting acts like parking vehicles on public land.

== Ninth Circuit ruling ==
After Blake died in 2021, Gloria Johnson and John Logan were assigned as the class representatives for subsequent appeals. At the time of filing, Johnson lived full-time in her van, and Logan usually slept in his car, parked at a rest stop. Since Johnson and Logan had been fined only under the anti-camping and parking exclusion ordinances, the anti-sleeping ordinance was excluded from the United States Court of Appeals for the Ninth Circuit's review.

In a September 2022 decision by Senior District Court Judge Roslyn O. Silver, the Ninth Circuit upheld the District Court's motion for class certification on the basis that involuntarily homeless people in Grants Pass satisfied the criteria of numerosity, commonality, typicality, and adequacy of representation. The Ninth Circuit rejected the city government's defense that its ordinances criminalized only the act of bringing camping items onto public land and not the necessary act of sleeping, because Grants Pass's cold temperatures necessitate the usage of blankets to prevent frostbite. Relying on its precedent in Martin v. Boise, the Ninth Circuit enjoined Grants Pass from enforcing its anti-camping ordinance against involuntarily homeless people. Circuit Court Judge Daniel P. Collins dissented from the ruling.

In June 2023, the Ninth Circuit denied a petition for an en banc rehearing by the entire Ninth Circuit, amending its opinion with a response to Judge Diarmuid O'Scannlain's arguments against the denial. O'Scannlain argued against creating a circuit split from the Eleventh Circuit's decision in Joel v. City of Orlando, 232 F.3d 1353 (11th Cir. 2000), which upheld an anti-camping ordinance by determining that homelessness is not a status. But Judges Silver and Ronald M. Gould argued that precedent did not apply because Orlando's homeless shelter never reached its maximum capacity.

== Supreme Court ruling ==
=== Petition for review ===
The city of Grants Pass filed a petition for a writ of certiorari on August 22, 2023, seeking review of the Ninth Circuit's ruling. In its wake, numerous city officials across the western U.S. filed amicus curiae briefs in favor of city officials, while homelessness advocacy groups filed opposing briefs in favor of Johnson and Logan –24 in all, the most amicus briefs filed in history. The Supreme Court granted the petition for review on January 12, 2024.

=== Oral arguments ===
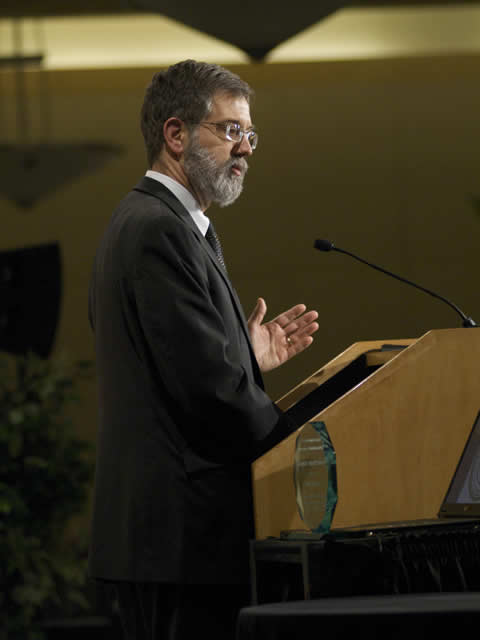
Edwin Kneedler argued the position of the federal government

During oral arguments on April 22, 2024, Theane Evangelis of the law firm Gibson, Dunn & Crutcher argued the case on behalf of Grants Pass. Evangelis asserted that homeless people should be forced to make a necessity defense in court rather than challenging the local government's ability to enforce anti-camping ordinances on Eighth Amendment grounds. Justice Elena Kagan criticized this reasoning based on evidence that the anti-camping ordinances were overwhelmingly applied to homeless people, rather than everyone who brought blankets onto the city's public land, suggesting criminalization of the status of being homeless.

Deputy Solicitor General Edwin Kneedler argued the case on behalf of the Biden administration. He argued that the Ninth Circuit should have evaluated each challenge to Grants Pass's enforcement of the anti-camping ordinances on a case-by-case basis, rather than granting a class action injunction whenever a city's homeless population exceeds the number of available beds in its homeless shelters. Since Rule 23 of the Federal Rules of Civil Procedure dictates that class action lawsuits are appropriate only when "there are questions of law or fact common to the class", Kneedler emphasized that individual determinations of involuntary homelessness are necessary.

Kelsi Brown Corkran, the Supreme Court Director of Georgetown Law School's Institute for Constitutional Advocacy and Protection, argued the case on behalf of Johnson and Logan. Corkran asserted that the anti-camping ordinance's imposition of a $295 fine, which rises to $537.60 if initially unpaid, lacks any rational basis beyond criminalizing the status of being homeless because the amount exceeds the average cost of rental housing in Grants Pass.

Corkran highlighted that the Supreme Court had routinely rejected local and state attempts to shift homeless populations elsewhere, citing Edwards v. California (striking down a ban on transporting low-income individuals into California based on the Dormant Commerce Clause), Saenz v. Roe (striking down a minimum residency requirement for receiving state welfare benefits based on the Privileges or Immunities Clause), and Papachristou v. City of Jacksonville (striking down an anti-vagrancy ordinance based on the vagueness doctrine of the Due Process Clause).

Chief Justice John Roberts and Justices Samuel Alito and Neil Gorsuch suggested that the Supreme Court should delegate homelessness policy to local governments because of the complexities in defining involuntary homelessness. Justices Clarence Thomas and Sonia Sotomayor noted that the case could be dismissed for a lack of standing because Johnson and Logan received only civil fines, not the criminal punishments imposed on repeat violators, so they cannot represent a claim under Robinson v. California, which dealt only with the criminalization of a status.

Justice Ketanji Brown Jackson claimed the case might also be dismissed for mootness because Section 195.530 of the Oregon Revised Statutes was enacted in 2023, dictating that "any city or county law that regulates the acts of sitting, lying, sleeping or keeping warm and dry outdoors on public property that is open to the public must be objectively reasonable as to time, place and manner with regards to persons experiencing homelessness", while offering an affirmative defense for violators to challenge the reasonableness of such ordinances.

=== Decision ===
==== Majority ====
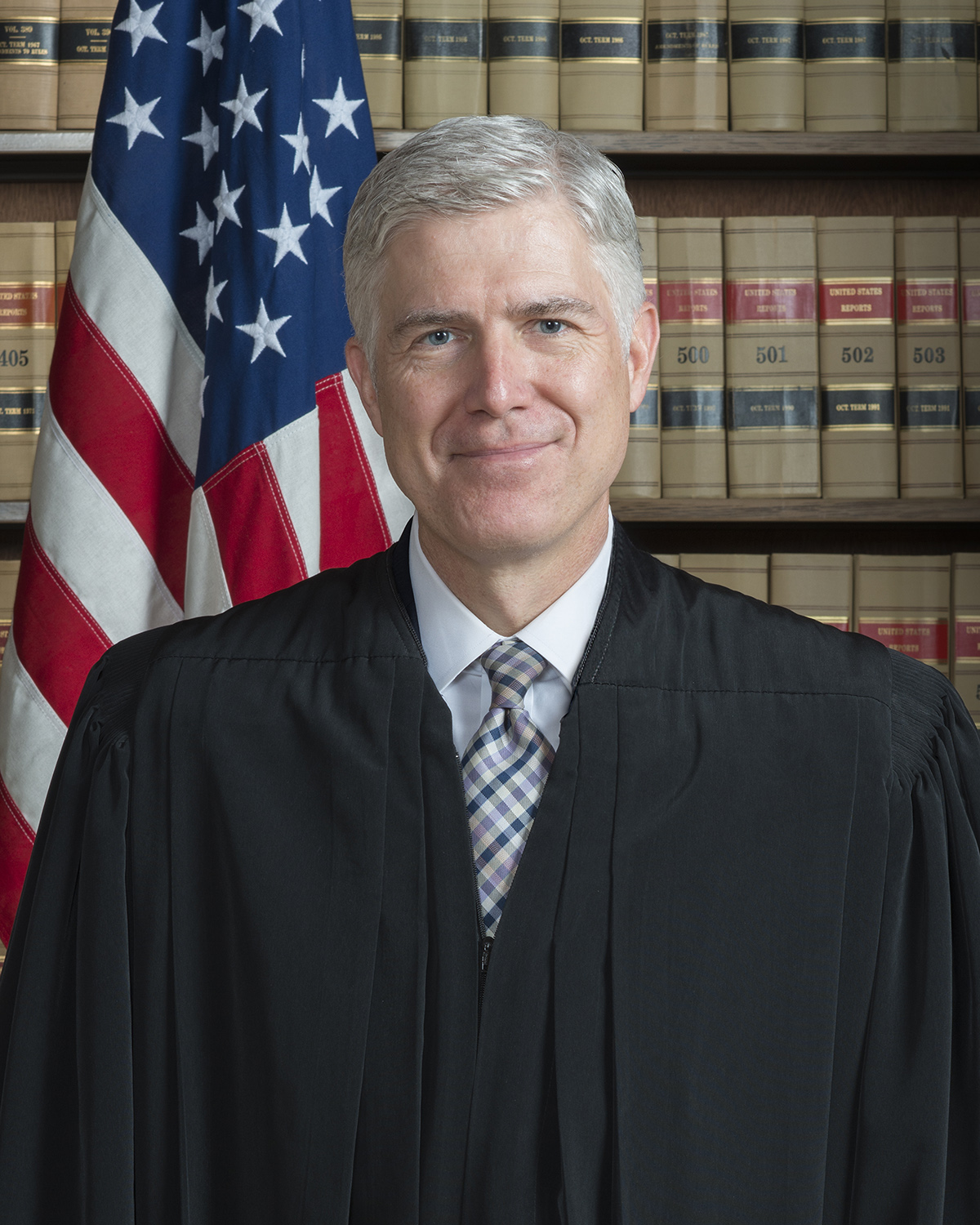
Justice Neil Gorsuch delivered the opinion of the Court

Gorsuch's majority opinion focuses on five points. First, the Eighth Amendment's prohibition on cruel and unusual punishment is interpreted to focus on the penalties that occurred after a criminal conviction. In this case, the punishments of fines, temporary bans from entering public property, and one-month jail sentences are viewed as neither cruel nor unusual. Second, while Robinson v. California prohibited criminalizing statuses, Grants Pass's anti-camping ordinances are interpreted as neutrally applied, regardless of one's housing status.

Third, citing how Powell v. Texas allows acts strongly associated with a status to be criminalized, the anti-camping statutes are upheld, despite the connection between homelessness and placing camping supplies on public land. The majority argues that a necessity defense would be more appropriate for homeless people to contest prosecution under these anti-camping ordinances if they had nowhere else to sleep.

Fourth, citing the 2020 case Kahler v. Kansas, in which the Supreme Court allowed states to not adopt the insanity defense, the majority argues that determinations of whether homeless defendants possess the "mens rea" (guilty mind) to criminally violate the anti-camping ordinances should be left to elected state and local government officials. Fifth, solutions to address rising homelessness in the U.S. are considered too complex to be addressed by unelected members of the federal judiciary.

==== Concurrence ====
Thomas's concurring opinion argues that an originalist interpretation of the Eighth Amendment's prohibition on cruel and unusual punishment would not provide any protections against status-based criminalization, advocating for the overturning of Robinson v. California. Furthermore, Thomas asserts that the plaintiffs could not challenge the anti-camping ordinance on Eighth Amendment grounds because they had not been criminally charged for repeated violations of the anti-camping ordinance, instead facing only civil penalties.

==== Dissent ====
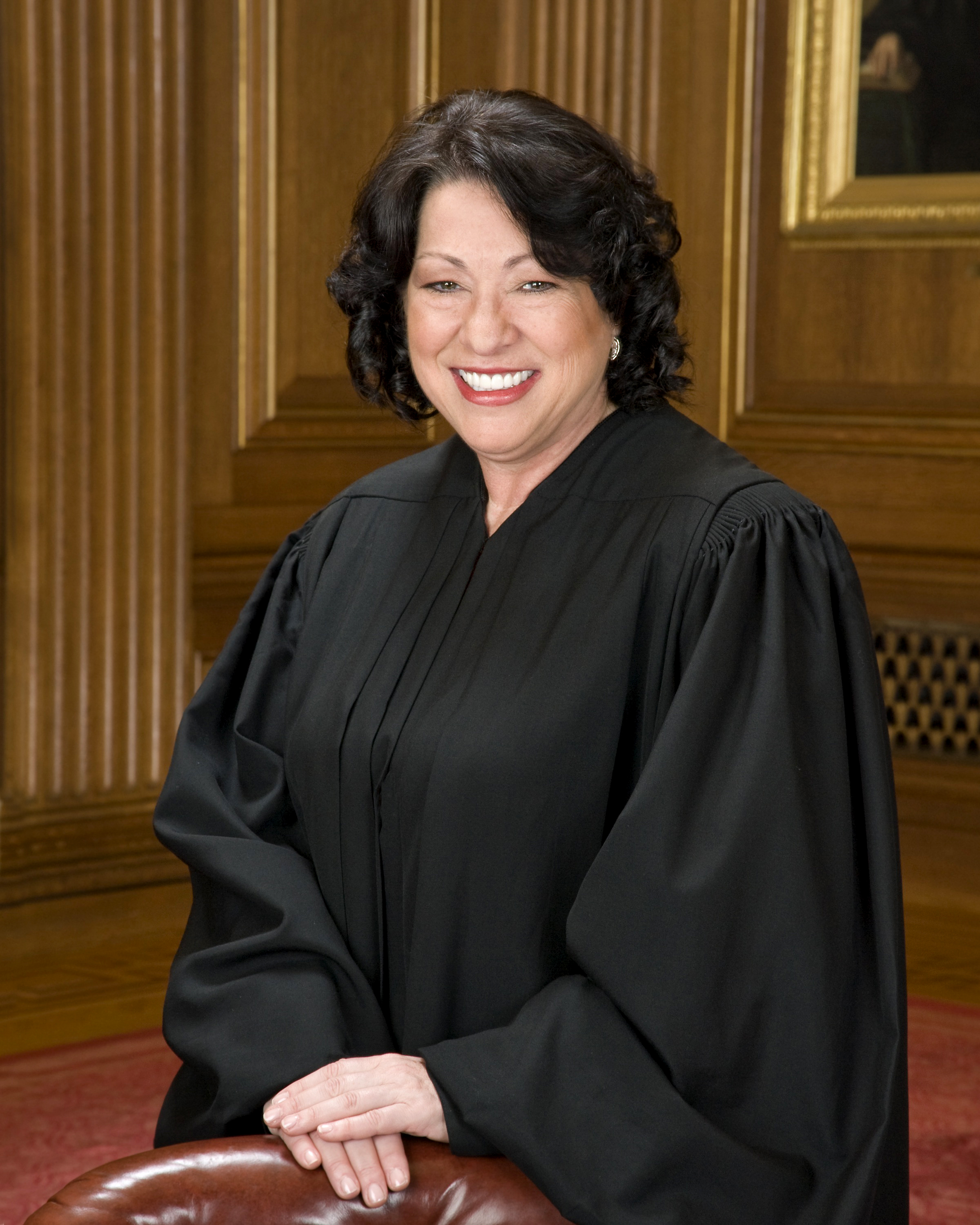
Justice Sonia Sotomayor authored the Court's dissenting opinion

Sotomayor's dissent argues that the facial neutrality of the anti-camping ordinance is irrelevant, given that it would effectively criminalize sleeping in the only location available to homeless people in Grants Pass. Furthermore, the ordinance defines campsites as locations where bedding is placed "for the purpose of maintaining a temporary place to live", clearly directing its application toward homeless people, as opposed to other visitors.

Noting that Oregon's state government prohibited anti-sleeping ordinances in 2023, the dissent contends that state and local governments need no further flexibility in criminalizing acts associated with homelessness. The dissent emphasizes that the lower court decisions already allowed state and local governments to adopt public health measures as long as they did not result in status-based criminalization of homelessness.

The dissent claims that Powell v. Texas was irrelevant in applying Robinson v. California because whereas an alcoholic's decision to drink to the point of public intoxication presents ambiguity in the extent of voluntary wrongdoing, all homeless people must sleep.

Criticizing the majority for prioritizing the arguments of state and local governments, the dissent asserts that criminalization of homelessness will ultimately limit the employment and housing opportunities available to homeless people. Citing the Grants Pass City Council's stated intentions in passing the anti-camping ordinance, the dissent notes that homeless people are more likely to move to other areas than stay to engage in a costly and complex necessity defense.

The dissent concludes by recognizing four remaining options for homeless people to contest the anti-camping ordinance. First, Oregon state law likely preempts Grants Pass's local ordinance, restraining the town's police from punishing the act of sleeping. Second, the majority's decision remands the case back to the Ninth Circuit to assess whether the ordinance's fines violate the Eighth Amendment's Excessive Fines Clause. Third, homeless people could challenge the ordinance under the Due Process Clause by citing Memorial Hospital v. Maricopa County (1974), which overturned a state law limiting non-emergency medical care based on the length of one's residency for impermissibly denying the basic necessities of life. Fourth, since Trop v. Dulles (1958) held that denaturalization as a punishment violates the Eighth Amendment, homeless defendants could argue that anti-camping ordinances that effectively banish them from their communities constitute a similarly cruel and unusual punishment.

== Impact ==
Originalist law professor Ilan Wurman praised the Supreme Court's decision and proposed using public nuisance lawsuits to compel state and local governments to clear homeless encampments if they present public health risks. While Wurman has previously succeeded in forcing Phoenix, Arizona, to close an encampment over its safety hazards, his lawsuits in Tucson, Arizona, and Salt Lake City, Utah, were dismissed for failing to prove that state and local governments are responsible for paying the costs of removing encampments.

UC Berkeley School of Law Dean Erwin Chemerinsky has noted that the decision does not require courts to accept public nuisance justifications for compelling state and local governments to clear homeless encampments. Chemerinsky has praised the Sacramento County Superior Court for dismissing Sacramento County District Attorney Thien Ho's public nuisance lawsuit because it threatens the government's separation of powers, while failing to address the underlying causes of homelessness.

Since 2022, the Missouri Attorney General has been empowered to sue local governments if they fail to enforce outdoor homeless camping bans. In March 2024, Florida enacted a similar law that also allows individuals and businesses to sue local governments if they do not enforce their anti-camping laws. While Florida's anti-camping law includes an exception during emergencies, the significant destruction Hurricanes Helene and Milton caused in 2024 prompted criticism that after states of emergency end, those displaced by natural disasters will be unfairly prosecuted.

In November 2024, Proposition 312, an Arizona ballot measure that allows people to apply for property tax refunds if their local government does not enforce its anti-camping ordinances, passed with 58% of the vote.

Los Angeles mayor Karen Bass criticized the ruling as unnecessary based on her prior success in moving homeless individuals into local motels and shelters. Bass argued that the decision "must not be used as an excuse for cities across the country to attempt to arrest their way out of this problem, or hide the homelessness crisis in neighboring cities or in jail.” In July 2024, the RAND Corporation found that three instances of dismantling homeless encampments in Los Angeles failed to reduce the city's homeless population.

By contrast, San Francisco mayor London Breed, Sacramento mayor Darrell Steinberg, and Lancaster mayor R. Rex Parris praised the ruling for allowing local politicians to control homeless encampments. In July 2024, California governor Gavin Newsom ordered the California Departments of Parks and Recreation and Fish and Wildlife to adopt the California Department of Transportation's model of clearing health and safety risks in homeless encampments, regardless of whether homeless shelters were available in surrounding areas. The National Homelessness Law Center warned that Newsom's actions were cruel and ineffective.

== See also ==
- Jones v. City of Los Angeles
