= Powell v. Texas =

1968 U.S. Supreme Court case on criminalizing public intoxication

- Supreme Court of the United States

Argued March 7, 1968 Decided June 17, 1968
- Full case name: Powell v. Texas
- Citations: 392 U.S. 514 (more) 88 S. Ct. 2145; 20 L. Ed. 2d 1254

Case history
- Prior: Appeal from the County Court at Law No. 1 of Travis County, Texas.

Holding
- A Texas law criminalizing public intoxication did not constitute cruel and unusual punishment.

Court membership
- Chief Justice Earl Warren Associate Justices Hugo Black · William O. Douglas; John M. Harlan II · William J. Brennan Jr. Potter Stewart · Byron White; Abe Fortas · Thurgood Marshall

Case opinions
- Plurality: Marshall, joined by Warren, Black, Harlan
- Concurrence: Black, joined by Harlan
- Concurrence: White (in result)
- Dissent: Fortas, joined by Douglas, Brennan, Stewart

Laws applied
- U.S. Const. amend. VIII

Powell v. Texas, 392 U.S. 514 (1968), was a United States Supreme Court case that ruled that a Texas statute criminalizing public intoxication did not violate the Eighth Amendment protection against cruel and unusual punishment. The 5–4 decision's plurality opinion was by Justice Thurgood Marshall. Justice Hugo Black and Byron White each wrote separate concurring opinions while Justice Abe Fortas dissented.

== Background ==
The defendant, Leroy Powell, worked in a tavern shining shoes for which he received approximately $12/week. Though Powell had a family, he provided no support to them but would use his paycheck to buy wine, which he drank daily and, about once a week, to the point of intoxication.

Powell was no stranger to the court system; "appellant had been convicted of public intoxication approximately 100 times since 1949, primarily in Travis County, Texas" (though he had a few convictions in neighboring Bastrop County, Texas). Each time, he would be fined $20 (for Travis County offenses) or $25 (for Bastrop County offenses); he would almost always have no means to pay the fine and was thus obliged to work off the fine in jail at the rate of $5/day.

In this specific case, Powell was arrested in Travis County in late December 1966 on yet another public intoxication charge. His case was heard before the Corporation Court of Austin, Texas (what the Austin municipal court was then called); Powell was once again found guilty and was once again fined $20. This time, though, his defense counsel appealed the conviction to the Travis County Court of Law No. 1 on the grounds that Powell could not be arrested for being an alcoholic. The County Court heard the case de novo and Powell was again found guilty and fined him $50. As no further appeals were available for Powell within the Texas judicial system, his counsel appealed to the United States Supreme Court.

== Opinion of the Court ==
=== Plurality opinion ===
Four members of the Court concluded that Powell, the defendant who was convicted of public intoxication, "was convicted, not for being a chronic alcoholic, but for being in public while drunk on a particular occasion." Therefore, the Texas statute was not criminalizing the condition of alcoholism alone, but instead punishing the defendant for his public behavior. The majority distinguished the case from the earlier case Robinson v. California (1962), which ruled that drug addiction alone as a disease could not be criminalized.

=== Concurring opinions ===
Justices Black and Harlan joined Marshall's plurality opinion. But in a separate concurrence, Justice Black (joined by Justice Harlan) expounded on the plurality's reasoning. He wrote that striking down public intoxication laws "would significantly limit the States in their efforts to deal with a widespread and important social problem and would do so by announcing a revolutionary doctrine of constitutional law that would also tightly restrict state power to deal with a wide variety of other harmful conduct."

Justice White did not join the plurality opinion (had he done so, that would have made it a majority opinion). Instead, he concurred only in its judgment affirming Powell's conviction. In his view, for Robinson to apply to this case, the Court would have to find not only that Powell was compelled to drink but also that he was compelled to be in public—an element of the crime. Yet Powell provided no evidence to support that conclusion. Indeed, Powell "had a home," and "[f]or all we know from this record, [he] at the time knew precisely where he was, retained the power to stay off or leave the streets, and simply preferred to be there rather than elsewhere." The absence of such evidence precluded Powell's claim—regardless of whether his claim would otherwise have succeeded. Thus, White concluded, it was unnecessary for the Court to opine further on the legal questions presented in the case (as the plurality had done).

=== Dissenting opinion ===
Justice Fortas, writing for the dissent, argued that chronic alcoholism was a disease and was no different than the case in Robinson, which involved narcotic addiction. Therefore, regardless of where the intoxication took place, Powell should not have been convicted.

== See also ==
- List of United States Supreme Court cases, volume 392
- List of United States Supreme Court cases
- Lists of United States Supreme Court cases by volume
