= Jena Forest =

Forest in Thuringia

Jena Forest Jenaer Forst
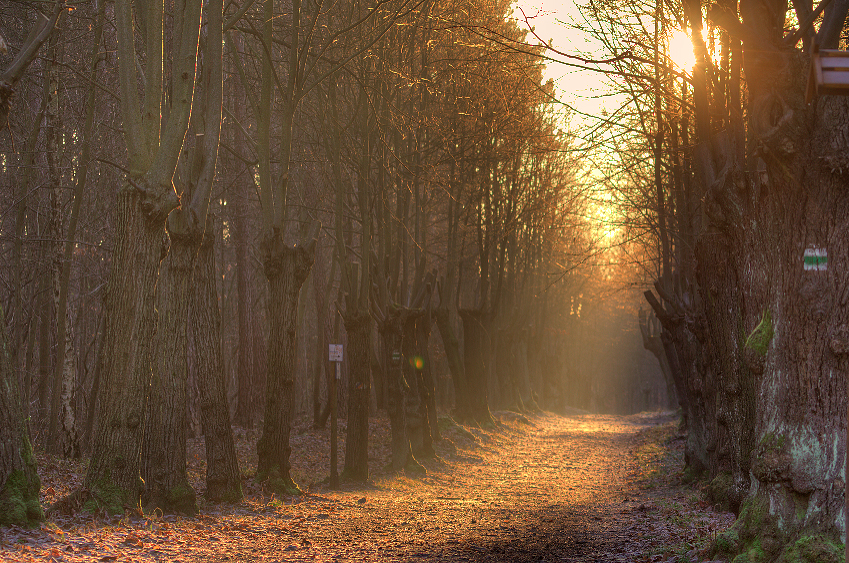
- Allee Bismarckturm, Jena
- Interactive map of Jena Forest

Geography
- Coordinates: 50.911°N 11.534°E
- Area: 2,500 hectares (6,200 acres)

Administration
- Authority: Jena Municipal Service

Jena Forest (German: Jenaer Forst) is an urban forest located, in Jena, Thuringia, Germany. It is managed by Kommunalservice Jena (Jena Municipal Service). The forest is 2,500 hectares (6,200 acres) in extent.
