= Paul Ceglia =

American fugitive businessman (born 1973)

- Born: Paul D. Ceglia; July 22, 1973 (age 53); Wellsville, New York

Paul D. Ceglia /ˈsɛɡliə/ (born July 22, 1973) is an American fugitive. He is the founder of businesses such as Greensprings Natural Cemetery, StreetFax, PageBook, and Allegany Pellets. In 2010, Ceglia brought a lawsuit against Facebook, Inc., claiming ownership of 84% of the company. The judge dismissed Ceglia's claim as fraudulent. Ceglia and his family were found to have vanished on May 1, 2015 after he cut off a GPS tracker. In 2018 he was arrested in Ecuador, where he remains after that country denied the U.S. Justice Department's extradition request.

== Biography ==
Ceglia was born in Wellsville, New York to an Italian-American father, Carmine Ceglia, and an Irish mother. He moved around after high school, spending two years teaching at an alternative school in Taos, New Mexico and opened an ice cream stand in New York. Ceglia claims he bought and sold real estate, built and renovated homes in Wellsville and the Bahamas, helped start an eco-friendly cemetery in Ithaca, New York, and was a founding member of the local Green Party. Ceglia and his wife have also supported a school called Calix Academy in Kibera, a slum of Nairobi. They built a bakery to help the school make an income, as well as functional toilets and classrooms and, financially supported the education of orphans there. He told Businessweek: "I like to think about myself as someone that is driven by trying to contribute in some way to increasing the consciousness on the planet", which he also states on his Facebook page.

Ceglia has three sons and one daughter, with his wife, Iasia. His third son was born in Ecuador while he was a fugitive.

== Paul Ceglia vs. Mark Zuckerberg ==
Ceglia met future Facebook CEO Mark Zuckerberg in 2003, when Ceglia posted a Craigslist advertisement seeking help with his website StreetFax.

On June 30, 2010, Ceglia filed a lawsuit against Zuckerberg, claiming 84% ownership of Facebook and seeking monetary damages. According to Ceglia, he and Zuckerberg (then an undergraduate at Harvard) entered an agreement on April 28, 2003, with a fee of $1,000 which entitled Ceglia to 50 percent of the website's revenue, as well as an additional 1 percent interest in the business per day after January 1, 2004 (if Zuckerberg was tardy in deploying the site), until the website was completed. The purported contract obligated Ceglia to pay Zuckerberg $1,000 for StreetFax and $1,000 for another project called PageBook. The contract also mentioned an expanded project called The Face Book to be completed by January 2004, charging an additional 1% interest in the business owed to Ceglia for each day the website is delayed from that date. Ceglia proffered a $1,000 receipt from his checkbook, dated six months after the contract, as evidence that he paid Zuckerberg for his work.

Zuckerberg admitted to having worked with Ceglia on StreetFax.com, but claimed that Facebook was an entirely separate idea that had no relation to Ceglia. Ceglia and his lawyers have claimed that Facebook planted a fake document on his computer to incriminate him. The evidence presented by Ceglia was determined to be fabricated.

=== Legal counsel in Facebook case ===
In court, Ceglia was represented by Paul Argentieri (his longtime counsel); Jeffrey Lake, a San Diego attorney, represented him on an interim basis after the law firms of Lippes Mathias Wexler Friedman, Connors & Vilardo, and DLA Piper all fired their client and left the case.

Lippes Mathias Wexler Friedman withdrew as counsel in early 2011, when their own analysis concluded that the contract Ceglia was using as evidence had been forged. On June 29, 2011, DLA Piper withdrew from the case, and Ceglia retained Jeffrey Lake. On October 18, 2011, Lake also withdrew from the case. Lake did not give a reason for his withdrawal.

In October 2014, Facebook filed a lawsuit in New York Supreme Court against DLA Piper, Milberg LLP and Lippes Mathias Wexler Friedman for malicious prosecution, claiming that these firms should have known that Ceglia's case was based on forged documents. The case was dismissed in December 2015.

=== Arrest and escape to Ecuador ===
On October 26, 2012, federal agents arrested Ceglia and charged him with fabricating evidence in relation to his suit against Zuckerberg. In March 2015, authorities discovered that Ceglia had removed his GPS tracking device and issued a warrant for his arrest. Law enforcement officials expressed concern that Ceglia was out of the country. Ceglia's mother, father, and brother lost the $250,000 they put up for Ceglia's bond.

Ceglia was later found in Ecuador and arrested by local authorities on August 23, 2018. Though Ecuador's National Court of Justice ordered him returned to the U.S. to face the criminal charges, President Lenin Moreno reversed the extradition order and Ceglia was freed from Ecuadorian custody in June 2019. Moreno concluded that Ceglia's third son—who was born in Ecuador in April 2018—was subject to court-ordered child support, thus prohibiting Ceglia from leaving the country in the "best interest" of the child.

As of 2021, Ceglia remains in Ecuador and is expected to seek asylum and citizenship there.

== Prior Criminal Record ==
=== Allegany Pellets LLC ===
Ceglia and his wife Iasia (née McCarthy) were owners of Allegany Pellets LLC and were charged with one count of first-degree scheme to defraud and 12 counts of fourth-degree grand larceny in November 2009. In December 2009, the then-Attorney General of New York (later Governor) Andrew Cuomo announced a temporary restraining order banning Ceglia from taking advance payments from consumers, destroying any business records or property, or transferring any assets. Cuomo stated in a press release that the company, had "lied to customers and solicited new orders" even when it could not "deliver products as promised". The charges were eventually dropped as every customer was either refunded or received wood pellets.
