= Martin v. City of Boise =

2018 court case

Martin v. Boise
- Court: United States Court of Appeals for the Ninth Circuit
- Full case name: Robert Martin, Lawrence Lee Smith, Robert Anderson, Janet F. Bell, Pamela S. Hawkes, and Basil E. Humphrey v. City of Boise
- Decided: September 14, 2018

Court membership
- Judges sitting: Marsha S. Berzon, Paul J. Watford, and John B. Owens

Case opinions
- Decision by: Marsha S. Berzon
- Concur/dissent: John B. Owens

Laws applied
- U.S. Const. amend. VIII; Boise City Code §§ 9-10-02 and 6-01-05
- Abrogated by
- City of Grants Pass v. Johnson (2024)

Martin v. Boise (full case name Robert Martin, Lawrence Lee Smith, Robert Anderson, Janet F. Bell, Pamela S. Hawkes, and Basil E. Humphrey v. City of Boise) was a 2018 decision by the U.S. Court of Appeals for the Ninth Circuit regarding anti-camping ordinances targeting homeless people, effectively overturned by the U.S. Supreme Court in 2024.

The decision was in response to a 2009 lawsuit by six homeless plaintiffs against the city of Boise, Idaho regarding the city's anti-camping ordinance. The ruling held that cities cannot enforce anti-camping ordinances if they do not have enough homeless shelter beds available for their homeless population. It did not necessarily mean a city cannot enforce any restrictions on camping on public property.

The decision was based on the Eighth Amendment to the U.S. Constitution's prohibition on cruel and unusual punishment.

In 2019, the U.S. Supreme Court declined to hear an appeal of the case, leaving the precedent intact in the nine Western states under the jurisdiction of the Ninth Circuit (Alaska, Arizona, California, Hawaii, Idaho, Montana, Nevada, Oregon, and Washington), but in 2024, the Supreme Court effectively overturned Martin v. Boise in its City of Grants Pass v. Johnson decision denying the extension of cruel and unusual punishment to anti-camping ordinances.

== History ==
In 2009, after a local homeless shelter in Boise closed, six people were cited for violations of a city ordinance that made it illegal to sleep on public property. Homeless plaintiffs represented by Howard Belodoff filed a lawsuit challenging the constitutionality of anti-camping ordinance that punish homeless individuals that cannot sleep elsewhere.

The Ninth Circuit Court of Appeals' decision striking down anti-camping ordinances when applied to homeless individuals still allowed state and local governments to enact time, place, and manner restrictions on the population's ability to camp on public land.

In 2021, the city settled the lawsuit by agreeing to spend $1.3 million for additional shelter spaces, compensate $435,000 for the plaintiffs' attorneys fees, amend ordinances on public sleeping, and train police officers not to arrest homeless individuals whenever local shelters are full. People who are offered appropriate available shelter space, but refuse to go could still be cited, under the settlement.

In 2024, the Supreme Court effectively overturned Martin v. Boise in its City of Grants Pass v. Johnson decision denying the extension of cruel and unusual punishment to anti-camping ordinances. The court held that a city's enforcement of generally applicable laws regulating camping on public property did not violate the Eighth Amendment's Cruel and Unusual Punishment Clause. In doing so, the court found these concerns were better addressed through community-based policy making decisions. The court went even further to state that the question of what type of behavior may be criminalized is not addressed by the Eighth Amendment, and that this question may be left to other constitutional provisions. The court also refused to extend Robinson v. California to this case, narrowing the holding in the case to pure "status crimes". Therefore, the court stated that the laws such as the Boise ordinances, do not criminalize a status, but rather make certain actions a crime. Therefore, Martin was effectively overruled.
