= Oranienplatz =

Square in Berlin, Germany

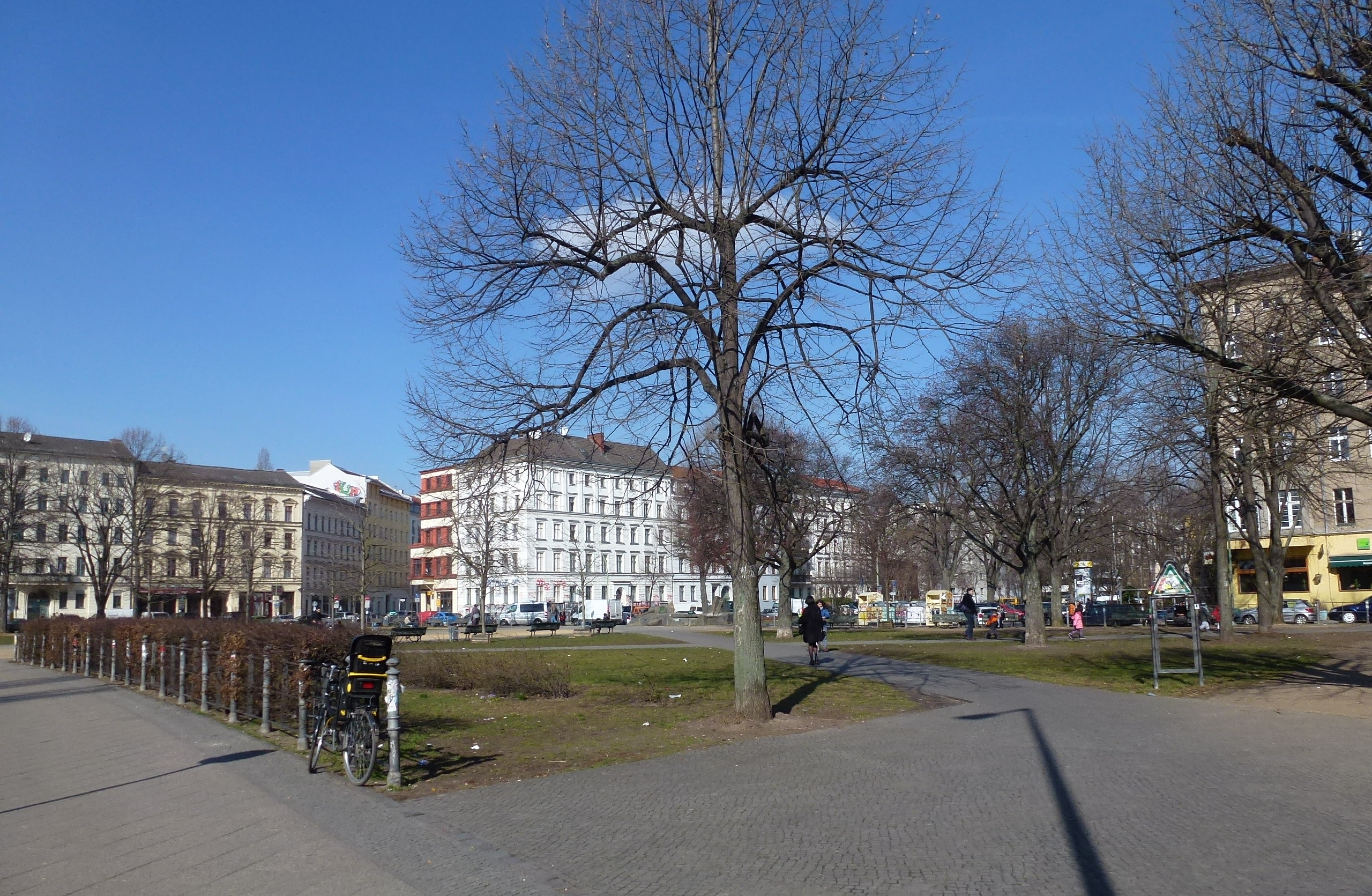
- The square in 2016
- Interactive map of Oranienplatz
- Type: Square
- Location: Kreuzberg, Berlin, Germany
- Coordinates: 52.5022°N 13.4158°E

Oranienplatz is a square in Kreuzberg, Berlin, Germany.

From 2012 until 2014 it was the site of the OPlatz (Oranienplatz) Movement pro-immigration protest encampment. In 2025, another protest was held there in reference to the previous one. Other protests also regularly occur in the area. The website oplatz.net lists over 1,500 protests (some being duplicates, in English, German and Turkish of one another) dating back to 2012.
