= Glock switch =

Auto sear installable on a Glock

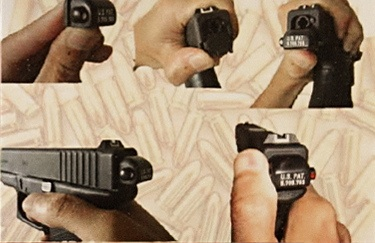
A switch attached to a Glock pistol

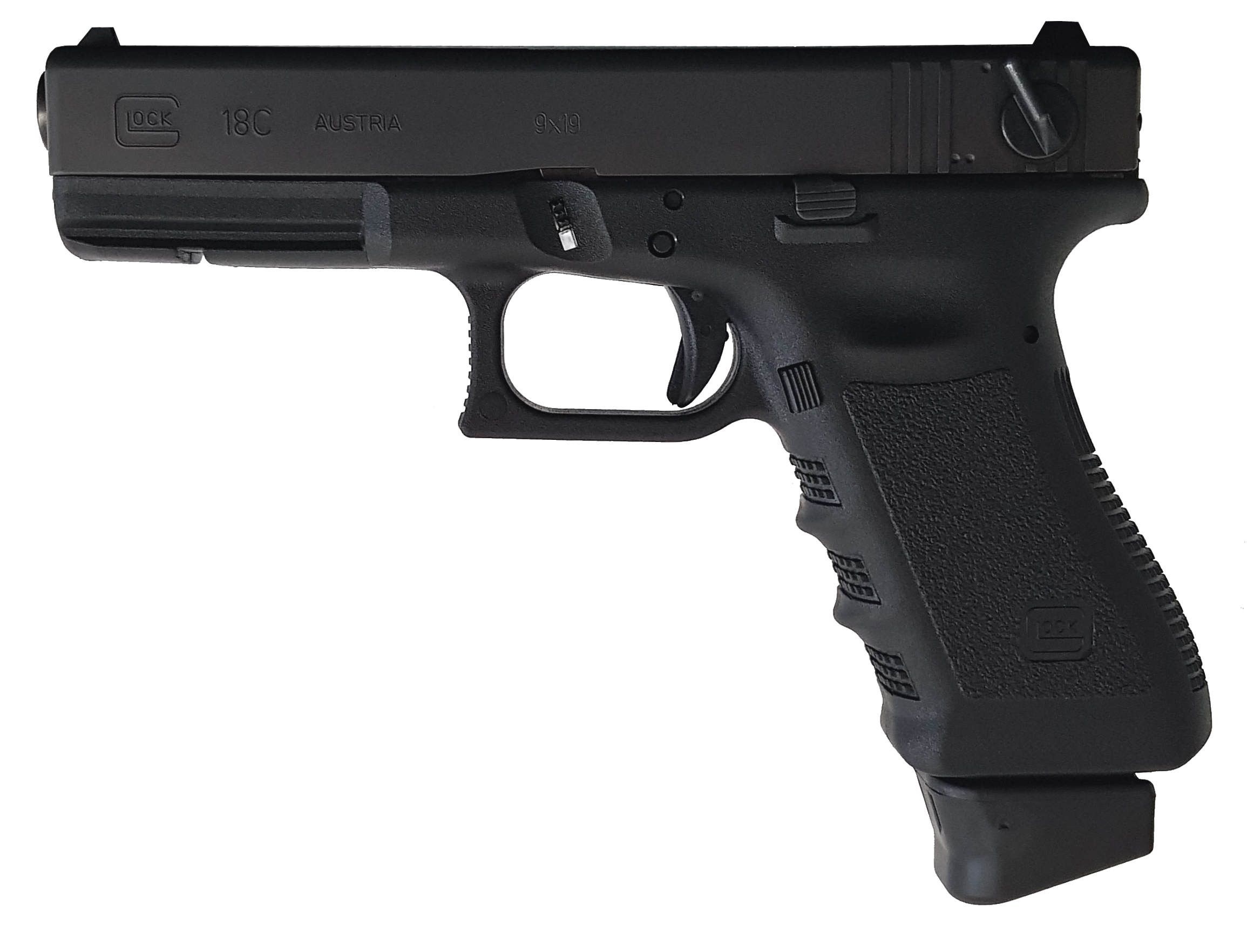
A Glock 18 for reference, denoted by the slide-mounted fire selector

A Glock switch is a small device that can be attached to the rear of the slide of a Glock handgun, changing the semi-automatic pistol into a machine pistol capable of fully automatic fire. Glock does not manufacture switches to be attached to their firearms, nor do they design their firearms with the intent of having machine gun conversion devices installed. They are aftermarket parts manufactured and sold illegally through the black market.

As a type of auto sear, it functions by applying force to the trigger bar to prevent it from limiting fire to one round of ammunition per trigger pull. This device by itself, regardless of whether it is installed on a slide or not, is classified by the Bureau of Alcohol, Tobacco, Firearms and Explosives (ATF) as a machine gun, making possession of the device illegal in the United States under most circumstances.

For reference, Glock's law enforcement & military Model 18 machine pistol has a built-in select fire function. This allows the pistol to fire at approximately 1,200 rounds per minute, meaning it could empty a standard capacity 17 or extended 33 round magazine in 0.85 or 1.65 seconds respectively.

== Operation ==
A Glock switch functions by applying force to a semi-automatic pistol's trigger bar (disconnector) to prevent it from limiting fire to one round of ammunition per trigger pull. Normally, in a semi-automatic pistol, after firing, the trigger bar catches the firing pin until the trigger is released, but when depressed by the switch it does not catch. A Glock switch thus converts the weapon into a machine pistol capable of automatic fire. The device is roughly the size of a United States quarter, and when installed on the rear of the slide on a Glock pistol (replacing the slide cover plate), adds a selective fire switch; flipping the switch sets the weapon to fully automatic mode, which is capable of firing as many rounds per minute as the short-recoil action allows.

== History ==
A patent for the Glock auto-sear was filed in 1996 and approved in 1998, with its invention credited to Venezuelan Jorge A. Leon, who claims to have invented the device in 1987. In 2024, Leon stated that he regrets inventing the device.

The first reported appearance of Glock switches in the United States occurred in 2002 when an Argentinian was arrested for sending Glock switches among other illegal firearms to the United States, with 16 later being recovered by the ATF in 2003.

In 2019, the ATF recovered thousands of the devices which were imported from China. Since 2021, people have been manufacturing the switch devices with 3D printers. In March 2022, a Vice News investigation learned that the federal prosecutions which involved conversion devices have been rising since 2017. They determined that from 2017 to 2022, advances in low-cost 3D printers and global commerce on the internet have made the devices available for as little as US$20. In 2022, federal authorities documented a dramatic rise in the prevalence of the Glock switches.

In response to proliferation of Glock switches, Glock plans to replace the discontinued models in December 2025 with "V" designations after the model numbers, which will feature redesigned trigger bars and rear plates designed to prevent the use of full-auto switches. However, Glock's attempt was foiled when reports show that new Glock switches are compatible with "V" series models.

Colloquially, an auto sear is sometimes referred to as a "giggle switch".

== Legality ==
=== United States ===
A handgun with a Glock switch attached fits the definition of a machine gun under United States federal law, per the ATF: "A Glock Switch is a part which was designed and intended for use in converting a semi-automatic Glock pistol into a machine gun; therefore, it is a 'legal machine gun' as defined in 26 U.S.C. 5845(b)." These devices are therefore illegal for civilians to possess under federal law.

== See also ==
=== Similar devices ===
- Heckler & Koch VP70, polymer-framed pistol with a similar device (auto stock)

=== Incidents involving Glock switches ===
- 2022 Memphis shootings
- September 2024 Birmingham shooting
- Tuskegee University shooting

=== In general ===
- Bump stock
- Hell-fire trigger
- Gun politics in the United States
