= Walther Model 4 =

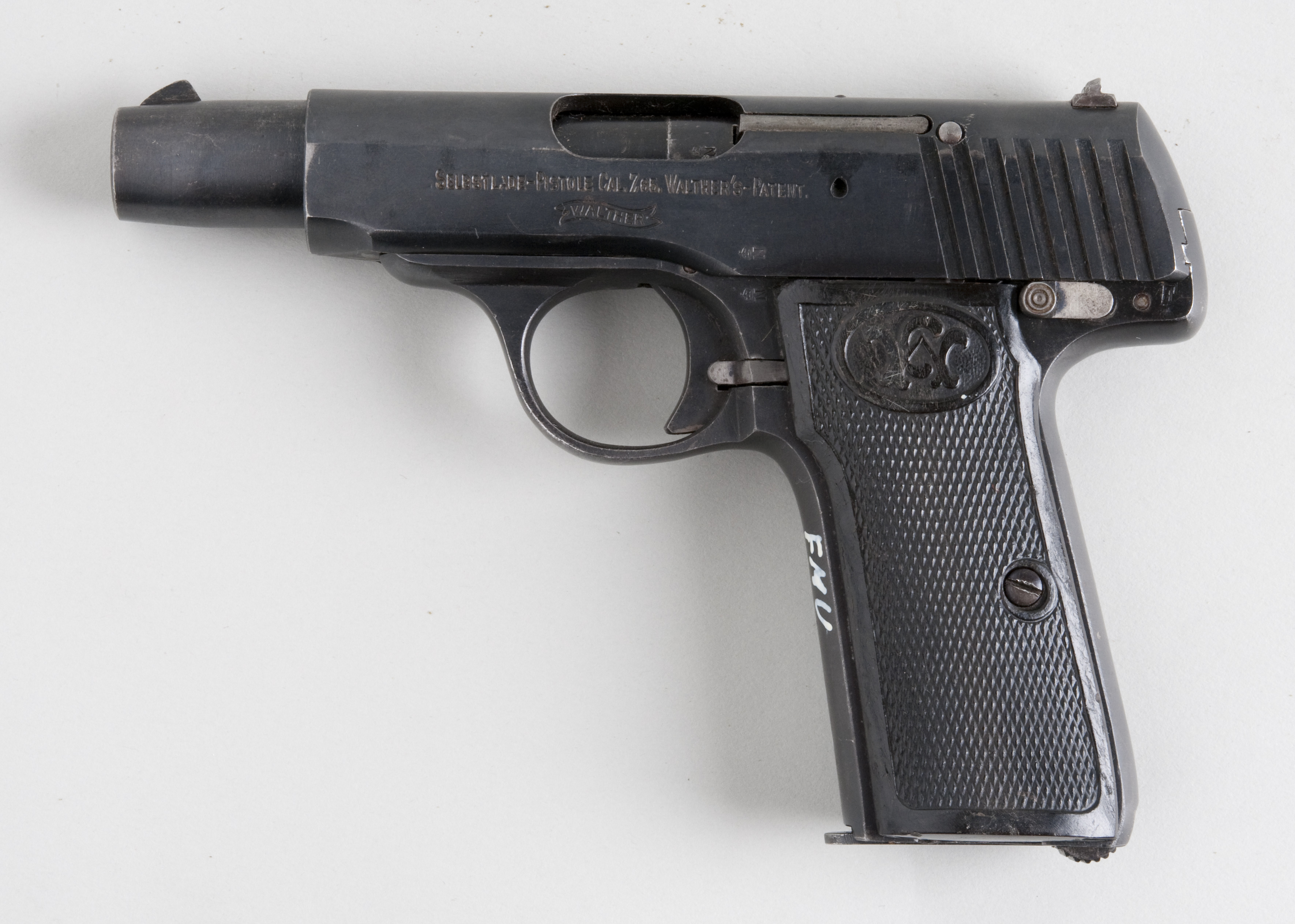
- Display of the Walther Model 4
- Type: Blowback handgun
- Place of origin: German Empire

Service history
- Used by: German Empire; Weimar Republic
- Wars: World War I

Specifications
- Length: 6 inch / 153mm
- Height: 3.91 inch / 99.4mm

The Walther Model 4 is a .32 ACP blowback fixed barrel handgun utilized primarily by the Imperial German Army during WWI, and additional utilizations and production during interbellum. It was produced in four upgrade variations known as the Type 1, 2, 3 and 4, based primarily from the German patent 256606 covering the assembly and disassembly under specific conditions.

Initial Model 4 variations included frontier recoil spring mechanisms, safety level mechanisms, and groove sights through the Type 1 (or Model 3/4 as of its correlation with the Model 3), before later omissions established the Type 2.

The Model 4 was equipped with an internal hammer and additional bayonet-lock retained recoil spring encasing the barrel assembly, with size specifications of 5.94" length. It was popularized for both primarily German military and civilian utilizations, however was equipped with a particularly impractical safety mechanism and one-handed utilizations.

== Background ==
=== Predecessor prototypes and firearms ===
Initial predecessor firearms to the Model 4 included prototypes of a .32 and .25 caliber handguns, to which the .25 caliber prototype would presumably contribute to the first .25 caliber Walther handgun, which would later be provided with the name of the Walther Model 1, a more minuscule and lighter variation of the 1906 FN Browning handgun.

=== Initial handgun design ===
The initial handgun design of the Walther Model 4 would become the Type 1 (or Model 3/4), with retained mechanisms from the Model 3. The characteristics of the initial model would include a groove sight and a safety mechanism. Additionally, the Model 4 was highly simplistic, which aided the Imperial German Army in weapons training.

=== Interbellum production ===
During interbellum, Model 4s would continue production, ceased in 1929 following the introduction of the Walther PP. During production, the Model 4 would undergo modifications made with type variations.

== Type 1 ==
The Walther Model 4, Type 1 (or Model 3/4), included a retained release frontier recoil spring bushing from the Model 3, and included the following design characteristics:

=== Type 1 characteristics ===
1. Rounded top slide
2. Squared off lower front edge
3. Dual circular groove safety mechanism
4. Partially exposed trigger-bar left of receiver
5. Groove sight
6. Triangular/ramped frontier sight
7. Oval ejection port

== Type 2 (Late commercial and early conflict) ==
The Walther Model 4, Type 2 included an omitted frontier bushing, and newer frontier bushing bayonet-styled mount, and included the following design characteristics:

=== Type 2 (Late commercial and early conflict) characteristics ===
1. Lower front edge of slide rounded
2. 7 angled square-cut slide serrations
3. Circular-groove safety mechanism
4. Left side trigger bar partially exposed
5. Slide 1/4 inch longer than predecessor
6. Top groove sight
7. Triangular front sight
8. Oval ejection port

== Type 2 (Wartime and postbellum production) ==
The Walther Model 4, Type 2's wartime and postbellum productions included slight modifications, with the following design characteristics:

=== Type 2 (Wartime and postbellum production) characteristics ===
1. Gradual incorporation of drift-adjustable rear sight
2. Oval ejection port

== Type 3 ==
The Walther Model 4, Type 3 was a postbellum handgun production type including increased triangular-cut slide serrations and checkered safety mechanisms, with the following design characteristics:

=== Type 3 characteristics ===
1. 16 fine triangular-cut forward-angled slide serrations
2. Checkered safety mechanisms
3. Internal trigger bar
4. Raised adjustable drifting rear sight
5. Oval ejection port

== Type 4 ==
The Walther Model 4, Type 4 was another postbellum handgun production type including the following characteristics:

=== Type 4 characteristics ===
1. Rectangular ejection port
2. Checkered safety mechanism

== Specifications ==
1. 7.62mm / .32 ACP
2. 8 round capacity
3. 5.94 inch / 151mm length
4. 4.05 inch / 102.9mm height
5. 1.62 inch / 41.2mm grip depth at base
6. 3.46 / 88mm barrel length
7. .8 inch / 20.5mm slide width
8. 18.42 ounce / 521.2g weight empty
