= Trigger bar =

Component of a firearm action

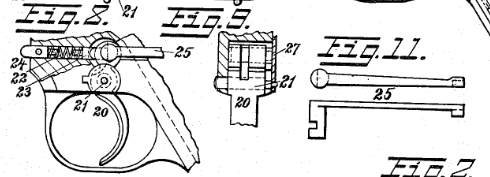
Drawings showing the trigger-bar (part no. 25) of a Browning automatic pistol from US patent no. 1,276,716 granted to John M. Browning

In a firearm action, the trigger bar is a flat metal piece that is used in some designs as a linkage between the trigger and the sear. The pressure ("pull") on the trigger through the bar causes a movement of the sear that releases the shot. Most modern semi-automatic pistols use the trigger bar in their actions due to the need for the trigger-sear linkage to go around the magazine.

The early small arms with matchlock used a long bar instead of a trigger. This bar is also known in the literature as a trigger bar. It was replaced by a short trigger resembling the modern one in the end of the 16th century, with its shape preserved for many more years in the outline of a trigger guard.

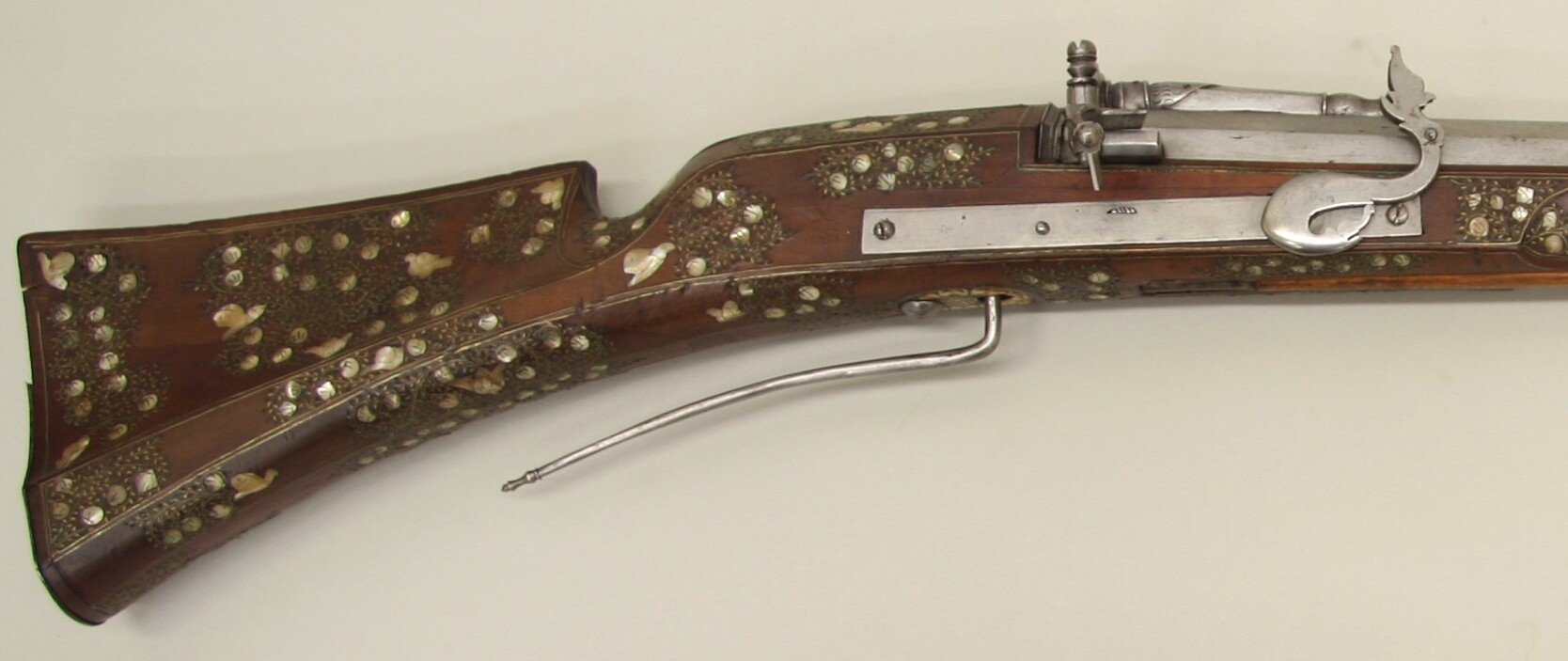
16th century trigger bar

== Glock ==
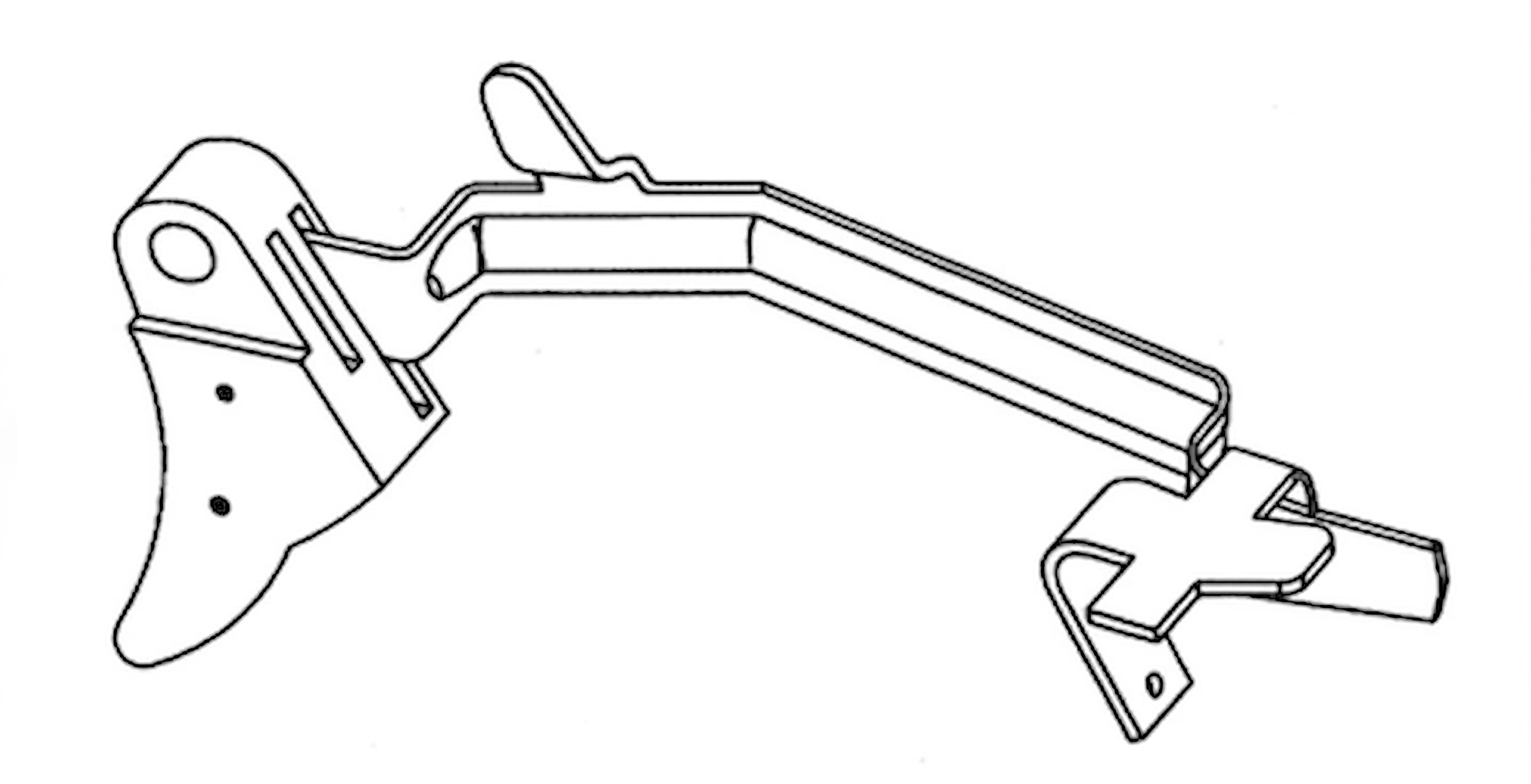
Outline of the Glock trigger bar attached to the trigger. The cruciform structure is on the right.

In Glock pistols, the trigger bar is a complex 3D-shaped component essential to the trigger system. When the trigger is pulled, the bar moves backwards and downwards to perform three historically separate functions: it tensions the striker spring, locks the firing pin, and releases the firing pin (working like a sear). The trigger bar also deactivates safeties during the trigger pull, removing the need for manual safeties and thus reducing the chance of a user error.

Glock design allows for relatively simple conversion of the pistol to the fully automatic fire. After a shot, the striker is prevented from firing again by the cruciform structure at the back end of the trigger bar. If the cruciform is disengaged from the firing pin at the proper time, the gun will fire again without the release of the trigger. While Glock manufactures the Glock 18 model with an automatic fire selector, multiple aftermarket parts for illegal select fire conversion of other Glock models ("Glock switches") have been available on the black market since the 1990s. A U.S. patent 5,705,763 (1998) describes one of these implementations.

== Sources ==
- de Groot, B.; Embleton, G. (2017). Dutch Armies of the 80 Years' War 1568–1648 (1): Infantry. Men-at-Arms. Bloomsbury Publishing. ISBN 978-1-4728-1912-3.
- Koppenhagen, Frank; Boesky, Kevin; Wecht, Christoph Hubert; Held, Tobias (2025-05-22), The Genesis of the Glock Pistol: How Gaston Glock Created the Dominant Design for Handguns, doi:10.20944/preprints202505.1764.v1
- Pavlovich, Steven (June 2014). "Select Fire Devices Found on Glock Firearms Seized by Western Australia Police". Australian Police Journal (6): 60–65.
- Steindler, R. A. (2022-08-01). "Trigger Bar". The Firearms Dictionary. Simon and Schuster. ISBN 978-0-8117-7180-1.
