= Memphis shooting =

Memphis shooting may refer to:

- Assassination of Martin Luther King Jr., the fatal shooting of an African-American civil rights leader at the Lorraine Motel on April 4, 1968
- 2022 Memphis shootings, a shooting spree in which three people were killed and three others were injured

== See also ==
- 2010 West Memphis police shootings, a shootout in West Memphis, Arkansas, in which two police officers were killed and two others were injured
