= NCLA =

NCLA may be:

- New Civil Liberties Alliance
- North Carolina Library Association
