= Auto sear =

Firearm component

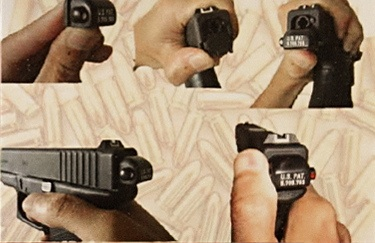
A Glock switch, a type of auto sear

An auto sear ("automatic sear"), informally known as a switch, is an aftermarket part of an automatic firearm that holds the hammer in the cocked position while the bolt of the weapon is cycling and releases the hammer/striker. It is an internal trigger actuated by the bolt/bolt carrier when placed in-battery. An auto sear is required in nearly every automatic rifle.

An auto sear allows a semi-automatic gun to be converted into one capable of automatic firing with a single, continuous pull of the trigger. The Bureau of Alcohol, Tobacco, Firearms and Explosives designated any firearm capable of firing more than one round with a single operation of the trigger mechanism as a "machine gun", and the possession of such devices is illegal under United States federal law if the person in possession does not have the required licensing.
