= 2024 Tuskegee University shooting =

Mass shooting in Alabama, U.S.

Tuskegee University shooting
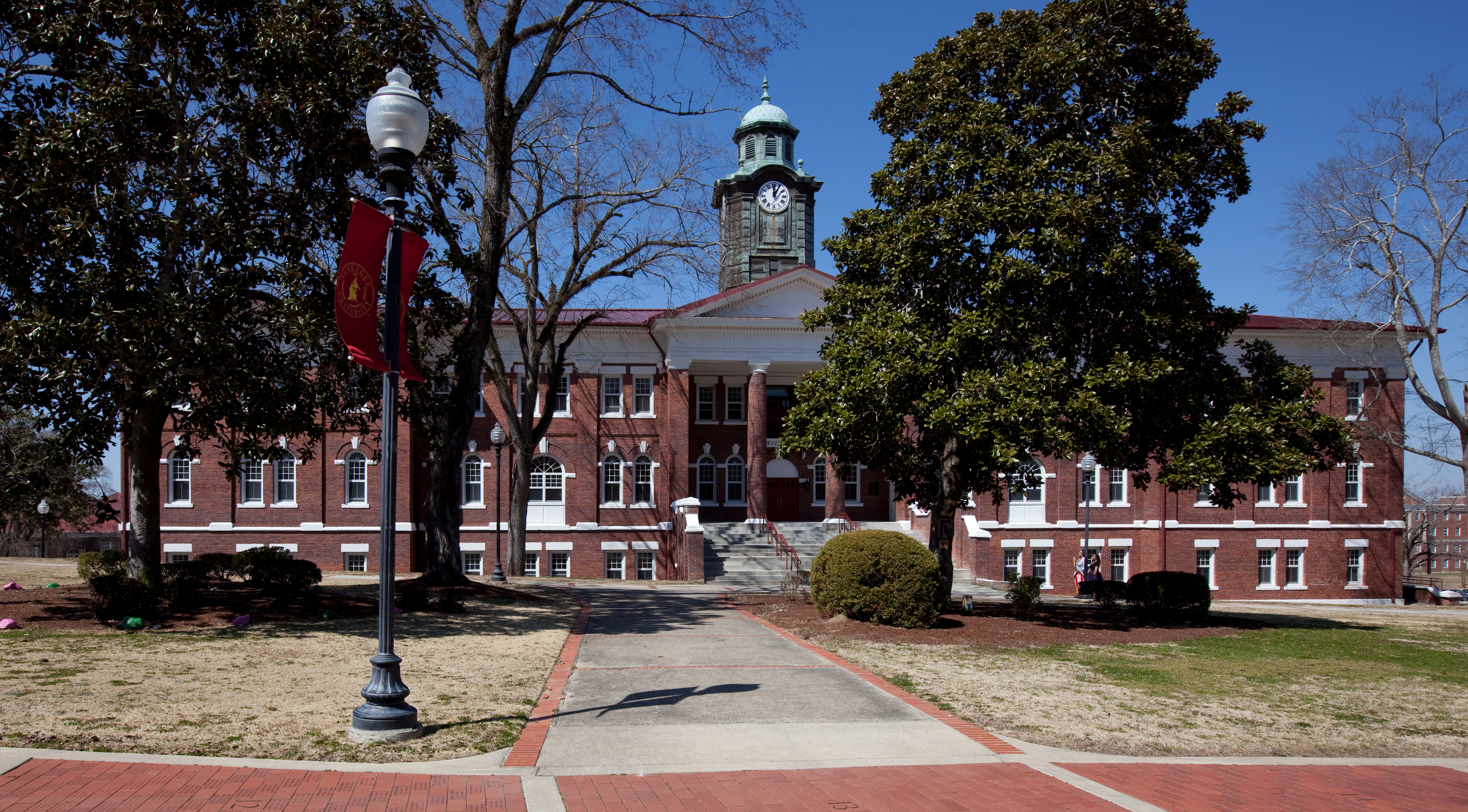
- Tuskegee University in 2015
- Location: 32°25′59″N 85°42′33″W; Tuskegee University, Tuskegee, Alabama, U.S.
- Date: November 10, 2024 c. 1:40 a.m. (CDT)
- Attack type: School shooting; mass shooting
- Weapon: Glock semi-automatic pistol equipped with Glock Switch
- Deaths: 1
- Injuries: 16 (12 by gunfire)
- Accused: Jaquez Myrick, Jeremiah Williams
- Charges: Possession of a machine gun

On November 10, 2024, one person was killed and 16 others were injured in a mass shooting at Tuskegee University. Two people were later arrested, who were in possession of semi-automatic pistols with machine gun conversion devices. The attack occurred on Sunday morning of the university's homecoming weekend. It is one of the deadliest school shootings in Alabama’s history.

== Background ==
There had been a series of mass shootings associated with homecoming events throughout the country. On October 12, one person was killed and nine others were injured near the campus of Tennessee State University in Nashville following a homecoming football game as crowds left the match when two groups of people opened fire on each other. On October 19, a 19-year-old woman was killed and four others were wounded on the campus of Albany State University in Albany, Georgia during homecoming weekend celebrations. On the same day, three people were killed and eight others were injured on a trail near Lexington, Mississippi during a post-homecoming football game celebration for Holmes County Central High School. On October 26, shots were fired into the air on the campus of North Carolina Central University in Durham during the school's homecoming celebration, which caused a lockdown, and as officers swept the campus for threats another unrelated shooting began in which four people were wounded.

On November 3, during a homecoming party for Oklahoma State University students at an event venue in Stillwater, four people were wounded when at least one person opened fire. On November 9, two people were killed and two others were injured near the University of Louisiana in Lafayette just after a homecoming game.

== Shooting ==
The shooting occurred at the end of the University's 100th Homecoming weekend at the West Commons on-campus apartments during a party at around 1:40 a.m. on November 10 when multiple gunmen inside of a Dodge Charger shot several rounds of ammunition at people before exiting and continuing to open fire. Video of the shooting posted later to social media shows people ducking for cover in a parking lot as shots are heard, and an eyewitness stated he crawled under his car and then ran to his dorm.

An 18-year-old male, La'Tavion Johnson, who was not affiliated with the university was killed, and 16 others were injured, one critically. Four of the injuries were not gunshot-related. Victims were transported to and treated at the East Alabama Medical Center in Opelika and the Baptist South Hospital in Montgomery.

== Suspects ==
Two suspects, 25-year-old Jaquez Myrick of Montgomery, Alabama, and Jeremiah Williams, were arrested and charged federally with possession of a machine gun. Law enforcement officers arrested them leaving the scene of the shooting.

The weapon was modified with a Glock switch, and Myrick admitted to firing it, but denied aiming at anyone.

In March, 2025, Myrick along with three people were indicted in state court for discharging firearms on school property. The three others charged were Jaylen Lassic, Romero Frazier and La'Darius Gant. In May, Myrick was sentenced to two years in prison for the federal charge of possessing a machine gun.

== Aftermath ==
The university canceled classes on Monday, November 11, and made grief counselors available to the students. The campus was closed after the shooting, with students and faculty required to wear ID's while on campus. The university dismissed the campus security chief and a new security chief reviewed the shooting.

A funeral for Johnson was held on November 23.

== Responses ==
The Tuskegee police chief Patrick Mardis, stated that "Some idiots started shooting."

Johnson's parents sued Tuskegee University, Myrick, the former security chief and others.

== See also ==
- List of mass shootings in the United States in 2024
- List of school shootings in the United States (2000–present)
- List of school shootings in the United States by death toll
