= Philip Hamburger =

American legal scholar

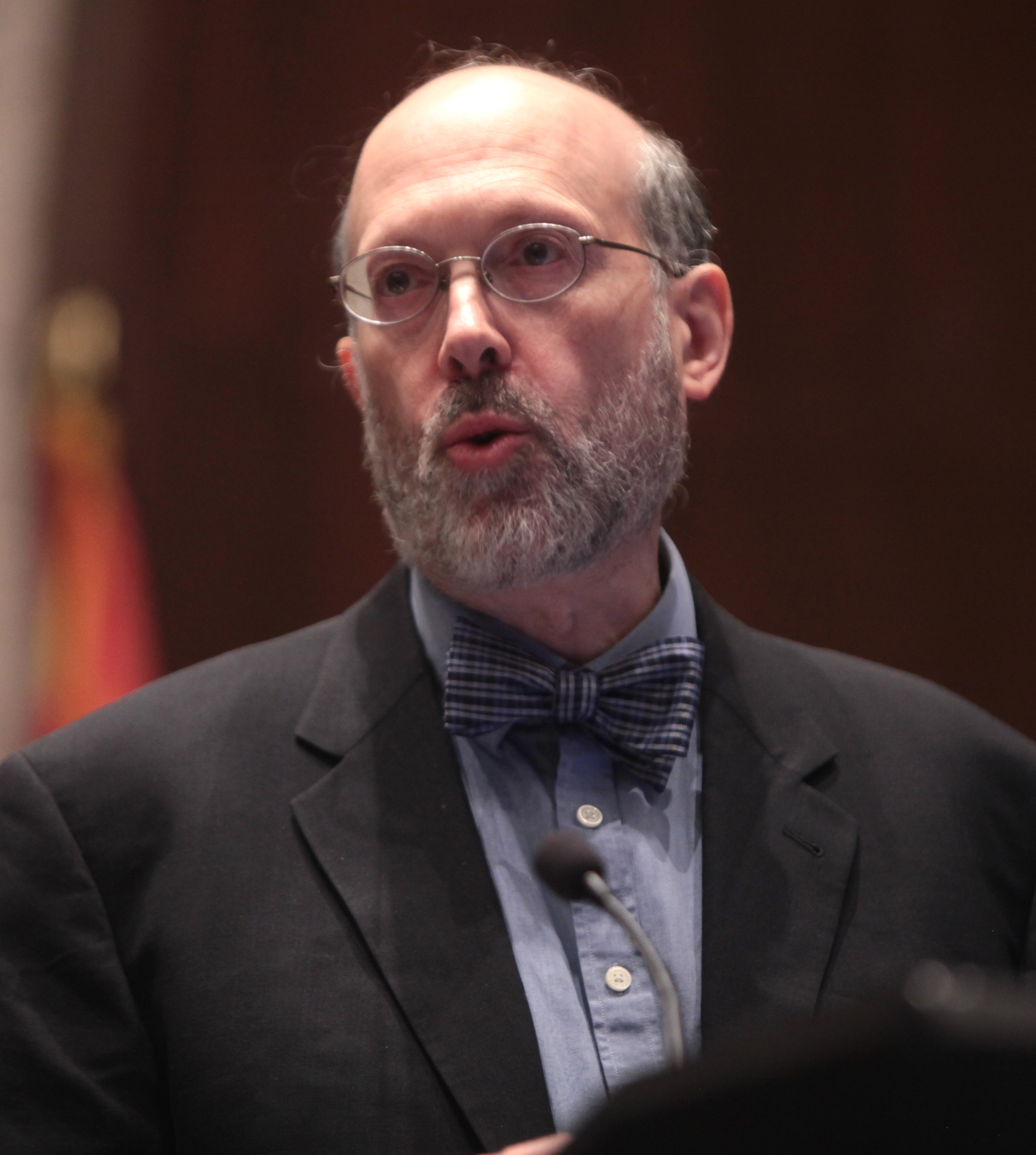
- Hamburger speaking at Arizona State University in Tempe, Arizona
- Education: Princeton University (BA); Yale University (JD)
- Scientific career
- Fields: Constitutional law Legal history
- Website: law.columbia.edu/faculty/philip-hamburger

Philip Hamburger is an American legal scholar in the fields of constitutional law and legal history. He is the Maurice and Hilda Friedman Professor of Law at Columbia Law School, where he the school's Center for Law and Liberty in 2014. He founded the New Civil Liberties Alliance in 2017 and is the CEO.

== Career ==
Hamburger received a Bachelor of Arts with a major in history from Princeton University in 1979 and a Juris Doctor from Yale Law School in 1982.

From 1982 to 1985, Hamburger was an associate of the Philadelphia law firm of Schnader, Harrison, Segal and Lewis. He then became an associate professor at the University of Connecticut Law School from 1985 to 1988, then becoming a full professor, a position he held until 1992. During that time, in the fall of 1986, he was a visiting professor at the University of Virginia Law School, and at the George Washington University National Law Center from 1991 to 1992. In 1992 he became Professor of Law and Legal History at GWU until 1995, when he became the Oswald Symister Colclough Research Professor of Law until 2000.

During his time at George Washington, Hamburger was the Jack N. Pritzker Distinguished Visiting Professor at Northwestern University Law School in the fall of 1999. He was also a visiting professor at the University of Chicago Law School in the winter of 2000. In 2000, he became the John P. Wilson Professor at the University of Chicago Law School, where he was also director of the Bigelow Program and the Legal History Program. He held this position until 2005. From there he moved to Columbia University Law School, becoming the Maurice and Hilda Friedman Professor of Law there in 2006.

== Scholarship ==
Hamburger is a scholar of the First Amendment who has studied "Jefferson's thinking and actions with respect to matters of church and state". He is known for arguing that "the First Amendment, originally thought to limit the government, has been increasingly interpreted by the Court to mean limiting religion and confining it to the private sphere."

Hamburger has criticized Justice Hugo Black, who served on the Supreme Court from 1937 to 1971, arguing that Black's views on the need for separation of church and state were deeply tainted by prominent roles in the Ku Klux Klan, which, beyond its well-known role as an anti-Black extremist hate group, also harbored extreme anti-Catholic views.

== New Civil Liberties Alliance ==
In 2017, Philip founded the New Civil Liberties Alliance, which describes itself as "a nonpartisan, nonprofit civil rights group founded ... to protect constitutional freedoms from violations by the Administrative State." The NCLA has received financial support from entities affiliated with Charles Koch and Leonard Leo.

== Publications ==
=== Books ===
- Separation of Church and State (Harvard University Press, 2002)
- Law and Judicial Duty (Harvard University Press, 2008)
- Is Administrative Law Unlawful? (University of Chicago Press, 2014)
- The Administrative Threat (Encounter Books, 2017)
- Liberal Suppression: Section 501(c)(3) and the Taxation of Speech (University of Chicago Press, 2018)
- Purchasing Submission: Conditions, Power, and Freedom (Harvard University Press, 2021)

=== Articles ===
- Revolution and Judicial Review: Chief Justice Holt's Opinion in City of London v. Wood, 94 COLUM. L. REV. 2091 (1994).
- "Liberality," Texas Law Review (2002)
- "Law and Judicial Duty," George Washington Law Review (2003)
- "The New Censorship: Institutional Review Boards," Supreme Court Review (2004)
- "Religious Liberty in Philadelphia," Emory Law Journal (2005)
- "Beyond Protection," Columbia Law Review (2009)
