= Sear (firearms) =

Part of the trigger mechanism of a firearm

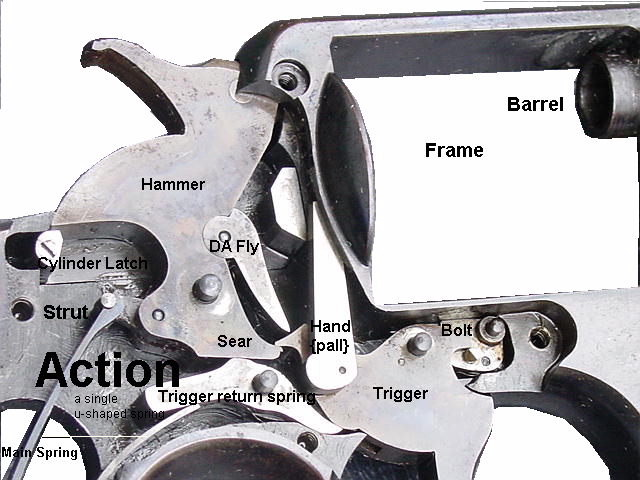
Sear shown in a revolver action

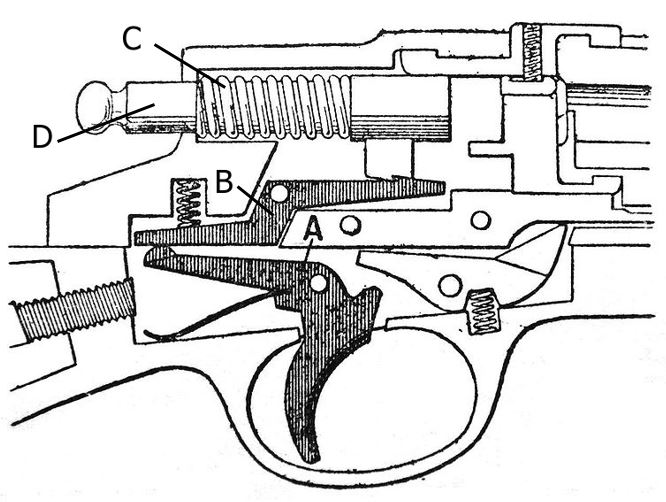
Sear (B), in a rifle

In a firearm, the sear is the part of the trigger mechanism that holds the hammer, striker, or bolt back until the correct amount of pressure has been applied to the trigger, at which point the hammer, striker, or bolt is released to discharge the weapon. The sear may be a separate part or can be a surface incorporated into the trigger. Sear mechanisms are also frequently employed in archery release aids.

== Description ==
A schematic of a semi automatic disconnector sear in a hammer fired closed-bolt firearm

A schematic of a semi-automatic disconnector sear in an open-bolt firearm

As one firearms manufacturer notes:

Sear: A sharp bar, resting in a notch (or in British: "bent") in a hammer (or in British: "tumbler"), holding the hammer back under the tension of the mainspring. When the trigger is pulled, the sear moves out of its notch, releasing the hammer and firing the gun.

The term "sear" is sometimes incorrectly used to describe a complete trigger group.

Within a trigger group, any number of sears may exist. For example, a Ruger Blackhawk single-action revolver contains one for releasing the hammer. A Ruger Redhawk double/single-action revolver contains two, one for single-action release and the other for double-action release. A Browning BLR rifle contains three sears, all used simultaneously for hammer release. On many select-fire weapons, two sears exist, one for semi-automatic fire and the second for full-automatic fire. In this case, the selector switch disengages one over the other.

Trigger sears are a key component for trigger pull characteristics. Larger sears create creep while shorter ones produce a crisp pull. Aftermarket trigger companies, such as Bold, Timney, and Jewell, produce products in which sear contact is adjustable for personal preference. When a gunsmith does a "trigger job" to improve the quality and release of a trigger pull, most often the work includes modifying the sear, such as polishing, lapping, etc.

The sear on many firearms is often connected to a disconnector, which, after a cycle of semi-automatic fire has proceeded, keeps the hammer in place until the trigger is released and the sear takes over. Many firearms, such as the M1911 pistol, use a notch in the slide of the handgun that the top end of the disconnector returns to after the trigger is released. When the trigger is still under pressure by the firearm operator, the disconnector will not retract to its resting position. On other handguns, such as the Series 80 version of the M1911, a firing pin block acts as an internal safety, which is disengaged by the disconnector after the trigger is pulled. However, because of the spring tension placed on the disconnector by the firing pin block, the weight of the trigger pull is significantly increased.

Trigger pull is related to the interaction of the sear with the trigger and the spring. It can be measured, regulated and adjusted, but it is a complicated mechanical problem.

== History ==
The sear has been found on early weapons such as the crossbow. The term may be related to the French verb serrer, "to grip", and the noun serre, "claw, talon, grasp." The term appears in Hamlet: "the Clown shall make those laugh whose lungs are tickled o'th' sear" (i.e. those who have a 'hair-trigger' laugh reaction).

== See also ==
The dictionary definition of sear#Noun at Wiktionary

- Auto sear – Firearm component

== Bibliography ==
- Guns by Dudley Pope, 1969, Hamlyn Publishing Group, Ltd.
