= Binary trigger =

Gun modification for faster firing

A binary trigger (or pull and release trigger) is a type of device that allows a semi-automatic firearm to fire at an increased rate. A binary trigger works by firing one shot upon pulling the trigger and then firing a subsequent shot upon release of the trigger.

Binary triggers are installed through modification of the fire-control group. The preinstalled trigger of a particular firearm is replaced by the binary trigger assembly. As in all semi-automatic firearms, only one round is fired within a single function of the trigger. This allows guns outfitted with a binary trigger to avoid classification as a machine gun within the definitions used by United States federal law, as stated by various ATF private-letter rulings.

However, as with all private-letter rulings, these determinations on the U.S. legality of binary triggers are limited to the specific facts about the devices being examined. Any such legal opinion may be modified or revoked at any subsequent time by the Bureau of Alcohol, Tobacco, Firearms and Explosives. Furthermore, agency opinion is not always considered legally binding.

Binary triggers became popular in the United States after the 2017 Las Vegas shooting as trigger cranks and bump stocks, devices similarly used to increase firing rate, had largely disappeared from online sellers due to fear of legal repercussions. However, in wake of the shooting, binary triggers also received scrutiny by media outlets.

== See also ==
- Bump stock
- Forced reset trigger
- Hell-fire trigger
- Trigger crank
