= Forced reset trigger =

Gun modification for faster firing

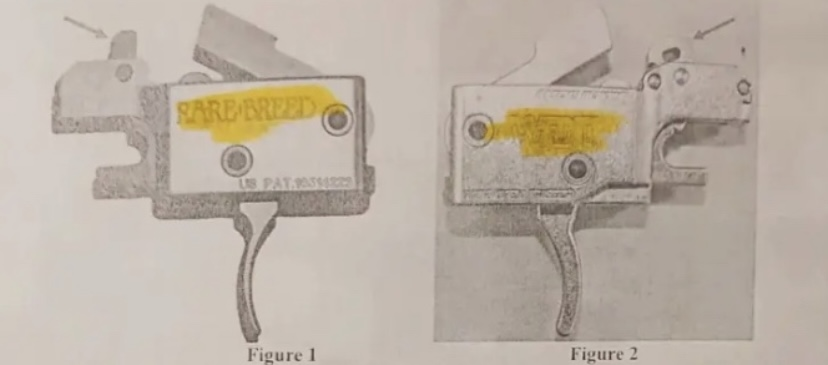
An image of a forced reset trigger from ATF’s Ammunition Technology Division: Technical Bulletin 22-01.

A forced reset trigger, also known as hard reset trigger, is a specialized trigger mechanism designed to increase the effective rate of fire of a semi-automatic firearm. It operates by using the firearm’s own cycling action to mechanically force the trigger forward after each shot is discharged, thereby resetting it much faster than a conventional semi-automatic trigger, which relies on the shooter to consciously release the trigger. This allows the shooter to maintain continuous rearward pressure on the trigger, with the internal mechanism overpowering that pressure to complete the reset. As a result, the trigger is ready to fire again as soon as the bolt returns to battery. Despite accelerating follow-up shots, the mechanism still requires a distinct trigger activation by the shooter for each round fired. These devices have been the subject of a dispute in the United States as to whether they are a machine gun under federal law.

Forced reset triggers are installed by replacing the firearm's original trigger control group with the forced reset trigger's assembly.

== History ==
A patent for a forced reset trigger titled "Flex Fire Technology" was filed by Thomas Allen Graves in 2015.

Graves states that he initially began developing forced reset trigger technology in the 1970s, focusing on modifications to Colt Navy action revolvers. Over the following decades, Graves continued refining this technology, applying it to platforms such as the Ruger 10/22 carbine and the Bersa Thunder handgun. In 2014, he claims to have invented a forced reset trigger specifically for the AR-15 platform, subsequently acquiring a patent for it in 2015. According to Graves, he later licensed his patented technology to two manufacturers of forced reset triggers.

== Legality in the United States ==
In the United States, under the Biden Administration the ATF released an open letter in March 2022 that some forced reset triggers should be regulated as machine guns under the National Firearms Act. This was a followup to a July 2021 cease-and-desist letter sent to manufacturer Rare Breed Triggers, which sued but had its case dismissed without prejudice.

On July 24th, 2024, district judge Reed O'Connor, from the Wichita Falls division of the United States District Court for the Northern District of Texas, issued a vacatur, under the Administrative Procedure Act, for the ATF's determination that some forced reset triggers are machineguns, finding that the determination was "arbitrary and capricious". ATF began returning seized devices while appealing the case to the 5th Circuit, which cited Cargill v. Garland.

In May 2025, the Trump Administration settled the lawsuit, allowing Rare Breed Triggers to continue selling the devices as long as it agreed not to develop one for pistols and to use its patents to prevent infringement that could threaten public safety.

== See also ==
- Bump stock
- Hell-fire trigger
- Trigger crank
- Binary trigger
