= Trigger crank =

Gun modification for faster firing

A trigger crank is a device that allows a semi-automatic firearm to fire at an increased rate. The trigger crank typically consists of a screw-tight clamp and crank assembly. The crank assembly positioned in front of the trigger and clamped onto the trigger guard of a semi-automatic firearm. When the crank is turned, teeth on a gear-like wheel depress the trigger and cause the weapon to fire.

Internally, the firearm is not altered; hence, only one round is fired with every stroke of the trigger. This makes the "trigger crank" avoid classification as a machine gun for purposes of gun law in the United States, as stated in an IRS revenue ruling and various other private-letter rulings by ATF. However, a "trigger crank" driven by a motor (and by extension Gatling gun) is a machine gun as was determined by the ATF in 2004.

The devices have elicited scrutiny by gun control advocates and media commentators because of the perceived lax regulation placed upon them.

== See also ==
- Binary trigger
- Bump stock
- Forced reset trigger
- Hell-fire trigger
