= Garland v. Cargill =

2024 United States Supreme Court case

- Supreme Court of the United States

Argued February 28, 2024 Decided June 14, 2024
- Full case name: Merrick B. Garland, Attorney General, et al. v. Michael Cargill
- Docket no.: 22-976
- Citations: 602 U.S. 406 (more)
- Argument: Oral argument
- Decision: Opinion

Case history
- Prior: Case dismissed, Cargill v. Barr, 502 F.Supp.3d 1163 (W.D. Tex. 2020).; Affirmed, Cargill v. Garland, 20 F.4th 1004 (5th Cir. 2021).; Reversed, Cargill v. Garland, 57 F.4th 447 (5th Cir. 2023) (en banc).

Questions presented
- Whether a bump stock device is a "machinegun" as defined in 26 U.S.C. 5845(b) because it is designed and intended for use in converting a rifle into a machinegun, i.e., into a weapon that fires "automatically more than one shot...by a single function of the trigger."

Holding
- The ATF exceeded its statutory authority by issuing a Rule that classifies a bump stock as a "machinegun" under §5845(b).

Court membership
- Chief Justice John Roberts Associate Justices Clarence Thomas · Samuel Alito; Sonia Sotomayor · Elena Kagan; Neil Gorsuch · Brett Kavanaugh; Amy Coney Barrett · Ketanji Brown Jackson

Case opinions
- Majority: Thomas, joined by Roberts, Alito, Gorsuch, Kavanaugh, Barrett
- Concurrence: Alito
- Dissent: Sotomayor, joined by Kagan, Jackson

Laws applied
- National Firearms Act of 1934; Administrative Procedure Act

Garland v. Cargill, 602 U.S. 406 (2024), was a United States Supreme Court case regarding the classification of bump stocks as "machine guns" under the National Firearms Act of 1934 (NFA) by the United States Bureau of Alcohol, Tobacco, Firearms and Explosives (ATF) in 2018. In a 6–3 decision, the Supreme Court ruled that bump stocks are not machine guns for purposes of the NFA, vacating the ATF rule and finding that the ATF exceeded its statutory authority.

== Background ==
Machine guns are regulated through a federal law in the United States known as the National Firearms Act of 1934. Since enactment, this law requires the payment of a $200 excise tax, accompanied with vetting by the ATF, before a person can legally make, possess, or transfer a machine gun, short-barreled rifle or shotgun, silencer, destructive device, or any other weapon (AOW). Transport of such items across state lines or international borders also requires prior approval by ATF. Subsection (b) in section 1 of the Act, as codified under section 5845 of the Internal Revenue Code, provides this law's definition for a machine gun:

The term "machine gun" means any weapon which shoots, is designed to shoot, or can be readily restored to shoot, automatically more than one shot, without manual reloading, by a single function of the trigger. The term shall also include the frame or receiver of any such weapon, any part designed and intended solely and exclusively, or combination of parts designed and intended, for use in converting a weapon into a machinegun, and any combination of parts from which a machinegun can be assembled if such parts are in the possession or under the control of a person.

— Sec. 1 of the National Firearms Act of 1934 (26 U.S.C. § 5845(b))

A bump stock is a firearms accessory designed to facilitate the process of bump firing. Bump firing is the practice of using the recoil of a semiautomatic firearm to increase its rate of fire. In the 2017 Las Vegas shooting, a gunman using semiautomatic rifles equipped with bump stocks fired hundreds of rounds into a crowd, killing 58 people, (Note: 58 people died on the scene shortly after the attack. This does not include the perpetrator himself (who used the revolver to commit suicide), as well as the other 2 casualties, who succumbed to complications of gunshot wounds between 2019 and 2020.) wounding more than 500 others. In the wake of the Las Vegas shooting, ten states had banned bump stocks, and while there was legislation introduced in the U.S. Congress, the bills did not pass. The Bureau of Alcohol, Tobacco, Firearms, and Explosives (ATF) also had not taken action, having treated bump stocks outside the definition of "machine guns" in the NFA. Following the Parkland high school shooting in February 2018, President Donald Trump spoke out against bump stocks, and the National Rifle Association of America (NRA) also threw its weight behind banning bump stocks. The ATF began public comment for a new run in March 2018 which received over 36,000 comments. Most supported the ban, but other comments cautioned that the ATF's rule seemed like a runaround the Congressional definition and could lead to criminalization of semi-automatic firearms. Following the public commenting period, the ATF proceeded to publish a new rule in December 2018 to repudiate its previous stance and "clarify" that bump stocks were machine guns as defined under the National Firearms Act.

=== Prior legal history ===
Ever since the 2018 ATF final rule, the legality of the final rule has been challenged at the state and federal level, raising the question if bump stock could be classified as machine guns under the NFA. In one case, the Supreme Court opted not to hear a challenge to the final rule brought by firearm owners and firearm rights organizations, with Justice Neil Gorsuch writing "Whether bump stocks can be fairly reclassified and effectively outlawed as machineguns under existing statutory definitions, I do not know and could not say without briefing and argument. Nor do I question that Congress might seek to enact new legislation directly regulating the use and possession of bump stocks." The Court also denied other cases that challenged the final rule.

The plaintiff in the case was Michael Cargill, owner of Central Texas Gun Works, who in 2018 purchased two bump stocks a few months before the ATF published its new rule. On March 25, 2019, Cargill surrendered his bump stocks to the ATF under protest, and filed suit later the same day in the Austin Division of the United States District Court for the Western District of Texas challenging the rule. Following a bench trial, district judge David Alan Ezra ruled in favor of the government, ruling that the act of pulling the trigger on a bump stock-modified firearm "is automatic fire". A three-judge panel of the United States Court of Appeals for the Fifth Circuit affirmed the judgment in December 2021, with circuit judge Stephen A. Higginson, writing for the unanimous majority that "ATF's interpretation of the statute is the best interpretation. The phrase 'single function of the trigger,' as used in the National Firearms Act, means 'a single pull of the trigger and analogous motions'". Following additional briefing and argument, the en banc court reversed and remanded in January 2023 in a 13–3 decision. The majority, written by circuit judge Jennifer Walker Elrod, wrote that it was up to Congress to amend the law to classify bump stocks as machine guns, and that the ATF final rule did not provide "fair warning that possession of a non-mechanical bump stock is a crime." The United States Court of Appeals for the Sixth Circuit also decided against the ATF's final rule in April 2023.

== Supreme Court ==
On April 6, 2023, U.S. Attorney General Merrick B. Garland petitioned the court for a writ of certiorari in Cargill's case. The court granted the petition on November 3. Oral arguments were heard on February 28, 2024. Cargill was represented by the New Civil Liberties Alliance.

On June 14, 2024, the Court ruled 6–3 in favor of Cargill, ruling that the ATF exceeded its authority in ruling bump stocks as machine guns. The majority opinion, written by Justice Clarence Thomas, stated that under the National Firearms Act, bump stock attachments did not qualify as machine guns since, even if they did fire more than one round per trigger pull, they did not do so automatically, and thus could not be regulated by the ATF through administrative action, and that only congressional legislation could empower the agency with such authority. Justice Thomas was joined by the Chief Justice, John Roberts, and by Justices Samuel Alito, Neil Gorsuch, Brett Kavanaugh, and Amy Coney Barrett.

Thomas's opinion identified that the National Firearms Act "defines 'function of the trigger' to include not only 'a single pull of the trigger' but also any 'analogous motions' ... ATF concedes that one such analogous motion that qualifies as a single function of the trigger is 'sliding the rifle forward' to bump the trigger", and such "every bump is a separate 'function of the trigger[...] semiautomatic rifles equipped with bump stocks are therefore not machineguns." Thomas also explained that if the ATF took their definition of machine gun used in the bump stock rule to its ultimate conclusion, then it would have also classified semiautomatic rifles without bump stocks as machine guns since "bump" firing can be achieved without the need for the bump stock. Finally, Thomas also stated that §5845(b) "specifies the precise action that must 'automatically' cause a weapon to fire 'more than one shot'—a 'single function of the trigger'"; as "a shooter must also actively maintain just the right amount of forward pressure on the rifle's front grip with his nontrigger hand" when using a bump stock, this qualified as an additional function and thus did not meet the requirements for the definition of a machine gun. Thomas also identified that prior to the Las Vegas shooting, the ATF across multiple administrations had previously declined to declare bump stocks as machine guns, but "abruptly reversed course" in its wake.

=== Concurrence ===
Justice Alito wrote a concurring opinion expressing the need to take the statutory meaning of the law into account. Alito wrote the following: "There can be little doubt that the Congress that enacted [the National Firearms Act] would not have seen any material difference between a machinegun and a semiautomatic rifle equipped with a bump stock. But the statutory text is clear, and we must follow it." Alito stated the proper course of action to outlaw bump stocks would be for Congress to amend the National Firearms Act to include bump stocks within its scope, rather than trying to have the ATF effectuate the same result through administrative fiat.

=== Dissent ===
Justice Sonia Sotomayor wrote the dissent, joined by Justices Elena Kagan and Ketanji Brown Jackson. Sotomayor read her dissent from the bench, which is not a common procedure and is designed to capture attention and add "gravitas to the opinion." Sotomayor argued that Congress wanted to restrict the availability of machine guns "because [machine guns] eliminated the need for a person rapidly to pull the trigger himself to fire continuously". Hence, Sotomayor argued that the majority opinion would render the National Firearms Act less effective: "[The majority opinion] casts aside Congress's definition of 'machinegun' and seizes upon one that is inconsistent with the ordinary meaning of the statutory text and unsupported by context or purpose. When I see a bird that walks like a duck, swims like a duck, and quacks like a duck, I call that bird a duck."

== Reactions ==
Reporting in news outlets such as Reason and National Review praised the majority opinion for keeping its focus on the definition in question, while other outlets such as Slate and MSNBC criticized the majority opinion as being "tone deaf", especially in light of the 2017 Las Vegas shooting which prompted the now since-vacated ATF final rule. Vox Media reported the outcome as being a "party-line vote" between Justices appointed to the Supreme Court during a Democratic Party presidency and those appointed during a Republican Party presidency. Cargill welcomed the decision, stating "I stood and fought, and because of this, the bump stock case is going to be the case that saves everything." Some survivors of the Las Vegas shooting were taken aback by the outcome in the decision.

President Joe Biden and Senate Majority Leader Chuck Schumer urged immediate Congressional action for amending the National Firearms Act to outlaw bump stocks, with Biden stating, "send me a bill and I will sign it immediately." Although it was under his administration that the ATF final rule on bump stocks first came into effect, then-former-President Donald Trump stated through a campaign spokesperson that "the [Supreme] Court has spoken and their decision should be respected". After the ruling, a bill (Note: S. 1909 - Banning Unlawful Machinegun Parts (BUMP) Act) with bipartisan support was introduced before the Senate to outlaw semi-automatic firearms equipped with devices (including bump stocks) that increase their rate of fire. Its passage by unanimous consent was blocked by Senator Pete Ricketts, who said, "It's not really about bump stocks, this bill is about banning as many firearm accessories as possible. It’s an unconstitutional attack on law-abiding gun owners." The bill subsequently died upon adjournment of the 118th Congress on January 3, 2025.
