= Hell-fire trigger =

Gun modification for faster firing

A hell-fire trigger is a device that allows a semi-automatic firearm to fire at an increased rate. The hell-fire clamps to the trigger guard behind the trigger and presses a "finger" against the back of the trigger to increase the force that returns the trigger to its forward position, effectively decreasing the time required for the trigger to reset, allowing for a faster follow-up shot.

Internally, the firearm is not altered. As in all semi-automatic firearms, only one round is fired with every stroke of the trigger. This allows the "hell-fire trigger" to avoid classification as a machine gun within the definitions used by United States federal law, as stated in an ATF private-letter ruling from 1990.

However, as with all private-letter rulings, this determination on the U.S. legality of hell-fire triggers is limited to the facts regarding the specific device being examined. The 1990 opinion may be modified or revoked at any subsequent time by the Bureau of Alcohol, Tobacco, Firearms and Explosives. Furthermore, agency opinion is not always considered legally binding.

During the Waco siege, David Koresh, leader of the Branch Davidians, reportedly told authorities that he utilized semi-automatic guns with the part installed. Another well-known case of its reported use is the 101 California Street shooting.

== See also ==
- Bump stock
- Binary trigger
- Forced reset trigger
- Trigger crank
