= New Civil Liberties Alliance =

Nonprofit public interest law firm

- Formation: 2017; 9 years ago
- Founder: Philip Hamburger
- Type: Nonprofit
- Purpose: "To protect constitutional freedoms from violations by the Administrative State"
- Headquarters: Washington, D.C.
- Location: United States
- Methods: Legal advocacy
- President and Chief Legal Officer: Mark Chenoweth
- Revenue: $8.3 million (2024)
- Staff: 27 (2024)
- Website: nclalegal.org

New Civil Liberties Alliance (NCLA) is a 501(c)(3) nonprofit public interest law firm founded in 2017 by Columbia Law School professor Philip Hamburger. The group challenges what it views as unlawful uses of administrative power. It is headquartered in Arlington, Virginia

Bloomberg Law wrote that the group was founded "to fill a gap in the legal ecosystem: the protection of individual rights from entrenched government regulation" and that the group had "quickly emerged as a top US Supreme Court litigator...helping steer a broad high court challenge to government agency power." In 2024, legal scholar Jonathan H. Adler said that the NCLA had "become a significant player in a relatively short time by raising some administrative law questions that hadn't been getting as much or a lot of attention."

== Organizational overview ==
The NCLA's president and chief legal officer is Mark Chenoweth. The group had 27 staff members as of 2024 and received $4.82 million in revenue in 2022. The NCLA has received financial support from entities affiliated with Charles Koch and Leonard Leo.

=== Cases ===
In 2023, the NCLA filed an appeal with the Supreme Court of the United States on behalf of Emmanuel Lemelson, a hedge fund manager accused of civil securities fraud, and subsequently found liable for making statements that were untrue, but not fraudulent. The petition hinged on a constitutional freedom of expression question: can the SEC "punish commentary about publicly traded corporations that contains a few purported misstatements or omissions when a jury has cleared the accused of all fraud and deception charges"?

Also in 2023, the NCLA represented Judge Pauline Newman of the United States Court of Appeals for the Federal Circuit with respect to efforts by colleagues on the court to unilaterally suspend her from her judicial duties. The NCLA obtained expert reports indicating that the judge was fit to serve, and challenged the constitutionality of the effective removal of an Article III United States federal judge from office without due process of law.

The NCLA challenged President Joe Biden's student loan forgiveness plan, arguing that "A forgiveness program of this magnitude should have gone through rulemaking." The NCLA argued that Biden's plan violated the Constitution's Appropriations Clause, which says Congress can decide what debt owed to the Treasury can be canceled.

The NCLA, on behalf of five social media users, joined several states in bringing a First Amendment case against the Biden administration, arguing that the administration had violated free speech rights by pressuring major social media platforms to remove misleading or false content about COVID-19. In September 2023, a panel of the United States Court of Appeals for the Fifth Circuit ruled that the Biden administration had overstepped the First Amendment when it "coerced the platforms to make their moderation decisions by way of intimidating messages and threats of adverse consequences" and "significantly encouraged the platforms' decisions by commandeering their decision-making processes." Murthy v. Missouri was decided by the U.S. Supreme Court on June 26, 2024. The Court ruled 6–3 that the states and social media users lacked standing to bring suit, with the majority opinion finding that the plaintiffs lacked any "concrete link" between the content moderation decisions that the plaintiffs complained of and the conduct of government officials.

The NCLA argued in favor of overturning Chevron deference, a principle directing courts hearing regulatory disputes to defer to a government agency's reasonable interpretation when the governing law is ambiguous. In the 2024 decision Loper Bright Enterprises v. Raimondo (in which NCLA represented the Rhode Island plaintiffs), the U.S. Supreme Court overturned Chevron deference.

The NCLA argued in favor of overturning a Bureau of Alcohol, Tobacco, Firearms, and Explosives (ATF) 2018 rule that banned bump stocks, gun stocks that can be used to assist in bump firing which allows semi-automatic firearms to somewhat mimic fully automatic weapons. The NCLA represented Michael Cargill, the owner of Central Texas Gun Works in the case, after he surrendered two bump stocks to the ATF. The 2024 U.S. Supreme Court decision in Garland v. Cargill held that the ATF exceeded its authority in ruling bump stocks as machine guns.

In April 2025, the NCLA filed a lawsuit challenging the Trump administration's imposition of sweeping Chinese import tariffs. The lawsuit alleges that Trump lacked the legal authority to impose the tariffs and that he had misapplied the International Emergency Economic Powers Act. An NCLA attorney said "By invoking emergency power to impose an across-the-board tariff on imports from China that the statute does not authorize, President Trump has misused that power, usurped Congress's right to control tariffs, and upset the Constitution's separation of powers."

== See also ==
- West Virginia v. EPA (2022)
- Cargill v. Garland (2023)
