= Automatic firearm =

Firearm that fires continuously while the trigger is depressed

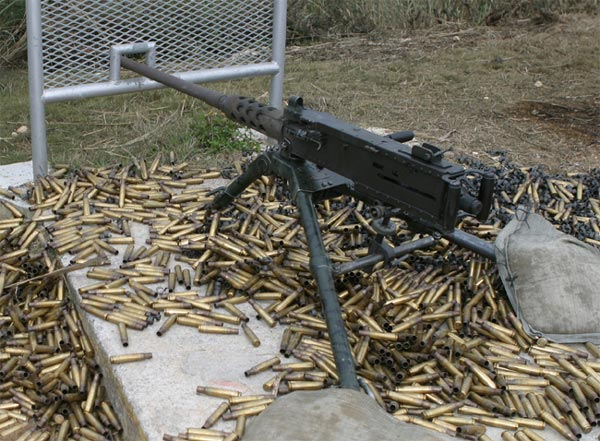
A M2 Browning machine gun, surrounded by ejected cartridge cases

An automatic firearm or fully automatic firearm (to avoid confusion with semi-automatic firearms) is a self-loading firearm that continuously chambers and fires rounds when the trigger mechanism is actuated. The action of an automatic firearm is capable of harvesting the excess energy released from a previous discharge to feed a new ammunition round into the chamber, and then igniting the propellant and discharging the projectile (either bullet, shot, or slug) by delivering a hammer or striker impact on the primer.

If both the feeding and ignition procedures are automatically cycled, the weapon will be considered "fully automatic" and will fire continuously as long as the trigger is kept depressed and the ammunition feeding (either from a magazine or a belt) remains available. In contrast, a firearm is considered "semi-automatic" if it only automatically cycles to chamber new rounds (i.e. self-loading), but does not automatically fire off the shot unless the user manually resets (usually by releasing) and re-actuates the trigger, so only one round gets discharged with each individual trigger-pull. A burst-fire firearm is an "in-between" of fully and semi-automatic firearms, firing a brief continuous "burst" of multiple rounds with each trigger-pull, but then will require a manual re-actuation of the trigger to fire another burst.

Automatic firearms are further defined by the type of cycling principles used, such as recoil operation, blowback, blow forward, or gas operation.

== Rates of fire ==
=== Cyclic rate ===
Self-loading firearms are designed with varying rates of fire due to having different purposes. The speed with which a self-loading firearm can cycle through the functions of:

1. Fire
2. Eject
3. Load
4. Cock

is referred to as its cyclic rate. In fully automatic firearms, the cyclic rate is tailored to the purpose the firearm is intended to serve. Anti-aircraft machine guns often have extremely high rates of fire to maximize the probability of a hit. In infantry support weapons, these rates of fire are typically much lower and in some cases, vary with the design of the particular firearm. The MG 34 is a WWII-era machine gun which falls under the category of a "general purpose machine gun". Its recoil-operated firing mechanism allowed it to fire between 800 and 900 rounds per minute, but it was designed with a theoretical cyclic rate of fire between 1,000 and 1,200 rounds per minute.

=== Effective rate of fire ===
Continuous fire generates high temperatures in a firearm's barrel and increased temperatures throughout most of its structure. If fired continuously, the components of the firearm will eventually suffer structural failure. All firearms, whether they are semi-automatic, fully automatic, or otherwise, will overheat and fail if fired indefinitely. This issue tends to present itself primarily with fully automatic fire. For example, the MG34 may have a calculated cyclic rate of 1,200 rounds per minute, but is likely to overheat and fail in the space of one minute of continuous fire.

Semi-automatic firearms may also overheat if continuously fired. Recoil plays a significant role in the time it takes to reacquire one's sight picture, ultimately reducing the effective rate of fire.

== Automatic firearm types ==
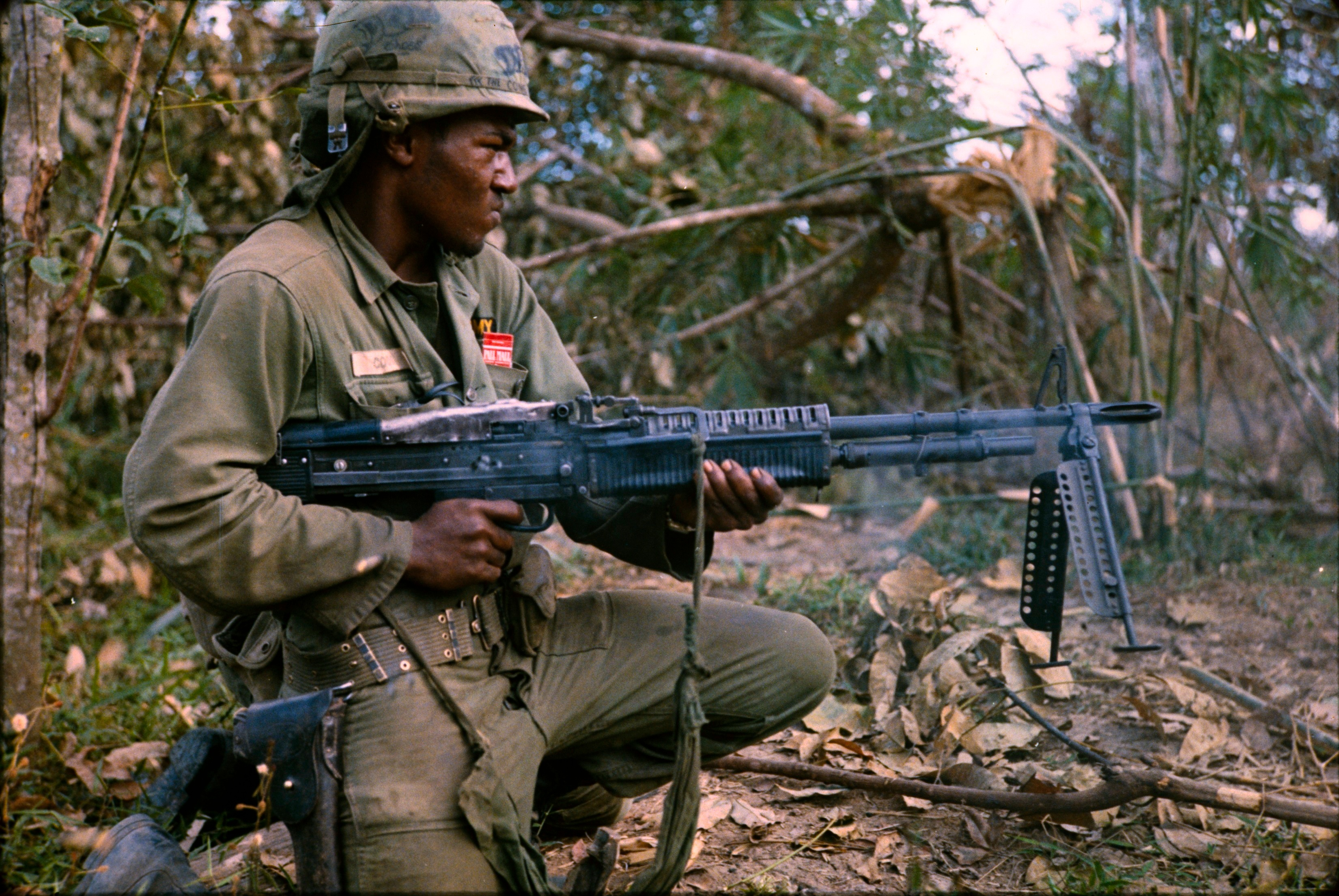
An American soldier with an M60 machine gun during the Vietnam War

Automatic firearms can be divided into six main categories:

Automatic rifle
The standard type of service rifles in most modern militaries, usually capable of selective fire. Assault rifles are a specific type of select-fire rifle chambered in an intermediate cartridge and fed via a high-capacity detachable magazine. Battle rifles are similar, but chambered in a full-powered cartridge.
Automatic shotgun
A type of combat shotgun capable of firing shotgun shells automatically and semi-automatically.
Machine gun
A large group of heavier firearms used for suppressive automatic fire of rifle cartridges, normally attached to a mount or supported by a bipod. Depending on size, weight and role, machine guns are divided into heavy, medium or light machine guns. The ammunition is often belt-fed.
Submachine gun
An automatic, short rifle (carbine) typically chambered for pistol cartridges. Rarely used nowadays in military contexts due to a rise in body armor. However, they are commonly used by police forces and close protection units in many parts of the world.
Personal defense weapon
A new breed of automatic firearms that combines the light weight and size of the submachine gun with the medium power caliber ammunition of the rifle, thus in practice creating a submachine gun with body armor penetration capability.
Machine pistol
A handgun-style firearm, capable of fully automatic or burst fire. They are sometimes equipped with a foldable shoulder stock, to promote accuracy during automatic fire, creating similarities to their submachine gun counterparts. Some machine pistols are shaped similarly to semi-automatics (e.g., the Glock 18, Beretta 93R). As with SMGs, machine pistols fire pistol caliber cartridges (such as the 9mm, .40, .45 ACP etc.).

== Burst mode ==
Burst mode is an automatic fire mode that limits the number of rounds fired with each trigger pull, most often to three rounds. After the burst is fired, the firearm will not fire again until the trigger is released and pulled again. Burst mode was implemented into firearms due to the inaccuracy of fully automatic fire in combat, and because of suggestions that fully automatic fire has no genuine benefit. Additionally, many militaries have restricted automatic fire in combat due to the ammunition wasted.

== Regulation ==
Possession of automatic firearms tends to be restricted to members of military and law enforcement organizations in most developed countries, even in those that permit the civilian use of semi-automatic firearms. Where automatic weapons are permitted, restrictions and regulations on their possession and use may be far stricter than for other firearms. In the United States, taxes and strict regulations affect the manufacture and sale of fully automatic firearms under the National Firearms Act of 1934 and the Firearm Owners Protection Act of 1986. The latter of these acts banned civilian machine gun ownership, grandfathering in existing legally owned weapons. As legally owned weapons were registered under the NFA, this meant only previously registered automatic weapons may be purchased. A prospective user must go through an application process administered by the Bureau of Alcohol, Tobacco, Firearms and Explosives (ATF), which requires a federal tax payment of $200 and a thorough criminal background check. The tax payment buys a revenue stamp, which is the legal document allowing possession of an automatic firearm. The use of a gun trust to register with the ATF has become an increasingly popular method of acquisition and ownership of automatic firearms.

== Similar weapons ==
Other similar weapons not usually referred to as automatic firearms include the following:

- Autocannon, which are 15 mm or greater in bore diameter and thus considered cannons, not small arms.
- Gatling guns, multiple-barrel designs, often used with external power supplies to generate rates of fire higher than automatic firearms.

== See also ==
- Auto sear
- Bump stock
- Forced reset trigger
- Federal Firearms License
- Firearm action
- Gun politics
