= 2022 Memphis shootings =

Spree shooting in Tennessee, U.S.

- Memphis (Tennessee) Memphis (the United States)
- Location: Memphis, Tennessee, United States
- Date: September 7, 2022; 4 years ago c. 12:56 a.m. – 8:58 p.m. (CDT)
- Attack type: Spree shooting, triple-murder
- Weapon: Glock 45 handgun (modified with a Glock switch)
- Deaths: 3
- Injuries: 3
- Perpetrator: Ezekiel Kelly
- Sentence: Three consecutive life terms plus 221 years without parole

On September 7, 2022, three people were killed and three others were injured after 19-year-old Ezekiel Kelly went on a shooting spree in Memphis, Tennessee, United States. The attack was livestreamed on Facebook Live.

== Shootings ==
Location of events
1 Murder of Tunstall
2 Murder of Clark
3 Norris road shooting
4 Autozone shooting, livestream ends
5 Murder of Parker
6 Pursuit and arrest of Kelly

The shootings began at around 12:56 a.m., when 24-year-old Dewayne “Amir” Tunstall was found fatally shot outside a house on Lyndale Avenue. The incident began when 19-year-old Ezekiel Kelly was at a friend's house to hang out with four other people, including Tunstall. During the hangout, one of the men revealed his upcoming food truck business, which he worked on with Tunstall. Utilizing the food truck, the men ate chicken in the backyard. According to a witness, Kelly made bizarre comments about how he's going to kill someone and also said "watch this" during the dinner. Afterwards, the men went to the house's driveway and stood around a car to talk, with Kelly standing next to Tunstall. Kelly then pulled out his gun and opened fire, killing Tunstall. The three other men got in the car and screamed at Kelly to leave when he tried to join them. Kelly proceeded to follow them to another house in his Infiniti G37 sedan. After the occupants of both vehicles got out, one of the men asked Kelly about Tunstall. Kelly responded: "He gone. It is what it is". Kelly also asked the friends for directions. The friends told him to leave.

At 4:35 p.m., 62-year-old Richard Clark was found fatally shot on South Parkway East at a gas station. Video surveillance showed the gunman driving up to Clark's Toyota Camry as he was entering the vehicle. Kelly stopped his car next to Clark's vehicle. Kelly, with his windows down, proceeded to fire multiple rounds through Clark's driver-side window, killing him. Kelly quickly drove away from the scene.

A minute later, a woman with multiple gunshots to the leg was found at the intersection of Norris Road and Interstate 240. The woman was sitting in her car with her father fixing a car tire outside. Kelly drove up to the woman and asked her for directions to Whitehaven. After the woman responded, Kelly shot her before driving away. The gunman fled eastbound on Norris Road.

As he was driving, Kelly started a livestream on Facebook Live. During the stream, he rambled and confessed to killing Tunstall while mocking him for being "fake". He also repeatedly talked about being high on drugs, and his plan to kill more people before dying in a police shootout. During the stream, Kelly shared delusions about being a hitman for the Crips, and talked about killing snitches. He also rapped during the stream with visible foam coming out of his mouth. At some point, he fired multiple rounds at a business in a drive-by style shooting, hitting no one.

At 5:50 p.m., a man was found in critical condition inside of an AutoZone on Jackson Avenue with multiple bullets wounds to the chest. At around the same time in the shooter's Facebook Live livestream, the shooter stopped and exited his vehicle, entered the AutoZone, shot a man, and exited the store while screaming: "Bitch! I'm killing shit for real!" At this point, the livestream ended.

At 5:56 p.m., police received a tip from Kelly's mother and sister that Kelly was on Facebook Live claiming that he would harm civilians. They subsequently launched a manhunt for Kelly and ordered a shelter-in-place.

At 7:21 p.m., the gunman shot two people at Poplar Avenue, killing one. Just before the shooting at Poplar Avenue, Kelly crashed his sedan as he turned left in front of a truck. After the crash, Kelly got out of his vehicle and walked towards a black sedan. The driver drove away upon seeing Kelly. Kelly then opened fire at a blue Honda Pilot, hitting the driver in his arm and shooting through the pants leg of a nearby man. The driver quickly drove off. Kelly continued walking west down Poplar Avenue. He encountered a grey Toyota C-HR SUV. 38-year-old Allison Parker and her daughter were in the SUV. Upon seeing Kelly, the daughter exited out of the vehicle from the passenger's side door, and tried running to the driver's side to get her mother to leave the vehicle. Kelly entered the vehicle through the passenger's side and fatally shot Parker. Parker got out of the vehicle and collapsed to the ground. Kelly drove off in Parker's SUV.

At 8:52 p.m., the gunman carjacked a man driving a Dodge Challenger at a gas station in Stateline Road West in Mississippi. The man recalled Kelly parking next to him as he was pumping gas into his car. Kelly pulled down his window and asked him for "percs". The man recognized Kelly's face from the news and quickly ran away. Kelly entered the Challenger and drove off back to Tennessee.

Minutes later, at 8:57 p.m., police located the vehicle northbound on Interstate 55. They engaged the vehicle in a car chase before arresting Kelly at the intersection of Ivan road and Hodge road. Kelly was arrested at 9:15 p.m.

Police later stated that Corteria Wright, a 17-year-old girl initially believed to have been killed in the shootings was killed by another suspect.

== Perpetrator and legal proceedings ==
Ezekiel Kelly (born October 14, 2002), the shooter, was previously convicted of a felony stemming from a shooting in 2020 where two people were shot and wounded. His attorneys detailed that he had a history of homelessness, mental illness, and drug abuse.

Shortly before he was arrested, Kelly suffered injuries after allegedly crashing a stolen vehicle in Whitehaven. He was charged with first degree murder. Additional charges were also filed including two additional counts of first-degree murder, along with terrorism and carjacking.

On March 27, 2023, prosecutors said they would pursue the death penalty if Kelly was convicted.

On August 13, 2025, Kelly pleaded guilty in the shootings and was sentenced to three life sentences without parole plus 221 years in prison. Kelly is currently incarcerated in the Riverbend Maximum Security Institution.

== See also ==
- Gun violence in the United States
