= Bump stock =

Gun stocks that can be used to assist in bump firing

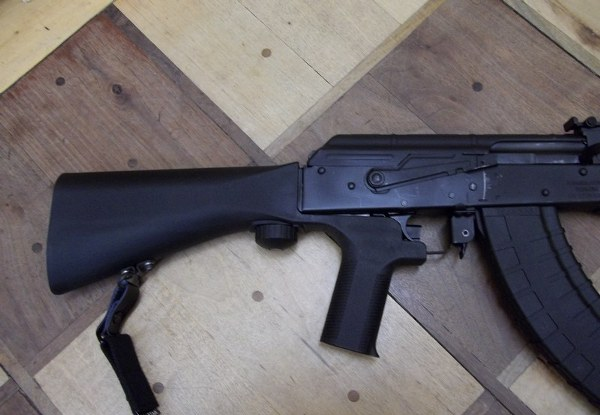
A Slide Fire Solutions bump fire stock on a WASR-10 semi-automatic rifle

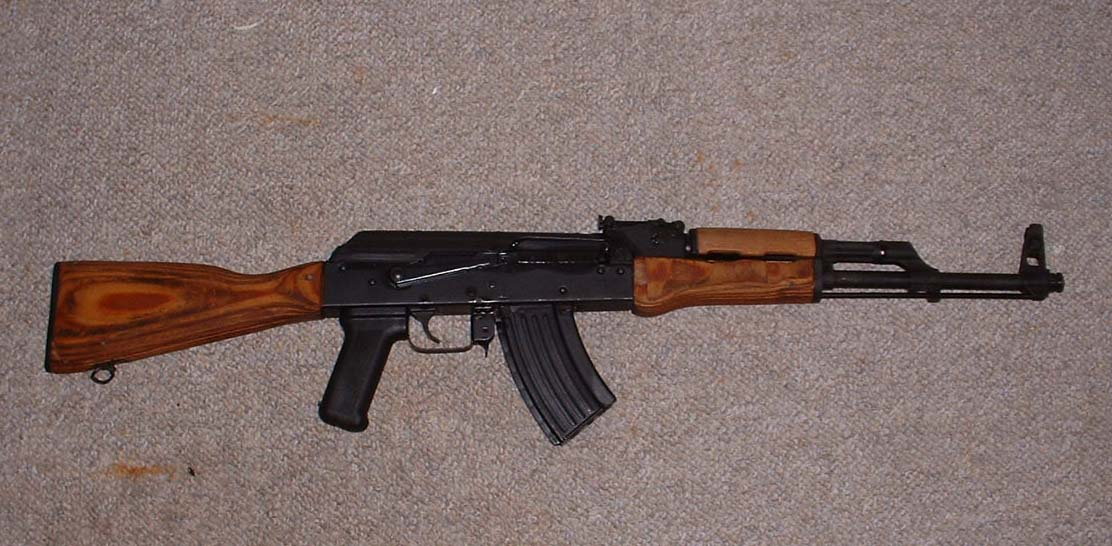
WASR-10 rifle without a bump stock fitted

Bump stocks or bump fire stocks are gun stocks that can be used to assist in bump firing, the act of using the recoil of a semi-automatic firearm to fire cartridges in rapid succession.

The legality of bump stocks in the United States came under question following the 2017 Las Vegas shooting, in which 60 people were killed and 867 people injured. The gunman was found to have fitted bump stocks to his weapons, though no evidence was reported in which any of these specific weapons were actually used in the shooting. Several states passed legislation restricting ownership of bump stocks following this shooting. In December 2018, the United States Bureau of Alcohol, Tobacco, Firearms and Explosives (ATF) published a rule that bump stocks constituted "machine guns", and thus were illegal under federal law. The Supreme Court vacated this regulation in June 2024 in Garland v. Cargill. Bump stocks remain illegal in 15 states and the District of Columbia based on state bans not affected by the Supreme Court ruling.

== Bump fire stocks ==
A bump stock causes the trigger (red) to be actuated when the receiver moves forward, being reset each round by receiver recoil. This allows semi-automatic firearms to somewhat mimic fully automatic weapons.

Bump fire stocks are gun stocks that are specially designed to make bump firing easier, but do not make the firearm automatic. Essentially, bump stocks assist rapid fire by "bumping" the trigger against one's finger (as opposed to one's finger pulling on the trigger), thus allowing the firearm's recoil, plus constant forward pressure by the non-shooting arm, to actuate the trigger. Bump fire stocks can be placed on a few common weapons such as the AR or AK families. They can achieve rates of fire between 400 and 800 rounds per minute depending on the gun. By 2018, bump fire stocks in the United States were sold for around $100 and up, with prices increasing prior to enactment of federal regulation.

Slide Fire Solutions, the inventor, patent holder, and leading manufacturer of bump stocks, suspended sales after bump stocks were used in the 2017 Las Vegas shooting, but resumed sales a month later. On May 20, 2018, 95 days after the Parkland high school shooting, Slide Fire Solutions permanently halted sales and production of its products even though bump stocks were not involved in the shooting. However, after the June 2024 ruling, Slide Fire announced they would resume the production of bump fire stocks.

== Regulatory status in the United States ==
Legality of bump stocks in the United States at the state level as of 2019. Bump stocks legal Legality unclear Bump stocks illegal

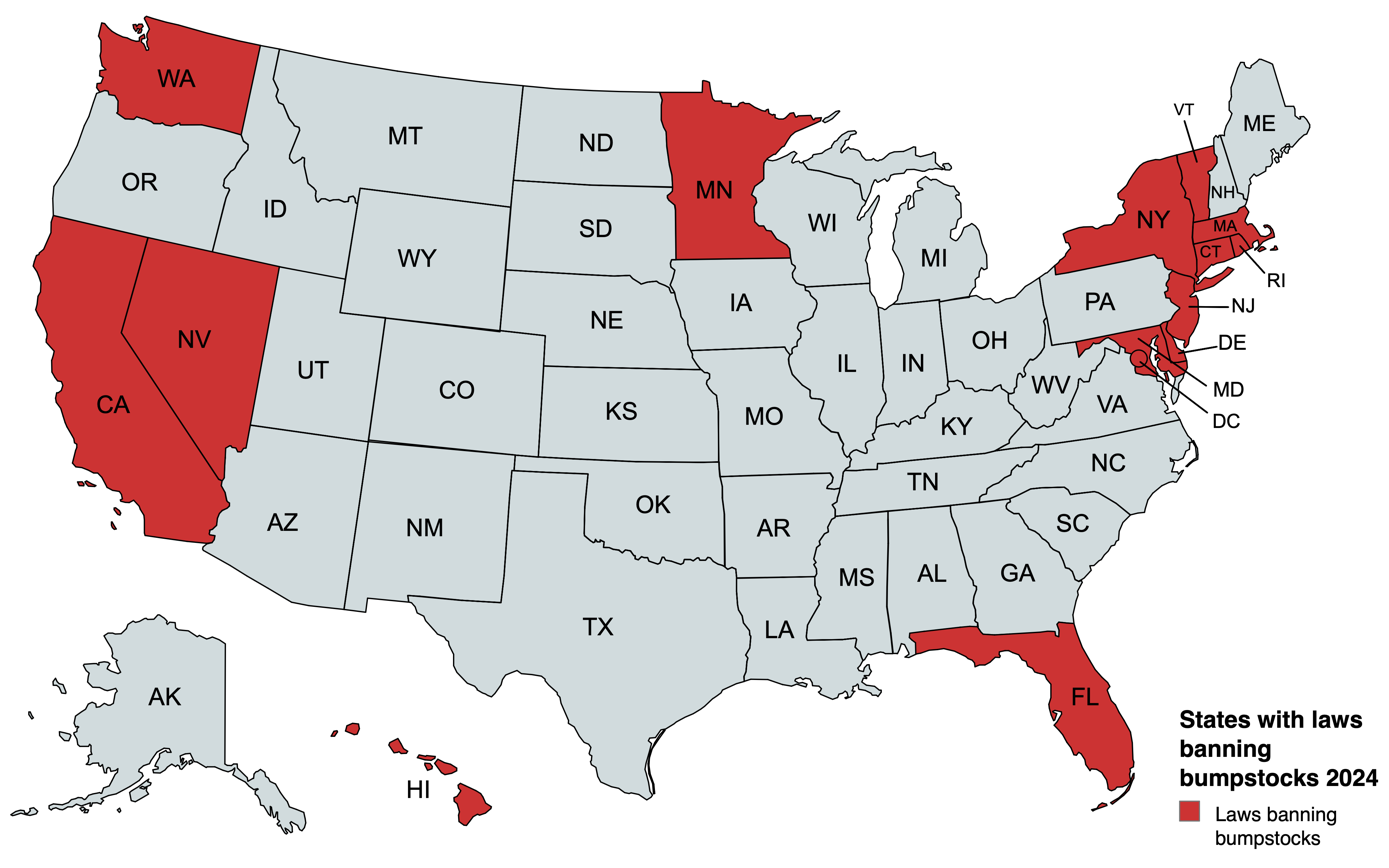
States banning bump stocks in 2024

Bump stocks are banned in California, Connecticut, DC, Delaware, Florida, Hawaii, Maryland, Massachusetts, Minnesota, Nevada, New Jersey, New York, Rhode Island, Vermont, and Washington, according to Everytown for Gun Safety as of June 14, 2024.

== History of regulation ==
=== United States ===
In 2002, one of the first bump stock-type devices, the Akins Accelerator invented by Bill Akins, was deemed by the US Bureau of Alcohol, Tobacco, Firearms and Explosives (ATF) to not be a "machine gun". The Akins Accelerator used an internal spring to force the firearm forward to re-make contact with the trigger finger after the recoil of the previous shot pushed the firearm rearward. The ATF interpreted a "single function of the trigger" to mean a "single movement of the trigger", and since the trigger moved for each shot, the Akins Accelerator was deemed to not be a machine gun. Later, in 2006, the ATF reversed course and reinterpreted the language to mean "single pull of the trigger", which reclassified the Akins Accelerator as a machine gun. The Eleventh Circuit Court of Appeals upheld the new interpretation in February 2009.

More modern bump stocks were invented by Slide Fire Solutions founder Jeremiah Cottle as a replacement stock for people who have limited hand mobility. Such bump stocks have no internal spring and require the shooter to use their support hand to maintain constant forward pressure on the front of the rifle in order to achieve continuous fire. Between 2008 and 2017, the ATF issued ten letter rulings that classified bump stocks as a "firearm part", which are unregulated. However, in March 2018, as a result of the use of bump stocks in the 2017 Las Vegas shooting, at the request of President Trump through executive order, the U.S. Department of Justice announced a plan to reclassify bump stocks as "machine guns" under existing federal law, effectively (Note: Machineguns manufactured after May 1986 are illegal on the federal level, but pre-1986 ones remain legal in most states and are highly regulated. Since bump stocks were not invented until 2010, all existing supplies effectively become illegal if classified as a machinegun.) banning them nationwide. Only two states had banned bump stocks prior to the Las Vegas shooting. The final rule of the DoJ was issued on December 18, 2018.

Bump stocks remained illegal for nearly all US civilians until the regulation was struck down on June 14, 2024, by the U.S. Supreme Court decision in Garland v. Cargill.

==== Public opinion ====
Immediately following the 2017 Las Vegas shooting, 72% of registered voters supported a bump stock ban, including 68% of Republicans and 79% of Democrats, according to a Morning Consult poll. After the Parkland shooting, a 2018 NPR/Ipsos poll found that 81% of American adults supported and 62% strongly favored banning bump stocks with a margin of error of ±3.5 percentage points. Another poll, by CBS News, around the same time, found that 56% of American adults supported banning bump stocks with a margin of error of ±4 percentage points.

==== 2018 Final Rule ====
The ATF ruled in 2010 that bump stocks were not a firearm subject to regulation and allowed their sale as an unregulated firearm part. In the 2017 Las Vegas shooting, twelve bump stocks were found at the scene. The National Rifle Association stated on October 5, 2017, "Devices designed to allow semi-automatic rifles to function like fully-automatic rifles should be subject to additional regulations", and called on regulators to "immediately review whether these devices comply with federal law". The 2017 shooting generated bipartisan interest in regulating bump stocks. On October 4, 2017, Senator Dianne Feinstein introduced a bill to ban bump stocks, but it was not acted upon. Instead, on February 20, 2018, six days after the Parkland shooting, President Trump instructed the ATF to issue regulations to treat bump stocks as machine guns.

President Donald Trump blamed former President Barack Obama for having "legalized bump stocks", which he termed a "BAD IDEA", a claim which was found to be partly erroneous by USA Today, with an ATF official involved in the decision saying neither Obama nor then-Attorney General Eric Holder advised the agency on its ruling and a constitutional law professor explaining that the administration did not possess the legal authority to ban the sale of the devices. On March 23, 2018, at President Trump's request the Department of Justice announced a plan to ban bump stocks at the federal level. The proposed change would reclassify bump stocks as "machine guns" and effectively ban the devices in the United States under existing federal law. A notice of proposed rulemaking was issued by the ATF on March 29, 2018, and opened for public comments. Over 119,000 comments were submitted in support of the proposed rule, while over 66,000 comments expressed opposition to it. On December 18, 2018, the final regulation to ban bump stocks was issued by the Department of Justice and published in the Federal Register on December 26. The final rule stated that "bump-stock-type devices" are covered by the Gun Control Act, as amended under the Hughes Amendment, which with limited exceptions, makes it unlawful for any person to transfer or possess a machine gun unless it was lawfully possessed prior to 1986. Since the bump-stock-type devices covered by this final rule were not in existence prior to 1986, they would be prohibited when the rule becomes effective. The ban went into effect on March 26, 2019, by which owners of bump stocks were required to destroy or surrender them to the ATF, punishable by up to a $250,000 fine and/or prison sentences of up to ten years.

A Freedom of Information Act Request by YouTuber "CheapShot" revealed the ATF received 582 abandoned bump stocks and 98 retained for evidence, out of an estimated 220,000 - 520,000 in circulation.

==== 2024 vacating of the 2018 Final Rule ====
On June 14, 2024, the 2018 final rule by the Bureau of Alcohol, Tobacco, Firearms and Explosives was vacated by the Supreme Court of the United States in the decision for Garland v. Cargill (2024). In that decision, Associate Justice Clarence Thomas, writing for the six member majority, stated the 2018 final rule exceeded the ATF's statutory authority under the National Firearms Act of 1934 as a bump stock does not satisfy the Act's definition of machine gun.

==== State ====
Prior to the federal ban effective March 26, 2019, some states had taken action on their own to restrict ownership of the accessory. Since 1990, the sale of bump stocks has been illegal in California. They were banned in New York with the passage of the NY SAFE Act in 2013, and more explicitly banned in early 2019. The device's legal status is unclear in Connecticut, Michigan, Minnesota, and Puerto Rico.

===== After the 2017 Las Vegas shooting =====
In his final day as governor in January 2018, New Jersey Governor Chris Christie signed legislation making the gun accessory illegal in New Jersey. Massachusetts banned bump stocks after the 2017 Las Vegas shooting.

In March 2018, following the Parkland high school shooting, Florida enacted SB 7026, which, among other things, banned bump stocks. The portion of the legislation banning bump stocks took effect in October 2018; possession in Florida is a third-degree felony. Vermont passed a similar law in 2018, which went into effect in October 2018; possession in Vermont is a misdemeanor. Delaware, Hawaii, Maryland, Washington, Washington D.C., and Nevada have also banned bump stocks.

Some states that do not ban bump stocks may have localities that ban them, such as Northbrook, Illinois (April 2018); Boulder, Colorado (May 2018); and others.

=== United Kingdom ===
In May 2019, the Offensive Weapons Act 2019 prohibited bump stocks in the UK.

=== Australia ===
In November 2019, the importation of bump stocks was banned in Australia.

== Federal lawsuits ==
Several gun rights groups have challenged the federal regulation.

=== Cargill (Supreme Court) ===
An Austin, Texas firearms store owner, Michael Cargill, sued ATF in 2019, in the U.S. District Court for the Western District of Texas, similarly challenging the authority of the agency to classify bump stocks as illegal machine guns. Cargill is also represented by the New Civil Liberties Alliance. The district court dismissed the suit in November 2020. On 14 December 2021, a unanimous three-judge panel on the U.S. Court of Appeals for the Fifth Circuit upheld the ban. On 23 June 2022, the court reversed the panel decision and took the case en banc. Oral argument was heard on 12 September 2022. On 6 January 2023, the court's full panel ruled that bump stocks are not machine guns and reversed the district court.

On June 14, 2024, upon appeal before the Supreme Court of the United States, the 2018 final rule was vacated in a 6–3 decision.

=== Other Administrative Procedure Act lawsuits ===
==== Gun Owners of America (Sixth Circuit) ====
In December 2018, Gun Owners of America sued the federal government in the U.S. District Court for the Western District of Michigan, challenging the bump stock ban. On 21 March 2019, the group's request for a preliminary injunction was denied by the district court. The U.S. Court of Appeals for the Sixth Circuit and U.S. Supreme Court both denied a stay on the effective date of the regulation pending the appeal.

Following oral argument in December 2020, the Sixth Circuit panel issued a 2–1 ruling in favor of the plaintiffs on 25 March 2021. The majority decision, written by Judge Alice M. Batchelder and joined by Judge Eric E. Murphy, ruled that (1) an agency's interpretation of a criminal statute is not entitled to Chevron deference, (2) bump stocks cannot be classified as machineguns, thus the ATF's rule is not the best interpretation of the law, and (3) the plaintiffs are likely to prevail in their challenge, therefore the district court should have granted an injunction. The court remanded the case back to the district court for proceedings in accordance with its opinion (i.e., to issue an injunction). Judge Helene White dissented, writing that the Supreme Court had previously applied Chevron deference to agency interpretations of criminal statutes in the cases of Babbitt v. Sweet Home Chapter of Communities for a Great Oregon and United States v. O'Hagan. The appeals court granted an en banc petition on 25 June 2021 and heard oral argument in October 2021. On 3 December 2021, the court issued an 8–8 split decision, thus leaving the district court's denial of a preliminary injunction in place. The Supreme Court declined to hear the case on 3 October 2022.

==== Firearms Policy Coalition (D.C. Circuit) ====
The Firearms Policy Coalition and other gun-rights groups sued in the federal district court in Washington, D.C., also seeking an injunction. In February 2019, U.S. District Judge Dabney L. Friedrich denied the Firearms Policy Coalition's request for an injunction, determining that the group had not put forward convincing legal arguments that the ban was invalid. The U.S. Court of Appeals for the D.C. Circuit stayed the effective date of the regulation, but only as applied to the plaintiffs and their members. A broader injunction was denied by the Supreme Court.

On 1 April 2019, the D.C. Circuit affirmed the district court's denial of a preliminary injunction in a per curiam decision, based largely on Chevron deference. The decision allowed the ban to go into effect for the plaintiffs. Judge Karen L. Henderson issued an opinion concurring in part and dissenting in part. A second stay application was denied by the Supreme Court on 5 April 2019, with Thomas and Gorsuch indicating that they would have granted the application. The Supreme Court denied a petition for a writ of certiorari (petition for review) on 2 March 2020; Gorsuch issued a statement agreeing that the time was not right for Supreme Court review, but criticizing the D.C. Circuit's position and writing that "Chevron's application in this case may be doubtful."

The case then returned to the district court on the merits, and in February 2021, the court granted summary judgment in favor of the government, holding that Chevron deference applied; that ATF had the authority to state that the NFA's definition of "machinegun" includes bump stocks; and that ATF's interpretation of the statutory language was reasonable. The court also rejected the plaintiffs' Taking Clause and ex post facto clause claims, as well as their claim that the underlying statutes were impermissibly vague. On 9 August 2022, the D.C. Circuit Court of Appeals upheld the ban by reasoning that it was the best reading of the law without applying Chevron deference. A petition for an en banc rehearing was denied on 2 May 2023. The case is pending before the Supreme Court.

==== Aposhian (Tenth Circuit) ====
In 2019, W. Clark Aposhian, the chairman of the Utah Shooting Sports Council, a gun rights group, sued the ATF in the federal district court of Utah over the bump stock ban, arguing that the promulgation of the regulation exceeded the ATF's statutory authority. Aposhian is represented by the New Civil Liberties Alliance. The district court denied the plaintiffs' request for a preliminary injunction to block the ban in March 2019. In March 2019, the U.S. Court of Appeals for the Tenth Circuit granted a temporary stay that applies only to the plaintiff, but ultimately upheld the denial of a preliminary injunction. In April 2019, in a divided opinion, the Tenth Circuit denied the motion for a stay, and a divided panel upheld the district court's ruling. The appeals court granted review en banc (i.e., by the full court), but ultimately dismissed the grant of en banc rehearing as improvidently granted, allowing the panel decision (and thus the bump-stock ban) to stay in place. The Supreme Court declined to hear the case on 3 October 2022. On 29 September 2023, the district court upheld the rule under Chevron deference.

=== Takings Clause lawsuits ===
==== Maryland Shall Issue (Fourth Circuit) ====
In June 2018, the group Maryland Shall Issue filed a putative class action lawsuit in the federal district court in Maryland, challenged 2018 Maryland Senate Bill 707 which banned "rapid-fire trigger activators"; the plaintiffs alleged that the ban was an unconstitutional taking requiring just compensation, among other challenges. In November 2018, the district court dismissed the case. In June 2020, the U.S. Court of Appeals for the Fourth Circuit affirmed the dismissal of the suit in a 2–1 vote. In May 2021, the Supreme Court declined to hear the case.

==== Federal claims lawsuits (C.F.C.) ====
Two similar lawsuits were filed in the United States Court of Federal Claims challenging the federal bump-stock ban—one filed by bump stock owners (McCutchen), the other by bump-stock suppliers (Modern Sportsman and RW Arms). Both were dismissed. In the latter case, the court held that the ATF Final Rule banning bump stocks "was promulgated pursuant to the police power to protect public safety and therefore not a compensable taking under the Fifth Amendment." Both cases were unsuccessfully appealed to the Court of Appeals for the Federal Circuit. En banc petitions were denied and the Supreme Court denied review.

==== Lane (N.D. of Texas) ====
In Lane v. United States, a putative class action filed in the Northern District of Texas, the plaintiff challenges the federal bump-stock ban as an unconstitutional taking under the Fifth Amendment. After initially denying the government’s motion to dismiss without prejudice, the district court later dismissed Lane’s illegal-exaction claim but allowed the takings claim to proceed. Following the U.S. Supreme Court’s 2024 decision in Garland v. Cargill, which invalidated the ATF’s bump-stock rule as exceeding statutory authority, the court has continued to address the case rather than maintaining a stay, and the Fifth Amendment takings claim remains pending.

=== Miscellaneous lawsuits ===
==== Hardin (Sixth Circuit) ====
Another challenge, filed in the District Court for the Western District of Kentucky, was unsuccessful. The Sixth Circuit Court of Appeals heard the case on 19 January 2023, and ruled on 25 April 2023, that bump stocks are not machineguns.

==== Doe (Federal Circuit) ====
A class action lawsuit filed in the U.S. District Court for the Southern District of Illinois seeking immunity for legal purchasers of bump stocks prior to the ATF rule change was denied by the court in June 2020. On 31 October 2022, the United States Court of Appeals for the Federal Circuit upheld the ban.

==== Kalzahg (N.M.C.C.A.) ====
The Navy-Marine Corps Court of Criminal Appeals ruled on 7 September 2021, that a bump stock does not fall under the definition of a machinegun. The ruling was not appealed by the government.

== State lawsuits ==
=== Florida ===
Florida banned bump stocks in October 2018. A class action lawsuit challenging the ban as an unconstitutional taking requiring just compensation was unsuccessful in the Leon County circuit court in May 2019 and in the 1st District Court of Appeal in January 2021.

== Patent infringement suit ==
Slide Fire Solutions filed suit against Bump Fire Systems for infringement of its patents on bump stock designs in 2014. The suit alleged that Bump Fire Systems infringed eight US Patents, for example, United States Patent No. 6,101,918 entitled "Method And Apparatus for Accelerating the Cyclic Firing Rate of a Semi-Automatic Firearm" and United States Patent No. 8,127,658 entitled "Method of Shooting a Semi-Automatic Firearm". The suit was settled in 2016, resulting in Bump Fire Systems ceasing manufacture of the product in contention.

== Other lawsuits ==
Survivors of the 2017 Las Vegas shooting sued bump stock patent holder and manufacturer Slide Fire Solutions, claiming the company was negligent and that they deliberately attempted to evade U.S. laws regulating automatic weapons: "this horrific assault would not and could not have occurred, with a conventional handgun, rifle, or shotgun, of the sort used by law-abiding responsible gun owners for hunting or self defense." The suit was dismissed in September 2018; the court determined that the bump stocks of the sort used by gunman Stephen Paddock to commit the murders, were "firearm components" rather than "firearm accessories" and were therefore subject to the Protection of Lawful Commerce in Arms Act (PLCAA), a federal law immunizing manufacturers and sellers of firearms from liability for harm "caused by those who criminally or unlawfully misuse firearm products".

== See also ==
- Glock switch
- Gun politics in the United States
- Hell-fire trigger
- Recoil operation
- Binary trigger
- Trigger crank
- Forced reset trigger
- Slamfire
