= Red herring prospectus =

Document submitted by a company (issuer) as part of a public offering of securities

A red herring prospectus, as a first or preliminary prospectus, is a document submitted by a company (issuer) as part of a public offering of securities (either company shares or bonds). Most frequently associated with an initial public offering (IPO), this document, like the previously submitted Form S-1 registration statement, must be filed with the Securities and Exchange Commission (SEC).

A red herring prospectus is issued to potential investors, but does not have complete particulars on the price of the securities offered and quantum of securities to be issued. The front page of the prospectus displays a bold red disclaimer stating that information in the prospectus is not complete and may be changed, and that the securities may not be sold until the registration statement, filed with the market regulator, is effective. Potential investors may not place buy orders for the security, based solely on the information contained within the preliminary prospectus. Those investors may, however, express an "indication of interest" in the offering, provided that they have received a copy of the red herring at least 72 hours prior to the public sale. After the registration statement becomes effective, and the stock is offered to the public, indications of interest may be converted to purchase orders, at the buyer's discretion. The final prospectus must then be promptly delivered to the buyer.

== Contents ==
"Red-herring prospectus" means a prospectus that does not have complete particulars on the price of the securities offered and quantum of securities offered. The red herring statement contains:

1. purpose of the issue;
2. disclosure of any option agreement;
3. underwriter's commissions and discounts;
4. promotion expenses;
5. net proceeds to the issuing company (issuer);
6. balance sheet;
7. earnings statements for last 3 years, if available;
8. names and address of all officers, directors, underwriters and stockholders owning 10% or more of the current outstanding stock;
9. copy of the underwriting agreement;
10. legal opinion on the issue;
11. copies of the articles of incorporation of the issuer.

== Prospectus ==
Since the registration statement (SEC Form S-1) is a very lengthy and complex document, the Securities Act of 1933 requires the preparation of a shorter document, known as a prospectus, for investors to read. The Preliminary (or Red Herring) Prospectus is distributed during the quiet period, before the registration statement has become effective with the Securities and Exchange Commission (SEC). Upon the registration becoming effective, a "Final Prospectus" is prepared and distributed which includes the final public offering price and the number of shares issued. Only then, can the public offering of shares be completed.

== Name ==
The name "Red Herring" relates to the red lettered disclaimer displayed on the front page of each preliminary prospectus. That disclaimer contains information similar to the following:

A Registration Statement relating to these securities has been filed with the Securities and Exchange Commission but has not yet become effective. Information contained herein is subject to completion or amendment. These securities may not be sold nor may offers to buy be accepted prior to the time the Registration Statement becomes effective.

The wording can be, and usually is, slightly different with each individual filing. An example is the 2012 Facebook prospectus.

== Registration ==
The minimum period between the filing of a Registration and its effective date is 20 days, called the "cooling-off period." The SEC can deem the registration "deficient" in which case registration does not become effective until the deficiencies are corrected. The SEC does not approve the securities registered with it, does not pass on the investment merits, nor guarantee the accuracy of the statements within the registration statement or prospectus. The SEC merely attempts to make certain that all pertinent information is disclosed.
