= Bought out deal =

Method offering securities to the public through a sponsor

A bought out deal is a method of offering company shares to the general public through a sponsor or underwriter (a bank, financial institution, or an individual). The securities are listed in one or more stock exchanges within a time frame mutually agreed upon by the company and the sponsor. This option saves the issuing company the costs and time involved in a public issue. The cost of holding the shares can be reimbursed by the company, or the sponsor can offer the shares to the public at a premium to earn profits. Terms are agreed upon by the company

The Securities and Exchange Board of India mandates that only private companies can choose this method of issuing securities.

== Features ==
- Parties – There are three parties involved in a bought out deal; the promoters of the company, sponsors & co-sponsors who are generally merchant bankers and investors
- Outright sale – There is an outright sale of a chunk of equity shares to a single sponsor or a lead sponsor
- Syndicate – The sponsor forms a syndicate for management of resources required & distribution of risk
- Sale Price – The sale price is finalized through negotiations between the issuing company & the purchaser which is influenced by reputation of the promoters, project evaluation, prevailing market sentiment, prospects of off-loading these shares at a future date, etc.
- Fund base – The bought out deals are fund based activities where funds of merchant bankers get locked in for at least the prescribed minimum period.
- Listing – The listing generally takes place at a time when company is performing well in terms of profits & liquidity.

== Advantages and disadvantages ==
=== Advantages ===
- Speedy sale – The bought out deals offer a mechanism for speedy sale of securities involving lower issuing cost.
- Freedom – The bought out deals offer freedom for promoters to set a realistic price & negotiate the same with the sponsor.
- Investor protection – The bought out deals facilitates better investor protection as the sponsors are rigorously evaluated and appraised by the promoters before off-loading the issue
- Quality offer – The bought out deals help in improving the quality of capital flotation and primary market offering.

=== Disadvantages ===
- Sponsors may take control of the company as they own large number of shares.
- When markets are down sponsors may incur losses.
- The risk of market manipulation by the sponsor such as insider trading is high.
- Sponsors can make large profits at the expense of small investors.

== See also ==
- Bought deal
- Private placement
- Underwriting contract
- Underwriter
