= Cooling-off period =

Cooling-off period may refer to:

- 30-day cooling off period, a mediation or conciliation period required by law or contract before strike or lockout can go into effect
- Cooling-off period (consumer rights), a period of time during which the purchaser may cancel a purchase
- Quiet period, the time which a company making an IPO must be silent about it, so as not to inflate the value of the stock artificially
- Standstill period, the time to allow unsuccessful bidders to challenge the decision before a contract is signed
- Waiting period, in the U.S., a required time between buying a firearm and obtaining it
- in anger management, a period of time where parties in disagreement do not communicate with each other
- a period of time after the termination of a worker's employment in which they are prohibited from obtaining employment with competing entities, see non-compete clause
- in the nuclear power industry, the length of time that spent nuclear fuel must be stored in water before enough heat is dissipated so that the waste product can be safely reprocessed or transported
- the defining difference between a spree killer and a serial killer
