= Bought deal =

Financial underwriting contract

A bought deal is financial underwriting contract often associated with an initial public offering or public offering. It occurs when an underwriter, such as an investment bank or a syndicate, purchases securities from an issuer before a preliminary prospectus is filed. The underwriter acts as principal rather than agent and thus actually "goes long" in the security. The bank negotiates a price with the issuer (usually at a discount to the current market price, if applicable).

The advantage of the bought deal from the issuer's perspective is that they do not have to worry about financing risk (the risk that the financing can only be done at a discount too steep to market price.) This is in contrast to a book building or fully marketed deal, where the underwriters have to "market" the offering to prospective buyers, only after which the price is set.

== Advantages and disadvantages ==
The advantages of the bought deal from the underwriter's perspective include:

1. Bought deals are usually priced at a larger discount to market than fully marketed deals, and thus may be easier to sell; and
2. The issuer/client may only be willing to do a deal if it is bought (as it eliminates execution or market risk.)

The disadvantage of the bought deal from the underwriter's perspective is that if it cannot sell the securities, it must hold them. This is usually the result of the market price falling below the issue price, which means the underwriter loses money. The underwriter also uses up its capital, which would probably otherwise be put to better use (given sell-side investment banks are not usually in the business of buying new issues of securities).

== See also ==
- Bought out deal
- Private placement
