= Regulation S-K =

Prescribed regulation under the US Securities Act of 1933

Regulation S-K is a prescribed regulation under the US Securities Act of 1933 that lays out reporting requirements for various SEC filings used by public companies. Companies are also often called issuers (issuing or contemplating issuing shares), filers (entities that must file reports with the SEC) or registrants (entities that must register (usually shares) with the SEC).

Regulation S-K is generally focused on qualitative descriptions while the related Regulation S-X focuses on financial statements.

== Applicability ==
In a company's history, Regulation S-K first applies with the Form S-1 that companies use to register their securities with the U.S. Securities and Exchange Commission (SEC) as the "registration statement under the Securities Act of 1933". Thereafter, Regulation S-K applies to the ongoing reporting requirements in documents such as forms 10-K and 8-K.

Regulation S-K applies to:

- registration statements under the Securities Act to the extent provided in the forms to be used for registration under that Act;
- registration statements under section 12 of the Securities Exchange Act of 1934, also known as subpart C of part 249 of this chapter (17 CFR Part 229);
- annual or other reports under sections 13 and 15(d);
- going-private transaction statements under section 13;
- tender offer statements under sections 13 and 14;
- annual reports to security holders and proxy and information statements under section 14; and
- any other documents required to be filed under the Exchange Act, to the extent provided in the forms and rules under that Act.

A public company is initially impacted by Regulation S-K with its IPO (initial public offering of shares). Form S-1 contains the basic business and financial information on an issuer with respect to a specific securities offering. Investors may use the prospectus to consider the merits of an offering and make educated investment decisions. A prospectus is one of the main documents used by an investor to research a company prior to an initial public offering.

Form S-1 has an OMB approval number of 3235–0065 and the online form is only 8 pages. However, the simplicity of the form's design is belied by the OMB Office's figure of the estimated average burden – 972 hours. "SEC Form S-1" (PDF).

Regulation S-K (the "K" can be thought of as a reporting classification as for Form 10-K) cannot be considered in a vacuum, and indeed all the securities regulations and associated law may form a very large body of information. Professionals in the field of securities compliance reporting will need to be aware of other rules and regulations as noted at the Division of Corporation Finance.

== Rules, regulations, and schedules commonly associated with Regulation S-K ==
- Regulation S-X [17 CFR Part 210]: Form and content of and requirements for financial statements
- Regulation M-A [17 CFR 229.1000 – 229.1016]: Mergers and acquisitions
- Regulation AB [17 CFR 229.1100 – 229.1123]: Asset-backed securities
- Industry Guides: Securities Act and Exchange Act Industry Guides
- General Rules and Regulations from the Securities Act of 1933 [17 CFR Part 230]
- Rule 144 [17 CFR 230.144]: Defines persons legally deemed not to be engaged in a distribution and therefore not treated as underwriters
- Regulation C [17 CFR 230.401 – 230.498]: Registration and filing requirements
- Regulation D [17 CFR 230.501 – 230.508]: Rules for limited offer and sale of securities without registration
- Regulation S [17 CFR 230.901 – 230.905]: Rules governing offers and sales made outside the United States

== Regulation S-K: Highlights by item ==
=== Item 10: General ===
Item 10 suggests management make reasonable projections for the future. Security ratings are voluntarily permitted for classes of debt securities, convertible debt securities, and preferred stock. Incorporation by reference is defined; no piggy-back referencing (no reference to a reference in another filed document) is allowed. Non-GAAP financial measures are discouraged. Smaller companies are allowed to only fill in items 101, 201, 301, 302, 303, 305, 402, 404, 407, 503, 504, and 601.

=== Business ===
==== Item 101: Description of Business ====
The initial portion of this information is relatively simple – e.g., incorporation and address – but item 101 then asks for how the company is doing in its various industry segments and a thorough description of both the company's current business and how it intends to do business in future. These requirements provide transparency to the company's investors and may provide information relevant to competitors. Some requirements for reports to shareholders are also stated.

==== Item 102: Description of Property ====
This section requires disclosure of information on physical property, such as land, buildings such as plants, mines, oil, and gas reserves; this requirement has likewise been criticized, by some commenters to the December 12, 2007 concept release for potentially assisting a company's competitors. Industry Guides sometimes indicate what must be disclosed.

==== Item 103: Legal Proceedings ====
This section requires disclosure of any material pending legal proceedings (other than ordinary routine litigation incidental to the business, such as lawsuits against an insurance company's customers) to which the registrant or any of its subsidiaries is a party or of which any of their property is the subject; this especially includes "environmental actions" and any (other) proceedings known to be under contemplation by governmental authorities. This section must include a description of the factual basis alleged to underlie the proceedings and the court action(s) sought.

==== Item 104: Mine Safety Disclosure ====
This section requires disclosure of certain information pertaining to mine operations, if the registrant operates mines.

==== Item 105: Risk Factors ====
This section requires disclosure of the material factors that make an investment in the registrant or offering speculative or risky. The risk factors must be written in plain english and organized logically with relevant headings. Registrants are discouraged from presenting risks that could apply generically to any registrant. Instead, registrants must concisely explain how each risk affects the registrant or the securities being offered.

=== Securities of the registrant ===
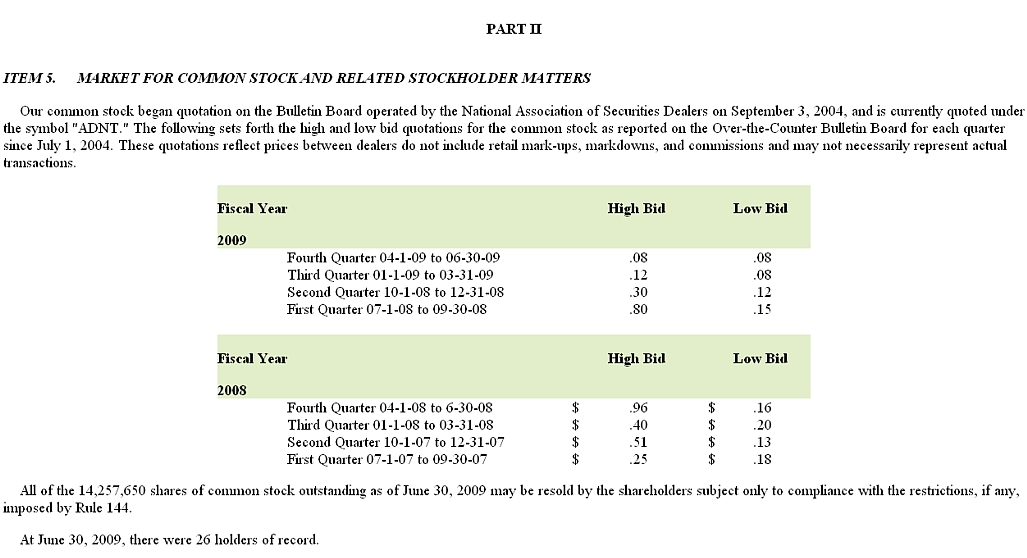
Sample Market for Common Stock and Related Stockholder Matters

==== Item 201: Market Price of and Dividends on the Registrant's Common Equity and Related Stockholder Matters ====
While this information is usually available through Internet search engines, it must still be disclosed in detail. This disclosure is especially important for smaller companies whose stocks trade infrequently and for companies trading on multiple markets (including more than one market per type of common stock). The number of shareholders and all holders of five percent or more of shares must be revealed.

Dividend history and intent to pay or not pay dividends must be discussed. Securities authorized for issuance under equity compensation plans must be revealed; this also involves Regulation S-X. A performance graph that shows the "yearly percentage change in the registrant's cumulative total shareholder return on a class of common stock" is required. Figures must also be compared with one or more "peer issuer(s) selected in good faith".

==== Item 202: Description of Registrant's Securities ====
This section involves describing different share classes and any provisions of the registrant's charter or by-laws that affect them, such as any clauses that may act as a "poison pill". In addition, such factors as liability of shares to foreign tax must be disclosed.

=== Financial information ===
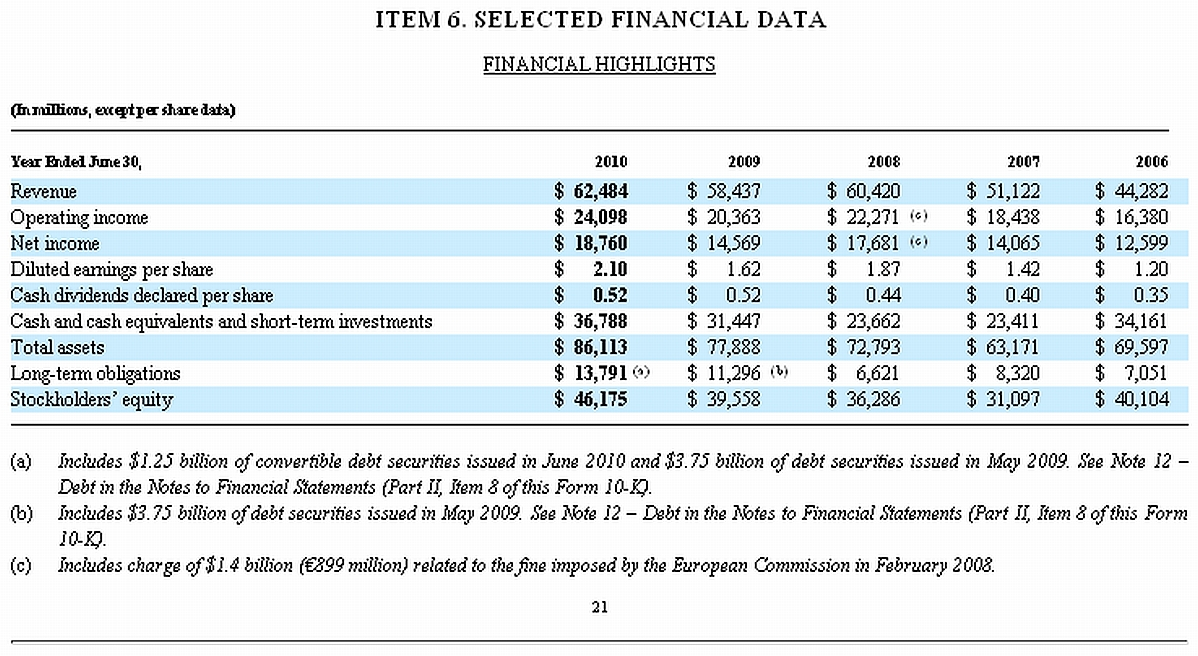
Sample Item 6 of Form 10-K

==== Item 301: Selected Financial Data ====
This item asks for selected financial data to be presented, in a comparative columnar form, for each of the last five fiscal years and any additional fiscal years necessary to prevent the information from being misleading. Such financial data should include net sales or operating revenues, income (loss) from continuing operations, income (loss) from continuing operations per common share, total assets, long-term obligations and redeemable preferred stock, and cash dividends declared per common share. The financial data can also include any additional items that would help with understanding the financial condition and results of operations.

==== Item 302: Supplementary Financial Information ====
Regarding quarterly financial data, this item looks for changes caused by such events as: disposals of business segments; extraordinary, unusual or infrequently occurring items; and matters related to gas and oil. Regulation S-X is relevant to this item.

==== Item 303: Management's discussion and analysis (MD&A) of financial condition and results of operations ====
Item 303 requires a narrative explanation of any changes in the financial condition or results of operation of a company. The SEC expects that the MD&A meaningfully reflects the results of operations, liquidity, capital resources, and the impact of inflation. Its objectives are: to provide in one section of a filing, material historical and prospective textual disclosure enabling investors and others to assess the financial condition and result of operations of the registrant, with particular emphasis on the registrant's prospects for the future. Because the registrant must disclose a known trend or uncertainty that would likely have a material effect on the registrant's financial condition or result of operations, the MD&A should include management's identification and evaluation of the information important to providing investors and others an accurate understanding of the company's current and prospective financial position and operating results. Per Regulation S-K, in the MD&A companies are required to disclose any known trends, events, or uncertainties that are "reasonably likely to result in a registrant's liquidity increasing or decreasing in a material way".

This section can be lengthy. E.g., in Google, Inc.'s 2009 10-K filing, the "Management's discussion and analysis of financial condition and results of operations" section was 20 pages long.

==== Item 304: Changes In and Disagreements With Accountants on Accounting and Financial Disclosure ====
This item highlights any disagreements between the company and its auditors and accountants. Such disagreements can cause difficulties with the validity of financial statements and with Regulation S-X, so are rarely reported under this item.

==== Item 305: Quantitative and Qualitative Disclosures about Market Risk ====
Companies are given a choice of three disclosure alternatives:

1. Tabular presentation of information related to market risk sensitive instruments;
2. Sensitivity analysis of potential loss in future earnings, fair values, or cash flows of market risk sensitive instruments; or
3. Value-at-risk disclosures of the potential loss in future earnings, fair values, or cash flows of market risk sensitive instruments from relevant market rates or prices.

This disclosure may be done either mathematically or with a narrative explanation within, for instance, the company's Annual Report.

==== Item 307: Disclosure Controls and Procedures ====
This extremely brief item asks "Disclose the conclusions of the registrant's principal executive and principal financial officers ... regarding the effectiveness of the registrant's disclosure controls and procedures ... as of the end of the period covered by the report, based on the evaluation of these controls and procedures". Despite its brevity, this item requires significant auditing and other work.

==== Item 308: Internal Control over Financial Reporting ====
As directed by Section 404 of the Sarbanes-Oxley Act of 2002, the SEC adopted the rule that is now Item 308, requiring subject companies to include in their annual reports a report of management on the company's internal control over financial reporting. The internal control report must include:

- A statement of management's responsibility for establishing and maintaining adequate internal control over financial reporting for the company;
- Management's assessment of the effectiveness of the company's internal control over financial reporting as of the end of the company's most recent fiscal year;
- A statement identifying the framework used by management to evaluate the effectiveness of the company's internal control over financial reporting; and
- A statement that the registered public accounting firm that audited the company's financial statements included in the annual report has issued an attestation report on management's assessment of the company's internal control over financial reporting. This attestation report must likewise be filed as part of the annual report, and management must make certifications required by Sections 302 and 906 of the Sarbanes-Oxley Act.

=== Management and "Certain Security Holders" ===
==== Item 401: Directors, Executive Officers, Promoters and Control Persons ====
This item indicates who is running the company and what financial stake they have in it. Also required to be disclosed are relationships such as family members; significant employees who are not directors or officers; backgrounds and experience in business of all parties; other directorships; and promoters and control persons.

==== Item 402: Executive Compensation ====
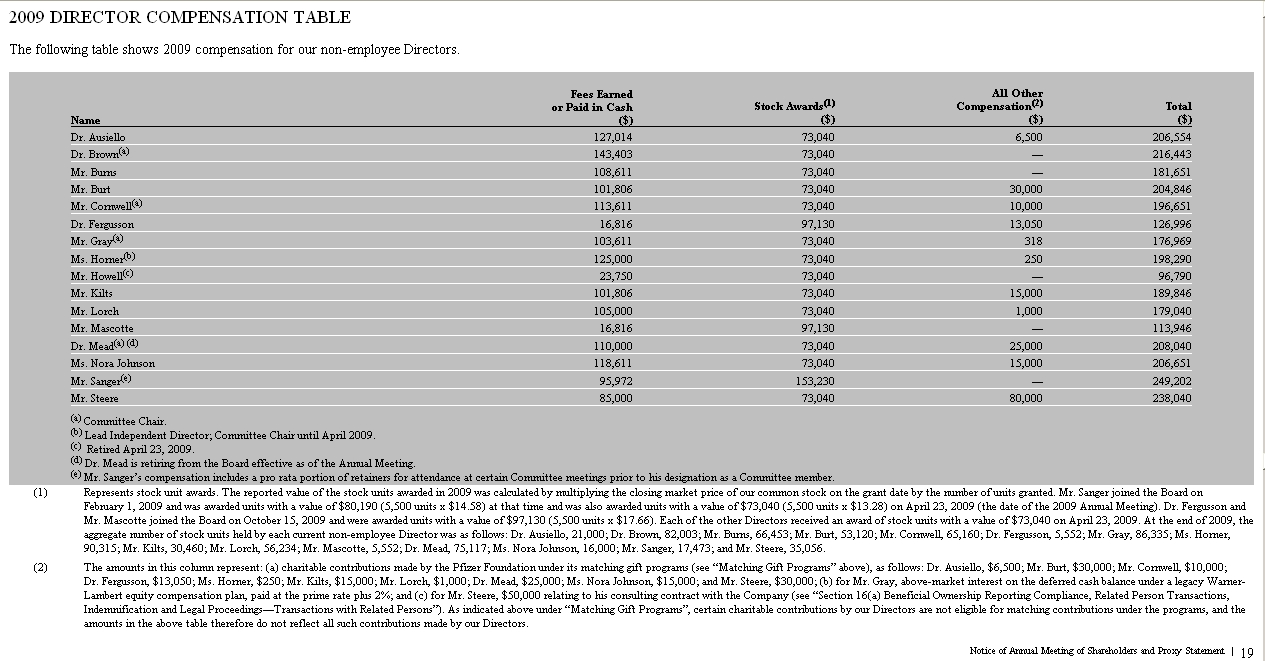
Sample 2009 Compensation Report

While this disclosure is required in Form 10-K, it is often performed in the Annual Report and incorporated by reference in Form 10-K by large companies such as Pfizer.

==== Item 403: Security Ownership of Certain Beneficial Owners and Management ====
The company must carefully furnish, to the very best of its knowledge, information about major shareholders in tabular format, as of the most recent practicable date, with respect to any person or "group" (see section 13(d)(3) of the Exchange Act for the definition of a "group") who is the beneficial owner of more than five percent of any class of the registrant's voting securities, the total number of shares beneficially owned and the amount the owner has the right to acquire, plus the address of each person or entity. This information may be found in form 10-K or in other places referred to in that form, such as the proxy statement; the latter is, like form 10-K, filed with the SEC's EDGAR system, entitled "DEF 14 A (Definitive Proxy Statement)".

==== Item 404: Transactions with Related Persons, Promoters and Certain Control Persons ====
This item requires the disclosure of any conflicts or potential conflicts of interests, with a cut-off lower limit of $US120,000. What is required to be disclosed includes "any other information regarding the transaction or the related person in the context of the transaction that is material to investors in light of the circumstances of the particular transaction." The parties in question include multiple possible parties, such as directors, nominees for directorship, relatives, and all entities with indirect interests.

==== Item 405: Compliance with Section 16(a) of the Exchange Act ====
Under Section 16 of the Securities Exchange Act of 1934 directors, officers, and principal stockholders must file reports and must do so within certain time deadlines. Item 405 requires the company to examine these filings and, if any were late, to reveal this in a report in this section.

==== Item 406: Code of ethics ====
A company need not have a code of ethics; however, if they do not, they are required to explain why not, and most publicly traded companies have such a code. If the company has a website then the code must be on it, although not necessarily on the front page.

==== Item 407: Corporate Governance ====
This has seven clauses:

1. Director independence
2. Board meetings and committees
3. Annual meeting attendance
4. Nominating committee
5. Audit committee
6. Audit committee financial expert
7. Compensation committee
8. Communications from shareholders

Other than the third, which is an attendance check with the count to be publicly reported, the other clauses allow significant flexibility in implementation (or even non-compliance, if an explanation is given). Most major corporations have adopted similar measures; as a result it is more easy to see, as compared to the era before passage of the Sarbanes-Oxley Act, how companies comparatively implement corporate governance.

=== Registration Statement and Prospectus Provisions ===
This section has a well-established regulatory history and is not prone to sudden large changes. Its main use is to cleanly and clearly specify, first, a consistent format that can be used to define the material needed for a prospectus and, second, how to assemble the material together.

==== Items 501 and 502: Cover pages ====
- Item 501: Forepart of Registration Statement and Outside Front Cover Page of Prospectus
- Item 502: Inside Front and Outside Back Cover Pages of Prospectus

A physical paper prospectus may be printed and handed or given to potential investors, or (more commonly today) an online prospectus may be used; both versions must contain essentially the same information, in plain English. The information in the prospectus must agree with the information in Form S-1. Some specifications of 501 and 502 clearly apply to paper prospectuses but the same format can be used for online prospectuses.

Some basic information is required: Name (and explanation if the name is similar to a well-known name), address, and phone number; title and amount of securities; offering price of the securities; whether there is already a market for the securities; name(s) of the lead or managing underwriter(s), if any, and the underwriting arrangements; and date of the prospectus.

Beyond these basics, the following are also required as prominent "legends" (text boxes): A statement of market risk (which must be clearly indicated in the table of contents); a "State legend" (any legend or statement required by the law of any state in which securities are to be offered); and the "Commission legend" (indicating that "neither the SEC nor any state securities commission has approved or disapproved of the securities or passed upon the accuracy or adequacy of the disclosures in the prospectus and that any contrary representation is a criminal offense"). It is possible to make available an incomplete prospectus, provided that there is a "Subject to Completion" legend prominently displayed and no sales effort is made.

==== Item 503: Prospectus Summary ====
This section requires a brief summary of the information in the prospectus in plain english.

==== Item 504: Use of Proceeds ====
This item requires disclosure of the purposes for which the proceeds from the securities to be offered should be used and the approximate amount intended for each purpose. Additional information is required if the proceeds for the offering are insufficient for the intended purpose or if the proceeds will be used for repaying indebtedness, buying non-ordinary course assets, or buying a business. If there are no clear plans for the proceeds, then this must be stated and reasons given for the stock offering. 504(7) notes that "[t]he registrant may reserve the right to change the use of proceeds, provided that such reservation is due to certain contingencies that are discussed specifically and the alternatives to such use in that event are indicated".

==== Item 505: Determination of Offering Price ====
This item has remained unchanged since passed into law on 16 March 1982. For common equity, where common equity is being registered when there is no established public trading market, or where there is a gap between the offering price and the market price, the various factors considered in determining such an offering price must be described. It may be specified that there is no rational means for determining a price.

==== Item 506: Dilution ====
This item requires the calculation and disclosure of how much dilution (a loss in value per share due to share issuance) will take place upon the stock distribution. The company must display:

- The net tangible book value per share before and after the distribution;
- The increase in such net tangible book value per share attributable to the cash paid by purchasers of the shares being offered; and
- The amount of the immediate dilution to be suffered by the purchasers.

==== Item 507: Selling Security Holders ====
Along with offering new shares in the Form S-1 prospectus, prior shareholders may also register some or all of their shares for sale. This item requires disclosure of any such share amounts, who is intending to sell, and how many shares they will have left over after the sale.

==== Item 508: Plan of Distribution ====
The distribution is the shares to be sold and the way and manner in which they will be sold.

If the securities will be underwritten, this item requires the company to: identify the underwriters; identify any relationships with the underwriters; note if the underwriting is committed (the underwriter must buy all the securities) or best-efforts (the underwriter only buys the amount of securities needed for sale to the public); and note any market-out clauses (which allow the underwriter to abandon the offering under certain stock-market conditions). The company must also disclose any other types of underwriting, such as interest or dividend reinvestment plans, that will be involved. Any plans for non-cash outlays such as acquisition, reorganization, readjustment, or succession must be noted.

The details of any distributions through broker-dealers must be disclosed. If the securities are to be offered on an exchange, the exchange must be indicated. If the registered securities are to be offered in connection with the writing of call options traded (or to be traded) on an exchange, such transactions must be described.

The company must provide a table that sets out the nature of the underwriters' compensation and the amount of discounts and commissions to be paid to the underwriter for each security and in total. The table must show the separate amounts to be paid by the company and any current shareholders selling their shares as part of the distribution. Offering expenses must be disclosed in the manner specified in item 511. All discounts and commissions to be allowed or paid to dealers must be disclosed.

If an underwriter has or may place a member on the company's board of directors, this must be disclosed. Any indemnification of underwriters (Note: In the indemnification of underwriters, an agreement has been made to pay for any losses of an underwriter while conducting an underwriting.) must also be disclosed; moreover, if the underwriting agreement provides for indemnification of the underwriters or their controlling persons against any liability arising under the Securities Act, a brief description must be given of such indemnification provisions.

The company must identify any finders (persons or entities who connect two parties for a fee) and, if applicable, describe the relationship between such finders and the company or any underwriter. Any principal underwriter (Note: A principal underwriter is a senior underwriter who makes decisions for all underwriters in the group, usually used for large offerings.) that intends to sell to any accounts over which it exercises discretionary authority (Note: Discretionary accounts are accounts of clients who have permitted their brokers to initiate trades on the client's behalf.) must be disclosed, including an estimate of the amount of securities intended to be thus sold.

If the underwriters or any selling group members (Note: Selling group members are current owners of stock who intend to sell some or all of this stock in the process of the share distribution.) intend to engage in passive market making, (Note: Passive market making is a process in which a market maker is both an underwriter and a buyer of a company's securities in a secondary offering.) the company must describe this. Any transaction that the underwriter intends to conduct or has conducted during or before the offering that stabilizes, maintains, or otherwise affects the market price of the offered securities must also be disclosed.

Item 508 also specifies disclosure requirements for some warrant and rights offerings.

==== Item 509: Interests of Named Experts and Counsel ====
This item covers any kind of expert that might prepare a report to be included in or referenced by a registration statement, including lawyers and accountants. Accountants, moreover, "should note Rule 2–01 of Regulation S-X for the Commission's requirements regarding 'Qualification of Accountants' [that] discusses disqualifying interests". For example, in a registration statement it is reasonable that the company's lawyer will offer an expert opinion on the validity of the shares to be issued and the accountants will offer an expert opinion that the financial statements are correct. In general all material connections between the expert and the company and its principals must be disclosed, but such connections (other than employment for this purpose) are not common.

==== Item 510: Disclosure of Commission Position on Indemnification for Securities Act Liabilities ====
Item 510 demands that boilerplate be included in registration statements to the effect that "Insofar as indemnification for liabilities arising under the Securities Act of 1933 may be permitted to directors, officers or persons controlling the registrant pursuant to the foregoing provisions, the registrant has been informed that in the opinion of the Securities and Exchange Commission such indemnification is against public policy as expressed in the Act and is therefore unenforceable." This wording is not absolute; alternate phrasing can be found that adds statements such as: "in the event that a claim for indemnification against such liabilities (other than the payment by us of expenses incurred or paid by a director or officer of ours in the successful defense of the action, suit or proceeding) is asserted by the director or officer in connection with securities which may have been registered, we will, unless in the opinion of our counsel the matter has been settled by controlling precedent, submit to a court or appropriate jurisdiction the question whether such indemnification by us is against public policy as expressed in the Securities Act and will be governed by the final adjudication of such issues."

==== Item 511: Other Expenses of Issuance and Distribution ====
Item 511 requires an itemized statement of all expenses for the issuance and distribution of the securities to be registered. Typical expenses to be included are registration fees, Federal taxes, States taxes and fees, trustees' and transfer agents' fees, costs of printing and engraving, legal fees, accounting fees, and engineering fees.

==== Item 512: Undertakings ====
This item includes formal pledges (undertakings) that are applicable to whichever of 12 types of offering is being registered: Rule 415 offerings; subsequent Exchange Act documents by reference; warrants and rights offerings; competitive bids; incorporated annual and quarterly reports; equity offerings of nonreporting registrants; registration on Form S-4 or F-4 of securities offered for resale; accelerated becoming effective of registration statement; qualification of trust indentures under the Trust Indenture Act of 1939 for delayed offerings; registration statements permitted by Rule 430A; filings regarding asset-backed securities incorporating by reference subsequent Exchange Act documents by third parties; and filings regarding asset-backed securities that provide certain information through an Internet Web site.

=== Exhibits ===
==== Item 601: Exhibits ====
Registration statements filed online with EDGAR will invariably require the attachment of exhibits. These filings include ongoing reporting requirements, so exhibits usually accompany filings of S-1, 10-K, 10-Q and 8-K forms. The following Securities Act forms commonly have exhibits: S-1, S-3, S-4, S-8, S-11, F-1, F-3 and F-4. The following Exchange Act forms commonly have exhibits: 10, 8-K, 10-D, 10-Q, and 10-K. A complete list of exhibits is in item 601. As of 2020, the oldest operable exhibit is a 1927 Water Supply Contract between Cal Water and PG&E.

Exhibits are not 'merely exhibits' or accessories but are important documents in their own right and must include proper, complete disclosure. Also critical are director and officer certifications and any Codes of Ethics. A filer may add more exhibits (frequently news items) under Exhibit 99 "Additional Exhibits". These are often to be found in form 8-Ks, which are very broad forms used to notify investors of any unscheduled material event that is important to shareholders, but Exhibit 99 may show up in other places.

=== Items 801–802: Industry Guides ===
Securities Act Industry Guides (Item 801) and Exchange Act Industry Guides (Item 802) provide instruction sets on disclosure compliance for particular industries. Primarily affected are companies with oil and gas operations, interests in oil and gas, and programs or companies that are engaged or to be engaged in significant mining operations. Aside from mining and petroleum, guidance is also given on statistical disclosure by bank holding companies, unpaid claims and claim adjustment expenses of property and casualty insurance underwriters, and interests in real estate limited partnerships. The guides are divided into compliance with the Securities Act and the Securities Exchange Act but included in one PDF document, the SEC Industry Guides.

=== Items 901–915: Roll-up Transactions ===
In these transactions, small, private firms merge into a shell company, which goes public at the same time as the merger; this has the effect of several small competitors merging into a (theoretically) larger and more competitive entity. The resulting companies have not succeeded in general. These items are thus rarely seen in filings. The sections involved are:

- Item 901: Definitions
- Item 902: Individual Partnership Supplements
- Item 903: Summary
- Item 904: Risk Factors and Other Considerations
- Item 905: Comparative Information
- Item 906: Allocation of Roll-up Consideration
- Item 907: Background of the Roll-up Transaction
- Item 908: Reasons for and Alternatives to the Roll-up Transaction
- Item 909: Conflicts of Interest
- Item 910: Fairness of the Transaction
- Item 911: Reports, Opinions and Appraisals
- Item 912: Source and Amount of Funds and Transactional Expenses
- Item 913: Other Provisions of the Transaction
- Item 914: Pro Forma Financial Statements; Selected Financial Data
- Item 915: Federal Income Tax Consequences

== Interpretations and Extensions of Regulation S-K ==
=== Environmental Law and Climate Change Disclosure ===
Although never explicitly mentioned in Regulation S-K, SEC Guidance points to the four most pertinent sources of climate change-related disclosure requirements, all contained in Regulation S-K: Item 101, Description of Business; Item 103, Legal Proceedings; Item 503(c), Risk Factors; and Item 303, Management's Discussion and Analysis ("MD&A"). These are also the items concerned with environmental laws and environmental impact.

Item 101 expressly requires disclosures of certain costs of complying with environmental laws. Item 101(c)(1)(xii) requires that appropriate disclosures be made as to the material effects that compliance with Federal, State and local provisions regulating the discharge of materials into the environment, or otherwise relating to protection of the environment, may have upon the expenditures, earnings and competitive position of the registrant and its subsidiaries.

Item 103 requires a registrant to briefly describe pending legal proceedings to which it or its property is a party, in particular any environmental impact litigation. A registrant also must describe material pending legal actions in which its property is the subject of the litigation. If a registrant is aware of similar actions contemplated by governmental authorities, Item 103 requires disclosure of those proceedings as well. Instruction 5 to Item 103 requires the disclosure of certain environmental litigation. Proceedings arising under any Federal, State or local provisions regulating the discharge of materials into the environment must be described if material, i.e., exceed 10 percent of the current assets of the registrant; they must also be described if a governmental authority is a party to such proceedings and such proceedings involve potential monetary sanctions, unless monetary sanctions are to be less than $100,000.

Climate change disclosure remains a fuzzy topic but four principal themes are discussed in SEC guidance: the impact of legislation and regulation; the impact of international accords; the indirect consequences of regulation or business trends; and the physical impacts of climate change.

== History ==
The Jumpstart Our Business Startups Act (JOBS) Act required a review of Regulation S-K, which was published in 2013. The regulation was created in 1982 as the foundation of an "integrated disclosure system" to replace a duplicative patchwork of forms and introduce uniformity registration forms (such as the S-1) and periodic forms such as the 10-K.

The SEC has periodically made updates, especially since the JOBS Act; in 2020, the SEC proposed eliminating 301, 302(a) and 302(b), and updating 303.

== See also ==
- Regulation S-X
- Proxy statement
- Generally accepted accounting principles
