= Transparency Directive =

EU Directive issued in 2004

The Transparency Directive, Transparency Obligations Directive or Directive 2004/109/EC is an EU Directive issued in 2004, revising an earlier Directive 2001/34/EC. The Transparency Directive was amended in 2013 by the Transparency Directive Amending Directive (Directive 2013/50/EU).

The Transparency Directive improves the harmonisation of information duties of issuers, whose securities are listed at a regulated market at a stock exchange within the European Union, and further market participants. The aims of these amendments are to establish minimum requirements regarding the financial information distribution all over the European Union and an increase in transparency at the capital markets and in investor protection to meet information deficits in a developing financial market environment.

The term Transparency Obligations Directive is used in the UK Companies Act 2006, which implemented the Directive within United Kingdom company law.

== History ==
=== The Transparency Directive of 2004 ===
The process, which resulted in the 2004 version of the EU Transparency Directive, passed several years, consultations and revisions. The first step towards the EU Transparency Directive of 2004 took place in July 2001 when the commission of the European Union announced the first consultation regarding the transparency on publicly traded companies. This first consultation period lasted from 17 July 2001 until 30 September 2001. During that time interested parties were able to contribute comments on the proposals, which the commission drafted in its own consultation paper, regarding the new regime on disclosure requirements. Interested parties could be the issuers themselves, national agencies and associations, state authorities and European authorities, such as CESR. The consultation paper of the commission suggested a division of disclosure duties, in periodic and ongoing obligations, for example for financial reports (periodical) and ad hoc notifications (ongoing), and a focus on the publications of those information through a medium on a Europe-wide basis as well as the control of these duties by the national supervisory authorities. Until the end of the consultation period the commission received 90 contributions from market participants all over Europe, whereas most of the answers came from British and German interest groups. Mostly these answers complied with the suggestions, which were made up by the commission.

However, there have also been some amendments:

- Reducing the lowest threshold regarding notifications of major voting rights
- Introducing International Accounting Standards into financial reports
- Publication of information via newspaper and internet
- Responsibility of state authorities for supervision (in cooperation with stock exchanges)

After the first consultation the Commission revised its consultation paper to present it to the public another time. In May 2002 the Commission launched a second and final consultation period, which lasted from 8 May 2002 until 5 July 2002. The Commission specified the information requirements regarding issuers, listed in a regulated market at a stock exchange, especially in terms of financial reporting, voting rights, directors' dealing, stock options, employee shares schemes and equal treatment of shareholders.

In detail, those suggestions were:

- Financial reporting requirements based on the annual turnover
- Equal treatment of shareholders by admitting proxy voting rights and electronic voting
- Lower initial threshold for notifications of voting rights at 5%
- Introducing further thresholds at 15% and 30%
- Time limit for filing such notification: 5 calendar days
- Publication of such notifications on the issuer's homepage, in a newspaper and further information/news providers

These suggestions were basically confirmed by the interested parties.

On 26 May 2003 the Commission proposed its draft for the Directive to the European Parliament and to the Council of the European Union. About one year later, on 30 March 2004, the European Parliament approved the Directive, whereby the unofficial version of the Directive was published on 11 May 2004. This unofficial version covered all of the topics discussed in the former consultation process, such as periodical financial reporting, transparency in shareholder structure and publication of information.

The final version of the Directive 2004/109/EC of the European Parliament and of the Council on the harmonisation of transparency requirements in relation to information about issuers whose securities are admitted to trading on a regulated market was adopted on 17 December 2004. After the announcement of the Directive in the Official Journal of the European Union the Member State should transform the regulations, agreed on in the Directive, into national law within the next two years, not later that 20 January 2007.

=== The Transparency Directive Amending Directive of 2013 ===
The Transparency Directive was amended in 2013 by the Transparency Directive Amending Directive (TDAD), Directive 2013/50/EU. The final date for member states to implement the TDAD was 26 November 2015. The TDAD contains these elements:

- Issuers are no longer obliged to publish interim reports (unless a Member State chooses to still impose it as an obligation)
- Issuers who have activities in the extractive or logging of primary forest industries should disclose in a separate report, on an annual basis, payments made to governments in the countries in which they operate
- Notification of major holdings of voting rights should include cash-settlement financial instruments with similar economic effect to holding shares and entitlements to acquire shares
- Issuers should prepare their annual financial reports in the European single electronic reporting format (ESEF) (from 1 January 2020 on)
- ESMA should develop and operate a web portal serving as a European electronic access point (EEAP) for regulated information

== Regulations ==
The Directive specifies a range of regulations which have to be transformed into national law by the Member State, whereas the Directive only sets minimum standards. Member State have the possibility to set up stricter rules.

=== Scope ===
This Directive is directed to issuers whose securities are admitted to trading on a regulated market situated or operating within a Member State and regulates requirements regarding the disclosure of periodic and ongoing information.

=== Definitions ===
The Directive defines several terms, which are used in the new regulations, either by referring to other Directives or by its own definition.

=== Periodic information ===
==== Annual financial reports ====
The issuer has to publish its annual financial report not later than four months after the end of the fiscal year and has to ensure that this report is accessible for at least five years. The annual financial report has to include the audited financial statements, a management report and a statement by officials that the financial statements were set up in compliance with the applicable accounting standards. In addition to the annual financial report the audit report should be published, as well.

==== Half-yearly financial reports ====
The issuer has to publish a financial report covering the first half of the fiscal year after the end of this relevant period. This report has to include the financial statements for the first half of the fiscal year, an interim management report (including major events in the first half-year, a forecast for the next half-year and their possible impacts and further financial statements) and a statement by officials that the financial statements were set up in compliance with the applicable accounting standards. In case this half-yearly report gets audited, the audit report has to be published as well.

=== Ongoing information ===
==== Major Holdings of voting rights ====
A shareholder, acquiring or selling shares, has to notify the issuer of such transactions, as soon as the acquisition or disposal of shares results in an amount of voting rights, that exceeds, falls below or reaches the threshold of 5%, 10%, 15%, 20%, 25%, 30%, 50% and 75% of the total amount of voting rights issued.

This notification requirement can also be based on the following cases:

- Acting in concert with other shareholders
- Voting rights are held by a third party and will be transferred temporarily to a different shareholder
- Shares are lodged as collateral
- Life interest
- Voting rights being held by a controlled undertaking
- Voting rights be deposited with a third person (whereas the third person is allowed to exercise the voting rights on its own discretion)
- Holding voting rights in behalf of the legal owner
- Exercising voting rights as proxy

This notification has to include the amount of voting rights held after acquisition/disposal, the day on which the event took place, the chain of controlled undertakings or the name of the (directly invested) shareholder from which the notifying party gets attributed the voting rights. Furthermore, a notification is required when a natural person or legal entity holds financial instruments, which result in the entitlement to acquire voting rights, whereas the acquisition is based on the holder's initiative. These regulations should not apply for shareholders, holding the shares as market makers, for clearing and settlement purposes and credit institutions, holding the shares in their trading book, and holding less than 10% of the total amount of voting rights issued.

==== Information requirements for issuers ====
Issuers are obliged to treat those shareholders equally, which are in the same position. Furthermore issuers have to make all available all kinds of information that are necessary for the shareholders to ensure the exercise of their rights. person to exercise their voting and/or financial rights, either in paper or electronic form. After the annual general meeting the issuer has to publish decisions made at the annual general meeting, if applicable, which are: payment of dividends and issue of new shares, including allotment-, subscription-, cancellation- and conversion rights of the new shares.

=== General obligations ===
As long as shareholders or issuers have to provide information to each other, e.g. disclose the holding of voting rights, this information has to be filed with the state authority at the same time as well. The same applies for issuers, who propose the annual meeting to change their articles of incorporation.

=== Competent authorities and their power ===
Each Member State of the European Union has to designate a state authority, which should be responsible for carrying out the obligations regarding shareholders and issuers. Therefore, the Member States have to empower the authorities to achieve the aims of the Directive. Especially the authorities should be able to require involved parties to provide them with information and documents regarding each single case or require the issuers and shareholder to disclose such information, which is necessary to fulfill their requirements. Additionally the authorities shall be empowered to carry out on-site inspection, to verify compliance with the statutory requirements.
