= Pakistan Investment Bond =

Debt issued by the Government of Pakistan

Pakistan Investment Bond (PIB), formerly known as Federal Investment Bond, is a government-issued debt security of Pakistan with maturity exceeding one year.

== History ==
Pakistan Investment Bond was launched in 1992 as Federal Investment Bond.

In December 2001, the Government of Pakistan introduced Pakistan Investment Bonds (PIBs), replacing Federal Investment Bonds, with maturities of three, five, and ten years. The primary purpose of these scripless bonds was to establish a long-term yield curve to assist corporate entities in pricing their debt instruments. These scripless bonds carry a fixed coupon rate, while their yields are determined by market supply and demand.

By the end of 2001, PIBs had become a benchmark for corporates to price term finance certificates and facilitated secondary market debt raising.
