= Form S-1 =

SEC filing used by companies planning on going public

Form S-1 is an SEC filing used by companies planning on going public to register their securities with the U.S. Securities and Exchange Commission (SEC) as the "registration statement by the Securities Act of 1933". The S-1 contains the basic business and financial information on an issuer with respect to a specific securities offering. Investors may use the prospectus to consider the merits of an offering and make educated investment decisions. A prospectus is one of the main documents used by an investor to research a company prior to an initial public offering (IPO). Other less detailed registration forms, such as Form S-3, may be used for certain registrations.

Every business day, S-1 forms are filed with the SEC's EDGAR filing system, the required filing format of the U.S. Securities and Exchange Commission. However many of these are of the related Form S-1/A, which is used for filing amendments to a previously filed Form S-1.

The S-1 form has an OMB approval number of 3234-0065 and the online form is only 8 pages long. However the simplicity of the form's design is belied by the OMB Office's figure of the estimated average burden – 972.32 hours. This means that much time and effort in preparation of the form is being used to collect and display information about the filer (a corporate registrant or new registrant who intends to offer securities). The S-1 form requires that the registrant provide information from diverse sources and incorporate this information using many rules or regulations, such as General Rules and Regulations under the Securities Act, Regulation C, Regulation S-K and Regulation S-X.

Under the JOBS Act, it has been possible since April 2012 for "emerging growth companies" to file a Form S-1 on a confidential basis, only making the contents public 21 days prior to the road show for the IPO. This quickly became a popular method for even established companies (such as Manchester United and MGM Studios) to conduct securities offerings.
