= Trader (finance) =

Person who trades stocks

A trader is a person, firm, or entity in finance who buys and sells financial instruments, such as forex, cryptocurrencies, stocks, bonds, commodities, derivatives, mutual funds, and indices in the capacity of an agent, hedger, arbitrager, or speculator.

== Duties and types ==
The word "trader" appeared as early as 1863 in a universal dictionary as "trading man." Traders work for financial institutions as foreign exchange or securities dealers in the cash market and in the futures market, or for their own account as proprietary traders. They also include stock exchange traders, but not stockbrokers or lead brokers.

Traders buy and sell financial instruments traded in the stock markets, derivatives markets and commodity markets, comprising the stock exchanges, derivatives exchanges, and the commodities exchanges. Several categories and designations for diverse kinds of traders are found in finance, including:

- Bond trader
- Floor trader
- Hedge fund trader
- High-frequency trader
- Market maker
- Pattern day trader
- Principal trader
- Proprietary trader
- Rogue trader
- Scalper
- Stock trader

== Income ==
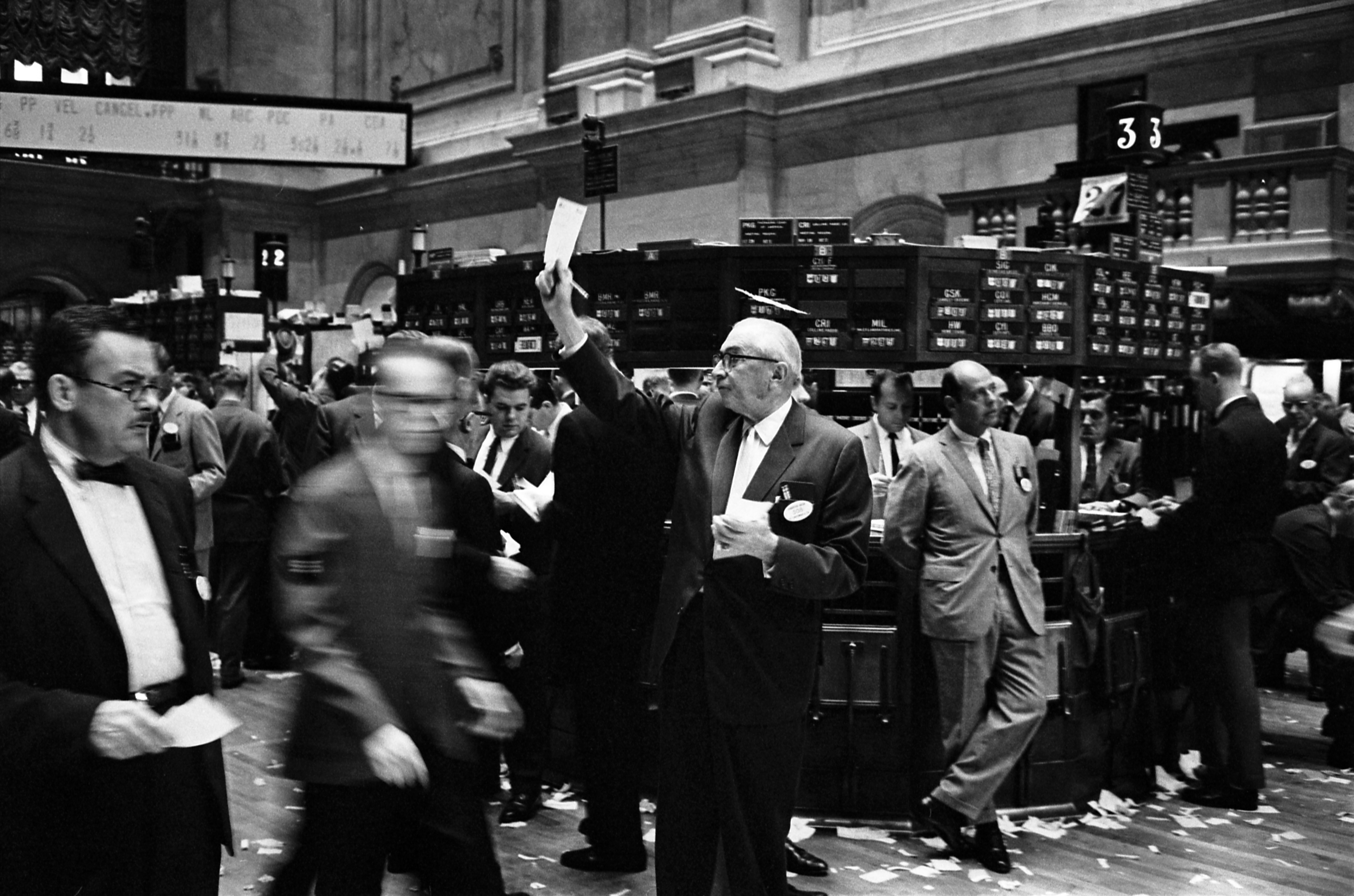
NYSE's stock exchange traders floor c 1960, before the introduction of electronic readouts and computer screens

According to The Wall Street Journal in 2004, a managing director convertible bond trader was earning between $700,000 and $900,000 on average.

== See also ==
- Commodities exchange
- Commodity market
- Derivatives market
- Financial risk management § Investment management
- List of commodity traders
- List of trading losses
- Mismarking
- Stock exchange
- Stock market
- Trading strategy
