= Gross spread =

Gross spread refers to the fees that underwriters receive for arranging and underwriting an offering of debt or equity securities. The gross spread for an initial public offering (IPO) can be higher than 10% while the gross spread on a debt offering can be as low as 0.05%.

For example, if a company sells $100 million of shares in an IPO and the gross spread is 7%, the underwriting syndicate will receive fees of $7 million. These fees will be divided among the underwriters arranging the offering.
