= Standstill =

A standstill is a situation of no movement or activity.

Standstill may refer to:

- Lunar standstill, a time at which the range of the Moon's declination is at a maximum or minimum
- Standstill (band), a Spanish post-hardcore-band
- Standstill (bicycle), a technique used by bicycle riders
- Standstill agreement, an instrument of a hostile takeover defence
- Standstill operation, a surgical procedure that involves cooling the patient's body and stopping blood circulation
- Standstill period, a period of time per the Official Journal of the European Union before a contract is signed with a successful supplier(s)
- Standstill (song), from the debut EP It's All About the Girls by New Found Glory
