= Third market =

Over-the-counter trading of exchange-listed securities

In finance, third market is the trading of exchange-listed securities in the over-the-counter (OTC) market. These trades allow institutional investors to trade blocks of securities directly, rather than through an exchange, providing liquidity and anonymity to buyers.

Third market trading was pioneered in the 1960s by firms such as Jefferies & Company although today there are a number of brokerage firms focused on third market trading, and more recently dark pools.

== See also ==
- Primary market
- Secondary market
- Fourth market
- Private equity secondary market
- OTC Markets Group
