= Primary market =

Market for direct issue of securities

The primary market is the part of the capital market that deals with the issuance and sale of securities to purchasers directly by the issuer, with the issuer being paid the proceeds. A primary market means the market for new issues of securities, as distinguished from the secondary market, where previously issued securities are bought and sold. A market is primary if the proceeds of sales go to the issuer of the securities sold. Buyers buy securities that were not previously traded.

== Concept ==
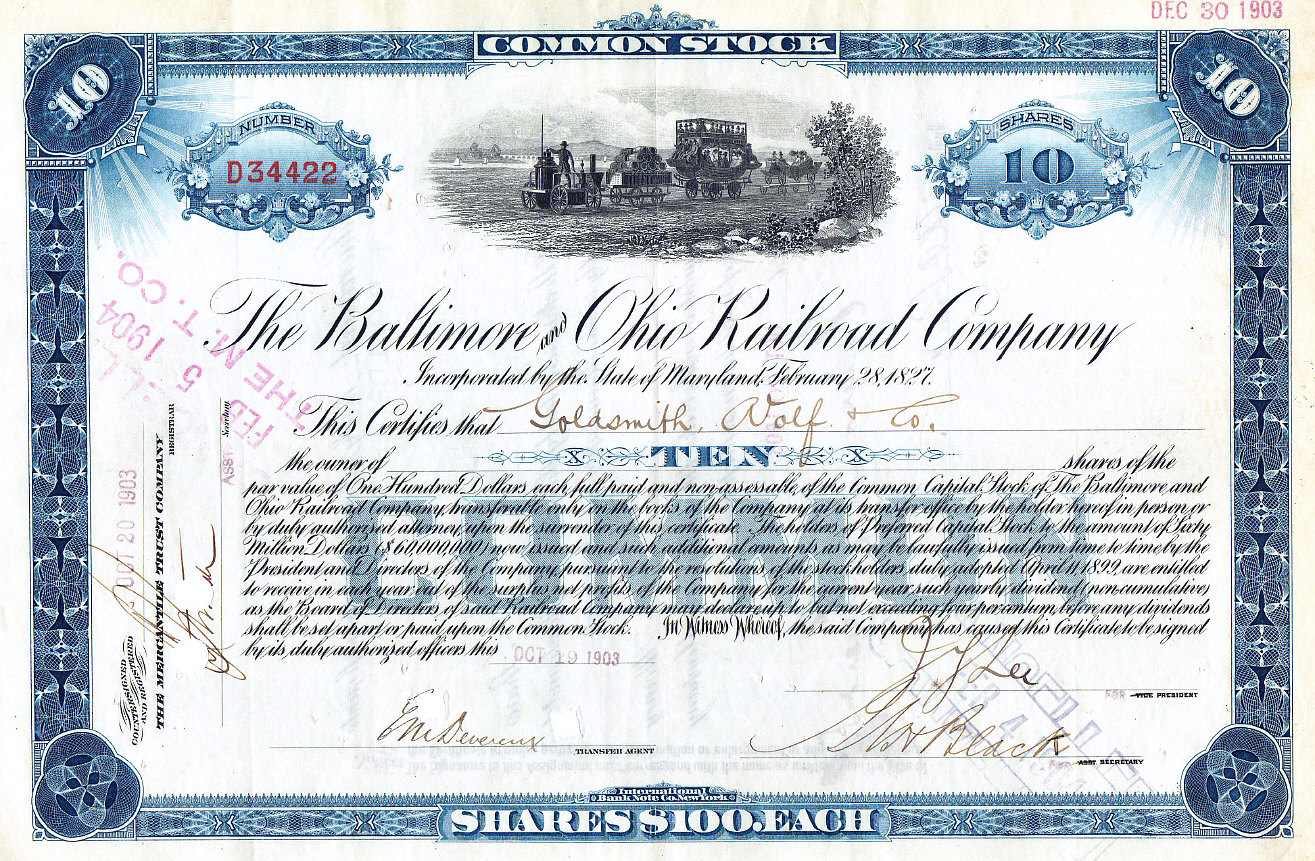
Stock certificate for ten shares of the Baltimore and Ohio Railroad Company

In a primary market, companies, governments, or public sector institutions can raise funds through bond issues, and corporations can raise capital through the sale of new stock through an initial public offering (IPO). This is often done through an investment bank or underwriter or finance syndicate of securities dealers. The process of selling new shares to buyers is called underwriting. Dealers earn a commission that is commonly built into the price of the security offering, though it can be found in the prospectus.

IPOs are not the only way new securities are issued. Publicly traded companies can issue new shares in what is called a primary issue of debt or stock, which involves the issue by a corporation of its own debt or new stock directly to buyers like pension funds, or to private investors and shareholders.

Since the securities are issued directly by the company to its buyers, the company receives the money and issues new security certificates to the buyers. The primary market plays the crucial function of facilitating capital formation within the economy. The securities issued at the primary market can be issued in face value, premium value, or at par value.

Primary markets create long-term instruments through which corporate entities raise funds from the capital market. It is also known as the New Issue Market (NIM).

Once issued, the securities typically trade thereafter on a secondary market such as a stock exchange, bond market, or derivatives exchange.

== Raising funds ==
Corporate entities raise funds from the primary market in three ways:

1. Public issue: a stock exchange lists the securities, and the corporation raises funds through initial public offering (IPO).
2. Rights issue: existing shareholders are offered more shares at a discounted price and on a pro rata basis.
3. Preferential allotment: a corporation issues shares at a price which may or may not be related to the current market price of the same security.

== See also ==
- Secondary market
- Third market
- Fourth market
