= Principal trade =

A principal trade occurs when a brokerage house buys securities on the secondary market with the express strategy to hold long enough for a price appreciation. At that point, the broker sells to end users and gains appreciation plus commission. Brokers are required to notify when they provide a principal trade, though will typically obfuscate the fact through the fine print. The broker always seeks to sell their inventory to prospective buyers rather than buying new into the market. Such practice is common in bond sales.

In the US, the Securities and Exchange Commission oversees principal trading at registered advisors and funds for compliance with Investment Company Act of 1940 [Section 17(a)] and with the Investment Advisers Act [Section 206(3)]. The SEC can take enforcement action if it suspects improper activities or lack of appropriate disclosures.
