= Regulation S-X =

Prescribed regulation in the United States

Regulation S-X is a prescribed regulation in the United States of America that lays out the specific form and content of financial reports, specifically the financial statements of public companies. It is cited as 17 C.F.R. Part 210; the name of the part is "Form and Content of and Requirements for Financial Statements, Securities Act of 1933, Securities Exchange Act of 1934, Public Utility Holding Company Act of 1935, Investment Company Act of 1940, Investment Advisers Act of 1940, and Energy Policy and Conservation Act of 1975".

Regulation S-X extends the meaning of the term 'financial statements' to include all notes to the statements and all related schedules. Regulation S-X is closely related to Regulation S-K, which lays out reporting requirements for various SEC filings and registrations used by public companies. Regulation S-X profoundly affects internal and external accountants and auditors, and directors and officers and numerous officials, employees and contractors of publicly reporting companies, and because of the need for accurate reporting of monies and other data, any operation of a company may be affected to require ultimate compliance with Regulation S-X and the Sarbanes–Oxley Act.

== Applicability ==
Regulation S-X and the Financial Reporting Releases (Staff Accounting Bulletins) set forth the form and content of and requirements for financial statements required to be filed as a part of (a) registration statements under the Securities Act of 1933 and (b) registration statements under section 12, annual or other reports under sections 13 and 15(d) and proxy and information statements under section 14 of the Securities Exchange Act of 1934; except as otherwise specifically provided in the forms.

Regulation S-X is seen less frequently but is equally valid for (c) registration statements, annual reports and shareholder reports filed under the Public Utility Holding Company Act of 1935 and likewise for (d) the Investment Company Act of 1940.

== Relationship to GAAP ==
Regulation S-X generally implicitly discusses US Generally Accepted Accounting Principles (GAAP). However, non-GAAP measures are sometimes used by companies to provide insight into its business. Non-GAAP financial measures are defined in Regulation G. Regulations G and Item 10e of Regulation S-K provide guidance on the use of non-GAAP measures. In May 2016 the SEC also issued additional Compliance & Disclosure Interpretations related to the rules and regulations on the use of non-GAAP financial measures.

== Responsible agencies ==
Regulation S-X was devised by the SEC staff with copious input from accounting-related entities. Major entities involved in its maintenance include:

- House Committee on Financial Services;
- Financial Accounting Standards with FASB Accounting Pronouncements;
- Federal Accounting Standards Advisory Board;
- Public Company Accounting Oversight Board;
- (AICPA) American Institute of Certified Public Accountants; and
- (IASB) International Accounting Standards Board and IFRS pronouncements.

== Application of Regulation S-X (Rules 1-01, 1-02) ==
Because Regulation S-X is large and its impact on financial report is so pervasive, it is important to have a consistent terminology and to get it right from the beginning so that words and phrases have the same meaning throughout. Among other terms, certain basic terms are assigned meanings. For examples: Accountant's report, Amount, Certified, Control, Fiscal Year, Share, Wholly Owned Subsidiary, and so on.

A specific meaning is also given for "Summarized financial information".

A specific meaning is not given for the complex term Internal control over financial reporting, but reference is made to Rule 13a-15(f). As the failure to have such controls or properly implement them or use/provide their disclosure may come with penalties and since this phrase pervades thinking and rule-making in the securities industry, it is worth viewing this definition, a definition that requires management to be pro-active:

The term internal control over financial reporting is defined as a process designed by, or under the supervision of, the issuer's principal executive and principal financial officers, or persons performing similar functions, and effected by the issuer's board of directors, management and other personnel, to provide reasonable assurance regarding the reliability of financial reporting and the preparation of financial statements for external purposes in accordance with generally accepted accounting principles and includes those policies and procedures that:

1. Pertain to the maintenance of records that in reasonable detail accurately and fairly reflect the transactions and dispositions of the assets of the issuer;

2. Provide reasonable assurance that transactions are recorded as necessary to permit preparation of financial statements in accordance with generally accepted accounting principles, and that receipts and expenditures of the issuer are being made only in accordance with authorizations of management and directors of the issuer; and

3. Provide reasonable assurance regarding prevention or timely detection of unauthorized acquisition, use or disposition of the issuer's assets that could have a material effect on the financial statements.

== Qualifications and reports of accountants ==
Qualifications and Reports of Accountants (Rules 2-01 to 2-07)

After laying out some basic and important definitions in Rule 1-02, Regulation S-X kicks off in Rule 2-01 (Qualifications of Accountants) by considering accountants and auditors and states who is acceptable to the SEC to act as such. Accountants and auditors must be properly registered in their own jurisdiction: "The Commission will not recognize any person as a certified public accountant who is not duly registered and in good standing as such under the laws of the place of his residence or principal office."

Further, one issue that matters critically is independence of the auditor from the client company. Final Rule 33-8183, (https://www.sec.gov/rules/final/33-8183.htm, January 28, 2003) while discussing audit services, non-audit services and auditor/accountant independence,

- revised the Commission's regulations related to the non-audit services that, if provided to an audit client, would impair an accounting firm's independence;
- required that an issuer's audit committee pre-approve all audit and non-audit services provided to the issuer by the auditor of an issuer's financial statements;
- prohibited certain partners on the audit engagement team from providing audit services to the issuer for more than *five or seven consecutive years, depending on the partner's involvement in the audit, except that certain small accounting firms may be exempted from this requirement;
- prohibited an accounting firm from auditing an issuer's financial statements if certain members of management of that issuer had been members of the accounting firm's audit engagement team within the one-year period preceding the commencement of audit procedures;
- require that the auditor of an issuer's financial statements report certain matters to the issuer's audit committee, including "critical" accounting policies used by the issuer; and require disclosures to investors of information related to audit and non-audit services provided by, and fees paid to, the auditor of the issuer's financial statements.
- In addition, under the final rules, an accountant would not be independent from an audit client if an audit partner received compensation based on selling engagements to that client for services other than audit, review and attest services.

The Commission's principles of independence with respect to services provided by auditors are largely predicated on three basic principles, violations of which would impair the auditor's independence:

(1) an auditor cannot function in the role of management,

(2) an auditor cannot audit his or her own work, and

(3) an auditor cannot serve in an advocacy role for his or her client.

To be extra clear about it, Sarbanes–Oxley lays out the nine impermissibles—that is the nine categories of prohibited non-audit services for auditors:

1. Bookkeeping or other services related to the accounting records or financial statements of the audit client;
2. Financial information systems design and implementation;
3. Appraisal or valuation services, fairness opinions, or contribution-in-kind reports;
4. Actuarial services;
5. Internal audit outsourcing services;
6. Management functions or human resources;
7. Broker or dealer, investment adviser, or investment banking services;
8. Legal services and expert services unrelated to the audit; and
9. Any other service that the company's board determines, by regulation, is impermissible.

Here is where the SEC places the corporate onus: "The final rules recognize the critical role played by audit committees in the financial reporting process and the unique position of audit committees in assuring auditor independence "... because of "the unique ability and responsibility of the audit committee to insulate the auditor from the pressures that may be exerted by management."

The result of Final Rule 33-8183 was to add Rule 2-07 to Regulation S-X and to amend Rule 2-01 of Regulation S-X, as well as affect several other regulations, rules and forms.

These changes were triggered mainly by the Sarbanes–Oxley Act of 2002, enacted on July 30, 2002. Title II of the Sarbanes–Oxley Act, entitled "Auditor Independence" required the Commission to adopt, by January 26, 2003, final rules such as 33-8183.

Section 201 of Sarbanes–Oxley require that non-audit services that are not prohibited under the Sarbanes–Oxley Act and the Commission's rules be subject to pre-approval by the registrant's audit committee. These rules specify the requirements for obtaining such pre-approval from the registrant's audit committee. Section 202 of Sarbanes–Oxley requires an audit committee to pre-approve allowable non-audit services and specifies certain exceptions to the requirement to obtain pre-approval. These rules specify the requirements of the registrant's audit committee for pre-approving non-audit services by the auditor of the registrant's financial statements.

Thus it can be seen that the audit committee membership is not a reward for good behavior or a sinecure but rather a weighty responsibility flowing from the Sarbanes–Oxley Act, various SEC regulations, rules and Final Rules, to also discharge the responsibilities of Regulations S-X and Regulation S-K.

Qualifications and Reports of Accountants

- 210.2-01 Qualifications of accountants.
- 210.2-02 Accountants' reports and attestation reports.
- 210.2-02T Accountants' reports and attestation reports on internal control over financial reporting.
- 210.2-03 Examination of financial statements by foreign government auditors.
- 210.2-04 Examination of financial statements of persons other than the registrant.
- 210.2-05 Examination of financial statements by more than one accountant.
- 210.2-06 Retention of audit and review records.
- 210.2-07 Communication with audit committees.

After this initial section where the SEC lays out the requirements and limitations on interaction between company, management, audit committee, accountants and the auditor, Regulation S-X is then free to carry on and discuss the form and content of financial statements and financial reporting. Among other things Rule 210.2-06 (Retention of audit and review records) imposes a period of seven years after an accountant concludes an audit or review of an issuer's financial statements, during which the accountant shall retain records relevant to the audit or review, including work-papers and other documents that form the basis of the audit or review, and memoranda, correspondence, communications, other documents, and records (including electronic records).

== General instructions as to financial statements ==
General Instructions as to Financial Statements (Rules 3-01 to 3-20)

Although referred to as "General Instructions" they are usually quite specific.

All financial statements shall be audited unless otherwise indicated.

Rules 3-01 to 3-20 specify the balance sheets and statements of income and cash flows to be included in disclosure documents when prepared in accordance with Regulation S-X.

Other portions of Regulation S-X govern the examination, form and content of such financial statements, including the basis of consolidation and the schedules to be filed.

- Rule 3-01—Consolidated Balance Sheets

Registrants must file audited balance sheets as of the end of each of the two most recent fiscal years for the registrant and its consolidated subsidiaries. Any interim balance sheet provided in accordance with the requirements of this section may be unaudited but shall be at least as current as the most recent balance sheet filed with the Commission on Form 10-Q. Where filings must be made yet year-end balance sheets are not yet available, provision is made for use of interim balance sheets, including time limits on large and accelerated filers.

- Rule 3-02—Consolidated Statements of Income and Changes in Financial Position

Registrants must file audited statements of income and cash flows for each of the three fiscal years preceding the date of the most recent audited balance sheet for the registrant and its consolidated subsidiaries and predecessors. In addition, for any interim period between the latest audited balance sheet and the date of the most recent interim balance sheet being filed, interim statements of income and cash flows shall be provided. Such interim financial statements may be unaudited.

- Rule 3-03—Instructions to Income Statement Requirements

The instructions note that any unaudited interim financial statements furnished shall reflect all adjustments which are necessary to a fair statement of the results; and a statement to that effect shall be included. Such adjustments shall include, for example, appropriate estimated provisions for bonus and profit sharing arrangements normally determined or settled at year-end. If all such adjustments are of a normal recurring nature, a statement to that effect shall be made. Otherwise, there shall be furnished information describing in appropriate detail the nature and amount of any adjustments other than normal recurring adjustments.

Also, disclosures regarding segments required by generally accepted accounting principles shall be provided for each year for which an audited statement of income is provided.

== Consolidated and combined financial statements ==
Consolidated and Combined Financial Statements (Rules 3A-01 to 3A-05)

It is not a law of nature that statements of related or subsidiary entities must be consolidated, however the presumption is that unless there is a good reason not to consolidate, consolidated statements should provide a better picture of overall operations and therefore should be provided.

The degree of ownership of one entity by its parent; foreign subsidiaries; differing fiscal reporting periods - are among the factors management must consider in deciding if or to what extent to consolidate income statements. Rule 3-04 requires that inter-company items and transactions in the consolidated financial statements being filed and unrealized inter-company profits and losses shall be eliminated.

== Rules of general application ==
Rules of General Application (Rules 4-01 to 4-10)

- Rule 4-01 requires that financial statement be prepared according to US GAAP or 'translated' to US GAAP, with few exceptions.

The Rule also includes "The information required with respect to any statement shall be furnished as a minimum requirement to which shall be added such further material information as is necessary to make the required statements, in the light of the circumstances under which they are made, not misleading." No limit is specified here as to the amount of further information that might be required.

The other Rules here are of little interest with the notable exceptions of Rule 4-08 General Notes to Financial Statements and Rule 4-10 Financial Accounting and Reporting for Oil and Gas Producing Activities. Rule 4-10 must be carefully followed only by oil and gas producers and those who search for raw petroleum sources, but Rule 4-08 is of universal applicability.

- Rule 4-08 requires that the notes to financial statements (modern financial statements 'always' have notes) contain certain information and are presented in a certain way.

1. Principles of consolidation or combination.
2. Assets subject to lien.
3. Defaults.
4. Preferred shares.
5. Restrictions which limit the payment of dividends by the registrant.
6. Significant changes in bonds, mortgages and similar debt.
7. Summarized financial information of subsidiaries not consolidated and 50 percent or less owned persons.
8. Income tax expense.
9. Warrants or rights outstanding.
10. [Reserved]
11. Related party transactions which affect the financial statements.
12. [Reserved.]
13. Repurchase and reverse repurchase agreements.
14. Accounting policies for certain derivative instruments.

For example, #8 (Income Tax Expense) is only four modest paragraphs but must be complied with in the light of FAS 109 Summary- Accounting for Income Taxes, a 116-page document.

== Commercial and industrial companies ==
Commercial and Industrial Companies (Rules 5-01 to 5-04)

"Commercial and Industrial Companies" is a very general category comprising most trading or potentially tradable companies. Rule 5 applies to all entities except for those covered by Rule 6, Rule 6A, Rule 7 and Rule 9. Rule 5 'keeps everybody on the same page' by requiring the minimum acceptable disclosure for Balance Sheets and Income Statements.

- Rule 5-02 Balance Sheets "The purpose of this rule is to indicate the various line items and certain additional disclosures which ... should appear on the face of the balance sheets or related notes ..."
- Rule 5-03 Income Statements "The purpose of this rule is to indicate the various line items which ... should appear on the face of the income statements ..."

== Registered investment companies ==
Registered Investment Companies (Rules 6-01 to 6-10)

Investment companies, mainly mutual funds, with any interstate presence and above a certain size, must register with the SEC under The Investment Company Act of 1940.

Investment companies are considered to be an industry with special reporting requirements, outlined in Rules 6-01 to 6-10. See also other sections such as Article 12 which addresses the schedule of investments and additional schedules required of registered investment companies.

== Employee stock purchase, savings and similar plans ==
Employee Stock Purchase, Savings and Similar Plans (Rules 6A-01 to 6A-05)

Rule 6A-01—Application of Rule 6A-01 to Rule 6A-05

Rule 6A-02—Special Rules Applicable to Employee Stock Purchase, Savings and Similar Plans

Rule 6A-03—Statements of Financial Condition

Rule 6A-04—Statements of Income and Changes in Plan Equity

Rule 6A-05—What Schedules Are to Be Filed

== Insurance companies ==
Insurance Companies (Rules 7-01 to 7-05)

Rule 7-01—Application of Rule 7-01 to Rule 7-05

Rule 7-02—General Requirement

Rule 7-03—Balance Sheets

Rule 7-04—Income Statements

Rule 7-05—What Schedules Are to Be Filed

== Financial statements of smaller reporting companies ==
Financial Statements of smaller reporting companies (Rules 8-01 to 8-08)

Rule 8-01—Preliminary Notes to Article 8

Rule 8-02—Annual Financial Statements

Rule 8-03—Interim Financial Statements

Rule 8-04—Financial Statements of Businesses Acquired or to be Acquired

Rule 8-05—Pro Forma Financial Information

Rule 8-06—Real Estate Operations Acquired or to be Acquired

Rule 8-07—Limited Partnerships

Rule 8-08—Age of Financial Statements

== Bank holding companies ==
Bank Holding Companies (Rules 9-01 to 9-06)

Rule 9-01—Application of Rule 9-01 to Rule 9-07

Rule 9-02—General Requirement

Rule 9-03—Balance Sheets

Rule 9-04—Income Statements

Rule 9-05—Foreign Activities

Rule 9-06—Condensed Financial Information of Registrant

Rule 9-07 -- [Reserved]

== Interim financial statements ==
Interim Financial Statements (Rule 10-1)

Rule 10-01—Interim Financial Statements

== Pro-forma financial information ==
Pro-Forma Financial Information (Rules 11-01 to 11-03)

== Form and content of schedules ==
Form and Content of Schedules (Rules 12-01 to 12-09)

GENERAL

- Rule 12-01—Application of Rule 12-01 to Rule 12-29
- Rule 12-02—to Rule 12-03 [Reserved]
- Rule 12-04—Condensed Financial Information of Registrant
- Rule 12-05—to Rule 12-08 [Reserved]
- Rule 12-09—Valuation and Qualifying Accounts
- Rule 12-10—to Rule 12-11 [Reserved]

FOR MANAGEMENT INVESTMENT COMPANIES

- Rule 12-12—Investments in Securities of Unaffiliated Issuers
- Rule 12-12A—Investments—Securities Sold Short
- Rule 12-12B—Open Option Contracts Written
- Rule 12-12C—Summary Schedule of Investments in Securities of Unaffiliated Issuers
- Rule 12-13—Investments Other than Securities
- Rule 12-14—Investments In and Advances To Affiliates
- Rule 12-15—Summary of Investments—Other than Investments in Related Parties
- Rule 12-16—Supplementary Insurance Information
- Rule 12-17—Reinsurance
- Rule 12-18—Supplemental Information (for Property-Casualty Insurance Underwriters)

FOR FACE AMOUNT CERTIFICATE INVESTMENT COMPANIES

- Rule 12-21—Investments in Securities of Unaffiliated Issuers
- Rule 12-22—Investments In and Advances To Affiliates and Income Thereon
- Rule 12-23—Mortgage Loans on Real Estate and Interest Earned on Mortgages
- Rule 12-24—Real Estate Owned and Rental Income
- Rule 12-25—Supplementary Profit and Loss Information
- Rule 12-26—Certificate Reserves
- Rule 12-27—Qualified Assets on Deposit

FOR CERTAIN REAL ESTATE COMPANIES

- Rule 12-28—Real Estate and Accumulated Depreciation
- Rule 12-29—Mortgage Loans on Real Estate

== History ==
Regulation S-X was announced in Accounting Series Release no. 11 and first appeared in the Code of Federal Regulations in 1941. For copies of Regulation S-X as they appear in the Code from 1997 to the present see Code of Federal Regulations (Annual Edition). The SEC has also occasionally issued Regulation as a separate publication. See the Table below for these earlier versions of the Regulation.

Year	Date	Official title
1940		Regulation S-X: form and content of financial statements (1940) full-text
1941	February 1	Regulation S-X: form and content of financial statements as amended to and including February 1, 1941 full-text
1941	June 20	Regulation S-X: form and content of financial statements as amended to and including June 20, 1941 full-text
1942	May 15	Regulation S-X: form and content of financial statements as amended to and including May 15, 1942 full-text
1946	April 1	Regulation S-X: form and content of financial statements as amended to and including April 1, 1946 full-text
1947	April 1	Regulation S-X: form and content of financial statements as amended to and including April 1, 1947 full-text
1951	March 12	Regulation S-X: form and content of financial statements as amended to and including March 12, 1951 full-text
1953	November 3	Regulation S-X: form and content of financial statements as amended to and including November 3, 1953 full-text
1955	January 10	Regulation S-X: form and content of financial statements as amended to and including January 10, 1955, Reprinted November 1, 1956 full-text
1958	August 20	Regulation S-X: form and content of financial statements as in effect August 20, 1958 full-text
1961	February 15	Regulation S-X: form and content of financial statements as in effect February 15, 1961 full-text
1962	July 15	Regulation S-X: form and content of financial statements as in effect July 15, 1962 full-text
1964	October 15	Regulation S-X: form and content of financial statements as amended October 15, 1964 full-text
1966	August 1	Regulation S-X: form and content of financial statements as in effect August 1, 1966 full-text
1968	September 1	Regulation S-X: form and content of financial statements as in effect September 1, 1968 full-text
1970	October 14	Regulation S-X: form and content of financial statements as in effect October 14, 1970 full-text

== Definitions ==
Financial Reporting Releases: Financial Reporting Releases or FRRs are releases designed to communicate the SEC's positions on accounting principles and auditing practices.

== See also ==
- Regulation S-K
- Proxy statement
- Generally accepted accounting principles
