= Waiting period =

Time between requesting or mandating an action and its occurrence

Abortion Mandatory waiting period laws in the US, as of 2023 or later No mandatory waiting period. Waiting period of 24 hours. Waiting period of 72 hours. No elective abortion.

A waiting period is the period of time between when an action is requested or mandated and when it occurs.

In the United States, the term is commonly used in reference to gun control, abortion and marriage licences, as some U.S. states require a person to wait for a set number of days after buying or reserving a firearm from a dealer before actually taking possession of it, a woman waiting for an abortion and individuals making applications on marriage licences.

Waiting periods are also used for new insurance policies, particularly health insurance, and also flood insurance. Incidents which occur during this time are not claimable. The term may also refer to the time between the making of a claim and the payment of it, also called the elimination period.

In business finance, a waiting period or quiet period is the time in which a company making an initial public offering (IPO) must be silent about it, so as not to inflate the value of the stock artificially. It is also called the cooling-off period. In lean thinking, the period when materials or work in process are waiting for the next stage of the manufacturing process is seen as one of the seven wastes (Japanese term: muda) which do not add value to a product.

Other activities potentially subject to waiting periods include marriage, divorce, abortion access for women, and merger proceedings.

== For firearms purchases ==
A waiting period between purchase and handover of a firearm allows can have several purposes:

- Give the government time to perform a background check. Modern electronic systems such as the National Instant Criminal Background Check System can produce an answer within a few minutes.
- Force a "cooling off" period for any potential buyer who may wish to commit a crime of passion.
- Allow someone contemplating suicide to reconsider their choice. Attempts at suicide by firearm have a higher success rate than most other methods, due to the fast and reliable lethality of carefully placed gunshots.

The Washington Post points to research collected by the Centers for Disease Control and Prevention and various papers expressing a scientific assessment that:

- There is not enough reliable evidence to conclude whether or not a "cooling-off period" reduces homicides
- Evidence indicates that waiting periods reduce the suicide rate, and that people who buy firearms are more likely than the general population to commit suicide (presumably because some are buying them for that purpose)

As of 2015, ten U.S. states and equivalents have mandatory waiting periods, from 1 to 14 days: California, the District of Columbia, Hawaii, Illinois, and Rhode Island for all guns; and Florida, Iowa, Maryland, Minnesota, and New Jersey for handguns only. A 2018 suicide prompted the Vermont legislature to pass a waiting period bill, but it was vetoed by governor Phil Scott in June, 2019. For all firearms Massachusetts, Connecticut and Illinois, and for handguns Nebraska, New York, and North Carolina require purchase permits, which may amount to a de facto waiting period if they are not issued immediately.

== See also ==
- Waiting period (Six-Day War)
- Waiting Period (novel by Hubert Selby Jr. published in 2002)
- Queue (disambiguation)
- Abortion in the United States
- Hunting license
- Time management
