= Fourth market =

Financial trading between two institutions, often in private

Fourth market trading is direct institution-to-institution trading without using the service of broker-dealers, thus avoiding both commissions, and the bid–ask spread. Trades are usually done in blocks. It is impossible to estimate the volume of fourth market activity because trades are not subject to reporting requirements. Studies have suggested that several million shares are traded per day.

== See also ==
- Primary market
- Secondary market
- Third market
- Dark pool
