= Secondary market =

Market in issued financial instruments

The secondary market, also called the aftermarket, is the financial market in which previously issued financial instruments such as shares, bonds, options, and futures are bought and sold. The initial sale of the security by the issuer to a purchaser, who pays proceeds to the issuer, is the primary market. All sales after the initial sale of the security are sales in the secondary market. Whereas the term primary market refers to the market for new issues of securities, and "[a] market is primary if the proceeds of sales go to the issuer of the securities sold," the secondary market in contrast is the market created by the later trading of such securities.

With primary issuances of securities or financial instruments (the primary market), often an underwriter purchases these securities directly from issuers, such as corporations issuing shares in an initial public offering (IPO) or private placement. Then the underwriter re-sells the securities to other buyers (earning a fee), in what is referred to as a secondary market or aftermarket (or a buyer in contrast may buy directly from the federal government, in the case of a government issuing treasuries). Trading in securities that were originally issued a long time ago, where one investor sells to another investor and which have little impact on the company that originated the securities, also happen on the secondary market.

== Forms of secondary market ==
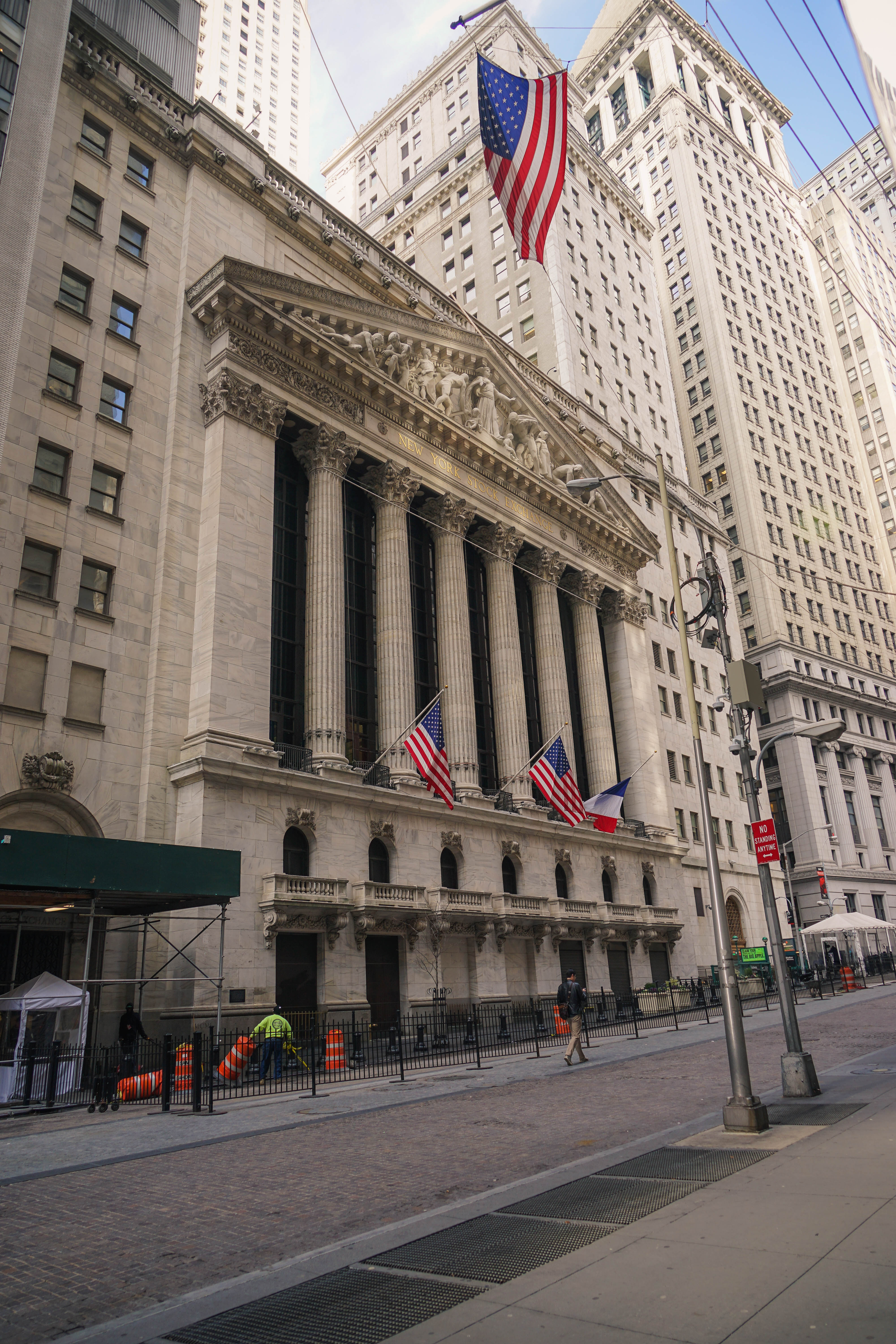
The New York Stock Exchange

The secondary market can be for a variety of assets, that can vary from stocks to loans, from fragmented to centralized, and from illiquid to very liquid.

The major stock exchanges are the most visible example of liquid secondary markets—in this case, for stocks of publicly traded companies. Exchanges such as the New York Stock Exchange, London Stock Exchange, and Nasdaq Stock Market provide centralized, liquid secondary markets for investors who wish to buy or sell stocks that trade on those exchanges. Most bonds and structured products trade "over the counter", or by phoning the bond desk of one's broker-dealer. Loans sometimes trade online, using a loan exchange.

Another usage of "secondary market" is to refer to loans which are sold to investors by a mortgage bank such as Fannie Mae and Freddie Mac. The term "secondary market" is also used to refer to the market for any used goods or assets, or an alternative use for an existing product or asset where the customer base is the second market (for example, corn has been traditionally used primarily for food production and feedstock, but a "second" or "third" market has developed for use in ethanol production).

== Function ==
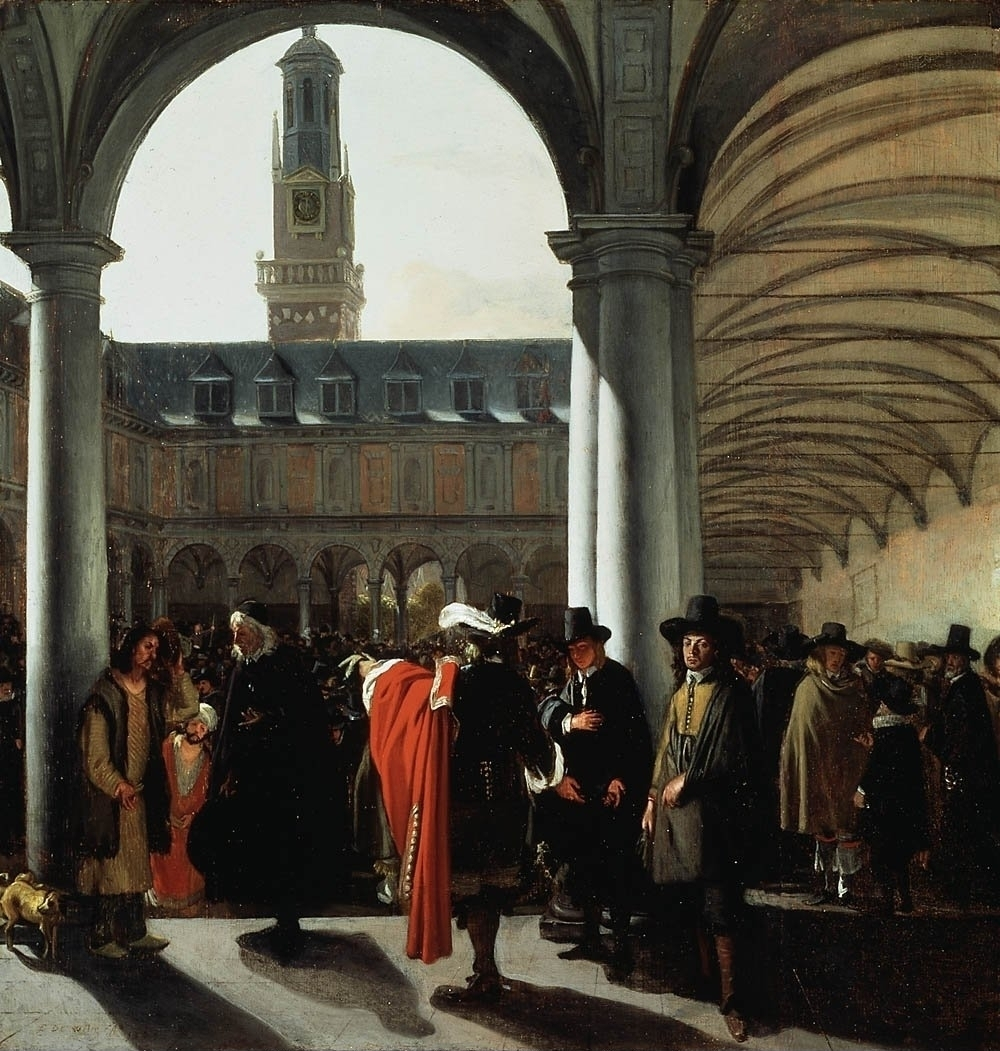
Courtyard of the Amsterdam Stock Exchange (Beurs van Hendrick de Keyser in Dutch) by Emanuel de Witte, 1653.

In the secondary market, securities are sold by and transferred from one buyer to another. It is therefore important that the secondary market be highly liquid. Originally, the only way to create this liquidity was for investors and speculators to meet at a fixed place regularly; this is how stock exchanges originated (see History of the Stock Exchange). As a general rule, the greater the number of investors that participate in a given marketplace, and the greater the centralization of that marketplace, the more liquid the market.

Accurate share price allocates scarce capital more efficiently when new projects are financed through a new primary market offering, but accuracy may also matter in the secondary market because: 1) price accuracy can reduce the agency costs of management, and make hostile takeover a less risky proposition and thus move capital into the hands of better managers; and 2) accurate share price aids the efficient allocation of debt finance whether debt offerings or institutional borrowing.

== Related usage ==
The term may refer to markets in things of value other than securities. For example, the ability to buy and sell intellectual property such as patents, or rights to musical compositions, is considered a secondary market because it allows the owner to freely resell property entitlements issued by the government. Similarly, secondary markets can be said to exist in some real estate contexts as well (e.g., ownership shares of time-share vacation homes are bought and sold outside of the official exchange set up by the timeshare issuers). These have very similar functions as secondary stock and bond markets in allowing for speculation, providing liquidity, and financing through securitization. This facilitates liquidity and marketability of the long-term instrument. It also provides instant valuation of securities caused by changes in the environment.

== Private secondary markets ==
Private-equity secondary market refers to the buying and selling of pre-existing investor commitments to private-equity funds. Sellers of private-equity investments sell not only the investments in the fund, but also their remaining unfunded commitments to the funds.

Due to the increased compliance and reporting obligations on U.S. public company boards of directors and management and public accounting firms enacted in the Sarbanes–Oxley Act of 2002, private secondary markets began to emerge, such as SecondMarket and SecondaryLink. These markets are generally only available to institutional or accredited investors, and allow trading of unregistered and private company securities.

== See also ==
- Aftermarket (automotive)
- Grey market
- Primary market
- Third market
- Fourth market
- Original equipment manufacturer (OEM)
- Reseller
