= Smaller reporting company =

The U.S. Securities and Exchange Commission divides reporting companies, those that file periodic reports under the Securities Exchange Act of 1934, into different categories based on size, among other factors.

Smaller companies have less stringent reporting obligations, provide less historical financial information, are exempt from some provisions of the Sarbanes–Oxley Act of 2002, and have more time to file their reports. The smallest category is Smaller Reporting Company. A Smaller Reporting Company will qualify as such if, as of the last business day of its second fiscal quarter, it has a public float of less than $250 million. Public float is defined as the shares of the company's publicly traded common stock that is not held by management and certain large investors. Not all companies that file reports under the Securities Exchange Act of 1934 are publicly traded, and so if a company cannot calculate its public float, then an alternative way to be a Smaller Reporting Company is to have annual revenue of $100 million or less. Companies are required to do the analysis each year following their second fiscal quarter and, after a transition period, are then required to file accordingly.
