= Underwriting contract =

Contract between an underwriter and an issuer of securities

In investment banking, an underwriting contract is a contract between an underwriter and an issuer of securities.

The following types of underwriting contracts are the most common:

- In the firm commitment contract, the underwriter guarantees the sale of the issued stock at the agreed-upon price. For the issuer, it is the safest but the most expensive type of the contracts, since the underwriter takes the risk of sale.
- In the best efforts contract, the underwriter agrees to sell as many shares as possible at the agreed-upon price.
- Under the all-or-none contract, the underwriter agrees either to sell the entire offering or to cancel the deal.

Stand-by underwriting, also known as strict underwriting or old-fashioned underwriting, is a form of stock insurance: the issuer contracts the underwriter for the latter to purchase the shares the issuer failed to sell under stockholders' subscription and applications.
