= Initial public offering =

Type of securities offering in which a private company goes public

An initial public offering (IPO) or stock launch is a public offering in which shares of a company are sold to institutional investors and usually also to retail investors. An IPO is typically underwritten by one or more investment banks, who also arrange for the shares to be listed on one or more stock exchanges. Through this process, colloquially known as floating or going public, a privately held company is transformed into a public company. IPOs can be used to raise new equity capital for companies, to monetize the investments of private shareholders such as company founders or private equity investors, and to enable easy trading of existing holdings or future capital raising by becoming publicly traded.

When a company becomes publicly listed, the money paid by the investing public for the newly issued shares goes directly to the company (primary offering) as well as to any early private investors who opt to sell all or a portion of their holdings (secondary offerings) as part of the larger IPO. An IPO, therefore, allows a company to tap into a wide pool of potential investors to provide itself with capital for future growth, repayment of debt, or working capital.

After the IPO, shares are traded freely in the open market at what is known as the free float. The market value of a company after an IPO is determined by the share price multiplied by the total number of outstanding shares, commonly referred to as market capitalization. Stock exchanges stipulate a minimum free float both in absolute terms (the total value as determined by the share price multiplied by the number of shares sold to the public) and as a proportion of the total share capital (i.e., the number of shares sold to the public divided by the total shares outstanding). Although IPO offers many benefits, there are also significant costs involved, chiefly those associated with the process such as banking and legal fees, and the ongoing requirement to disclose important and sometimes sensitive information.

Details of the proposed offering are disclosed to potential purchasers in the form of a lengthy document known as a prospectus. Most companies undertake an IPO with the assistance of an investment banking firm acting in the capacity of an underwriter. Underwriters provide several services, including help with correctly assessing the value of shares (share price) and establishing a public market for shares (initial sale). Alternative methods such as the Dutch auction have also been explored and applied for several IPOs.

== History ==
The earliest form of a company which issued public shares was the case of the publicani during the Roman Republic, although this claim is not shared by all modern scholars. Like modern joint-stock companies, the publicani were legal bodies independent of their members whose ownership was divided into shares, or parts. There is evidence that these shares were sold to public investors and traded in a type of over-the-counter market in the Forum, near the Temple of Castor and Pollux. The shares fluctuated in value, encouraging the activity of speculators, or quaestors. Little evidence remains of the prices for which parts were sold, the nature of initial public offerings, or a description of stock market behavior. Publicani lost favor with the fall of the Republic and the rise of the Empire.

In the United States, the first IPO was the public offering of Bank of North America around 1783.

== Procedure ==
IPO procedures are governed by different laws in different countries. In the United States, IPOs are regulated by the United States Securities and Exchange Commission under the Securities Act of 1933. In the United Kingdom, the Financial Conduct Authority, which formerly performed this role under the name UK Listing Authority, reviews and approves prospectuses and operates the listing regime.

=== Planning ===
Planning is crucial to a successful IPO. Following highlights some general steps to planning (simplified, may have more steps):

1. develop impressive management and professional team
2. grow the company's business with an eye to the public marketplace
3. obtain audited financial statements using IPO-accepted accounting principles
4. clean up the company's act
5. establish antitakeover defenses
6. develop good corporate governance
7. create insider bail-out opportunities and take advantage of IPO windows.

=== Retention of underwriters ===
IPOs generally involve one or more investment banks known as "underwriters". The company offering its shares, called the "issuer", enters into a contract with a lead underwriter to sell its shares to the public. The underwriter then approaches investors with offers to sell those shares.

A large IPO is usually underwritten by a "syndicate" of investment banks, the largest of which take the position of "lead underwriter". Upon selling the shares, the underwriters retain a portion of the proceeds as their fee. This fee is called an underwriting spread. The spread is calculated as a discount from the price of the shares sold (called the gross spread). Components of an underwriting spread in an initial public offering (IPO) typically include the following (on a per-share basis): manager's fee, underwriting fee—earned by members of the syndicate, and the concession—earned by the broker-dealer selling the shares. The manager would be entitled to the entire underwriting spread. A member of the syndicate is entitled to the underwriting fee and the concession. A broker-dealer who is not a member of the syndicate but sells shares would receive only the concession, while the member of the syndicate who provided the shares to that broker-dealer would retain the underwriting fee. Usually, the managing/lead underwriter, also known as the bookrunner, typically the underwriter selling the largest proportions of the IPO, takes the highest portion of the gross spread, up to 6-8% in some cases.

Multinational IPOs may have many syndicates to deal with differing legal requirements in both the issuer's domestic market and other regions. For example, an issuer based in the E.U. may be represented by the major selling syndicate in its domestic market, Europe, in addition to separate group corporations or selling them for US/Canada and Asia. Usually, the lead underwriter in the head selling group is also the lead bank in the other selling groups.

Because of the wide array of legal requirements and because it is an expensive process, IPOs also typically involve one or more law firms with major practices in securities law, such as the Magic Circle firms of London and the white-shoe firms of New York City.

Financial historians Richard Sylla and Robert E. Wright have shown that before 1860 most early U.S. corporations sold shares in themselves directly to the public without the aid of intermediaries like investment banks. The direct public offering (DPO), as they term it, was not done by auction but rather at a share price set by the issuing corporation. In this sense, it is the same as the fixed price public offers that were the traditional IPO method in most non-US countries in the early 1990s. The DPO eliminated the agency problem associated with offerings intermediated by investment banks.

=== Allocation and pricing ===
The sale (allocation and pricing) of shares in an IPO may take several forms. Common methods include:

- Best efforts contract
- Firm commitment contract
- All-or-none contract
- Bought deal

Public offerings are sold to both institutional investors and retail clients of the underwriters. A licensed securities salesperson (Registered Representative in the US and Canada) selling shares of a public offering to their clients is paid a portion of the selling concession (the fee paid by the issuer to the underwriter) rather than by their client. In some situations, when the IPO is not a "hot" issue (undersubscribed), and where the salesperson is the client's advisor, it is possible that the financial incentives of the advisor and client may not be aligned.

The issuer usually allows the underwriters an option to increase the size of the offering by up to 15% under a specific circumstance known as the greenshoe or overallotment option. This option is typically exercised when the offering is considered a "hot" issue, by virtue of being oversubscribed.

In the US, clients are given a preliminary prospectus, known as a red herring prospectus, during the initial quiet period. The red herring prospectus is so named because of a bold red warning statement printed on its front cover. The warning states that the offering information is incomplete, and may be changed. The actual wording can vary, although most roughly follow the format exhibited on the Facebook IPO red herring. During the quiet period, the shares cannot be offered for sale. Brokers can, however, take indications of interest from their clients. At the time of the stock launch, after the Registration Statement has become effective, indications of interest can be converted to buy orders, at the discretion of the buyer. Sales can only be made through a final prospectus cleared by the Securities and Exchange Commission.

The final step in preparing and filing the final IPO prospectus is for the issuer to retain one of the major financial "printers", who print (and today, also electronically file with the SEC) the registration statement on Form S-1. Typically, preparation of the final prospectus is actually performed at the printer, wherein one of their multiple conference rooms the issuer, issuer's counsel (attorneys), underwriter's counsel (attorneys), the lead underwriter(s), and the issuer's accountants/auditors make final edits and proofreading, concluding with the filing of the final prospectus by the financial printer with the Securities and Exchange Commission.

Before legal actions initiated by New York Attorney General Eliot Spitzer, which later became known as the Global Settlement enforcement agreement, some large investment firms had initiated favorable research coverage of companies in an effort to aid corporate finance departments and retail divisions engaged in the marketing of new issues. The central issue in that enforcement agreement had been judged in court previously. It involved the conflict of interest between the investment banking and analysis departments of ten of the largest investment firms in the United States. The investment firms involved in the settlement had all engaged in actions and practices that had allowed the inappropriate influence of their research analysts by their investment bankers seeking lucrative fees. A typical violation addressed by the settlement was the case of CSFB and Salomon Smith Barney, which were alleged to have engaged in the inappropriate spinning of "hot" IPOs and issued fraudulent research reports in violation of various sections within the Securities Exchange Act of 1934.

=== Pricing ===
A company planning an IPO typically appoints a lead manager, known as a bookrunner, to help it arrive at an appropriate price at which the shares should be offered. There are two primary ways in which the price of an IPO can be determined. Either the company, with the help of its lead managers, fixes a price ("fixed price method"), or the price can be determined through analysis of confidential investor demand data compiled by the bookrunner ("book building").

Historically, many IPOs have been underpriced. The effect of underpricing an IPO is to generate additional interest in the stock and a rapid rise in share price when it first becomes publicly traded (known as an "IPO pop"). Flipping, or quickly selling shares for a profit, can lead to significant gains for investors who were allocated shares of the IPO at the offering price. However, underpricing an IPO results in lost potential capital for the issuer. One extreme example is theglobe.com IPO which helped fuel the IPO "mania" of the late 1990s internet era. Underwritten by Bear Stearns on 13 November 1998, the IPO was priced at $9 per share. The share price quickly increased nearly 1,000% on the opening day of trading, to a high of $97. Selling pressure from institutional flipping eventually drove the stock back down, and it closed the day at $63. Although the company did raise about $30 million from the offering, it is estimated that with the level of demand for the offering and the volume of trading that took place they might have left upwards of $200 million on the table.

The danger of overpricing is also an important consideration. If a stock is offered to the public at a higher price than the market will pay, the underwriters may have trouble meeting their commitments to sell shares. Even if they sell all of the issued shares, the stock may fall in value on the first day of trading. If so, the stock may lose its marketability and hence even more of its value. This could result in losses for investors, many of whom being the most favored clients of the underwriters. Perhaps the best-known example of this is the Facebook IPO in 2012.

Underwriters, therefore, take many factors into consideration when pricing an IPO, and attempt to reach an offering price that is low enough to stimulate interest in the stock but high enough to raise an adequate amount of capital for the company. When pricing an IPO, underwriters use a variety of key performance indicators and non-GAAP measures. The process of determining an optimal price usually involves the underwriters ("syndicate") arranging share purchase commitments from leading institutional investors.

Some researchers (Friesen & Swift, 2009) believe that the underpricing of IPOs is less a deliberate act on the part of issuers and/or underwriters, and more the result of an over-reaction on the part of investors. One potential method for determining to underprice is through the use of IPO underpricing algorithms. Other researchers have discovered that firms with higher revenues from licensing-based technology commercialization exhibit greater IPO underpricing, while a firm's stock of patents mitigates this effect.

==== Dutch auction ====
A Dutch auction allows shares of an initial public offering to be allocated based only on price aggressiveness, with all successful bidders paying the same price per share. One version of the Dutch auction is OpenIPO, which is based on an auction system designed by economist William Vickrey. This auction method ranks bids from highest to lowest, then accepts the highest bids that allow all shares to be sold, with all winning bidders paying the same price. It is similar to the model used to auction Treasury bills, notes, and bonds since the 1990s. Before this, Treasury bills were auctioned through a discriminatory or pay-what-you-bid auction, in which the various winning bidders each paid the price (or yield) they bid, and thus the various winning bidders did not all pay the same price. Both discriminatory and uniform price or "Dutch" auctions have been used for IPOs in many countries, although only uniform price auctions have been used so far in the US. Large IPO auctions include Japan Tobacco, Singapore Telecom, BAA Plc and Google (ordered by size of proceeds).

A variation of the Dutch auction has been used to take a number of U.S. companies public including Morningstar, Interactive Brokers Group, Overstock.com, Ravenswood Winery, Clean Energy Fuels, and Boston Beer Company. In 2004, Google used the Dutch auction system for its initial public offering. Traditional U.S. investment banks have shown resistance to the idea of using an auction process to engage in public securities offerings. The auction method allows for equal access to the allocation of shares and eliminates the favorable treatment accorded important clients by the underwriters in conventional IPOs. In the face of this resistance, the Dutch auction is still a little used method in U.S. public offerings, although there have been hundreds of auction IPOs in other countries.

In determining the success or failure of a Dutch auction, one must consider competing objectives. If the objective is to reduce risk, a traditional IPO may be more effective because the underwriter manages the process, rather than leaving the outcome in part to random chance in terms of who chooses to bid or what strategy each bidder chooses to follow. From the viewpoint of the investor, the Dutch auction allows everyone equal access. Moreover, some forms of the Dutch auction allow the underwriter to be more active in coordinating bids and even communicating general auction trends to some bidders during the bidding period. Some have also argued that a uniform price auction is more effective at price discovery, although the theory behind this is based on the assumption of independent private values (that the value of IPO shares to each bidder is entirely independent of their value to others, even though the shares will shortly be traded on the aftermarket). Theory that incorporates assumptions more appropriate to IPOs does not find that sealed bid auctions are an effective form of price discovery, although possibly some modified form of auction might give a better result.

In addition to the extensive international evidence that auctions have not been popular for IPOs, there is no U.S. evidence to indicate that the Dutch auction fares any better than the traditional IPO in an unwelcoming market environment. A Dutch auction IPO by WhiteGlove Health, Inc., announced in May 2011 was postponed in September of that year, after several failed attempts to price. An article in the Wall Street Journal cited the reasons as "broader stock-market volatility and uncertainty about the global economy have made investors wary of investing in new stocks".

=== Quiet period ===
Under American securities law, there are two time windows commonly referred to as "quiet periods" during an IPO. The first and the one linked above is the period of time following the filing of the company's S-1 but before SEC staff declare the registration statement effective. During this time, issuers, company insiders, analysts, and other parties are legally restricted in their ability to discuss or promote the upcoming IPO (U.S. Securities and Exchange Commission, 2005).

The other "quiet period" refers to a period of 10 calendar days following an IPO's first day of public trading. During this time, insiders and any underwriters involved in the IPO are restricted from issuing any earnings forecasts or research reports for the company. When the quiet period is over, generally the underwriters will initiate research coverage on the firm. A three-day waiting period exists for any member that has acted as a manager or co-manager in a secondary offering.

=== Delivery of shares ===
Not all IPOs are eligible for delivery settlement through the DTC system, which would then either require the physical delivery of the stock certificates to the clearing agent bank's custodian or a delivery versus payment (DVP) arrangement with the selling group firm.

=== Stag profit (flipping) ===
"Stag profit" is a situation in the stock market before and immediately after a company's initial public offering (or any new issue of shares). A "stag" is a party or individual who subscribes to the new issue expecting the price of the stock to rise immediately upon the start of trading. Thus, stag profit is the financial gain accumulated by the party or individual resulting from the value of the shares rising. This term is more popular in the United Kingdom than in the United States. In the US, such investors are usually called flippers, because they get shares in the offering and then immediately turn around "flipping" or selling them on the first day of trading.

== Largest IPOs by amount raised ==
Company	Year	Amount (USD billions)	
Company	Year	Nominal	Inflation-adjusted
Anthropic	2026	81.3	81.3
SpaceX	2026	75.0	75.0
SK Hynix	2026	26.5	26.5
Saudi Aramco	2019	25.6	32.2
Alibaba Group	2014	21.8	29.6
SoftBank Corp.	2018	21.3	27.3
Agricultural Bank of China	2010	19.2	28.3
Industrial and Commercial Bank of China	2006	19.1	30.5
NTT Docomo	1998	18.1	35.8
Visa Inc.	2008	17.9	26.8
American International Assurance	2010	17.8	26.3
Enel	1999	16.4	31.7
Facebook	2012	16.0	22.4
General Motors	2010	15.8	23.3

== Largest IPO markets ==
Prior to 2009, the United States was the leading issuer of IPOs in terms of total value.

Year	Stock exchange	Proceeds (in bn USD)
2009	Hong Kong Stock Exchange	
2010	Hong Kong Stock Exchange	
2011	Hong Kong Stock Exchange	
2012	New York Stock Exchange	
2013	New York Stock Exchange	
2014	New York Stock Exchange	
2015	Hong Kong Stock Exchange	
2016	Hong Kong Stock Exchange	25.2
2017	New York Stock Exchange	29.4
2018	Hong Kong Stock Exchange	31.2
2019	Hong Kong Stock Exchange	40.4
2020	Nasdaq	57.8
2021	Nasdaq	100.6
2022	Shanghai Stock Exchange	56.5
2023	Shanghai Stock Exchange	31.3
2024	National Stock Exchange of India	20.3
2025	Hong Kong Stock Exchange	36.9
2026 Mid-Year	Nasdaq	113.4

U.S. IPOs raised a record $104.8 billion in the second quarter of 2026, largely thanks to SpaceX's major public listing. SpaceX's listing played a big role in the quarter's record IPO fundraising.

== See also ==
- Alternative public offering
- Direct public offering
- Public offering without listing
- Reverse takeover
- Smaller reporting company
- Special-purpose acquisition company
- Venture capital
