= Quiet period =

Form of securities law

In United States securities law, a quiet period is a period of time in which companies refrain from communicating with investors to avoid unfairly disclosing material, non-public information to certain investors when the company has not yet publicly communicated this information.

When a company is raising capital from the public, the quiet period has "historically [meant], a quiet period of time extended from the time a company files a registration statement with the SEC until SEC staff declared the registration statement effective. During that period, the federal securities laws limited what information a company and related parties can release to the public." This is also called the cooling-off period or waiting period. Under the rules of the Securities Act of 1933, as modified June 29, 2005, electronic communications, including electronic road shows and information located on or hyperlinked to an issuer's website are also governed. The rules changes of June 29, 2005, also included various changes which "liberalize permitted offering activity and communications to allow more information" for certain qualifying organizations.

The quiet period also means the period starting late in the third month of each quarter and ending on the day a public company announces its quarterly results.

== Guidelines ==
During a Quiet Period, a publicly listed company cannot make any announcements about anything that could cause a normal investor to change their position on the company's stock. Normally, that means the company does not discuss any of the following:

- New deals or wins signed in that current quarter. Announcements about previously sold implementations going live are allowed but must be explicitly described as such.
- Management changes
- Progress against company goals
- Major product or service announcements
- Major partnership announcements

== See also ==
- Waiting period
