= Standstill period =

The Alcatel mandatory standstill period is a period of at least ten calendar days following the notification of an award decision in a contract tendered via the Official Journal of the European Union, before the contract is signed with the successful supplier(s). Its purpose is to allow unsuccessful bidders to challenge the decision before the contract is signed. It is named after a pair of linked European Court of Justice cases which are jointly known as the Alcatel case (Case C-81/98). Under EU law a statutory "standstill period" was introduced by the Remedies Directive as amended in 2007. Within the UK, it was introduced by the Office of Government Commerce in 2005 and remained within UK contract award legislation under regulation 87 of the Public Contracts Regulations 2015 and regulation 86 of the Public Contracts (Scotland) Regulations 2015, even after the UK withdrew from the European Union.

The timelines given below are the minimum (of at least 10 days) under the 'Alcatel' mandatory standstill period and show the days by which specific actions by the contracting authority (ie notify all tenderers of the award decision and the completion of any requested additional de-briefing) and by the tenderer (ie a request for additional de-briefing within the standstill period), and in order to comply with the minimum period before entering into a contract (assuming no legal challenges are formally notified).

Where a legal challenge has been filed in the High Court (Court of Session or Sheriff Court in Scotland), the starting of those proceedings "automatically" requires the contracting authority to refrain from entering into a contract until the proceedings are resolved or the court lifts the suspension. Regulation 96(5) in the UK regulations also stipulates that the court cannot issue an order lifting or modifying the suspension until the standstill period has ended.

Legislative provision for both mandatory and (in certain circumstances) voluntary standstill periods in UK public procurement is now set out in Section 51 of the Procurement Act 2023, which came into effect on 24 February 2025.

== Timeline ==
Action

- Day 0 Notify tenderers of decision and intention to award contract on or after 'date'
- Day 1
- Day 2 Tenderers must request additional debriefing (by phone, email, fax) before end of day (midnight)
- Day 3
- Day 4
- Day 5
- Day 6
- Day 7 Additional de-briefings must be completed before end of day (midnight) *
- Day 8
- Day 9
- Day 10 End of minimum standstill period **

The contract may be concluded if no legal challenge has been notified.

* If there is a delay in completing the requested additional de-briefings, the end-date of the standstill period must be extended to ensure 3 full working days between the last de-brief and the end of the standstill period remembering that the last day must be a working day.

** The end of a standstill period must not fall on a public holiday or at the weekend. Day 10 ends at midnight on that day.

A voluntary standstill period in the UK may not run for less than eight working days.

== Notes ==
1. Depending on the day of the initial notification of the intention of the contract award decision, given the very tight timescales for the additional debriefing, it may be more practical to extend the end-date of the standstill period beyond the minimum of 10 calendar days.
2. The 'traditional' de-briefing requirement (within 15 days of receiving a written request) remains where a tenderer does not seek an additional de-briefing within the first 2 working days of the standstill period. In any case, all tenderers can make formal complaints in Court within the standstill period regardless of having requested or received debriefing within the standstill period and Courts can agree to grant interim measures preventing contract award.
