= Issuer =

Legal entity that develops securities

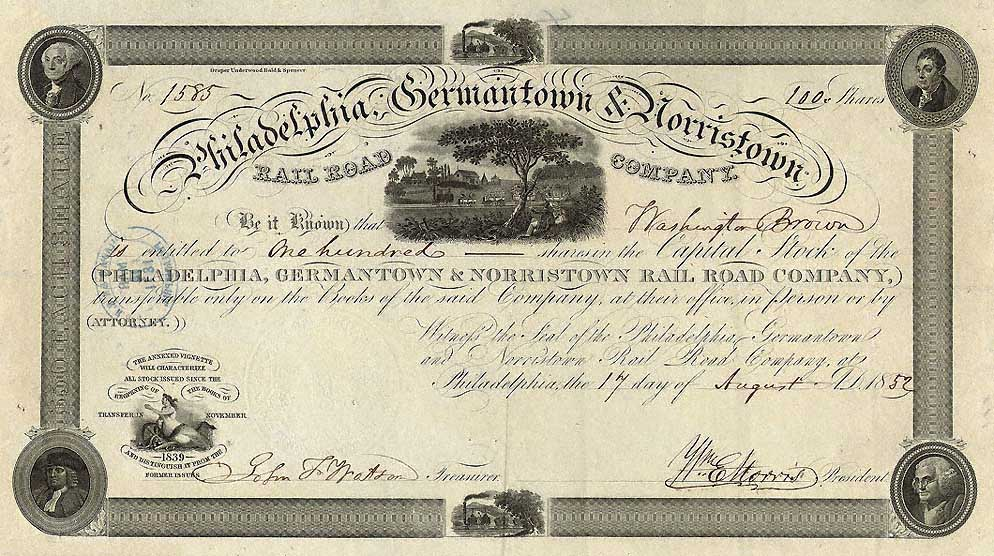
Stock certificate issued by the Philadelphia, Germantown & Norristown Railroad, 1852

Issuer is a legal entity that develops, registers and sells securities to finance its operations.

Issuers may be governments, corporations, investment trusts or special-purpose vehicles. They are legally responsible for the obligations attached to the issue and for reporting their financial condition, material developments and other operational matters as required by the regulations of their jurisdiction.

The most common types of securities issued are equities: common and preferred stocks, and debt: bonds, notes, debentures, and bills.

In the United States, the term "issuer" is defined by Section 2(4) of the Securities Act of 1933 as follows:

The term "issuer" means every person who issues or proposes to issue any security; except that with respect to certificates of deposit, voting-trust certificates, or collateral-trust certificates, or with respect to certificates of interest or shares in an unincorporated investment trust not having a board of directors (or persons performing similar functions) or of the fixed, restricted management, or unit type, the term "issuer" means the person or persons performing the acts and assuming the duties of depositor or manager pursuant to the provisions of the trust or other agreement or instrument under which such securities are issued; except that in the case of an unincorporated association which provides by its articles for limited liability of any or all of its members, or in the case of a trust, committee, or other legal entity, the trustees or members thereof shall not be individually liable as issuers of any security issued by the association, trust, committee, or other legal entity; except that with respect to equipment-trust certificates or like securities, the term "issuer" means the person by whom the equipment or property is or is to be used; and except that with respect to fractional undivided interests in oil, gas, or other mineral rights, the term "issuer" means the owner of any such right or of any interest in such right (whether whole or fractional) who creates fractional interests therein for the purpose of public offering. Securities Act of 1933, § 2(a)(4), 15 U.S.C. § 77B(a)(4).

== See also ==
- Issuing bank
- Bond market
- Security (finance)
- Securities market
- Securities market participants (United States)
- Stock market
