= 1941 in Nordic music =

The following is a list of notable events and compositions of the year 1941 in Nordic music.

== Events ==
- March – Jón Leifs performs his Organ Concerto in Berlin with the Berlin Philharmonic. The work is condemned by critics and is so badly received by the audience that it is not performed in public again during his lifetime.

== New works ==
- Kurt Atterberg – Aladdin (opera)
- Vagn Holmboe
  - Symphony No. 3, "Sinfonia rustica"
  - Symphony No. 4, "Sinfonia sacra"

== Popular music ==
- Lasse Dahlquist
  - "De' ä' dans på Brännö brygga"
  - "Hallå du gamle indian"
- Evert Taube – "Sjösala vals"

== Film music ==
- Jolly Kramer-Johansen & Jens Larsen – Hansen og Hansen

== Musical films ==
- Alle gaar rundt og forelsker sig, starring Lilian Ellis, with music by Kai Normann Andersen

== Births ==
- 6 March – Palle Mikkelborg, Danish jazz trumpeter
- 12 March – Erkki Salmenhaara, Finnish composer (died 2002)
- 22 March – Hugo Rasmussen, Danish jazz bassist (died 2015)
- 7 May – Lars Sjösten, Swedish jazz pianist (died 2015)
- 27 May – Teppo Hauta-aho, Finnish double bassist and composer (died 2021)
- 18 September – Hafliði Hallgrímsson, Icelandic composer
- unknown date – Else Paaske, Danish operatic mezzo-soprano

== Deaths ==
- 27 January – Iver Holter, Norwegian musician and bandleader, Norwegian Army Band (born 1850)
- 18 April – Harald Steen, Norwegian tenor and actor (born 1886)
- 3 May – Selma Ek, Swedish operatic soprano (born 1856)
- 1 May – Julia Claussen, Swedish operatic mezzo-soprano (born 1879)
- 3 December – Christian Sinding, Norwegian composer (born 1856)

== See also ==
- 1941 in Denmark
- 1941 in Iceland
- 1941 in Norwegian music
- 1941 in Sweden
