= 1944 in Nordic music =

The following is a list of notable events and compositions of the year 1944 in Nordic music.

== Events ==
- 4 August – The Swedish inhabitants of the island of Ruhnu (Runö) are evacuated to make way for the Soviet occupation. Some of their folk traditions, including music, are recorded for posterity.
- unknown date
  - John Fernström begins working as a composer for the Malmö stadsteater (the Malmö city theatre).
  - King Frederik IX of Denmark is recorded conducting the Orchestra of the Royal Danish Theatre.

== New works ==
- Jørgen Bentzon – Saturnalia (opera)
- Klaus Egge – Concerto for piano and orchestra No. 2, "Symfoniske variasjoner og fuge over en norsk folketone", Op. 21
- Elisabeth Huselius-Wickter – I ensamhet och tystnad
- Vagn Holmboe – Symphony No. 5
- David Wikander – Passacaglia över koralen Jag ville lova och prisa

== Popular music ==
- Lasse Dahlquist – "Gå upp och pröva dina vingar"
- Juul Strømme & Rolf Holst – "Farvel Finnmark"

== Musical theatre ==
- Song of Norway adapted by Robert Wright and George Forrest from the work of Edvard Grieg

== Film music ==
- Sven Gyldmark
  - Elly Petersen
  - Teatertosset
- Hilding Rosenberg – Torment
- Jules Sylvain – Räkna de lyckliga stunderna blott

== Births ==
- 2 March – Leif Segerstam, Finnish composer and conductor (died 2024)
- 7 June – Erling Wicklund, Swedish-Norwegian trombonist and composer (died 2019)
- 1 October – Yngvar Numme, Norwegian singer, actor, revue writer and director (died 2023)
- 14 November – Niels la Cour, Danish composer
- 1 December – Arja Saijonmaa, Finnish singer and actress

== Deaths ==
- 2 March – Johanne Stockmarr, Danish pianist (born 1869)
- 1 April – Sandra Droucker, Norwegian pianist, composer and radio personality (born 1875)
- 7 July – Emil Thoroddsen, Icelandic composer (born 1898)
- 8 August – Aino Ackté, Finnish operatic soprano (born 1876)
- 18 November – Per Biørn, Danish operatic baritone (born 1887)

== See also ==
- 1944 in Denmark
- 1944 in Iceland
- 1944 in Norwegian music
- 1944 in Sweden
