= Boi =

Boi or BOI may refer to:

== People ==
=== Given name ===
- Boi Faltings (born 1960), Swiss professor
- Boi Lemingon (born 1968), Filipino musician
- Boi, one of the Catalan forms of the name Baudilus

=== Surname ===
- Francesco Antonio Boi (1767–1850), Sardinian physician
- Frederik Boi (born 1981), Belgian footballer
- Ludovic Boi (born 1989), Mauritian footballer
- James Maina Boi (1954–2004), Kenyan middle-distance runner
- Nani Boi, Nigerian writer
- Paolo Boi (1528–1598), Italian chess player
- Stevie Boi, American fashion designer

=== Nickname ===
- Big Boi (born 1975), rapper
- Boi-1da (born 1986), Canadian hip-hop producer

== Places ==
- Boí, a village in Catalonia, Spain
- Boi, Abbottabad, a village and union council in Pakistan
- Sant Boi de Llobregat, a town near Barcelona, Spain
- Sant Boi de Lluçanès, a town in Osona, Catalonia
- Boise Airport (IATA: BOI, FAA LID: BOI), an airport in the US state of Idaho

== Organizations ==
- The Bank of Industry (BOI), Nigeria's oldest development finance institution
- Board of Investment of Mauritius, the investment promotion agency of Mauritius
- Pakistan Board of Investment, the investment promotion agency of Pakistan
- Board of Investment (Sri Lanka), the investment promotion agency of Sri Lanka
- Board of Investments (Philippines), the investment promotion agency of the Philippines
- Bureau of Investigation, a bureau of the U.S. Dept. of Justice, became the Federal Bureau of Investigation in 1935
- Bank of Ireland, one of Ireland's largest commercial banks
- Bank of India, one of India's largest commercial banks
- Thailand Board of Investment, an agency of the Government of Thailand to promote investment in Thailand

== Music and film ==
- "Sk8er Boi", a 2002 song by Avril Lavigne
- Boi (music), a style of Central Amazon folk music
- Boi (film), a 2019 Spanish thriller

== Other ==
- BOI, the ICAO code for 2GO
- Boi (slang), as a spelling that is deliberately altered for reasons of gender identification, sexuality, or group affinity
- Bôi River, Vietnam
- Dat Boi, an internet meme that features an animated frog riding a red unicycle
- Canal do Boi, a Brazilian television channel

== See also ==
- Boy (disambiguation)
- Sant Boi (disambiguation)
- Boii, an Iron Age Gallic tribe
- Boii (genus)
