= Bois =

Bois may refer to:

- Bois, Charente-Maritime, France
- Bois, West Virginia, United States
- Bois d'Arc, Texas, United States
- Les Bois, Switzerland
- Boll- och Idrottssällskap (Ball and Athletics Association), a Swedish sports club suffix
  - Landskrona BoIS
  - Tranås BoIS
  - Varbergs BoIS
- Bois (Pokémon), a Heracross obtainable in Pokémon Legends: Z-A

== People with the surname Bois ==
- Cécile Bois (born 1971), French actress
- Curt Bois (1901–1991), German actor
- Daniel Bois (born 1984), Canadian racing driver
- Danny Bois (born 1983), Canadian ice hockey player
- Désiré Georges Jean Marie Bois (1856–1946), French botanist
- Guy Bois (1934–2019), French historian
- John Bois (1560–1643), English scholar
- Jon Bois (born 1982), American sportswriter
- Mathieu Bois (born 1988), Canadian swimmer
- Rob du Bois (1934–2013), Dutch composer and jurist

== See also ==
- Boise (disambiguation)
- Boy (disambiguation)
- Dubois (disambiguation)
- Grand Bois (disambiguation)
- Petit Bois (disambiguation)
