= 2002 in Nordic music =

The following is a list of notable events and releases that happened in Nordic music in 2002.

== Events ==
- 6 February – Magnus Lindberg's Parada receives its world première a t The Anvil, Basingstoke, with the Philharmonia Orchestra conducted by Esa-Pekka Salonen, to whom the work is dedicated.
- 22 March – The Vossajazz festival opens in Norway. Thomas T. Dahl is awarded the Vossajazzprisen.
- 25 May – Denmark's competitor, one of the favourites to win, finishes last in Eurovision Song Contest, with only 7 points. Sweden is the top-placed of the Scandinavian countries, finishing 8th, and Finland finish 20th.
- 11 September – Marie Fredriksson of Roxette is injured after collapsing at home, leading to the discovery of a brain tumour.
- 4 October — Frederik Magle's latest work, Dåbens Pagt (Pact of the Baptism) is premiered at the christening of Prince Felix of Denmark.
- 11 December – The Nobel Peace Prize Concert is held at the Oslo Spektrum. Performers include A-ha, Willie Nelson and Laura Pausini.
- unknown date – Finnish cellist Susanna Mälkki becomes the first female Chief Conductor of Norway's Stavanger Symphony Orchestra.

== Classical works ==
- Kalevi Aho – Flute Concerto
- Magnus Lindberg – Clarinet Concerto
- Esa-Pekka Salonen – Insomnia

== Film/TV scores ==
- Anggun, Jesper Winge Leisner and Niels Brinck – Open Hearts
- Hilmar Örn Hilmarsson – Falcons
- Stefan Nilsson – A Song for Martin

== Popular music ==
- Afro-dite – "Never Let It Go" (#1 Sweden)
- A-ha – "Forever Not Yours" (#1 Norway, Poland)
- Brandsta City Släckers – "Kom och ta mig" (#4 Sweden).
- Children of Bodom – "You're Better Off Dead!" (#1 Finland)
- Kent – "FF / VinterNoll2" (#2 Sweden, #9 Norway, #10 Finland)
- Kotipelto – "Beginning" (#4 Finland)
- Lordi – "Would You Love a Monsterman?" (#1 Finland)
- Ulf Lundell – ""S:t Monica"

== Eurovision Song Contest ==
- Denmark in the Eurovision Song Contest 2002
- Finland in the Eurovision Song Contest 2002
- Sweden in the Eurovision Song Contest 2002

== Births ==
- 21 February – Marcus & Martinus, Norwegian twin brother pop-dance duo
- 12 May – Birgitta Elisa Oftestad, Norwegian cellist
- 5 September
  - Einár, Swedish rapper (died 2021)
  - Alessandra Mele, Italian-Norwegian singer

== Deaths ==
- 2 January – Armi Aavikko, Finnish pop singer and beauty queen (born 1958)
- 17 January – Eddie Meduza, Swedish rockabilly musician and songwriter (born 1948; heart attack)
- 1 February – Sigurd Berge, Norwegian composer (born 1929).
- 19 March
  - Erkki Salmenhaara, Finnish composer and musicologist (born 1941)
  - Egil Storbekken, Norwegian folk musician, flautist, and composer (born 1911)
- 6 May – Bjørn Johansen, Norwegian saxophonist (born 1940)
- 6 June – Yat Malmgren, Swedish dancer (born 1916)
- 7 June – Signe Hasso, Swedish actress, writer and composer, translator of Swedish folk songs (born 1915)
- 18 June – Stein Ove Berg, Norwegian singer and songwriter (born 1948)
- 23 October – Nathan Görling, Swedish film score composer (born 1905)
- 22 November – Arne Mellnäs, Swedish composer (born 1933)
