= Boys (disambiguation) =

Boys are young male humans.

Boys or The Boys may also refer to:

== Film and television ==
=== Films ===
- The Boys (1962 British film), a courtroom drama by Sidney J. Furie
- The Boys (1962 Finnish film), a war drama by Mikko Niskanen
- Boys (1977 film), a Danish film by Nils Malmros
- Boys (1983 film), a Soviet crime drama by Dinara Asanova
- Boys (1990 film), a Soviet drama by Yuri Grigoryev and Renata Grigoryeva
- The Boys (1991 film), an American television film by Glenn Jordan
- Boys (1996 film), an American film by Stacy Cochran
- Les Boys (lit. The Boys), a 1997 Canadian film by Louis Saia
- The Boys (1998 film), an Australian film by Rowan Woods
- Boys (2003 film), an Indian Tamil film by S. Shankar
- The Boys: The Sherman Brothers' Story, a 2009 American documentary
- Boys (2014 film), or Jongens, a Dutch television film by Mischa Kamp
- Boys (2018 film), or I am Jonas, a French film by Christophe Charrier
- The Boys (2022 film), a South Korean film by Jung Ji-young

=== Television ===
- The Boys (1993 TV series), an American sitcom
- The Boys (franchise), an American media franchise by Amazon Prime Video consisting of several television series adapting the comic book series The Boys (see below)
  - The Boys (TV series), a 2019 live-action adaptation of the comic book series
  - The Boys: Seven on 7, a 2021 live-action promotional web series
  - The Boys Presents: Diabolical, a 2022 animated anthology adaptation of the comic book series

== Literature ==
- "Boys" (short story), an 1887 story by Anton Chekhov
- The Boys, a 1996 book by Martin Gilbert
- The Boys (comics), a 2006–2012 American comic book series by Garth Ennis and Darick Robertson
- The Boys: A Memoir of Hollywood and Family, a 2021 book by Ron Howard and Clint Howard

== Music ==
=== Groups ===
- Boys (Australian band), a 1980s rock band
- The Boys (American band), later Suns of Light, an American R&B quartet
- The Boys (English band), a 1970s–1980s punk rock band
- The Action, originally the Boys, a 1960s English rock band
- Dʼ Boys (pronounced as The Boys), a 1980s Yugoslav band
- The Boys (Finnish band), a Finnish rock'n'roll / R&B band

=== Albums ===
- Boys (Dean Brody album) or the title song (see below), 2020
- Boys (Herzog album) or the title song, 2014
- The Boys (American band the Boys album), 1990
- The Boys (English band The Boys album), 1977
- The Boys (Girls' Generation album) or the title song (see below), 2011
- The Boys (The Necks album) or the title song, 1998
- The Boys (Cleopatrick EP), 2018
- The Boys (The Shadows EP) or the title song, 1962

=== Songs ===
- "Boys" (Britney Spears song), 2002
- "Boys" (Charli XCX song), 2017
- "Boys" (Dean Brody song), 2020
- "Boys" (Lizzo song), 2018
- "Boys" (The Maybes? song), 2008
- "Boys" (The Shirelles song), 1960; covered by the Beatles, 1963
- "Boys" (Sky Ferreira song), 2013
- "Boys (Summertime Love)", by Sabrina, 1987
- "Boys! (What Did the Detective Say?)", by the Sports, 1978
- "Boys", by Adéla from Prima, 2026
- "Boys", by Ashlee Simpson from Bittersweet World, 2008
- "Boys", by Astrid S and Lars Vaular, 2017
- "Boys", by Band Ohne Namen, 2000
- "Boys", by Bauhaus, B-side to the single "Bela Lugosi's Dead", 1979
- "Boys", by Brockhampton from Saturation, 2017
- "Boys", by Gabriella Cilmi from Ten, 2010
- "Boys", by Mary Jane Girls from Mary Jane Girls, 1983
- "Boys", by Mutya Keisha Siobhan, a reformed version of Sugababes, 2013
- "Boys", by Robots in Disguise from Disguises, 2001
- "Boys", by Smile.dk from Smile, 1998
- "Boys", by Sugababes from The Lost Tapes, 2022
- "Boys (Lesson One)", by Jars of Clay from The Long Fall Back to Earth, 2009
- "Les Boys", by Dire Straits from Making Movies, 1980
- "The Boys" (Girls' Generation song), 2011
- "The Boys" (Nicki Minaj and Cassie song), 2012

== Other uses ==
- Boys (surname), a list of people with the name
- Boys anti-tank rifle, a British anti-tank weapon
- The Boys (professional wrestling) or the Tate Twins, an American tag team
- Dallas Cowboys, an NFL team nicknamed "the 'Boys"
- Jesse Evans Gang or The Boys, an outlaw gang of the American Old West
- Boys (Japanese musical), musical series that premiered in 1969

== See also ==
- Boys Boys Boys (disambiguation)
- Boy (disambiguation)
- Bois (disambiguation)
- Boise (disambiguation)
- Boyz (disambiguation)
- The Bhoys (disambiguation)
