= Boy Oh Boy =

Boy Oh Boy may refer to:

- "Boy Oh Boy" (Alexandra Stan song), 2017
- "Boy Oh Boy" (Racey song), 1979
- "Boy Oh Boy" (The Wilkinsons song), 1999
- "Boy Oh Boy" (Diplo and GTA song), 2013

== See also ==
- Boy O'Boy, a 2003 novel
- "Oh boy, oh boy, oh boy!", a 1946 song written by Lasse Dahlquist
- Oh Boy (disambiguation)
- Boyboy (disambiguation)
- Boy (disambiguation)
