= Boys Boys Boys =

Boys Boys Boys or variation may refer to:

- "Boys Boys Boys", a 2008 song by Lady Gaga, from the album The Fame
- "Boys Boys Boys", an alternative title of the 1987 song "Boys (Summertime Love)", by Sabrina Salerno
- "Boys Boys Boys", a 2016 song by Grace, from the album FMA
- Boys, Boys, Boys (1964 album), pop rock album by Lesley Gore

== See also ==
- Boy, Boy, Boy (song), a song by Underworld from the 2007 album Oblivion with Bells
- "Oh boy, oh boy, oh boy!", a 1946 song written by Lasse Dahlquist
- Boyboy (disambiguation)
- Boys (disambiguation)
- Boy (disambiguation)
