= Boy (name) =

Boy is a masculine given name, nickname, and surname. It may refer to:

== People with the given name ==
- Boy Rist (1912–1972), member of the Norwegian Resistance in World War II
- Boy Deul (born 1987), Dutch footballer
- Boy Ecury (1922–1944), member of the Dutch Resistance in World War II
- Boy Gobert (1925–1986), German film and television actor
- Boy Jati Asmara (born 1984), Indonesian footballer
- Boy de Jong (born 1994), Dutch footballer
- Boy Kemper (born 1999), Dutch footballer
- Boy Lornsen (1922–1995), German sculptor and author
- Boy Boy Martin (born 1985), Jamaican-Dutch kickboxer
- Boy Mondragon (born 1958), Filipino singer
- Boy van Poppel (born 1988), Dutch road racing cyclist
- Boy Waterman (born 1984), Dutch footballer
- Boy Westerhof (born 1985), Dutch professional tennis player

== People with the nickname ==
- Boy Abunda (born 1955), Filipino television host and talent manager
- Boy Asistio (1936–2017), Filipino politician
- Roy Brindley (born 1969), English professional poker player nicknamed "The Boy"
- Frederick Browning (1896–1965), British Army lieutenant-general called the "father of the British airborne forces"
- Boy Cabahug (born 1964), Filipino basketball player and coach
- Boy Capel (1881–1919), English polo player, lover and muse of fashion icon Coco Chanel
- Boy Charlton (1907–1975), Australian freestyle swimmer
- Boy George (born 1961), English singer/songwriter
- Boy Hayje (born 1949), Dutch racing driver
- Boy Logro (born 1956), Filipino celebrity chef
- Boy Gé Mendes (born 1952), Senegalese musician
- Boy Mould (1916–1941), British Royal Air Force flying ace
- Tadeusz Boy-Żeleński (1874–1941), Polish writer, poet and translator known by nickname "Boy" or pen-name Boy-Żeleński
- Boy Trip (1921–1990), Dutch politician

== People with the surname ==
- Ida Boy-Ed (1852-1928), German writer
- Karl Boy-Ed (1872-1930), German career naval officer
- Philipp Boy (born 1987), German gymnast
- Pat Boy (born 1949 or 1950), American politician
- Werner Boy (1879–1914), German mathematician

== Fictional characters ==
- Boy (comics), in the comic book The Invisibles
- "Boy", the adopted son of Tarzan in some film adaptations of Tarzan
- Boy, a lion featured in the 1966 film Born Free
- Boy, the main antagonist of the 1989 film Little Monsters
- The Boy, Eustace Boyce, a character in the webcomic Scary Go Round

== See also ==
- Boy (disambiguation)
- Boys (surname)
