= Town to Town (disambiguation) =

Town to Town is a 1981 album by guitarist Phil Keaggy.

Town to Town may also refer to:

- "Town To Town", a track on the 1987 album Crooked Mile by Microdisney
- "Town To Town", a track on the 1994 album G. Love and Special Sauce by G. Love and Special Sauce
- "Town To Town", a track on the 1997 album Future Development by Del the Funky Homosapien
- "Town To Town", a track on the 2006 album Delta Hardware by Charlie Musselwhite
- "Town To Town", a track on the 2010 album Search by Herzog
