= Oboy =

Oboy may refer to:

- Oboý, village in Turkmenistan
- Oboy (rapper) (born 1997), French-Malagasy rapper

== See also ==
- Borgne (Haitian Creole: Obòy), a commune in Haiti
- Oh Boy (disambiguation)
