= Jigs (band) =

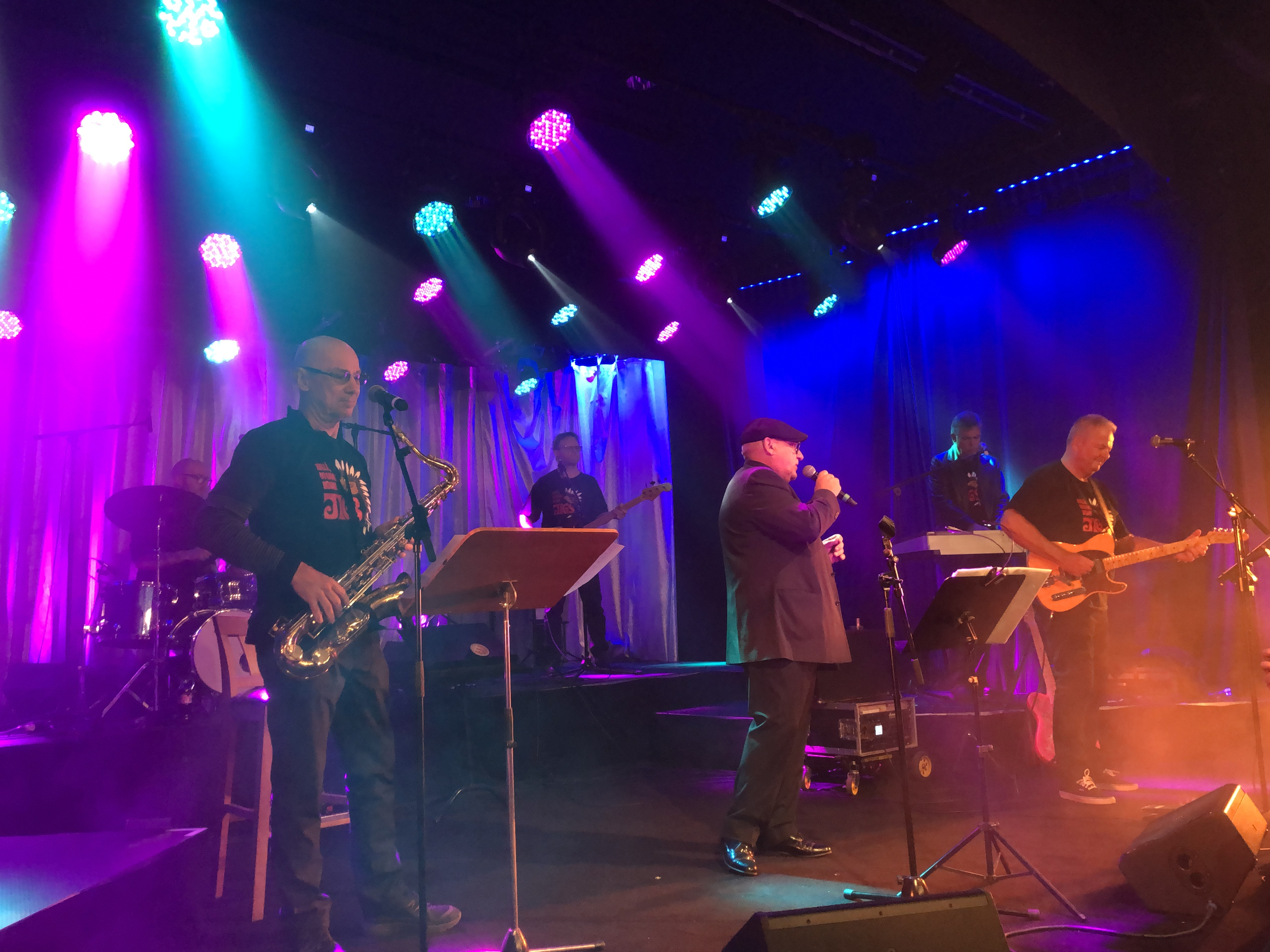
- Jigs playing live in Trollhättan, 2019.

Background information
- Origin: Trollhättan, Sweden
- Genres: Dansband music
- Years active: 1966-1992

Jigs is a dansband, established in 1966 in Trollhättan, Sweden. The band scored several 1970s hits, with recordings of songs like Hallå du gamle indian, Bli min gäst, Dardanella, Let's Twist Again and From a Jack to a King. Their album series was named "Goa bitar". When the band played at Cortina in Vinberg on 16 July 1976, AC/DC appeared as a pause act.

== Discography ==
- Goa bitar 1 (1973)
- Goa bitar 2 (1973)
- Goa bitar 3 (1974)
- Goa bitar 4 (1974)
- Goa bitar 5 (1974)
- 10 i toppar 1 (1975)
- Goa bitar 6 (1976)
- 10 i toppar 2 (1976)
- Goa bitar 7 (1978)
- Greatest hits (1979/1980)
- Shirley (1982)
- Egna drömmar (1983)
- Blå hav (1985)
- Goa bitar 11 (1989)
- Jigs 20 goabitar (1997)
- Jigs samlade goabitar (2003)
