= Boyboy =

Boyboy or Boy-Boy or variant, may refer to:

== Places ==
- Boyboy, Piddig, Ilocos Norte, Philippines; a district of Piddig

== People ==
- Boyboy, a Filipino surname
- Boyboy, a stagename for New Zealand singer-songwriter Sam McCarthy
- Boy-Boy Mosia (1985-2016) a South African soccer player
- Boy Boy Martin (born 1984) a Jamaican-Dutch kickboxer

=== Fictional characters ===
- Boy-Boy (aka Boyboy, Boy Boy), a character from the Singaporean TV show Hero (2016 TV series)
- BoyBoy, a character from the 1973 Toni Morrison novel Sula (novel)
- BoyBoy, a superhero from the animated TV show The Ripping Friends

== Other uses ==
- Boyboy Festival (Burgos, La Union, Philippines); a feeder beauty pageant to Miss La Union
- Boy Boy, a channel on YouTube run by Aleksa Vulović and Alex Apollonov

== See also ==
- Boy (disambiguation)
- Boy, Boy, Boy (song) 2007 song off the album Oblivion with Bells by Underworld
- Boy Oh Boy (disambiguation)
- Boys Boys Boys (disambiguation)
