= Alf Robertson =

Alf Åke Robertson
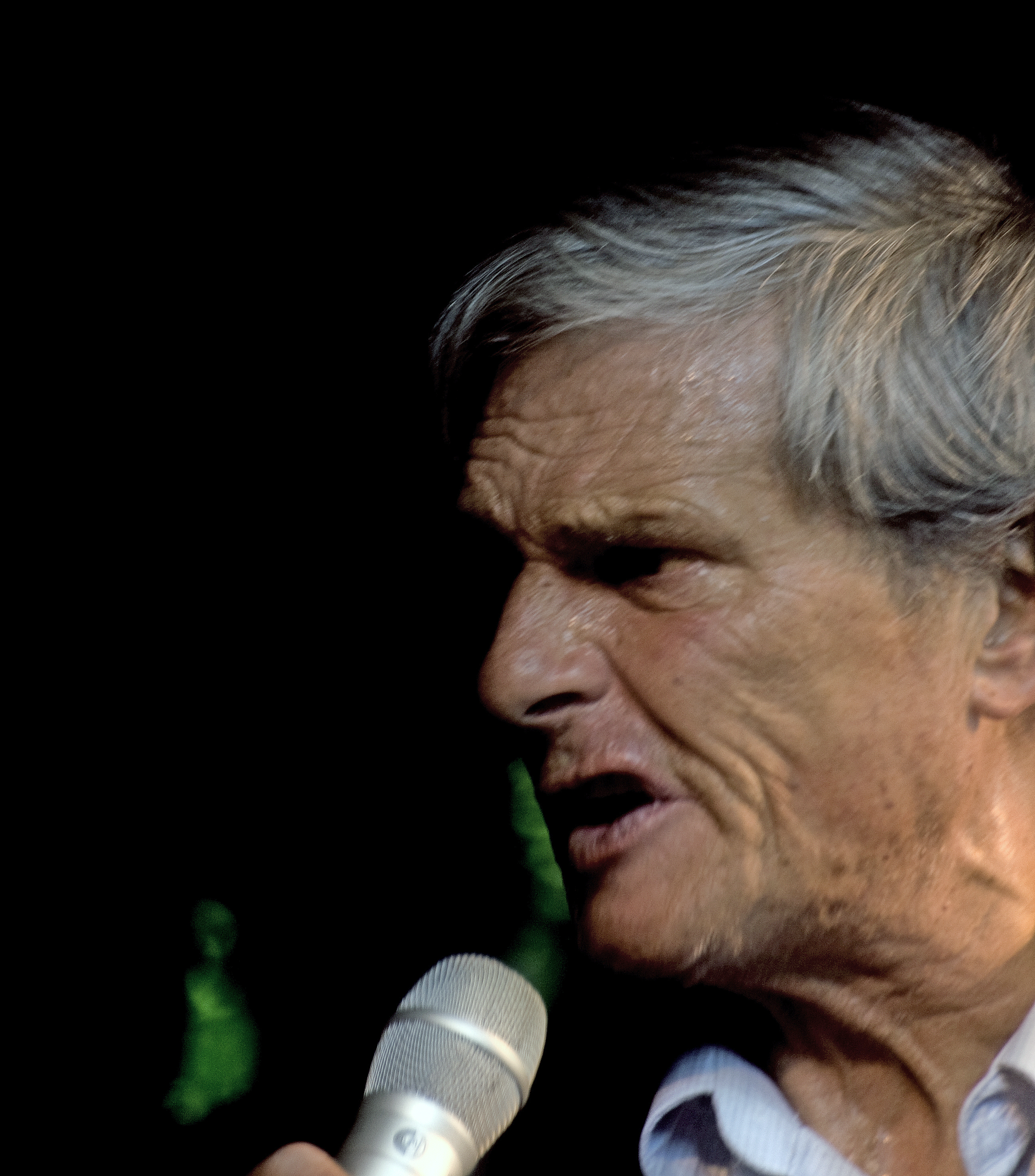

Background information
- Born: 8 June 1941; Gothenburg, Sweden
- Died: 24 December 2008 (aged 67) Kungsbacka, Sweden
- Genres: Country
- Occupation(s): Singer and Composer

Alf Åke Robertson (8 June 1941 – 24 December 2008) was a Swedish country singer and composer who produced 50 albums and about 150 songs during his lifetime, and scoring album successes in Sweden. He died on 24 December 2008 after a spell of serious illness.

== Discography ==
- 1969 - En liten fågel sjöng
- 1970 - Möt Alf Robertson
- 1971 - Fille filur
- 1972 - Närmast till att leva
- 1973 - Sånger mina vänner sjöng
- 1974 - Alf i Nashville
- 1974 - Alf in Nashville (same melody but with English lyrics)
- 1976 - Hundar och ungar och hembrygt äppelvin
- 1977 - Ibland är det som en himmel
- 1977 - Några få minuter
- 1978 - Help the cowboy sing the blues
- 1979 - Nostalgi
- 1981 - Mitt Land
- 1982 - Emilys foto
- 1982 - Symfoni
- 1982 - Till Ada med kärlek (Alf Robertson sings Lasse Dahlquist)
- 1983 - Det kommer från hjärtat
- 1983 - Tellus
- 1984 - Vår värld
- 1985 - Alf Robertson Solsken - best from 1977–1979
- 1986 - Livet är ju som det är
- 1987 - Såna som jag
- 1989 - Tacka vet jag vanligt folk
- 1990 - Liljor
- 1991 - Country classics
- 1992 - I väntan på Dolly
- 1993 - Adios amigo (Alf Robertson sings Gunnar Wiklund)
- 1995 - Hundar och ungar och hembrygt äppelvin (collection-cd)
- 1997 - I full frihet
- 2001 - Guldkorn
- 2001 - Soldaten och kortleken-32 av mina bästa låtar
- 2002 - En liten Femöres kola 1968–86
- 2002 - Rosenkyssar
- 2003 - Alf Robertson Klassiker
- 2007 - Alf Robertsons Bästa
