= Oh Boy =

Oh Boy, Ooh Boy, or variants may refer to:

== Film ==
- Oh, Boy! (1919 film), an American film directed by Albert Capellani that was based upon the 1917 musical
- Oh Boy! (1938 film), a British film of 1938
- Oh Boy! (2012 film), a German film
- Oh Boy! (1991 film), a Dutch film

== Television ==
- Oh Boy! (TV series), a British popular music television series (1958–1959)
- "Oh, boy!", a catchphrase from Quantum Leap, an American television series (1989–1993)

== Music ==
- Oh Boy Records, an American record label
- Oh, Boy! (musical), a 1917 musical

=== Albums ===
- Oh Boy! (album), a 1977 album by Brotherhood of Man
- Oh Boy (Don Cisco album), 2000
- Oh Boy (The Paradise Motel album), 2013

=== Songs ===
- "Oh, Boy!" (The Crickets song), 1957, by Buddy Holly and the Crickets, later covered by Mud
- "Oh Boy" (Cam'ron song), 2002
- "Oh Boy (The Mood I'm In)", a 1975 song by Diana Trask, later covered by Brotherhood of Man
- "Oh Boy", a 2007 song by The Concretes
- "Oh Boy", a 2007 song by Duffy
- "Oh Boy", a 1997 song by UK garage duo The Fabulous Baker Boys
- "Oh Boy", a song by G.E.M. from the album Xposed, 2012
- "Ooh Boy", a song by En Vogue from the album Soul Flower, 2004

== Other uses ==
- Oh boy!, a 2000 French children's novel by Marie-Aude Murail

== See also ==
- "Ooh Boy", a 1977 song by Rose Royce
- "Oh boy, oh boy, oh boy!", a 1946 song written by Lasse Dahlquist
- Boy Oh Boy (disambiguation)
- Boy (disambiguation)
