= Sant Boi =

Sant Boi, Catalan for Saint Baudilus, may refer to:

- Sant Boi Bridge, first steel structure in the high-speed railway joining the city of Madrid and Barcelona
- Sant Boi de Llobregat, town in the comarca of Baix Llobregat
  - Sant Boi (Llobregat–Anoia Line), railway station in the municipality of Sant Boi de Llobregat
  - Sant Boi de Llobregat Museum, museum in Sant Boi de Llobregat
- Sant Boi de Lluçanès, municipality in the comarca of Osona

== See also ==
- Boi (disambiguation)
