= Boyz =

Boyz or The Boyz may refer to:

== Music ==
=== Bands ===
- The Boyz (German band), a German boy band of the 1990s
- The Boyz (American band), an American rock band, established in 1975
- The Boyz (South Korean band), a South Korean boy group formed by IST Entertainment in 2017
- Boy'z, a Hong Kong cantopop duo

=== Songs ===
- "Boyz" (M.I.A. song), 2007
- "Boyz" (Jesy Nelson song), 2021

== Other uses ==
- Boyz, an Indian Marathi-language film series
  - Boyz (film), a 2017 film, the first in the series
- Boyz (magazine), a British weekly LGBT magazine

== See also ==
- Boys (disambiguation)
