= Vinga (Gothenburg) =

Island in the Gothenburg archipelago, Sweden

Coordinates: 57°38′N 11°36′E

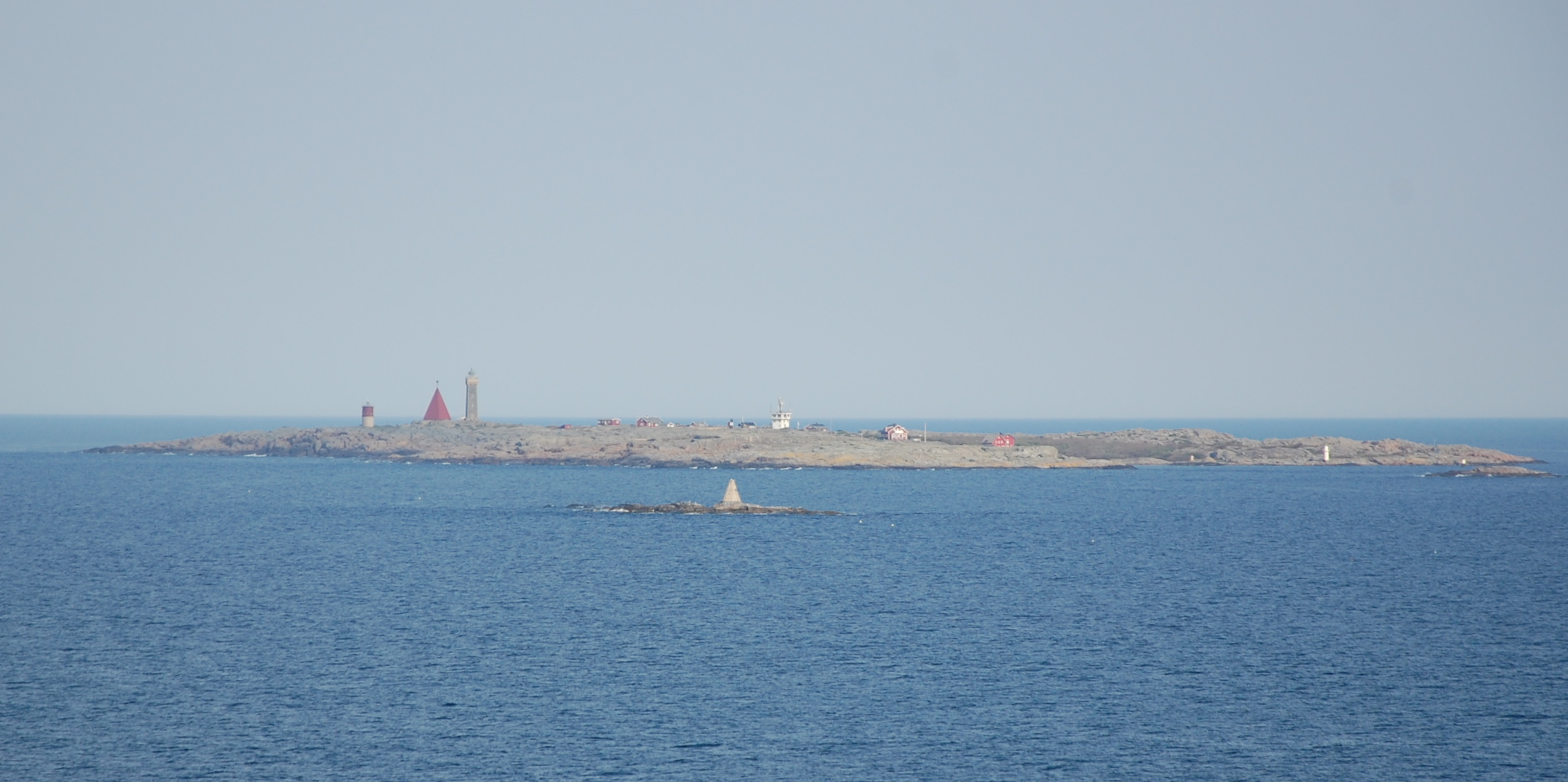
Vinga island in May 2013.

Vinga is a small island 10 nautical miles (19 km; 12 mi) outside Gothenburg's harbour entrance in Sweden. The 19th century Vinga Lighthouse is noted, not only as a beacon in the waterway of the Swedish west coast, but also as the place where the Swedish poet laureate Evert Taube grew up. Today Vinga is a tourist attraction, with boats to and from Gothenburg harbour.

== Geology ==
The bedrock of Vinga is mostly made up of porphyrite (porfyrit), a volcanic rock with less Silicon dioxide, SiO_{2}, than porphyry. The rock has a fine-grained structure, dark with lighter grains of feldspar and other minerals. The mineralogical composition of the Vinga porphyry classifies it as a monzogranite or quartz diorite. The northern part of the island contains orthopyroxene. The Vinga porphyry was created about 950 million years ago, when it penetrated the surrounding older gneiss rock.
