= Cartoon Violence (album) =

Studio album by Herzog
- Released: March 19, 2012
- Genre: Indie rock, power pop
- Label: Exit Stencil Recordings

Herzog chronology
Search (2010)	Cartoon Violence (2012)	Boys (2014)

Cartoon Violence is the second studio album indie rock band Herzog, released on March 19, 2012 on Exit Stencil Recordings. It was recorded more collaboratively than their debut album, Search, with Nick Tolar assisted by Tony Vorell, who wrote the album's lyrics.

== Reception ==
Professional ratings
Review scores
Source	Rating
Glide	(3/10)
I Rock Cleveland	9/10 stars
The Line of Best Fit	
Loud and Quiet	6/10 stars
Robert Christgau	(2-star Honorable Mention)
The Skinny	3/5 stars
Ventura County Star	(moderately positive)

The Skinny gave the album a moderately positive review and described the album's sound as "all Beach Boys-style rolling harmonies and full-blooded power-chord choruses." Another such review came from Loud and Quiet, who wrote, "rather than taking influence from the noughties pop-punk, they at times simply recreate it," and Bill Losey of the Ventura County Star called the album "fun, fun, fun."

== Track listing ==
1. Fuck this Year
2. Rock and Roll Monster
3. You Clean Up Nice
4. Rich People Ballad
5. Dreaming Man II
6. Feedback
7. Your Son is not a Soldier
8. Shakespearean Actress
9. Alexander the Great

== Personnel ==
- Brian Hill (bass)
- Dave McHenry (guitar, vocals)
- Dan Price (drums, vocals)
- Nick Tolar (guitar, vocals)
- Tony Vorell (lyrics, non-playing)
