= 2021 in Nordic music =

The following is a list of notable events and releases that happened in Nordic music in 2021.

== Events ==
=== January ===
- 7 January – The death of Finnish guitarist Alexi Laiho is announced on social media by members of his band Bodom After Midnight. It is reported that Laiho had "suffered from long-term health issues during his last years".
- 12 January – Finnish musician Marko Hietala announces that he is leaving Nightwish and retiring from public life as a result of disillusionment and concerns about his mental health.
- 22 January – Papa Emeritus IV is introduced to the public on the TV game show "På spåret", performing with The Hellacopters.
- 25 January – Swedish musician Snowy Shaw announces that he will release one song per month during 2021, making up a digital album.

=== February ===
- 20 February
  - In the final of Melodi Grand Prix 2021, the 59th edition of Norway's national selection competition for the Eurovision Song Contest, Tix is selected as the country's representative, with the song "Fallen Angel".
  - In the Uuden Musiikin Kilpailu 2021, the 10th edition of Finland's national selection competition for the Eurovision Song Contest, the rock group Blind Channel are selected as the country's representatives, with their song "Dark Side".

=== March ===
- 13 March
  - At Melodifestivalen 2021, the 61st edition of the Swedish music competition, Tusse is selected as Sweden's entrant, with the song "Voices", composed by Joy Deb, Linnea Deb, Jimmy "Joker" Thörnfeldt and Anderz Wrethov. The Mamas, who had been selected as the 2020 entrants, with "Move", also competed in the final, with a new song, "In the Middle", but finished in third place.
  - Iceland's Eurovision representatives, Daði og Gagnamagnið, release "10 Years", the song chosen as the country's entry.

=== May ===
- 30 April – Finnish rock band Before the Dawn release their first single since reforming after their 2013 break-up.

=== May ===
- 19 May – It is announced that two members of Gagnamagnið, Iceland's competitors at the Eurovision Song Contest, have tested positive for COVID-19, meaning that their appearance in the semi-final and final have to be based on footage from their rehearsal at Rotterdam Ahoy, recorded on 13 May.
- 20 May – In the second semi-final of the Eurovision Song Contest 2021, Denmark fail to qualify for the final.
- 22 May – In the final of the Eurovision Song Contest 2021, held in Rotterdam, Netherlands, Iceland finish in 4th place, Finland in 6th place, Sweden in 14th place, and Norway in 18th place.

=== June ===
- 16 June – Copenhell festival was scheduled to begin on this date, with a line-up including Judas Priest, Opeth and The Hu, but was cancelled because of continuing COVID-19 restrictions.
- 22 June – Mia Winter Wallace rejoins Abbath.

=== July ===
- 7 July – Bingsjöstämning, an annual folk festival held near Uppsala, Sweden, takes place online, the live festival having been cancelled because of continuing COVID-19 restrictions.

=== August ===
- 13 August – Mikael Stanne announces that longtime drummer Anders Jivarp and bassist Anders Iwers will be leaving the Swedish metal band Dark Tranquillity.
- 26 August – ABBA launch a new website, containing information about their forthcoming new album.

=== October ===
- October – Tarja Turunen produces her autobiography, Singing in My Blood.

=== November ===
- 5 November - ABBA release Voyage, their first album of new material in 40 years.
- ABBA's new single, is nominated for a Grammy award in the "Record of the Year" category, the group's first-ever nomination.

=== December ===
- 6 December – The Royal Stockholm Philharmonic Orchestra appoints Ryan Bancroft as its next principal conductor, beginning with the 2023–2024 season.
- 6 December – The Helsinki Philharmonic Orchestra announces that Susanna Mälkki will stand down as its chief conductor at the end of the 2022–2023 season, and will become chief conductor emeritus with the orchestra.

== Albums released ==
=== January ===
Day	Album	Artist	Label	Notes	Ref.
8	Welfare Jazz	Viagra Boys	YEAR0001		
15	En gång i tiden	Benjamin Ingrosso	TEN Music	Ingrosso's first album in Swedish language	
22	Leviathan	Therion	Nuclear Blast		
22	Kvitravn	Wardruna	Norse Music	Postponed from April 2020	
22	Never Say Die	Wig Wam	Frontiers Records		
29	Imperial	Soen	Silver Lining Music		
29	Where the Gloom Becomes Sound	Tribulation	Metal Blade (U.S.); Century Media		

=== February ===
Day	Album	Artist	Label	Notes	Ref.
5	The Raging River	Cult of Luna	Red Crk Recordings	EP; guest appearance by Mark Lanegan	
5	Jylhä	Korpiklaani	Nuclear Blast	Digital album, CD, black vinyl and green vinyl	
5	Sturle Dagsland	Sturle Dagsland		Debut album, recorded in Stavanger	
5	Oakland moments: cello, voice, reuniting (rejoicing)	Torben Ulrich & Lori Goldston	via Bandcamp		
12	Riddles, Ruins & Revelations	Sirenia	Napalm Records		
19	Among Ashes and Monoliths	Ablaze My Sorrow	Black Lion Records		
19	Neyslutrans Remixed	Hatari	Svikamylla	Remixes of songs that appeared on Hatari's debut album, Neyslutrans	
26	North Star	Einherjer	Streaming via Bandcamp		
26	Escape of the Phoenix	Evergrey			

=== March ===
Day	Album	Artist	Label	Notes	Ref.
5	Necro Sapiens	Baest			
5	Poster Girl	Zara Larsson	TEN, Epic	#3 on Swedish album chart	
5	The Sognametal Legacy	Windir	Season of Mist	Compilation album, on vinyl	
12	Heart Healer	Heart Healer	Frontiers Records	Magnus Karlsson's project to create the first metal opera using female singers only.	
12	Royal Destroyer	The Crown	Metal Blade Records		
19	Live by Fire II	Enforcer	Nuclear Blast Records	Live album	
19	Ding Dong. You're Dead.	Hedvig Mollestad Trio	Rune Grammofon		
19	Happy Heroes	Trollfest	Napalm Records	EP	
26	Earthrise	The Quill		Ninth full-length album	

=== April ===
Day	Album	Artist	Label	Notes	Ref.
2	Shadows of Iconoclasm	Darkthrone	Peaceville Records	Box set	
9	Norwegian Gothic	Årabrot	Pelagic	Produced by Jaime Gomez Arellano	
9	Vultures Die Alone	Arion		Produced by Matias Kupiainen	
16	Have Courage Dear Heart	Liv Kristine	Nuclear Blast	9-track EP; digital version only released on this date	
23	Paint the Sky with Blood	Bodom After Midnight	Napalm Records	EP; featuring final work of Alexi Laiho	
30	Out of the Ashes Into the Fire	Axewitch	Pure Steel Records	First album since 1985	
30	Ups!de Down	Electric Boys	Mighty Music	Recorded at Ghost Ward studios; co-produced with David Castillo	
30	Wild North West	Vreid	Season of Mist		

=== May ===
Day	Album	Artist	Label	Notes	Ref.
1	Green Valley Live	Candlemass	Peaceville	Live album, including one new track	
7	Virgo	Sarah Klang	Pangur Records		
7	Seek Shelter	Iceage	Mexican Summer	First album featuring Casper Morilla Fernandez. Two tracks feature the Lisboa Gospel Collective.	
21	Welcome	Daði Freyr	AWAL	EP	
21	Witness	VOLA	Mascot Records	The band's first top ten album on the UK Rock Albums chart	
28	Creatures of the Dark Realm	Bloodbound	AFM Records	9th studio album	
28	Svartrviðr	King of Asgard		Mixed and mastered by Magnus Devo Andersson at Endarker Studio (Sweden)	

=== June ===
Day	Album	Artist	Label	Notes	Ref.
11	Lay Down and Be Counted	General Surgery		EP	
11	Needles of Rust	This Ending	Black Lion Records	Recorded, mixed and mastered at Wing Studios by Sverker Widgren	
18	The Enigma Birth	Timo Tolkki's Avalon	Frontiers Music Srl	featuring Raphael Mendes	
25	Eternal Hails	Darkthrone			
25	Opus Ferox – The Great Escape	Loch Vostok			
25	Fun Is Not a Straight Line	Sasu Ripatti	Planet Mu		

=== July ===
Day	Album	Artist	Label	Notes	Ref.
2	The Nightmare of Being	At the Gates	Century	Mixed and mastered by Jens Bogren	
9	Temporary Highs in the Violet Skies	Snoh Aalegra	ARTium, Roc Nation		
9	Atavistic Black Disorder / Kommando	Mayhem	Century	EP	
23	Parabellum	Yngwie Malmsteen	Music Theories Recordings/Mascot Label Group		
30	Sprinkles	Kasper Bjørke		Instrumental	
30	Arete	Netherbird	Eisenwald		
30	20 Years of Gloom, Beauty and Despair – Live in Helsinki	Swallow the Sun	Century Media Records	Live album	

=== August ===
Day	Album	Artist	Label	Notes	Ref.
13	Negative	Act of Denial	Crusader Records/Golden Robot Records	Debut album	
20	Hexahedron – Live at Henie Onstad Kunstsenter	Ulver		Live album recorded in April 2018	
27	Aphelion	Leprous	InsideOut Music	Recorded at studios in Sweden and Norway	
27	The Tritonus Bell	Hooded Menace		Mixed by Andy LaRocque	
27	Vanagandr	Thyrfing	Despotz Records	Co-recorded and co-produced by Jakob Herrmann at Top Floor Studios, Gothenburg; mixed by Jacob Hansen	

=== September ===
Day	Album	Artist	Label	Notes	Ref.
10	Back on Track	M.ill.ion	AOR Heaven	Mixed by Simon Hanhart and mastered by Tim Debney	
10	Strong	Anette Olzon	Frontiers Music Srl	Written and composed in collaboration with Magnus Karlsson	
17	Argent Moon	Insomnium	Century Media Records	EP	
24	Companion	Skepticism	Svart Records	First album since 2015	
24	Shaman (EP)	Orbit Culture	Seek & Strike	Produced, mixed and mastered by Niklas Karlsson	

=== October ===
Day	Album	Artist	Label	Notes	Ref.
1	Mnemosynean	Katatonia	Peaceville Records	Compilation album	
8	Imperial Congregation	Blood Red Throne	Nuclear Blast		
8	Wired	Eclipse			
15	God Ends Here	Aeon	Metal Blade Records		
15	Måsstaden under vatten	Vildhjarta	Century Media	First album with Buster Odeholm as drummer	
22	Arsonist of the Soul	Burning Point	AFM Records	First album for five years	
29	The Sixth Storm	Count Raven	I Hate Records	First album for 12 years	
29	WoduridaR	Helheim	Dark Essence	Recorded at Conclave & Earshot Studio	

=== November ===
Day	Album	Artist	Label	Notes	Ref.
5	Voyage	ABBA	Polar Music/Universal Music	Produced by Benny Andersson	
5	Origin	Omnium Gatherum	Century Media Records	Mixed by Jens Bogren and mastered by Tony Lindgren at Fascination Street Studios	
5	Allsighr	Sarke	Soulseller Records	Recorded by Børge Finstad and Kevin Kleiven at Top Room Studios	
12	Angel of Carnage Unleashed	Darkwoods My Betrothed	Napalm Records	Featuring Tuomas Holopainen	
12	Won't Let the Sun Go Down	The Mamas	Universal Music	EP	
19	Moonflowers	Swallow the Sun		Bonus instrumental album composed for strings and recorded at Sipoo Church in Finland	
26	Worship the Eternal Darkness	Archgoat	Debemur Morti Productions		
26	Heaven in Hiding	Imminence	We Are Triumphant Records		
26	The Bleeding Veil	In Mourning	Agonia Records		
26	Lordiversity	Lordi		Box set of seven albums	

=== December ===
Day	Album	Artist	Label	Notes	Ref.
3	Victory in Blood	Unanimated		First studio album for 10 years	
3	Servant of the Mind	Volbeat	Republic Records	Featuring Stine Bramsen	
10	Praesentialis in Aeternum	Funeral		mixed and mastered by Børge Finstad	
10	A Gentleman's Legacy	The Murder of My Sweet		Featuring Mike Palace and Patrick Janson	
17	1349	Memory Garden	No Remorse Records	First full-length album for 8 years	

== Eurovision Song Contest ==
- Denmark in the Eurovision Song Contest 2021
- Finland in the Eurovision Song Contest 2021
- Iceland in the Eurovision Song Contest 2021
- Norway in the Eurovision Song Contest 2021
- Sweden in the Eurovision Song Contest 2021

== Classical works ==
- Anna S. Þorvaldsdóttir – Catamorphosis
- Klas Torstensson – City Imprints

== Opera ==
- Kaija Saariaho and Sofi Oksanen – Innocence

== Film and television music ==
- Matti Bye – Young Royals
- Gaute Storaas – Three Wishes for Cinderella (Tre nøtter til Askepott), starring Astrid S

== Deaths ==
- 10 January – Thorleif Torstensson, 71, Swedish singer (COVID-19)
- 16 January – Pave Maijanen, 70, Finnish musician (complications from amyotrophic lateral sclerosis)
- 13 February – Eva Nässén, 74, Swedish singer and teacher
- 1 March – Hauk Buen, 87, Norwegian hardingfele fiddler and fiddle maker
- 7 March – Lars-Göran Petrov, 49, Swedish singer (cancer)
- 11 March – Claes Dieden, 78, Swedish singer-songwriter
- 4 May – Henrik Ohlin, Swedish bassist (Black Ingvars). (death announced on this date)
- 10 May
  - Lars-Gunnar Bodin, 85, Swedish electronic music pioneer
  - Svante Thuresson, 84, Swedish jazz musician
- 25 May – Søren Holm, 25, Danish singer (Liss).
- 2 June – Carl Høgset, 79, Norwegian choral conductor and singer
- 9 June – Torgny Björk, 82, Swedish musician, composer and singer.
- 27 June – Peps Persson, 74, Swedish blues and reggae musician and social critic
- 20 July – Curt-Eric Holmquist, 73, conductor and Eurovision Song Contest winner
- 4 August – Anders Pettersson, 69, Swedish musician (Lasse Stefanz)
- 16 September – Geir Johnson, 67, Norwegian composer and musicologist
- 19 September – Mats Paulson, 83, Swedish singer, poet and songwriter
- 30 September – Lennart Åberg, 79, Swedish jazz musician and composer
- 9 October – Jim Pembroke, 75, British-born vocalist of Finnish band Wigwam
- 21 October – Einár, 19, Swedish rapper (shot)
- 27 October – Benjamin Vallé, 47, Swedish musician (Viagra Boys).
- 11 November – Per Aage Brandt, 77, Danish writer, poet, linguist and musician
- 19 November – Hank von Hell, 49, Norwegian punk rock singer
- 27 November – Teppo Hauta-aho, Finnish double bassist and composer (born 1941)
- 28 November – Laila Halme, 87, Finnish singer
- 17 December – Torhild Staahlen, 74, Norwegian operatic mezzo-soprano
