= Marcus Malte =

French author (born 1967)

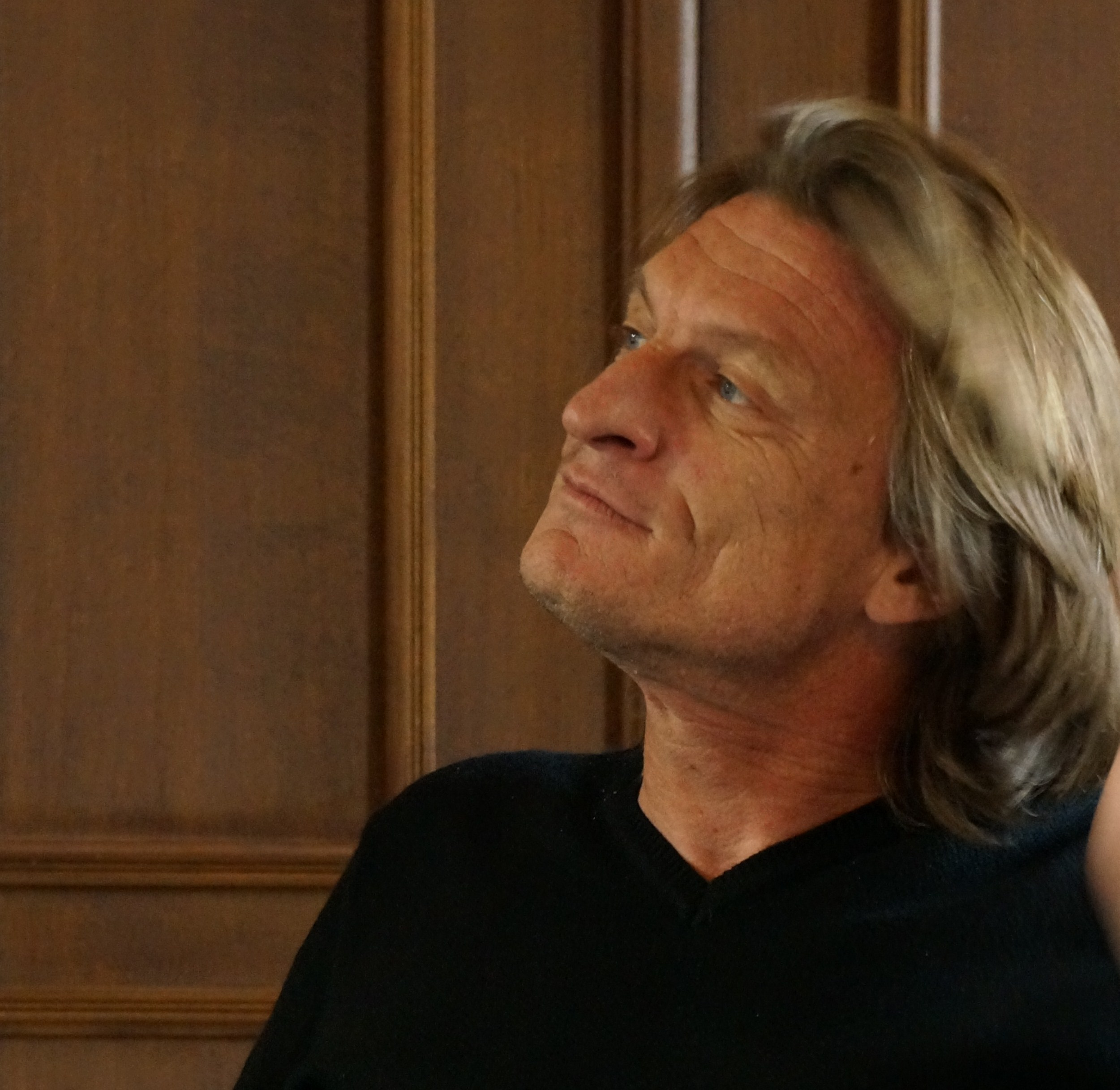
- Marcus Malte in 2013
- Born: 30 December 1967 (age 58); La Seyne-sur-Mer, Var, France
- Occupation: Author

Marcus Malte (born 30 December 1967) is a French author. He received the Prix Femina for Le Garçon in 2016. This book was later translated to English by Emma Ramadan and Tom Roberge, then published as The Boy.
