= The Bhoys (disambiguation) =

The Bhoys is a nickname for Celtic F.C., an association football club based in Glasgow, Scotland.

The Bhoys may also refer to:

- The Bhoys from Seville, term used for Celtic F.C. and fans during the 2002–03 UEFA Cup
- Charlie and the Bhoys, an Irish folk band based in Scotland
- Lansdowne Yonkers FC, an association football club based in Yonkers, New York, nicknamed The Bhoys
- "One of the Bhoys", a song by Mark Sheridan

== See also ==
- Boy (disambiguation)
- Boys (disambiguation)
