= Vinga Lighthouse =

Lighthouse in Sweden

Vinga Lighthouse Vinga fyr
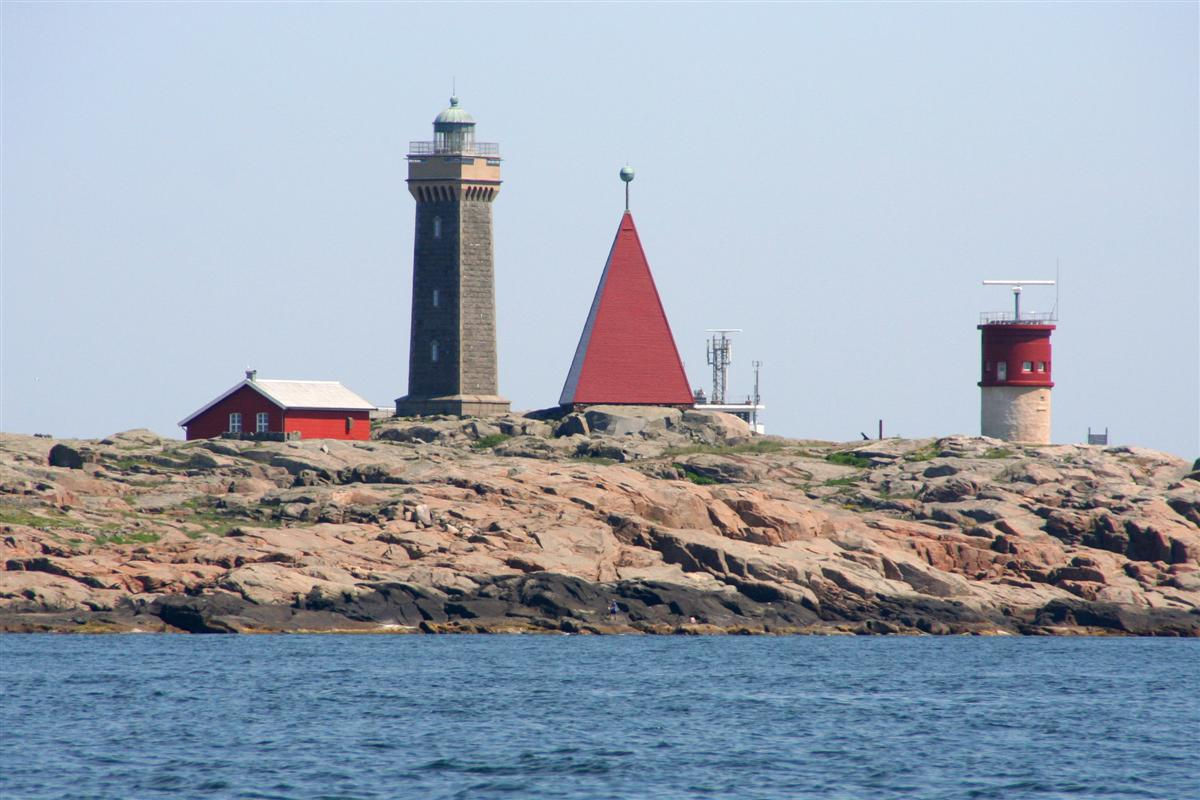
- Vinga Lighthouse
- Location: Vinga island Gothenburg Archipelago; Sweden
- Coordinates: 57°37′55″N 11°36′05″E

Tower
- Constructed: 1841 (first); 1854 (second)
- Foundation: porphyry
- Construction: porphyry tower
- Automated: 1974
- Height: 29 m (95 ft)
- Shape: square tower with balcony and lantern
- Markings: unpainted tower, grey metallic lantern dome
- Power source: kerosene, electricity
- Operator: Swedish Maritime Administration (Sjöfartsverket)
- Heritage: governmental listed building

Light
- First lit: 1890 (current)
- Focal height: 46 m (151 ft)
- Lens: 1st order Fresnel lens
- Range: 25 nautical miles (46 km; 29 mi)
- Characteristic: Fl (2) W 30s.
- Sweden no.: SV-7547

Vinga Lighthouse (Swedish: Vinga fyr), is a Swedish lighthouse on Vinga island. The present-day lighthouse was built in 1890, although Vinga has been a significant island for mariners long before that. This lighthouse is the third built on the island. It is one of Sweden's most noted lighthouses and a special symbol for the city of Gothenburg.

== History ==
The first tower was built in 1841, it was the first Swedish lighthouse with lens. A second was built in 1854 to make Vinga a "double light", since there had been complaints that it was hard to tell the difference between the lighthouse in Skagen, Denmark, and Vinga, Sweden, from afar. The flame ran on colza oil. In the 1880s the need for a better and higher lighthouse was urgent and in 1890 the new lighthouse was built, it ran on paraffin. The lantern on the second lighthouse was removed and it was transformed into a watchtower (the red and gray short tower on the picture). The first lighthouse was demolished and only the foundation remains.

In 1948, the tower was electrified and in 1974, it was automated. It is now remote controlled by the Swedish Maritime Administration, who wanted to deactivate the lighthouse in 2007 since the commercial shipping did not need it anymore. The proposition met with heavy opposition and as of 2015 the tower is still active.

The Vinga station also has a distinctive red pyramid, a day beacon, adjacent to the tower. It was built in 1857.

== Cultural significance ==
Today, Vinga lighthouse is a popular tourist attraction, and during summer there are often guided tours on the island. The Swedish poet and musician Evert Taube was the son of one of the light keepers. Being born the same year (1890) the third lighthouse was built, he spent his childhood there. The light shining from Vinga lighthouse is also mentioned in the song Dans på Brännö brygga.

== See also ==
- List of lighthouses and lightvessels in Sweden
