= Boy (disambiguation) =

A boy is a young male human.

Boy or The Boy may also refer to:

== People ==
- Boy (name), a list of people with the given name, surname, nickname or stage name

== Arts and entertainment ==
=== Fictional characters ===
- Boy (comics), in the comic book The Invisibles
- "Boy", the adopted son of Tarzan in some film adaptations of Tarzan
- Boy, a lion featured in the 1966 film Born Free
- Boy, the main antagonist of the 1989 film Little Monsters
- The Boy, Eustace Boyce, a character in the webcomic Scary Go Round

=== Films ===
- Boy (1969 film) (Shōnen), a Japanese film
- Boys (2003 film), a Tamil film directed by S. Shankar
- Boy (2009 film), a Filipino film directed by Auraeus Solito
- Boy (2010 film), a New Zealand film directed by Taika Waititi
- The Boy (2015 film), an American psychological horror film directed by Craig Macneill
- The Boy (2016 film), an American horror film directed by William Brent Bell
- Boy (2025 film), a South Korean romantic crime drama film directed by Lee Sang-deok
- B.O.Y.: Bruises of Yesterday, 2024 Danish film

=== Books ===
- Boy (autobiography), a 1984 autobiography by Roald Dahl
- Boy (novel), a 1931 novel by James Hanley
- Boy, a 1900 novel by Marie Corelli
- Boy, a Spanish language novel by Luis Coloma
- The Beautiful Boy, published in the UK as The Boy, a 2003 book by Germaine Greer
- The Boy (Malte novel), a 2016 French novel by Marcus Malte, translated in 2019 by Emma Ramadan and Tom Roberge

=== Music ===
==== Artists ====
- Boy (American band), an American rock group that included Freddy Moore of The Nu Kats
- Boy (Canadian band), a Canadian indie pop group
- Boy (duo), a Swiss-German pop duo founded 2007
- B.O.Y, a South Korean pop duo founded 2019
- The Boy, a nickname for Drake (musician), a Canadian rapper

==== Albums ====
- Boy (2hollis album), 2024
- Boy (Lena Philipsson album), 1987
- Boy (U2 album), 1980
- Boy (EP), by Luke Hemmings, 2024
- Boy, an EP by Kevin McHale, 2019
- The Boy, an EP by Mark Knopfler, 2024
- B.O.Y., an EP by Kylie Cantrall, 2025

==== Songs ====
- "Boy" (Book of Love song), 1985
- "Boy" (Marcella Detroit song), 1996
- "Boy (I Need You)", by Mariah Carey, 2002
- "Boy" (Erasure song), 2006
- "Boy" (Shion Miyawaki song), 2007
- "Boy" (Emma Louise song), 2012
- "Boy" (Lee Brice song), 2017
- "Boy" (Treasure song), 2020
- "Boy" (The Killers song), 2022
- "Boy", by Apink from Une Année, 2012
- "Boy", by Chaz Jankel from Chasanova, 1981
- "Boy", by EXID from Eclipse, 2017
- "Boy", by Hellyeah from Welcome Home, 2019
- "Boy", by Kylie Minogue, a B-side of "Can't Get You Out of My Head", 2001
- "Boy", by Little Mix from Salute, 2013
- "Boy", by Maisie Peters from You Signed Up for This, 2021
- "Boy", by Odesza from A Moment Apart, 2017
- "Boy", by Ra Ra Riot from The Orchard, 2010
- "Boy", by Timmy Cruz, 1980s
- "Boy (Go)", by the Golden Palominos from Visions of Excess, 1985
- "Boy (I'm So in Love with You)", by Robin Zander from Robin Zander, 1993
- "BOY", by Charlie Puth from Voicenotes, 2018
- "B.O.Y.", by Jessica Simpson from A Public Affair, 2006
- "The Boy", by Alabama from Roll On, 1984
- "The Boy", by Casey Veggies, 2014
- "The Boy", by Samantha Mumba from Gotta Tell You, 2000
- "The Boy", by the Smashing Pumpkins from The Aeroplane Flies High, 2013
- "The Best One Yet (The Boy)", by Black Eyed Peas from The Beginning, 2010

=== Other arts and entertainment ===
- Boy (play), a 2016 play by Leo Butler
- The Boy (fountain), an 1863 sculpture and drinking fountain in London
- The Boy (Modigliani), a 1919 painting by Amedeo Modigliani
- The Boy (musical), a 1917 London hit musical comedy
- The Boy (TV series), a Canadian animated television series

== Other uses ==
- Bobo Dioulasso Airport, Burkina Faso, by IATA code
- Boy seaman, a rating in the British Royal Navy and enlisted rank in the United States Navy
- Boy (dog), a 17th-century hunting poodle owned by Prince Rupert of the Rhine
- Boy, a part of the borough of Bottrop-Süd in Bottrop, North Rhine-Westphalia, Germany
- Son

== See also ==
- Little Boy, the name of the type of atomic bomb used in the bombing of Hiroshima
- Boi (disambiguation)
- Bouy (disambiguation)
- "Boy, Boy, Boy", a 2007 song by Underworld off the album Oblivion with Bells
- Boyboy (disambiguation)
- Boye (disambiguation)
- Boys (disambiguation)
- Buoy (disambiguation)
- Oh Boy (disambiguation)
- The Bhoys (disambiguation)
- "This Boy", a 1963 song by the Beatles
