= Herzog (band) =

American indie rock band

- Origin: Cleveland, OH
- Genres: Power pop, Indie rock
- Years active: 2010–present
- Labels: Exit Stencil Recordings
- Members: Nick Tolar (guitar, vocals) Dave McHenry (guitar, vocals) Charlie Trenta (bass) Dan Price (drums, vocals) Tony Vorell (lyrics)
- Past members: TJ Duke (bass) Brian Hill (bass)

Herzog is an indie rock band from Cleveland, Ohio formed in 2010. Their music has been described as "subtlety-free rock," and has been compared to Cloud Nothings, whose bassist, TJ Duke, formerly played in Herzog. The band's frontman, Nick Tolar, graduated from Saint Ignatius High School in 2000. They became well known when NPR chose the song "Silence" from their debut album Search as a song of the year in 2011. Their third album, Boys, was released on May 20, 2014. Dan Price, the band's drummer, has said that its music resembles Weezer and the other '90's bands he and his bandmates grew up listening to. He has also said that Boys is the best representation of his band's sound yet.

== Discography ==
=== Albums ===
- Search (2010) - Transparent Records, later re-released on Exit Stencil on February 8, 2011
- Cartoon Violence (2012) - Exit Stencil Recordings
- Boys (2014) - Exit Stencil Recordings
- Me Vs. You (2019) - Exit Stencil Recordings
- Fiction Writer (2021) - Exit Stencil Recordings
- A Hotel in Your Hometown (2022) - Exit Stencil Rexordings

=== Singles ===
- Georgia / Paul Blart and the Death of Art (split single with Yuck, only 300 copies were made) (2010) - Transparent Records
- Mad Men (2014) - Exit Stencil Recordings
- Slow Days / Arizona (split single with Chomp) (2014) - Exit Stencil Recordings
- Little Bugs (2019) - Exit Stencil Recordings
