= Grand Bois =

Grand Bois may refer to:

- Grand Bois, Mauritius, a village in the district of Savanne, Mauritius (see List of places in Mauritius)
- Grand Bois (loa), an elemental, nature-oriented loa (Voodoo spirit)
- Grand Bois National Park, a national park in Haiti
- Col de Grand Bois, a mountain pass in the Rhône-Alpes region, France

== See also ==
- Grand-Blois, a village in Haiti
- Petit Bois (disambiguation)
