= Bôi River =

River in Vietnam

Coordinates: 20°20′50″N 105°48′29″E

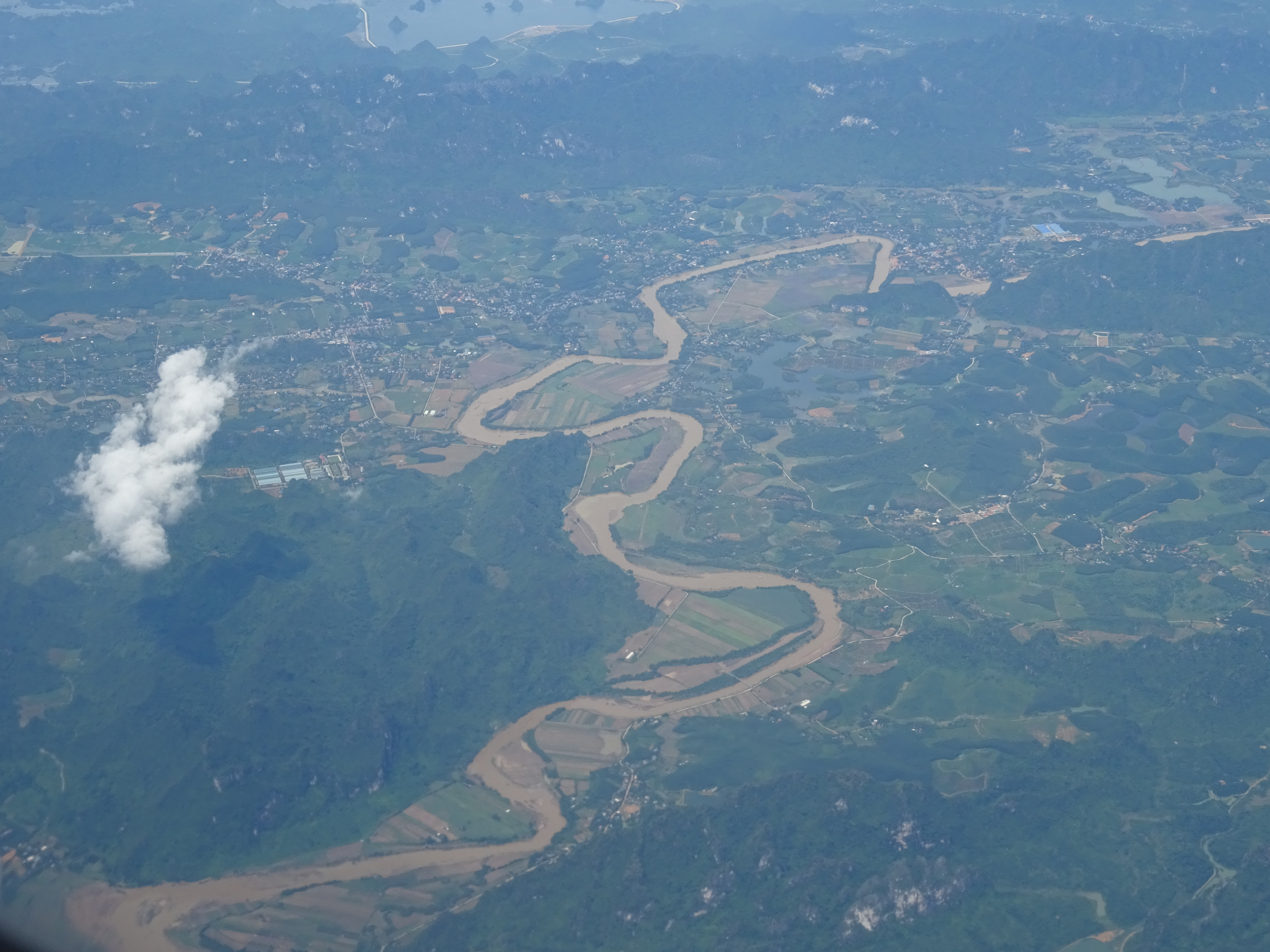
The Bôi River in the Hòa Bình Province.

The Bôi River (Vietnamese: Sông Bôi) is a river of Vietnam. It flows through Hòa Bình Province and Ninh Bình Province for 125 kilometres. The river has a basin area of 1550 km^{2}.
