= Stevie Boi =

American fashion designer

- Label: SB Shades

Stevie Boi is an American fashion designer and founder of the luxury eyewear line SB Shades. He currently resides in Baltimore.

== Career ==
Stevie Boi was born in Augusta, Georgia. He was raised mainly outside the United States. He reported in an interview that he grew up with parents who were in the Army and traveled a lot during his childhood. He started designing in 2007 and quit his job with the military to start his business selling eyewear. Boi's big break was landing his eyewear on the cover of Vogue Italia November issue shot by Steven Meisel's, plus an additional six-page spread entitled "The A Train", featuring pieces from his collection "Coexist". Time magazine conducted an interview with Boi. The interview brought great press coverage for Boi and his brand. He was voted number 1 on Time magazines "9 Dream Jobs That Actually Pay" list.
