= Boy Mould =

Royal Air Force fighter pilot

Peter Mould
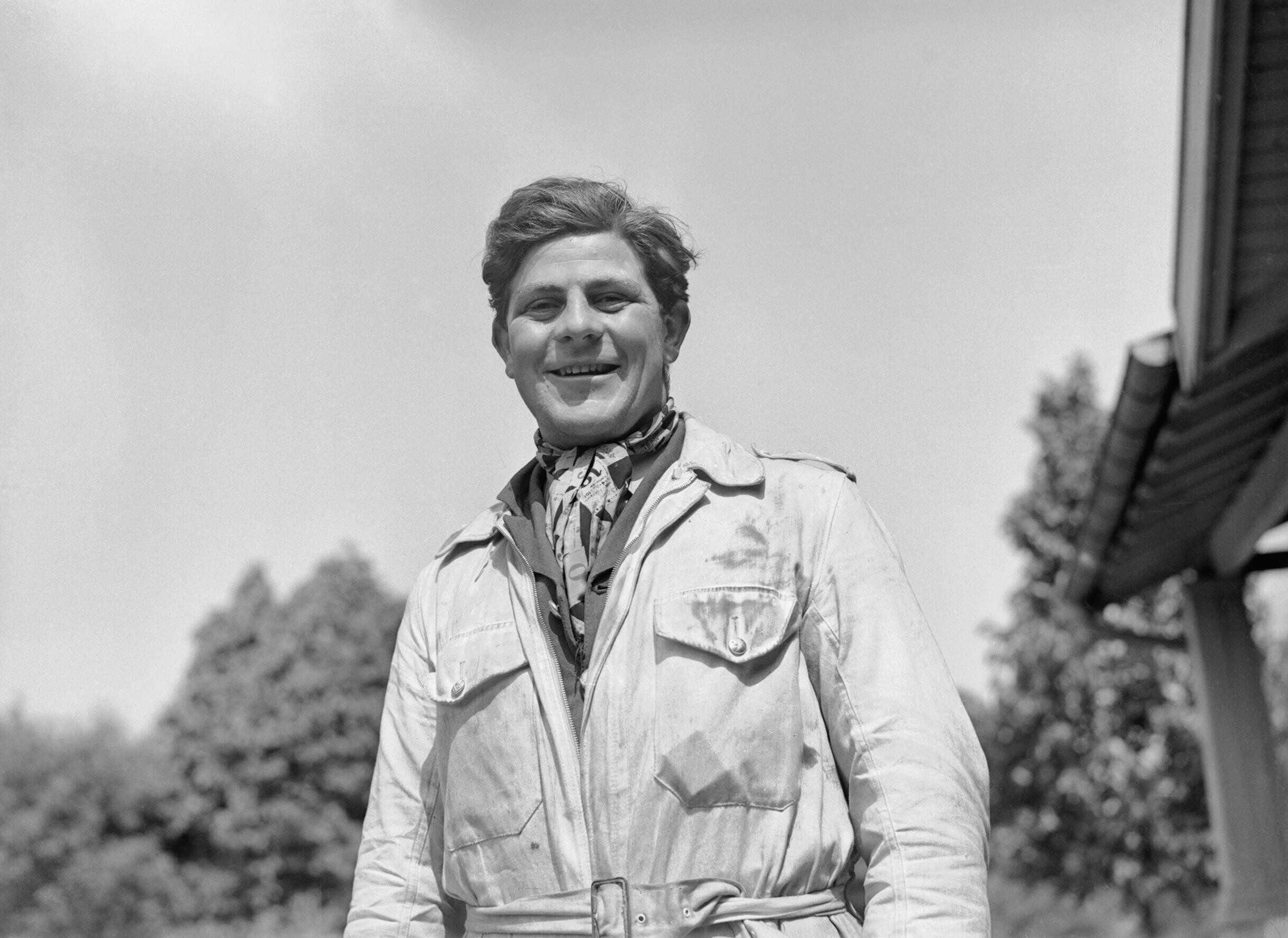
- Pilot Officer Mould of No. 1 Squadron RAF just after returning to Berry-au-Bac, having shot down two German aircraft east of Vouziers.
- Born: 14 December 1916?
- Died: 1 October 1941 (aged 24); Malta
- Military career
- Allegiance: United Kingdom
- Branch: Royal Air Force
- Rank: Squadron Leader
- Nickname: Boy
- Service number: 33414
- Commands: No. 185 Squadron RAF (1941)
- Conflicts: Second World War: French and Low Countries campaign; Battle of France; Mediterranean and Middle East theatre; Siege of Malta †
- Awards: Distinguished Flying Cross & Bar

Peter William Olber "Boy" Mould, DFC & Bar (14 December 1916? – 1 October 1941) was a Royal Air Force fighter pilot and flying ace of the Second World War.

== Early life ==
The first son and third child of Charles and Ethel Mould, he grew up on the family estate at Great Easton, Leicestershire, and later at the Rectory at Stoke Dry in Rutland.

== RAF career ==
Mould "joined the Royal Naval training ship HMS Conway, but changed to the Air Force when he joined Halton Apprentice School." In 1937, Mould was one of four Halton students in his intake of 180 selected to transfer to RAF College, Cranwell, to train to become pilot officers. There, he excelled at athletics.

After graduating in 1939, Pilot Officer Mould was assigned to No. 1 Squadron RAF at Tangmere. On the outbreak of the Second World War in September 1939, the squadron was deployed to France as part of the RAF Advanced Air Striking Force. On 30 October, he achieved the RAF's first victory of the war, downing a Dornier Do 17P photo-reconnaissance aircraft west of Toul. He would go on to claim six more aircraft in the skies over France, making him an ace. He was subsequently awarded the Distinguished Flying Cross (DFC) on 16 July 1940.

The squadron was withdrawn from France on 18 June. Though it fought in the Battle of Britain, Mould did not. He was posted to No. 5 Operational Training Unit as an instructor.

Flight Lieutenant Mould was sent to Malta, helping to deliver Hurricane IIa fighters to the island from HMS Ark Royal on 3 April 1941. There, he led a flight of No. 261 Squadron RAF until 12 May. When No. 185 Squadron RAF was formed, he was given command as a squadron leader. He shot down an Italian Macchi C.200 on 11 July and, in "recognition of gallantry displayed in flying operations against the enemy" on Malta, was awarded a Bar to his DFC. The award was gazetted on 9 September 1941, reading:

This officer has led the squadron on 62 daylight sorties since May 1941; in addition, he has carried out 7 night sorties. Under his leadership the unit has destroyed eight, probably destroyed fourteen and damaged seven hostile aircraft; Squadron Leader Mould has destroyed one and damaged two. By his magnificent example and courage, Squadron Leader Mould has contributed to the high standard of operational efficiency and morale of the squadron.

On 1 October 1941, he led eight Hurricanes to intercept an Italian raid 30 miles (48 km) north-east of the island. While chasing one group of enemy aircraft, he was ambushed by another group which included Macchi C.202 fighters, the first of their type to appear over Malta. None of his comrades witnessed him being shot down. According to the squadron diary:

The CO was leading A Flight in a scramble after a +2. These he spotted and proceeded to give chase. As they were above him, he was compelled to lose speed to gain height. A further plot of +9 then appeared which he apparently did not hear about owing to R/T failure, and just when he was unfavourably placed – he had followed the +2 out of the sun – the formation was jumped by about a dozen Macchis and CR42's. ... The situation was hopeless and our pilots broke off the engagement and returned to base – with one exception, the CO.

— Pilot Officer Peter Thompson

While on leave in January 1940, he had married Phyllis Hawkings in Leicestershire. His name is one of those inscribed on the Malta Memorial.

== Victories ==
Mould's final tally was eight aircraft destroyed, along with two shared destroyed. He flew the Hawker Hurricane I until he was posted to Malta, at which point he piloted the Hurricane IIa.

Date	Aircraft	Location	Notes
30 October 1939	Dornier Do 17	West of Toul	
1 April 1940	Messerschmitt Bf 110	Near Longuyon	
20 April	Heinkel He 112	West of Saarlautern	Unconfirmed
10 May	Heinkel He 111	Vassincourt – Berry-au-Bac	
11 May	Messerschmitt Bf 110	West of Chémery	1/3 shared credit
13 May	Heinkel He 111; Messerschmitt Bf 110	East of Vouziers	
14 May	Messerschmitt Bf 110		
15 May	Messerschmitt Bf 110		
9 July 1941	Six "flying boats"	On the water at Syracuse, Sicily	1/4 shared credit
11 July	Macchi C.200	Malta	
