= B.O.Y.: Bruises of Yesterday =

2024 Danish drama film

- Theatrical film poster
- Danish: Glasskår
- Directed by: Søren Green
- Written by: Søren Green; Tomas Lagermand Lundme
- Produced by: Pelle Folmer; Morten Holst; Per Holst
- Starring: Noa Risbro Hjerrild; Alexander Mayah Larsen; Bodil Jørgensen; Jens Jørn Spottag
- Cinematography: Stephanie Stål Axelgård
- Edited by: Elin Pröjts
- Music by: Buster Jensen; Jonas Holst Schmidt
- Release dates: 21 September 2024 (Buster Film Festival); 16 April 2025 (Denmark)
- Running time: 92 mins.
- Country: Denmark
- Language: Danish

B.O.Y.: Bruises of Yesterday (Danish: Glasskår) is a 2024 Danish coming-of-age drama film, directed by Søren Green, who co-wrote with Tomas Lagermand Lundme. The film stars Noa Risbro Hjerrild, Bodil Jørgensen, Jens Jørn Spottag, and Alexander Mayah Larsen. It premiered at the Buster Film Festival in 2024, before its limited theatrical release throughout Denmark the following year.

== Synopsis ==
A 16-year-old boy, who spends the summer with his grandparents, falls in love with an older young man. But when tragedy strikes, he falls into a dark hole of self-harm, lust, and loneliness.

== Cast ==
- Noa Risbro Hjerrild as Tobias
- Alexander Mayah Larsen as Aron
- Bodil Jørgensen as Grandmother
- Jens Jørn Spottag as Grandfather
- Jonathan Bergholdt Jørgensen as Jonas
- Christopher Læssø as Elias
- Iben Dorner as Mother
- Paw Henriksen as Father

== Reception ==
Vittoria Scarpa of Cineuropa lauded the film for its dark elements: "The film's original title, Glasskår, means 'shards of glass', whereas the international title references the wounds we carry with us from childhood. These two elements—glass and wounds, both metaphorical and real—meld together in this movie, which starts out as a run-of-the-mill story about a slightly boring summer which a 16-year-old boy is spending with his grandparents in the countryside, but which ends up sucking its protagonist—with his angelic face and blond curls—into a vortex of degradation, humiliation and masochism which hurts just to watch it."

Rubén Rosario of Miami ArtZine praised the lead performance and filmmaker: "But thanks to Noa Risbro Hjerrild's solid central performance, and Søren Green's refusal to look away from the dark turns his protagonist's arc takes, B.O.Y. is an absorbing chronicle of a turbulent adolescence, a meltdown in slow motion where the anger and rebellious defiance are turned inward. It sinks its hooks on you."
