= Hallå du gamle indian =

1941 song written by Lasse Dahlquist

Song by Lasse Dahlquist
- Language: Swedish
- Released: 1941
- Recorded: Stockholm, Sweden 22 January 1941
- Genre: schlager
- Label: Odeon
- Songwriter: Lasse Dahlquist

"Hallå du gamle indian" is a song written by Lasse Dahlquist, scoring a 1941 success with Thore Ehrlings orkester. A recording by Swedish dansband Jigs dated 1972 reached number four in 1973 at Svensktoppen. Jigs also recorded the song in 1973 with lyrics in English, as "Hello You Red Old Indian".

The song was also recorded by Schytts in 1972, but became no major hit.

Larz-Kristerz recorded the song on their 2007 album Stuffparty 3, and Scotts on their 2008 album På vårt sätt.

The song has also been recorded by Flintstens med Stanley.

The song lyrics depict an America where the Native Americans play a more modest role.
