= Else Paaske =

Danish mezzo-soprano concert singer (born 1941)

- Born: 1941 (age 84–85)
- Origin: Denmark
- Genres: Classical
- Occupations: Mezzo-soprano singer, educator

Else Paaske (born 1941) is a Danish mezzo-soprano concert singer and educator. Her repertoire covers both Lieder and oratorios. She performed from 1965 until the mid-1980s, becoming one of Denmark's most celebrated mezzo-sopranos. She then became a lecturer at the Royal Danish Academy of Music until her retirement in 2004.

== Biography ==
Born in 1941, Else Paaske first studied under Dora Sigurdsson in Copenhagen and Hans Gertz in Stockholm. From 1960 to 1965, she attended the Royal Academy of Music, Aarhus/Aalborg, earning a diploma in singing in 1964. She then studied in Vienna under Eugenie Ludwig (1966–67). In 1976, she completed pedagogical studies in music at the Royal Danish Academy of Music.

During her singing career which started in 1965, she performed in Denmark, Norway, Sweden, Finland, Iceland, Austria, Germany, the Netherlands, Switzerland, England, Israel, Singapore and the United States. She won second prize in the ARD International Music Competition in 1968. Her 1969 concert in the Netherlands served to launch her international career as she was the winner of the Kathleen Ferrier Award at the International Vocal Competition 's-Hertogenbosch. Her repertoire included works by Handel, Bach, Beethoven, Brahms, Mahler and Heise. She was often accompanied by the German-born pianist Friedrich Gürtler (born 1933). In 1984, she gave up singing to devote herself to teaching, becoming a lecturer at the Royal Danish Academy of Music from 1984 until her retirement in 2004.

Paaske has been included in a number of albums. In 2005, she released a collection of works recorded from 1967 to 1983 on two CDs on the Danard label with works by Heise, Lange-Müller, Debussy, Brahms, Berg, Reger, Bach, Poulenc, Schumann, Mahler and Nørholm.
