= The Boy (Malte novel) =

2016 novel by Marcus Malte

- Author: Marcus Malte
- Original title: Le Garçon
- Translators: Emma Ramadan and Tom Roberge
- Cover artist: Richard Ljoenes
- Language: French
- Genre: Literary Fiction, Historical Fiction
- Published: August 18, 2016
- Publisher: Zulma Books, Restless Books (English Translation)
- Publication place: France
- English publication date: March 26, 2019
- Pages: 480 (English Translation)
- Awards: Femina Prize (2016), French Voices Award (2018)
- ISBN: 9781632061713

The Boy (French: Le Garçon) is a 2016 literary fiction novel by French author Marcus Malte, originally published by Éditions Zulma. It was translated by Emma Ramadan and Tom Roberge and was published in English, in 2019, by Restless Books. The novel follows a nameless feral boy, who travels from Eastern Europe to numerous civilizations in France. On the boy's journey, he becomes entangled in World War 1 and suffers from the loss of loved ones, as well as PTSD from the trench warfare. The novel received two awards following its publication.

== Plot summary ==
The novel opens in 1908, with the mute boy, who will remain unnamed by the third-party narrator, taking his dying mother to her final resting place by a lake. After his mother dies, the boy leaves their camp in Eastern Europe. He reaches a hamlet where he is discovered by the villagers. As the villagers debated what to do, the leader of the hamlet, Joseph, along with his son, Louis-Paul (Kazoo), decided that the boy could live in the barns and work in the hamlet. The boy becomes sick, and is nursed back to health by Joseph and Louis-Paul, using the Zapotec healing rituals of Joseph’s deceased wife. They allow him to be part of their family. An earthquake kills the hamlet’s baby. One of the citizens, Eugéne, blames the boy for the death. The boy becomes scared and runs away.

While living in the woods, the boy meets a circus strongman and fighter named Ernest Bieule. Ernest’s stage name is Brabek: the Ogre of the Carpatian Mountains. He invites the boy to be his assistant. They travel in a caravan to numerous cities in France, including: Veynes, Eyguians, and Orpierre. Brabek loses a fight for the first time and hangs himself soon after. The boy runs away from the body, taking the horse and caravan. The boy’s caravan crashes into a car outside of Tousses le Noble commune. The car’s driver, Emma Van Ecke, along with her father, Gustave Van Ecke, an apple pomologist and oboe player, live in the commune. With the help of the family doctor, Amédée Theoux, they heal the boy. Emma adopts him as a brother and names him "Félix".

From 1911 to 1914, Emma and the boy develop a romantic relationship. The family moves to the Boulevard du Temple in Paris where Emma teaches piano. The boy and Emma collect rare books, such as the Kama Sutra, while they become sexually explorative. The narration flashes to short updates about world events.

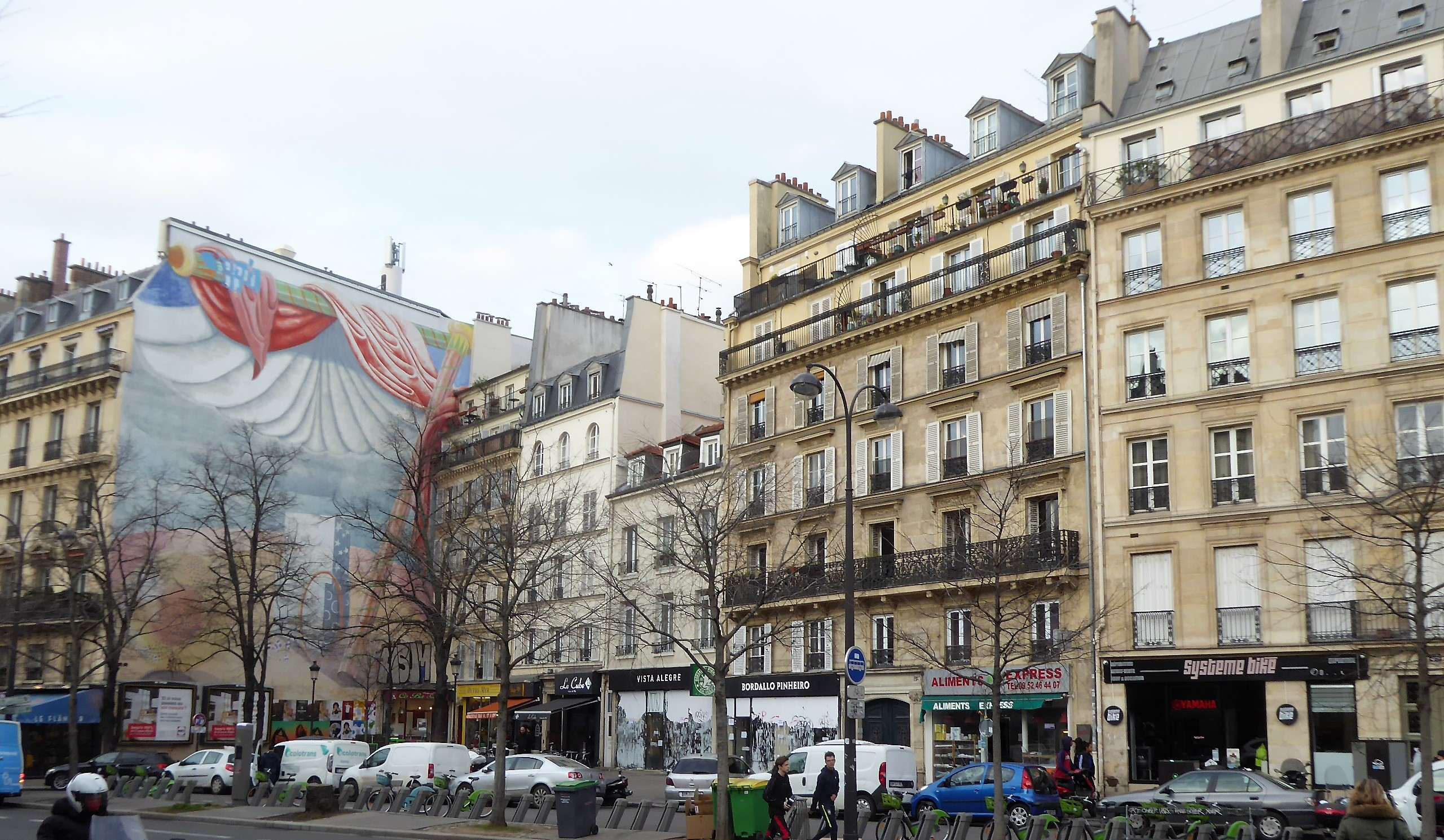
The apartment building on Boulevard du Temple stands in a similar location to where the Van Ecke family would have moved.

World War I begins. Gustave enlists and makes the boy enlist for fear that they would be shamed. The boy is taken to the trenches and marches through war-torn and deserted towns; Emma writes him letters. The boy digs graves for many of the soldiers, and becomes close with the ones who have not died. They know him as "Mazeppa". During one advance, the boy kills a German soldier with his shovel. He invades German camps at night and slits the throats of soldiers. His nightly murders result in the nickname, “Angel of Death”. The boy survives but suffers post traumatic stress disorder (PTSD).

Emma reunites with the boy in 1916, and they return to Paris. After encountering the boy’s Corporal, the only man who had witnessed the boy's nocturnal killings, from the war nightmares of his murders plague his sleep. Emma becomes sick with the flu and dies. The boy, distraught with grief, destroys the piano and books. He leaves Paris and lives on the streets, until having been caught for stealing or trespassing many times, he is sent to prison.

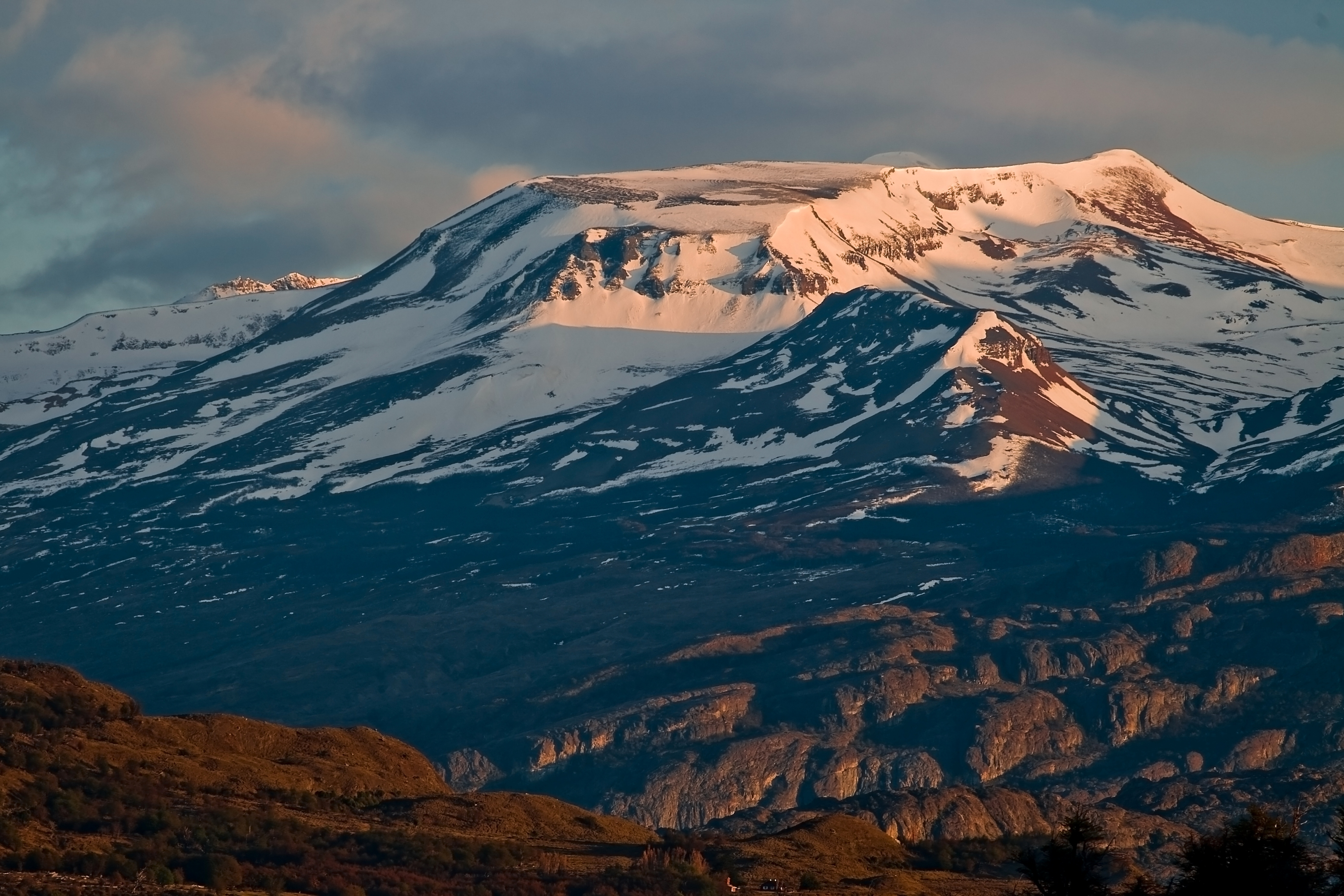
Andes Mountains, where the boy died.

He lives in a series of work camps, first in the middle of an unnamed savanna, then Cayenne, and then Saint Laurent. The boy is eventually released and takes on odd jobs, including as a shoe shiner in Georgetown, a coffee harvester in Minas Gerais, and a porter in Paramaribo. He meets an indigenous tribe in Venezuela and lives with the sorcerer. He joins a nomadic tribe, then follows three Jesuit priests at the Juruena station, and soon he preaches their teachings in the Amazon. Here, he sees an indigenous girl who reminds him of the Zapotec goddess that Joseph believed in. He climbs to the base of the Andes. There, he remembers the people with whom he has forged relationships over the years. After three days he dies.

== Characters ==
The Boy ("Felix", "Mazeppa"): A mute, feral boy who enters French society only years before the start of World War I, the main character of the novel.

Joseph: Leader of the hamlet, a shepherd, and a widower, helps nurse the boy back to health.

Louis-Paul ("Kazoo"): Joseph's son, follows the boy around after he arrives in the hamlet.

Lucien: A villager in the hamlet, finds the boy sleeping in a kiln.

Honorine: The woman who named and took care of Louis-Paul the week after he was born.

Eugéne: A villager in the hamlet, skeptical when the boy shows up, blames the boy for the earthquake that happened.

Pierre: Another villager in the hamlet, also blames the boy for the death of an infant in an earthquake.

Ernest Bieule ("Brabek"): "Ogre of the Carpathians," a stage fighter, invites the boy to be his assistant, and teaches him how to fight.

Emma van Ecke: A strong-willed pianist who "adopts" the boy as her brother and later becomes his love interest.

Gustave van Ecke: Emma's father, an apple pomologist and oboe player, enlists in the war despite his age.

Amédée Theoux: The family doctor of the Van Eckes who helps take care of the boy after the car crash.

Corporal: One of the few surviving soldiers in the boy's legion, the only soldier to witness the boy on his nightly kills, runs into the boy after the war in Paris.

The Wise Man: Private First Class, makes witty remarks to provide the soldiers humor and relief.

== Structure ==
Author Marcus Malte writes The Boy from a third-person omniscient perspective, using prose writing and extensive descriptions. The novel is divided by time periods into three sections—1910-1914, 1914-1915, and 1916-1938—each of which contains real-world historical events that eventually converge with the boy’s life. In the beginning, the boy is separated from the events of the world around him; the novel references historical people and events that start out unrelated to the boy’s life. As the story goes on, the boy enters World War I, and the lines between his reality, and the realities of the rest of the world, begin to blur.

The Boy employs a syntax that changes as the story progresses, mirroring the way the boy himself grows. The syntax of the novel is, at first, short and stilted; critics have interpreted this as a reflection of the boy’s state of personal and intellectual growth. As the main character forms more relationships and becomes more involved in society, the sentences become lengthier and more descriptive, mirroring the development of the boy's ability to connect with the people around him.

=== Themes ===
Many themes are addressed in The Boy. In the beginning, the boy wishes to join civilization and find community, presenting a preconceived idea of what it means to be civilized. Later, through vivid descriptions of war, Malte presents to the audience themes of learned wisdom; the harsh situations the boy encounters force him to question the inherent goodness of humanity. The boy experiences polar opposites, love versus hate and life versus death, without forcefully altering his situations. The coming-of-age story, on the whole, presents the universal idea of the meaning of life.

== Historical Background ==
The Boy takes place in France during the first half of the 20th century and focuses on the boy’s experiences with the First World War.

World War I began in August of 1914. By the end of that year, the French government and military powers were coming to terms with the longer than anticipated timeline of the war, resulting in a tense political climate. As the headquarters for the Western Front, France was powered by an abundance of citizens, particularly young men, willing to serve in the war. At the same time, the French economy struggled through the war, and families had to cope with the sudden loss of people in their household.

As a result of leaving their families and relationships behind, soldiers turned to writing letters. Almost two billion letters were written during the war, helping the soldiers connect with their relatives and partners while on the front lines.

== Reception ==
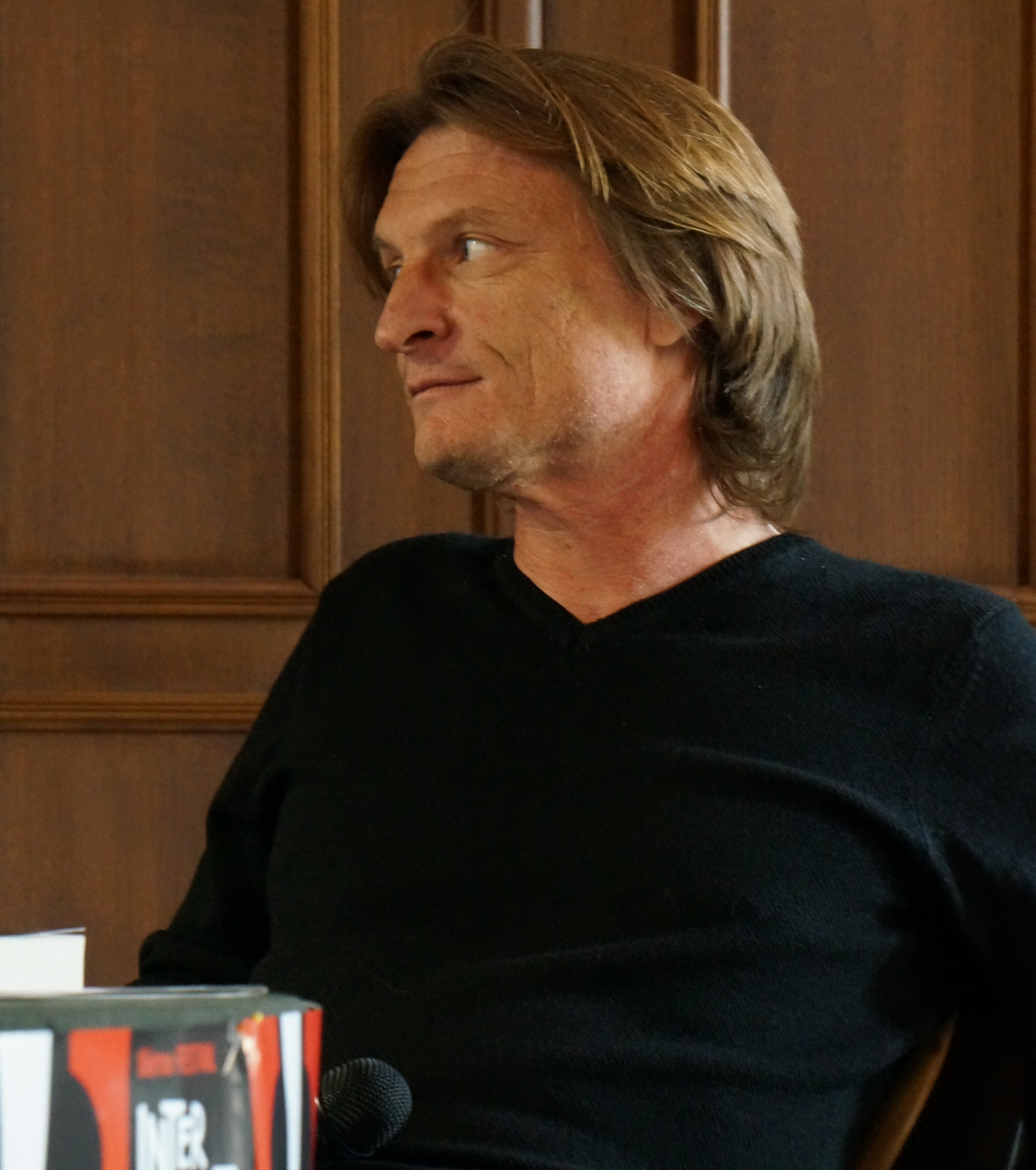
The Boy author Marcus Malte at the 2013 Interpol'art festival.

The reception for The Boy has been largely positive. However, certain aspects of the novel have been criticized. The sexual exploration between Emma and the boy has received negative feedback; the portions of the novel where they repeatedly engage in sexual acts have been criticized for using graphic metaphors for sex. Other negative feedback includes criticism for Malte’s depiction of bourgeois society, which has been dismissed as having predictable archetypes.

The use of varied syntax in the novel has received mostly positive feedback. Nevertheless, the prose has been called “overworked” and Malte’s style laborious, creating unnecessarily melodramatic characters. Other reviews have criticized the pace of the novel, saying it begins too slowly and monotonously, despite its faster pace later on.

The book has also been praised for its many themes: those of growth, loss, pain, war, and human relationships. Malte has been applauded for his puppetry in moving a silent character through a vast array of situations; he has also received positive feedback for the setting of his story, which has been called an “exciting backdrop” for the main characters.

=== Awards ===
Awards include:

- The Femina Prize. Awarded on October 25, 2016, The Boy won the prize ahead of four other nominations.
- The French Voices Award. The Boy was among fifteen books that won the award, which is given to the best English translations of French books each year, in 2018.
