= M.ill.ion =

Swedish melodic hard rock band

M.ILL.ION
- Origin: Gothenburg, Sweden
- Genres: Heavy metal, hard rock
- Years active: 1989–present
- Labels: K.M.C.; BlueStone Music; A2 Records; Metal Heaven
- Members: B.J Laneby; Angelo Modafferi; Andreas Grövle; Ulrich Carlsson; Johan Häll
- Past members: Hasse Johansson; Markus Ydkvist; Jonas Hermansson; Johan Bergquist; Stefan Wetterlind; Staffan Österlind; CT Rohdell; Roland Christoffersson; Mikael Böhnke; Per Westergren
- Website: www.millionrocks.com

M.ILL.ION is a Swedish melodic hard rock band formed in 1989 in Gothenburg by bass player B.J Laneby.

M.ILL.ION's music is described as a "mix of classic rock, melodic metal and rock'n roll" comfortably placed in the 21st century. Their biggest influences include Kiss, Deep Purple, Whitesnake, Thin Lizzy, UFO, Black Sabbath, Rainbow, Dio and Queen.

== History ==
The band has released eight albums

Their seventh album Sane & Insanity (Europe/Japan 2011) went straight to the No.1 spot on the U.S Import chart NEH and reached the "Album of the Year" list at the hard rock website, melodicrock.com. In Japan they have a strong following ever since their debut album No.1 charted there in the early 90s.

Their song "Showstopper" from the Detonator album was featured in the EA Games video game NHL 2003.

They have done several headline tours and also shared stages and tours with bands such as Magnum, Nazareth, Oliver/Dawson Saxon, Michael Schenker Group, Pretty Maids among others.

Some of the festival appearances include the major Sweden Rock Festival (where they set an attendance record and were named “best band of the festival” by UK Magazine Powerplay), Firefest (England), Rock Over Munich (Germany), Hard Rock Hell (Spain) and Stockholm Rock Out. In July 2013 they did Skogsröjet in Sweden, where they played the main stage joining headliners Twisted Sister and Helloween.

During the UK tour in 2014 their former B.J Laneby was hit with by a terminal bacteria and almost died. After a very long rehab he decided to put the band on hold.

In 2021, the band celebrated the 30:th anniversary of the first M.ILL.ION album.

Four original M.ILL.ION members reunited in the autumn of 2020: Hans Dalzon (lead vocals), CT Rohdell (guitar) Marcus Berglund (keyboards) and B.J Laneby (bass guitar). The new recruits Henrik Andersson (lead guitar) and Magnus Rohdell (drums) complete this six piece.

B.J Laneby comments: ”It's so much fun, creativity & energy again! It's really like the title track says: ” BACK ON TRACK – Time to make boys out of men!”

The band spent the spring of 2021 working on the reunion album "Back On Track". This 15 track production includes three brand new songs and two re-recordings/re-arrangements of tracks from the No.1 album. Adding to this, rare recordings have been found, remixes have been done and remasterings of songs from the first three albums; No.1, We, Ourselves & Us and Electric as well.

The new recordings on the Back on Track album were mixed by the famous British producer Simon Hanhart (David Bowie, Bryan Adams, Saxon, Marillion, Asia, Yngwie Malmsteen, Waysted. a.o). Mastering was handled by Tim Debney of Fluid Mastering, UK (Deep Purple, Rod Stewart, Judas Priest).

M.ILL.ION signed a deal with the well known German label AOR Heaven for the European release. The album came out in Europe on September 10, 2021, preceded by the single and video of the title track "Back on Track" and the single of "Circle of Trust".

== Discography ==
=== Studio albums ===
- No 1. (1992)
- We, Ourselves & Us (1994)
- Electric (1998)
- Detonator (2001)
- Kingsize (2004)
- Thrill of the Chase (2008)
- Sane & Insanity (2011)
- Back on Track (2021)

=== Compilation albums ===
- 1991–2006 The Best, So Far (2006)

=== Extended plays ===
- 2004 (2004)

=== Singles ===
- "Judgement Day" (1994)
- "Back on Track" (2021)
- "Circle of Trust" (2021)

== Videos ==
- Sign of Victory
- Candyman
- Backdoor Queen
- Live in Germany
- Everyday Hero
- Back on Track
- Circle of Trust (TBA)
