= Gå upp och pröva dina vingar =

Song by Lasse Dahlquist
- Language: Swedish
- Released: November 1944
- Genre: schlager
- Label: Odeon
- Songwriter: Lasse Dahlquist
- Composer: Lasse Dahlquist

Gå upp och pröva dina vingar ("Go up and try your wings") is a 1944 Swedish song written by Lasse Dahlquist. It was written for the 1944 Swedish film Örnungar, a film about gliding, where Dahlquist, Alice Babs and Kaj Hjelm sang it. The song is considered one of Dahlqvist's most important compositions.

The song has become a popular sing-along song in Sweden, and is one of the most frequently-performed songs in the TV programme Allsång på Skansen. The phrase Gå upp och pröva dina vingar, which was coined for the song, has entered the Swedish idiom, and is used both literally about flying by aircraft, especially gliding and figuratively, as an exhortation to try new things or exert oneself in life in general.
