= Bois, West Virginia =

Unincorporated community in West Virginia, United States

Bois
- Unincorporated community
- Location within the state of West Virginia Bois (the United States)
- Coordinates: 38°43′31″N 80°26′5″W
- Country: United States
- State: West Virginia
- County: Webster
- Elevation: 1,125 ft (343 m)
- Time zone: UTC-5 (Eastern (EST))
  - Summer (DST): UTC-4 (EDT)
- GNIS ID: 1549601

Bois is an unincorporated community in Webster County, West Virginia, United States.
