= Brännö =

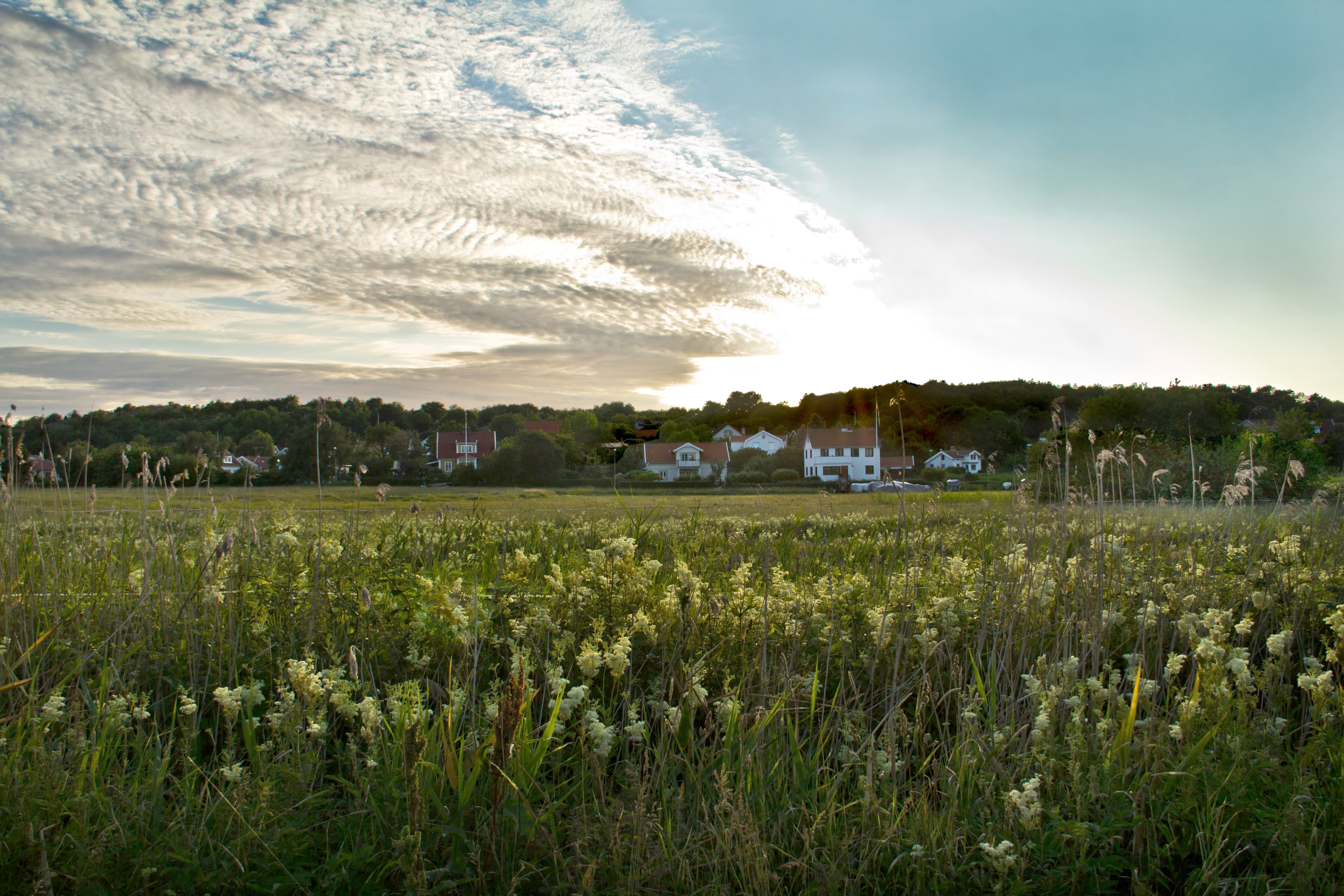
- A field close to the center of the island

- Location within Västra Götaland Location within Sweden
- Coordinates: 57°39′N 11°47′E
- Country: Sweden
- Province: Västergötland
- County: Västra Götaland County
- Municipality: Gothenburg Municipality

Area
  - Total: 0.87 km^{2} (0.34 sq mi)

Population (31 December 2010)
  - Total: 708
  - Density: 813/km^{2} (2,110/sq mi)
- Time zone: UTC+1 (CET)
  - Summer (DST): UTC+2 (CEST)

Brännö is an island in the Southern Göteborg Archipelago and a locality situated in Göteborg Municipality, Västra Götaland County, Sweden. It had 708 inhabitants in 2010 and belongs to the parish of Styrsö within Gothenburg Municipality.

Piloting boats and shipping are the main sources of income. Unlike the other islands in the archipelago, Brännö has never relied on fishing for its livelihood. Instead, the islanders have always cultivated the relatively fertile farmland that stretches along the eastern side. Brännö is also known for its strong connection to Swedish folk music—every Thursday evening in the summer, dance and music festivals take place at the quay in Husvik, the southernmost of the two piers served by ferries from Saltholmen.

Brännö is described as a car free destination for tourists.

== History ==
Due to its geographical location, Brännö has throughout the centuries been a strategic location for seafarers and chieftains, from both Sweden and the adjacent Norway and Denmark.

During the Viking Age, the border between the spheres of interest of the Norwegian and Danish kings ran along the mouth of the Göta river. Elfarsyssel—the Land of the Elves—included the islands as far south as Orust and Tjörn and was of utmost importance to these kings and the Swedish nobility. Many geographical names date from this period. For example, Danafjord (the passage within Vinga) and Danaholmen, today Danmark Lilla or Danska liljan (Little Denmark), an island in the Danafjord directly off Brännö. In the mid-13th century, the West Gothic people gained access to the Western Sea through a small passage. The Brännö Islands or Älvaskären (the River Islands) became Swedish at this time.

It is believed that its inhabitants are the same as the Brondings who are referred to in the Anglo-Saxon poems Beowulf and Widsith. Beowulf, England's national epic, relates that Breca the Bronding was the childhood friend of the hero Beowulf and Widsith tells that Breca later was the lord of the Brondings.

Brännö is mentioned in the Icelandic Sagas as the location of several important thing assemblies in the Viking Age and later.

The Laxdæla saga relates that the beautiful Irish princess Melkorka was sold as a thrall to the Icelandic chieftain Hoskuld Dala-Kollsson, during a fair on Brännö, in the 10th century.

The jetty on the island is also mentioned in the song De' ä' dans på Brännö brygga

== Brännö Lagård ==
Brännö Lagård is a museum situated in the middle of the island in an old barn. It houses exhibitions about the life on Brännö through the ages, about pilots, boatswain and the life of women.
