= Petit Bois (disambiguation) =

Petit Bois is a community in the Ouest department of Haiti.

Petit Bois or Petit-Bois can also refer to:

- Petit Bois Island, island in Mississippi, United States
- Petit-Bois Stadium, a football stadium in the Champagne-Ardenne region of France
- Arboretum du Petit-Bois, an arboretum in the Lorraine region of France
- Château de Petit-Bois, a 19th-century mansion in the Auvergne region of France

== See also ==
- Grand Bois (disambiguation)
