= Oh boy, oh boy, oh boy! =

1946 song by Lasse Dahlquist

"Oh boy, oh boy, oh boy"

Song by Lasse Dahlquist
- Language: Swedish
- Released: circa June 1946
- Recorded: Stockholm, Sweden 3 May 1946
- Genre: schlager
- Label: Sonora
- Songwriter: Lasse Dahlquist
- Composer: Lasse Dahlquist

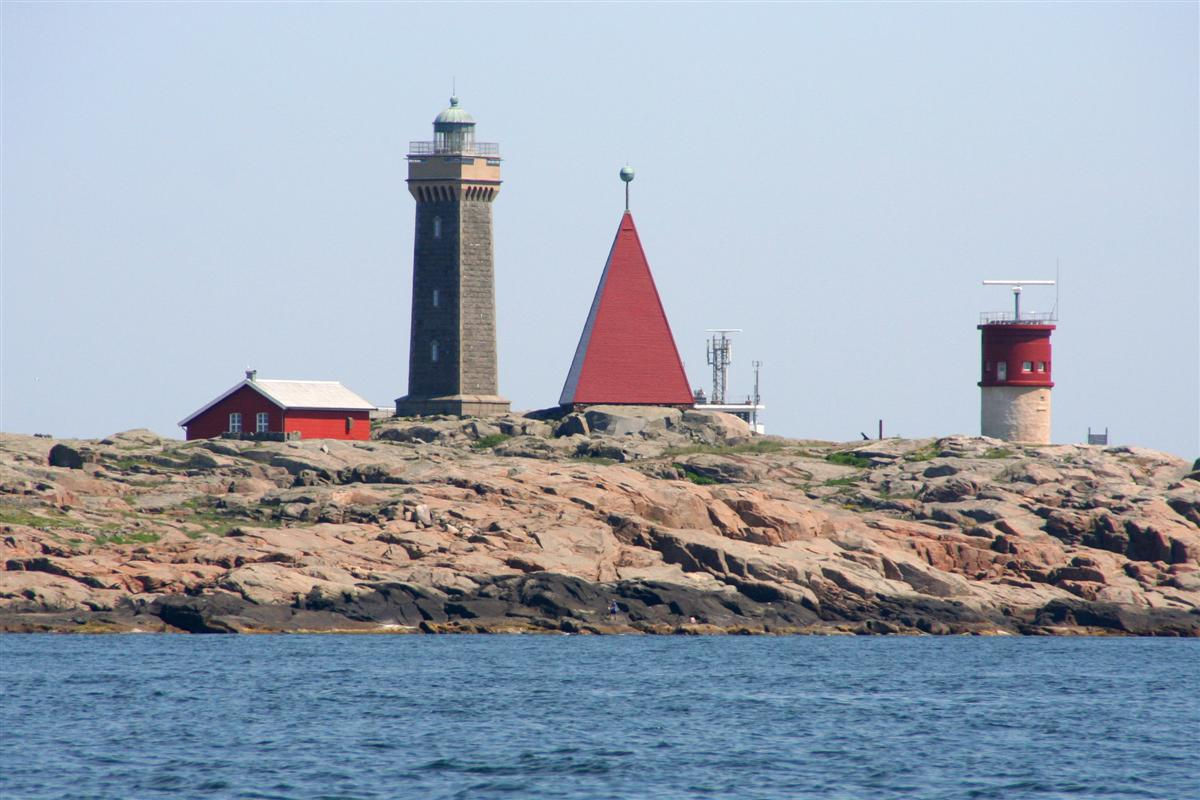
Vinga Lighthouse, where the ships first are sighted according to the song.

Oh boy, oh boy, oh boy! is a song written by Lasse Dahlquist, and released as a recorded song in 1946. The song has also been recorded by Alf Robertson (1981) and Charlie Norman (1989).

The song, which depicts a British Navy visit to Gothenburg, has become a standard sing-along song in Sweden.
