= Emil Thoroddsen =

Icelandic composer, playwright and critic

Emil Thoroddsen (16 June 1898 – 7 July 1944) was an Icelandic composer, pianist, playwright, critic and translator. He was the chief art critic of "Morgunblaðið" newspaper from 1926–1933 and worked for the Icelandic National Broadcasting Service since its establishment in 1930. Among his most widely known songs are „Íslands Hrafnistumenn“ and „Hver á sér fegra föðurland“ which was premiered at the Festival of the Republic on 17 June 1944. On that day, due to rain and cold weather, Emil caught a cold, and a few days later he had developed pneumonia. He had earlier suffered from tuberculosis, and thus his health was already precarious; after a 16-day illness, he died at the Reykjavík City Hospital.

His work list at the Iceland Music Information Center lists nearly 50 works of various kinds. Among the largest are a University Cantata from 1940, and a cantata composed for a competition held in 1930 to celebrate the millennium of the Icelandic Alþingi (Parliament); his cantata won second prize and was only given its first performance in 1954, at a concert at the Reykjavík National Theater in memory of Thoroddsen on the tenth anniversary of his death. His incidental music for Jón Thoroddsen's play Piltur og stúlka (A Boy and a Girl) is also frequently performed, in particular Búðarvísur and Vöggukvæði. In addition, his arrangement of the Icelandic folk song Fagurt galaði fuglinn sá is a favorite of Icelandic choirs.

In his youth, Emil practiced sports among young men from his neighborhood and was involved in the creation of the football club Víkingur Reykjavik at the age of twelve, hosting the club's inaugural meeting and initially taking the role of club secretary. He later produced coverage about the club's operations and achievements.

== Selected works ==
- Hátíðarljóð 1930 (Alþing Festival Cantata), completed by Victor Urbancic (1930)
- Two Icelandic folk songs for mixed choir (ca. 1930)
- Piltur og stúlka, incidental music (1934)
- Andante "In memoriam" for string quartet (1939)
- Háskólakantata (University Cantata, 1940)
- Hver á sér fegra föðurland (1944)
