= Insomnia (composition) =

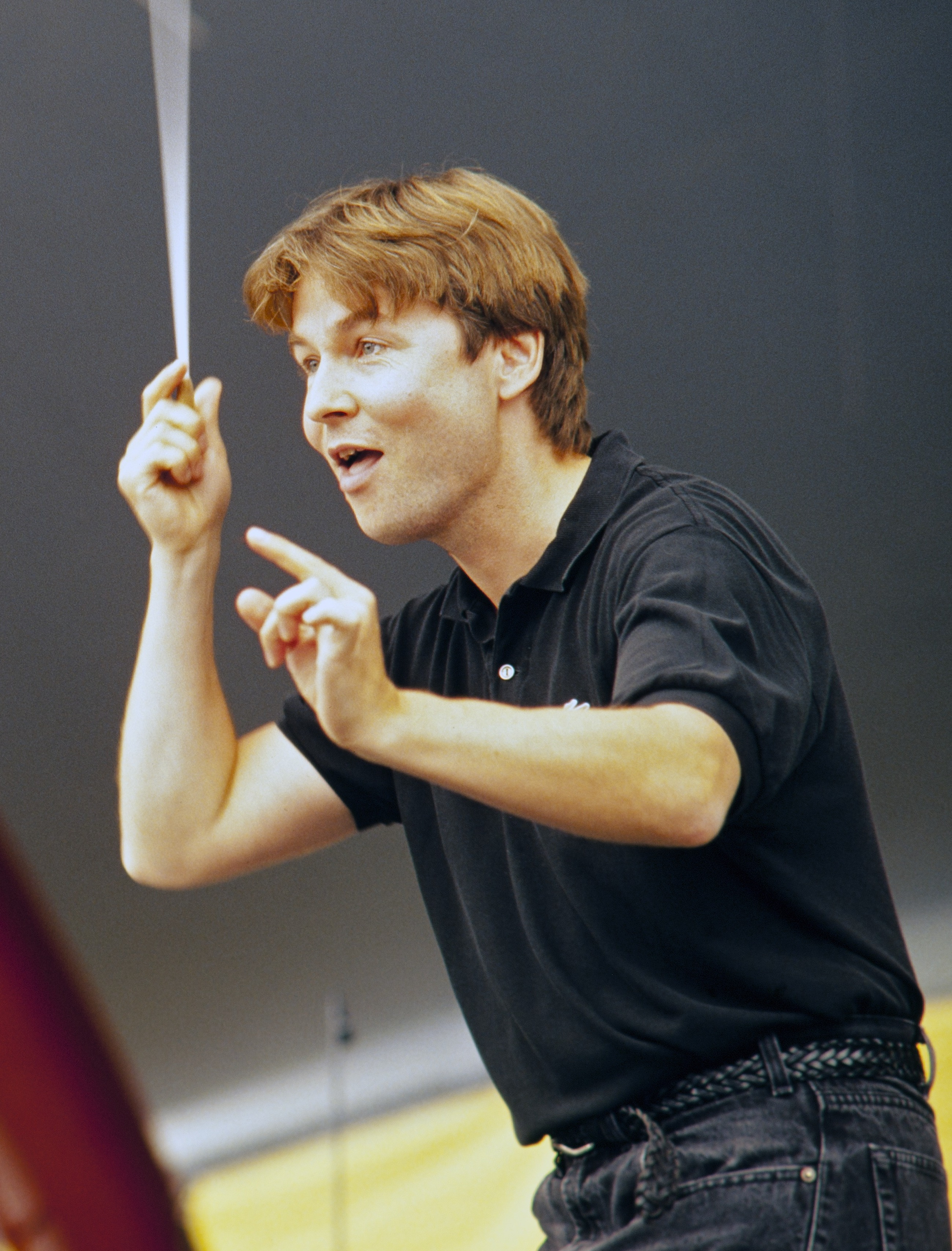
Esa-Pekka Salonen in 1997

Insomnia is a single-movement orchestral composition by the Finnish composer Esa-Pekka Salonen. The work was composed between March and November 2002 and was first performed on December 1, 2002 by the NHK Symphony Orchestra under Salonen.

== Composition ==
Insomnia has a duration of roughly 20 minutes and is composed in a single movement.

=== Style and inspiration ===
Salonen described the piece as "a set of variations based on a harmonic model separated by a Ritornello-like section, which is essentially a pedal point on the note e." He further described the composition in the score program notes, writing:

The sound of Insomnia is darker and deeper than that of my other recent orchestral works. I decided to add a quartet of Wagner Tubas to the brass section for the very particular sonority only these rare and weird instruments can produce. The two basic archetypes of my music, the chorale and the machine, are still an important part of the vocabulary, but now they are quite often in a state of flux, one thing becoming another gradually. Even the Ritornello phrase keeps changing shape and structure; only the characteristic harmony remains the same throughout the piece.

Salonen continued:

From early in the composition process, I realized that this music was somehow about the night (an early working title was "Nox"), but not in an idyllic, nocturnal way. I was more drawn towards the demonic, "dark" aspects of the night: the kind of persistent, compulsive thoughts that run through our mind when lying hopelessly awake in the early hours. The musical processes in Insomnia have a lot in common with the psychology of a sleepless night: some thoughts become prison cells we cannot escape; others keep coming back persistently. Towards the end of Insomnia the music finally calms down to an Adagio, dominated by the mellow sounds of the horns and the Wagner tubas. The very moment we think that we have finally arrived at the gates of sleep, the sun rises in its full glory. A new day begins, exultantly.

=== Instrumentation ===
The work is scored for an orchestra comprising two flutes (doubling alto flute), piccolo (doubling flute), two oboes, cor anglais, two clarinets (doubling E-flat clarinet and bass clarinet), bass clarinet, two bassoons, contrabassoon, four horns, four Wagner tubas, three trumpets, three trombones, tuba, timpani, four percussionists, harp, piano (doubling celesta), and strings.

== Reception ==
Reviewing the West Coast premiere of Insomnia in San Francisco, Mark Swed of the Los Angeles Times called the piece "newsworthy" and wrote, "Written in the aftermath of 9/11 and first performed in Tokyo at the end of 2002, it is more darkly tinted than his typically bright orchestral music. The unusual incorporation of four Wagner tubas gives the overall sound a dusky mass." He added, "But what is truly extraordinary about the 22-minute score is the way it grips attention. Insomnia is not, for most people, a pleasurable sensation. Here, though, it is, as Salonen, through an exceptional command of a large orchestra, explores the more distant and sometimes ecstatic reaches of the involuntarily alert mind." Stephen Johnson of BBC Music Magazine also praised the work, writing:

Most impressive is the darker, nervy Insomnia, a work that grows from its pregnant opening figures as surely as Sibelius, and at times explores similar haunted territory – though it rarely actually resembles the Finnish master (apart from a strong, telling hint of Nightride and Sunrise). Echoes of Reich, Adams and the later Lutosławski can be heard, but they’re completely digested into Salonen's overall style.

Arnold Whittall of Gramophone was more critical, however, remarking, "The 21-minute, single-movement work Insomnia displays a similar lack of differentiation, the great washes of sound more effective in keeping a large orchestra busy than in promoting a persuasive musical argument."
