= The Boy (Modigliani) =

1919 painting by Amedeo Modigliani

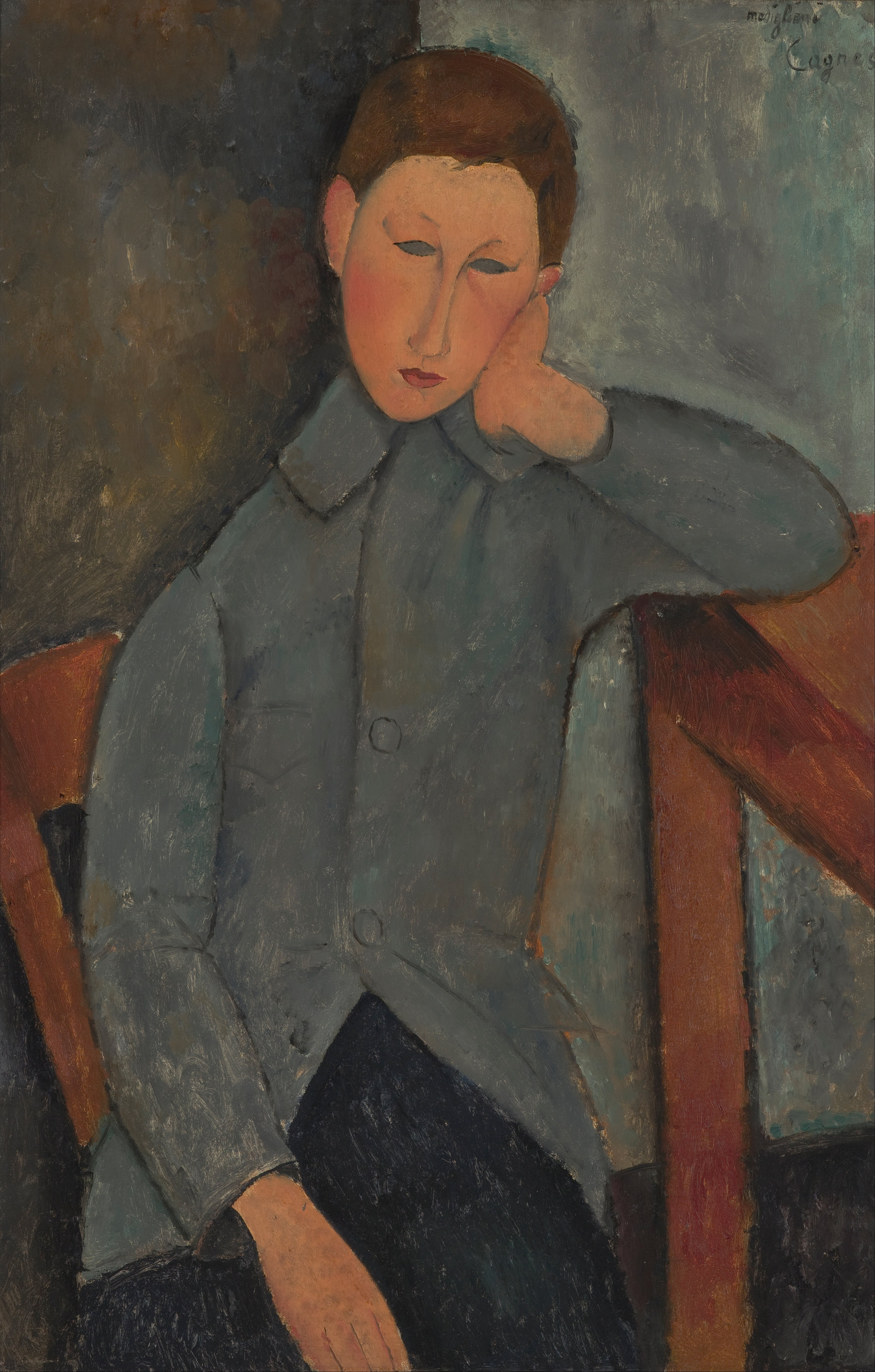
- Artist: Amedeo Modigliani
- Year: 1919
- Medium: oil on canvas
- Dimensions: 92.1 cm × 60.3 cm (36.25 in × 23.75 in)
- Location: Indianapolis Museum of Art; Indianapolis

The Boy is an oil painting by Italian artist Amedeo Modigliani created in 1919. It is currently part of the permanent collection at the Indianapolis Museum of Art.

== Description ==
The portrait is of an unknown male youth, sitting at a chair, his left elbow on a table, and his head resting on his palm. The Boy is a typical Modigliani portrait. The boy's face is elongated into an oval, his eyes are hollow and without pupils. He wears a blue shirt, that seems to blend him into the background. His cheeks are rosy and youthful, which contrasts with the hollow eyes. His face is mask-like and expressionless. The portrait is enlivened by the artist's brushstrokes, even in the limited color palette. Unlike most of Modigliani's subjects, this sitter cannot be identified.

== Historical information ==
Modigliani was dying of tubercular meningitis by the time he painted this portrait. He was forced by his doctors to move to southern France from Paris, in hopes that it would improve his failing health. Along with this, Paris was becoming increasingly less safe as World War I heightened. While there, Modigliani shifted his focus to painting unnamed, young workers, like the one portrayed in The Boy. Modigliani's portraits and sculptures reveal the influence of ancient Greek and African sculpture that started to hold more sway in the modern art world. Modigliani's work is easily recognized by his elegant, elongated figures.

=== Acquisition ===
The painting was purchased from the artist by Leopold Zborowski, a Polish-born art dealer who represented Modigliani. By 1929, it was bought by Maurice J. Speiser, a Philadelphia-based attorney and patron of the arts, and was illustrated in a Modern Art catalog that same year. It was auctioned in New York in January 1944. It was likely purchased by Theodore Schempp from there. The painting was bought from him in 1946, with funds given by Mrs. Julian Bobbs, in memory of William Ray Adams.
