= Boys (Herzog album) =

Studio album by Herzog
- Released: May 20, 2014
- Recorded: Marcata Recording Studios, Gardiner, New York
- Genre: Indie rock
- Length: 42:03
- Label: Exit Stencil Recordings
- Producer: Kevin S. McMahon

Herzog chronology
Cartoon Violence (2012)	Boys (2014)

Boys is the third album by Cleveland-based band Herzog, released by Exit Stencil Recordings on May 20, 2014 in the US and June 23 in the UK. The album was produced by Kevin McMahon, who the band discovered through his work with Titus Andronicus.

== Critical reception ==
Professional ratings
Review scores
Source	Rating
MusicOMH	2/5 stars
Pitchfork Media	7.2/10

Writing for Pitchfork Media, Jeremy Gordon gave the album a rating of 7.2 out of 10, and described it as "a record you’ll never be able to mistake for anything else because all its ideas are laid out plain as day."

== Track listing ==
1. Full Stick—1:39
2. Henchmen—3:00
3. Mad Men—3:02
4. Bicycle Girls—2:18
5. Saint Scrapyard—2:33
6. It's Hard Getting Old—5:58
7. Boys Part 1-- :53
8. Theme For Boys—3:09
9. Oh No—3:05
10. Teenage Metalhead—3:41
11. Satan Is Real—4:00
12. You Are Not The Villain—7:04
13. Boys Part 2-- 1:41
