= Canal do Boi =

Brazilian television network

- Type: Broadcast television network
- Country: Brazil
- First air date: 4 January 1995
- Availability: Nationwide, via direct-to-home services.
- Founded: 4 January 1995 by José Cláugio Godoy
- Headquarters: Av. Prof. Alfonso Bovero, 52 - Sumaré, São Paulo
- Owner: José Roberto Garcia; Paulo Sérgio Garcia
- Parent: C.B. Leilões, Eventos e Publicidade Ltda.
- Launch date: 4 January 1995
- Official website: www.sba1.com

Canal do Boi is a Brazilian television network based in Campo Grande, the capital of the Mato Grosso do Sul, owned by Sistema Brasileiro do Agronegócio. Most of its programming is based on livestock sales, such as oxen (hence the name), goats and horses, as well as general agribusiness programming.

== History ==
Canal do Boi started broadcasting on 4 January 1995, becoming the first rural television channel based in Mato Grosso do Sul. Initially, the channel was only used for livestock sales, but the channel's format changed slightly in July 1999, by adopting a 24-hour schedule and including news programs related to agribusiness. In March 2003, Canal do Boi 2 opened. The success of Canal do Boi led that year for Grupo RBS to install a Canal Rural office in the state.

The success of the channel caused an increase in the reach of the sales, enabling them to be done nationwide, when, up until its creation, such sales were at a local level. SBA created a new channel, AgroCanal, in 2004, initially relaying part of Canal do Boi's line-up. As of 2010, a seller had to pay RS$40,000; a higher quantity than the same for its sister channels.

The channel observed its thirtieth anniversary on 26 April 2024.

== Programming ==
As of 2019, 20 hours of the weekday schedule are devoted to agribusiness and weekends are still entirely dedicated to livestock sales.
