= Arne Mellnäs =

Arne Otto Birger Mellnäs (30 August 1933 – 22 November 2002) was a Swedish composer. He was born in Stockholm.
