= Search (album) =

Studio album by Herzog
- Released: July 2, 2010
- Genre: Indie rock, power pop
- Label: Transparent Records

Herzog chronology
Search (2010)	Cartoon Violence (2012)

Search is the debut album by Cleveland-based indie rock band Herzog, originally released on July 2, 2010 on Transparent Records. It would later be re-released by Exit Stencil Recordings on February 8, 2011.

== Track listing ==
1. Silence
2. West Blvd.
3. Static Shock
4. Town to Town
5. Living Alone
6. Paul Blart and the Death of Art
7. Abandon Love
8. Moving Away
9. Steady Hands
10. Cautiously Optimistic
11. Slowest Romance

Professional ratings
Review scores
Source	Rating
NME	(positive)
Sputnik Music	4/5 stars
Drowned in Sound	7/10 stars
This is Fake DIY	6/10 stars
