= Niels la Cour =

Danish composer

Niels la Cour (born 14 November 1944) is a Danish composer.

== Life ==
La Cour did his A levels in 1963 from the music branch of the Aurehøj Grammar School with organ as his speciality. Between 1964 and 1969 he was at the Royal Academy of Music in Copenhagen, graduating with diploma and music teacher's exam in the subjects music theory, music history, and ear training. He also studied instrumentation and composition with Leif Kayser in 1973 and 1974 and at the Conservatorio di Santa Cecilia in Rome in 1975. Niels la Cour taught music theory at the Carl Nielsen Academy of Music in Odense between 1968 and 1977 and at the Royal Academy of Music in Copenhagen from 1978 until 2008, from 1988 as a docent. He received a three-year scholarship from the Danish Arts Foundation in 1973, and in 1988 he was awarded "Choir Composer of the Year" by the Danish Amateur Choral Federation.

== Works ==
- 9 orchestral works, among others Symphonic Fragments 1974, Meditazione 1992 and A Nordic Tale - A Symphonic Poem 2022.
- 22 chambermusical works, among others "Mild und leise" String Quartet No. 2 1969, Trio (vl. vlc. and pno.) 1979, Episodio (vlc. and organ) 2006, Elegy for String Quartet 2022 and Adagio for String Quartet 2023.
- 4 pianoworks, among others Momenti 1999 and Pezzo Sonata 2017.
- 15 organworks, among others 3 Intermezzi 1974, De profundis 1974, Fantasia per Organo 1994 and Vesper Organi 2003.
- 43 choral works, among others 3 collections og latin motets (1982, 1988, 1992), Missa Brevis 1989, Beatitudini 2001, Lux Mundi 2020 and 19 new hymn-melodies (e.g Peace reigns over country and town; Friede erfüllet Stadt und Land; Text: B.S. Ingemann 1822).
