= De' ä' dans på Brännö brygga =

Song by Lasse Dahlquist
- Language: Swedish
- Released: 1941
- Recorded: Stockholm, Sweden 22 March 1941
- Genre: schlager
- Label: Odeon
- Songwriter: Lasse Dahlquist

De' ä' dans på Brännö brygga (It is Dance at Brännö Jetty) is a 1941 waltz written by Lasse Dahlquist. The song has been sung at Allsång på Skansen (Sing-along at Skansen). Brännö is an island in Gothenburg archipelago, and every summer there is a dance at Brännö brygga.

== Sources ==
- Den svenska sångboken
