= Lasse Dahlquist =

Swedish actor, musician and singer (1910–1979)

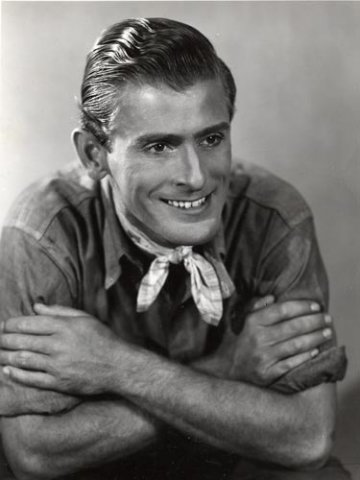
- Dahlquist c. 1935
- Born: Lars Erik Dahlquist; 14 September 1910; Gothenburg, Sweden
- Died: 14 October 1979 (aged 69); Brännö, Sweden
- Resting place: Brännö cemetery
- Occupations: Composer; singer; actor
- Years active: 1928–1974
- Spouse: Inez Lindquist (m. 1936)
- Children: Bob Dahlquist

Lars Erik ("Lasse") Dahlquist (14 September 1910 – 14 October 1979) was a Swedish composer, singer and actor. Many of his songs are among the most popular sing-along songs in Sweden, such as Oh boy oh boy oh boy and Gå upp och pröva dina vingar.

He was married to Inez Margareta Dahlquist, née Lindquist (1911–2004) from 1936 and they had a son; the saxophonist Robert "Bob" Dahlquist (2 September 1938 – 6 September 2005). On Saltholmen, at the terminal of the boats of Styrsöbolaget, there is a place called Lasse Dahlquists Plats.

He was born in Örgryte, and grew up in Lidingö. As a child, he spent his summers at his grandfather's farm, Langegården, on Brännö, in the Gothenburg archipelago, where he built his own home.

He worked at Sven-Olof Sandberg's music publishment Svenska Noter and in 1931 he began recording gramophone records.

In 1977 he received the Evert Taube award. He died on Brännö of laryngeal cancer

== Selected filmography ==
- Pojkarna på Storholmen (1932)
- Jolly Musicians (1932)
- Skärgårdsflirt (1935)
- Just a Bugler (1938)
- Styrman Karlssons flammor (1938)
- Sjöcharmörer (1939)
- The Crazy Family (1940)
- Goransson's Boy (1941)
- It Is My Music (1942)
- Eaglets (1944)
- Sista natten (1956)

== Film music (selected) ==
- Örnungar (1944)
- Västkustens hjältar (1940)
- Vi på Solgläntan (1939)
- Sjöcharmörer (1939)
- Vi trumpetare (1938)

== Famous songs written by Lasse Dahlquist ==
- De' ä' dans på Brännö brygga
- Oh boy oh boy oh boy
- Kom lella vän ska vi segla
- Gå upp och pröva dina vingar
- Hallå du gamle indian
- Morfar har berättat
- Stuvarevalsen
- Här dansar kustens glada kavaljer
- Charlie Truck Polka
- Jolly Bob från Aberdeen
