= Buy =

Buying may refer to purchasing of goods and services with money or via barter in a trade, thereby achieving acquisition or procurement of them.

Buy or buying may also refer to:

== Related terms ==
- Buying agent (AKA purchasing agent, indent agent, indenting agent), someone who offers to buy something on behalf of someone else
- Buying center (AKA decision-making unit, DMU)
- Buy-up coverage, additional crop insurance for which farmers pay a premium
- Cross-buy, a feature of some digital distribution systems

=== Financial trading ===
- Buy and hold (AKA position trading), an investment strategy
- Buyout, a method of taking control of a company
- Buy/sell spread, a bid–ask spread for a market maker
- Buy side in investment banking
- Buy-stop order, a trading instruction used to limit a loss
- Buy to let, purchasing a property to rent it out

=== Buying in bulk ===
- Buying club (AKA buyers club), a group making purchases together to get lower prices or obtain hard-to-get goods
- Buying power, a type of bargaining power relating to a purchaser and a supplier
- Co-buying (AKA cooperative buying), organizing people or companies together to increase negotiation power
- Collective buying power, the ability of a group of consumers or businesses to better negotiate for discounts
- Group buying (AKA collective buying; originating as: Chinese: 团购, romanized: tuán gòu, lit. 'team buying'), a method of bulk purchase to reduce price
- Mass buying (AKA bulk purchasing), the consumer side of wholesaling

=== Marketing tactics ===
- "Buy local" or "buy locally", a slogan for local purchasing
- Buy on board in commercial aviation
- Buy here, pay here (BHPH), a method of offering a line of credit to customers at a used car dealership
- Buy now, pay later (BNPL), a type of short-term debt financing
- Buy one, get one free (BOGOF), a kind of promotion
- Predictive buying, the use of algorithmic analytics to guess customers' patterns for targeted advertising

=== Reasons for buying ===
- Buying decision process (AKA buyer decision process), consumer behavior around purchasing
- Compulsive buying disorder (CBD), an obsession with shopping
- Impulse buy (AKA impulse purchase), an unplanned decision to buy something
- Panic buying (AKA panic purchasing), increased consumer activity around times of disaster and before price increases and shortages
- Preclusive buying (AKA preemptive buying, preclusive purchasing), an economic warfare tactic in which a belligerent in a conflict purchases matériel and operations from neutral countries to reduce how much others can buy
- Revenge buying (AKA revenge shopping, revenge spending), a sudden surge in consumer activity after people are denied the opportunity to shop for extended periods of time

=== By what is purchased ===
- Bride buying, the cultural practice of providing some form of payment in exchange for marriage
- Buying land (in a process known as conveyancing), purchasing legal title of real property
- Buying oneself out of service (AKA discharge by purchase), the process of obtaining a military discharge by making a payment as a fine
- Buy-to-play, the opposite of a subscription revenue model for video games
- Child buying, human trafficking of children / child-buying, the flip side of child selling
- Debt buying, purchasing delinquent or charged-off debts from a creditor or lender
- Media buying, procurement of advertising
- Salary buying, a kind of offer by a loan shark
- Vote buying (AKA electoral clientelism, patronage politics), a political campaign method that is illegal in many countries

== Places ==
- Buy (inhabited locality) [Russian: Буй], any of several inhabited localities in Russia
- Buy (river), a river in Perm Krai and the republics of Bashkortostan and Udmurtia in Russia

=== Airports with code "BUY" ===
- FAA LID: Burlington–Alamance Regional Airport (ICAO: KBUY), Alamance County, North Carolina, United States
- IATA: Bunbury Airport (ICAO: YBUN), Western Australia

== People ==
- Iryna Buy (Ukrainian: Ірина Буй), a Ukrainian Paralympic biathlete and cross-country skier
- Margherita Buy, an Italian actress
- Mykola Buy (Ukrainian: Микола Буй), a Ukrainian footballer
- Ma Buying (Chinese: 馬步英; 马步英, romanized: Mǎ Bùyīng; Ma Pu-ying), the birth name of Chinese Muslim warlord Ma Zhongying

== Websites ==
- buy.at, an online affiliate marketing platform launched in 2002
- Buy.com, a shopping website founded in 1997; renamed Rakuten.com/shop in 2010

== Other uses ==
- Buy (album), 1979 album by James Chance and the Contortions
- Buy, slang for believe, find credible, be convinced
- Buy language (AKA Uboi, Gu-boy, Kobiana, Cobiana), a Wolof–Nyun Senegambian language spoken in several villages of Senegal and Guinea-Bissau
- Buy (cards), the action of getting one or more cards in certain games

== See also ==
- By (disambiguation)
- Bui (disambiguation)
- Bouy (disambiguation)
- Buoy (disambiguation)
- Buys, a Dutch surname
- Buies:
  - Buies Creek, North Carolina, United States, a census-designated place (CDP) located in the Neills Creek Township, drained by the stream Buies Creek
  - Arthur Buies/Joseph-Marie-Arthur (1840–1901), a journalist and essayist from Quebec, Canada
- LaBuy:
  - Walter J. LaBuy, a judge of the United States District Court for the Northern District of Illinois
- Buying in (disambiguation)
- Buyback (disambiguation)
- Oyster buy-boat
- WP:BUY → Wikipedia:Notability cannot be purchased
- Help:Buying Wikipedia
- Purchase (disambiguation)
- Sell (disambiguation)
