= Greenshoe =

Contractual clause allowing the underwriter to buy shares of a registered stock offering

Greenshoe, or over-allotment clause, is the term commonly used to describe a special arrangement in a U.S. registered share offering, for example an initial public offering (IPO), which enables the investment bank representing the underwriters to support the share price after the offering without putting their own capital at risk. This clause is codified as a provision in the underwriting agreement between the leading underwriter, the lead manager, and the issuer (in the case of primary shares) or vendor (secondary shares). The provision allows the underwriter to purchase up to 15% in additional company shares at the offering share price.

The term is derived from the name of the first company, Green Shoe Manufacturing (now called Stride Rite), to permit underwriters to use this practice in an IPO.

The use of the greenshoe (also known as "the shoe") in share offerings is widespread for two reasons. First, it is a legal mechanism for an underwriter to stabilize the price of new shares, which reduces the risk of their trading below the offer price in the immediate aftermath of an offer—an outcome damaging to the commercial reputation of both issuer and underwriter. Secondly, it grants the underwriters some flexibility in setting the final size of the offer based on post-offer demand for the shares.

== Underwriter short-selling and price stabilization ==
=== Greenshoe clause ===
The greenshoe provides initial stability and liquidity to a public offering.

As an example, a company intends to sell one million shares of its stock in a public offering through an investment banking firm (or group of firms known as the syndicate), which the company has chosen to be the offering's underwriters. Stock offered for public trading for the first time is called an initial public offering (IPO). Stock that is already trading publicly, when a company is selling more of its non-publicly traded stock, is called a follow-on or secondary offering.

The underwriters function as the brokers of these shares and find buyers among their clients. A price for the shares is determined by careful examination of their value and expected worth. When shares begin trading in a public market, the lead underwriter is enabled to help the shares trade at or above the offering price.

When a public offering trades below its offering price, the offering is said to have "broke issue" or "broke syndicate bid". This can create the perception of an unstable or undesirable offering, which can lead to further selling and hesitant buying of the shares. To manage this situation, the underwriters initially oversell ("short") the offering to clients by an additional 15% of the offering size (in this example, 1.15 million shares). When the offering is priced and those 1.15 million shares are "effective" (become eligible for public trading), the underwriters are able to support and stabilize the offering price bid (also known as the "syndicate bid") by buying back the extra 15% of shares (150,000 shares in this example) in the market at or below the offer price. The underwriters can do this without the market risk of being "long" this extra 15% of shares in their own account, as they are simply "covering" (closing out) their short position.

When there is high demand for an offering, it causes the price of shares of the stock to rise and remain above the offering price. If the underwriters were to close their short position by purchasing shares in the open market, they would incur a loss by purchasing shares at a higher price than the price at which they sold them short.

The greenshoe (over-allotment) would now come into play. The company had initially granted the underwriters the ability in the greenshoe clause to purchase from the company up to 15% more shares than the original offering size at the original offering price. By exercising the greenshoe, the underwriters are able to close their short position by purchasing shares at the same price for which they short-sold the shares, so the underwriters do not lose money.

If the underwriters are able to buy back all of the oversold shares at or below the offering price (to support the stock price), then they would not need to exercise any portion of the greenshoe. If they are able to buy back only some of the shares at or below the offer price (because the stock eventually rises higher than the offer price), then the underwriters would exercise a portion of the greenshoe to cover their remaining short position. If the underwriters were not able to buy back any portion of the oversold shares at or below the offering price ("syndicate bid") because the stock immediately rose and stayed up, then they would completely cover their 15% short position by exercising 100% of the shoe.

=== SEC regulations ===
The SEC permits the underwriters to engage in naked short sales of the offering. The underwriters create a naked short position either by selling short more shares than the amount stated in the greenshoe, or by selling short shares where there is no greenshoe. It is theoretically possible for the underwriters to naked short sell a large percentage of the offering. The SEC also permits the underwriting syndicate to place stabilizing bids on the stock in the aftermarket. However, underwriters of initial and follow-on offerings in the United States rarely use stabilizing bids to stabilize new issues. Instead, they engage in short selling the offering and purchasing in the aftermarket to stabilize new offerings. "Recently, the SEC staff has learned that in the US, syndicate covering transactions have replaced (in terms of frequency of use) stabilization as a means to support post-offering market prices. Syndicate covering transactions may be preferred by managing underwriters primarily because they are not subject to the price and other conditions that apply to stabilization."

=== Naked short selling and syndicate covering purchases ===
The only pathway the underwriting syndicate has for closing a naked short position is to purchase shares in the aftermarket. Unlike shares sold short related to the greenshoe, the underwriting syndicate risks losing money by engaging in naked short sales. If the offering is popular and the price rises above the original offering price, the syndicate may have no choice but to close a naked short position by purchasing shares in the aftermarket at a price higher than that for which they had sold the shares. On the other hand, if the price of the offering falls below the original offer price, a naked short position gives the syndicate greater power to exert upward pressure on the issue than the greenshoe alone, and this position then becomes profitable to the underwriting syndicate.

=== Risk to investors ===
The underwriters' ability to stabilize a stock's price is finite both in terms of the number of shares the underwriters short-sold, and the length of time over which they choose to close their positions. "Regulation M defines this type of share repurchase as a syndicate covering transaction and imposes the same disclosure requirements as those imposed on penalty bids. Consequently, investors need not be informed that an offering is, or will be, stabilized by way of a syndicate short position. Rather, investors need only be exposed to language indicating that 'the underwriter may effect stabilizing transactions in connection with an offering of securities' and a characterization of possible stabilization practices in the 'plan of distribution' section of the prospectus."

The SEC currently does not require that underwriters publicly report their short positions or short-covering transactions. Investors who are unaware of underwriter stabilizing activity, or who choose to invest in what they perceive to be a stable issue can encounter volatility when the underwriters pause or complete any stabilizing activity. "Cast in the most negative light, price stabilization might be seen as a means of transferring risk to a relatively naïve segment of the investor population."

== Reverse greenshoe ==
A reverse greenshoe is a special provision in an IPO prospectus, which allows underwriters to sell shares back to the issuer.

A reverse greenshoe is used to support the share price in the event that the share price falls in the post-IPO aftermarket. In this case, the underwriter buys shares in the open market and then sells them back to the issuer, stabilizing the share price.

In certain circumstances, a reverse greenshoe can be a more practical form of price stabilization than the traditional method.

The Facebook IPO in 2012 is an example of a reverse greenshoe.

=== How a regular greenshoe works ===
- The regular greenshoe is a physically settled offset given to the underwriter by the issuer.
- The underwriter has sold 115% of shares and thus is 15% short.
- The IPO price is set at $10 per share.
- If it falls to $8, the underwriter does not exercise the shoe, instead it buys the shares at $8 in the market to cover his short position at $10. Buying a large block of shares stabilizes the price. The underwriter makes $2.
- If the price rises to $12, the underwriter exercises the shoe, buying shares from the issuer at $10 (minus the underwriting discount) and closing out his short position.

=== How a reverse greenshoe works ===
- The reverse greenshoe is for a given amount of shares (15% of the issued amount, for example) held by the underwriter "against" the issuer (if a primary offering) or against the majority shareholder/s (if a secondary offering).
- The underwriter sells 100% of the issued stock.
- The IPO price is set at $10 per share.
- If it falls to $8, the underwriter purchases X number of shares in the market and then exercises the greenshoe, buying the shares at $8 in the market and selling back to the issuer at $10. Buying a large block of shares stabilizes the price, gaining $2 per share.
- If the price rises to $12, the underwriter neither purchases stock nor exercises the shoe.
