= BIY (disambiguation) =

BIY is the code for the Bingley railway station in West Yorkshire, England.

Biy may also refer to:

- biy, historically, an elected judge and administrator in Kazakhstan
- biy, the ISO 639 code for the Birhor language, a Munda language of India
- An initialism for Baba Is You, the puzzle video game

== See also ==
- BYI (disambiguation)
- BII (disambiguation)
- Bi (disambiguation)
- Bié (disambiguation)
- Buy (disambiguation)
- By (disambiguation)
