= Okino-Klyuchi =

Okino-Klyuchi Окино-Ключи
- Selo
- Location within Republic of Buryatia Location within Russia
- Coordinates: 50°35′N 107°06′E
- Country: Russia
- Region: Republic of Buryatia
- District: Bichursky District
- Time zone: UTC+8:00

Okino-Klyuchi (Russian: Окино-Ключи; Buryat: Охин Булаг, Okhin Bulag) is a rural locality (a selo) in Bichursky District, Republic of Buryatia, Russia. The population was 1,066 as of 2010. There are eight streets.

== Geography ==
Okino-Klyuchi is located 37 km west of Bichura (the district's administrative centre) by road. Starye Klyuchi is the nearest rural locality.
