= Sakharny Zavod =

Sakharny Zavod Сахарный Завод
- Settlement
- Location within Republic of Buryatia Location within Russia
- Coordinates: 50°37′N 107°31′E
- Country: Russia
- Region: Republic of Buryatia
- District: Bichursky District
- Time zone: UTC+8:00

Sakharny Zavod (Russian: Сахарный Завод) is a rural locality (a settlement) in Bichursky District, Republic of Buryatia, Russia. The population was 854 as of 2010. There are 8 streets.

== Geography ==
Sakharny Zavod is located 8 km northwest of Bichura (the district's administrative centre) by road. Bichura is the nearest rural locality.
