= Maly Kunaley =

Maly Kunaley Малый Куналей
- Selo
- Location within Republic of Buryatia Location within Russia
- Coordinates: 50°36′N 107°49′E
- Country: Russia
- Region: Republic of Buryatia
- District: Bichursky District
- Time zone: UTC+8:00

Maly Kunaley (Russian: Малый Куналей; Buryat: Бага Хунилаа, Baga Khunilaa) is a rural locality (a selo) and the administrative centre of Malokunaleyskoye Rural Settlement, Bichursky District, Republic of Buryatia, Russia. The population was 1,186 as of 2017. There are 19 streets.

== Geography ==
Maly Kunaley is located 20 km east of Bichura (the district's administrative centre) by road. Poselye is the nearest rural locality.
