= Motnya =

Motnya Мотня
- Selo
- Location within Republic of Buryatia Location within Russia
- Coordinates: 50°40′N 107°43′E
- Country: Russia
- Region: Republic of Buryatia
- District: Bichursky District
- Time zone: UTC+8:00

Motnya (Russian: Мотня) is a rural locality (a selo) in Bichursky District, Republic of Buryatia, Russia. as As of 2010, the population was 239. There are 2 streets.

== Geography ==
Motnya is located 24 km northeast of Bichura (the district's administrative centre) by road. Novosretenka is the nearest rural locality.
