= Ust-Zagan =

Ust-Zagan Усть-Заган
- Selo
- Location within Republic of Buryatia Location within Russia
- Coordinates: 50°41′N 107°55′E
- Country: Russia
- Region: Republic of Buryatia
- District: Bichursky District
- Time zone: UTC+8:00

Ust-Zagan (Russian: Усть-Заган) is a rural locality (a selo) in Bichursky District, Republic of Buryatia, Russia. The population was 32 as of 2010. There is 1 street.

== Geography ==
Ust-Zagan is located 34 km northeast of Bichura (the district's administrative centre) by road. Uzky Lug is the nearest rural locality.
