= Ara-Kiret =

Ara-Kiret Ара-Киреть
- Selo
- Location within Republic of Buryatia Location within Russia
- Coordinates: 50°35′N 107°25′E
- Country: Russia
- Region: Republic of Buryatia
- District: Bichursky District
- Time zone: UTC+8:00

Ara-Kiret (Russian: Ара-Киреть; Buryat: Ара Хэрээтэ, Ara Khereete) is a rural locality (a selo) in Bichursky District, Republic of Buryatia, Russia. The population was 363 as of 2010. There are 2 streets.

== Geography ==
Ara-Kiret is located 14 km west of Bichura (the district's administrative centre) by road. Dunda-Kiret is the nearest rural locality.
