= Khonkholoy =

Khonkholoy Хонхолой
- Selo
- Location within Republic of Buryatia Location within Russia
- Coordinates: 50°52′N 108°15′E
- Country: Russia
- Region: Republic of Buryatia
- District: Bichursky District
- Time zone: UTC+8:00

Khonkholoy (Russian: Хонхолой; Buryat: Хонхоло, Khonkholo) is a rural locality (a selo) and the administrative centre of Khonkholoyskoye Rural Settlement, Bichursky District, Republic of Buryatia, Russia. The population was 377 as of 2017.

== Geography ==
Khonkholoy is located 115 km northeast of Bichura (the district's administrative centre) by road. Nikolsk is the nearest rural locality.
