= Bichura (archaeological site) =

The Bichura archaeological site
- Поселение Бичура (Russian)
- Interactive map of The Bichura archaeological site
- 50°38′56″N 107°35′44″E
- Periods: 10th–7th centuries BCE
- Location: Russia, Republic of Buryatia, Bichursky District

Bichura is an archaeological site located in the Bichursky District of the Republic of Buryatia. According to archaeologists L. V. Lbova and E. R. Grechishchev, it represents a settlement of the Slab Grave culture. The site is dated to the late stage of the Bronze Age (7th–10th centuries BCE).

The settlement was discovered in 1971 by an archaeological expedition of the Chita State Pedagogical Institute under the direction of archaeologist M. V. Konstantinov.

In the 1990s, the site was studied by archaeologist L. V. Lbova, who conducted rescue excavations in connection with quarry development near the settlement.

The collection of finds includes stone tools, ceramic fragments, and metal artifacts.

== The Site ==
=== Location and Dating ===
The Bichura archaeological site is located northeast of the village of Bichura in the Bichursky District of the Republic of Buryatia, on the left bank of the Khilok River, in the locality known as Kholodny Klyuch.

Archaeologist P. B. Konovalov dates the archaeological site to the 2nd–1st millennia BCE. L. V. Lbova and E. R. Grechishchev attribute the archaeological site to the Late Bronze Age, dating it to the 10th–7th centuries BCE.

== Research History ==
The archaeological site was discovered in 1971 by an archaeological expedition of the Chita State Pedagogical Institute, headed by archaeologist M. V. Konstantinov.

In 1973, the expedition conducted surface collection of finds and cleaning (Note: Cleaning (in archaeology) — the removal of thin layers of soil using shovels or knives in order to reveal material remains, such as dwelling remains, pits, graves, hearths, etc.)of exposed sections at the archaeological site. The cultural layer was identified at a depth of 0.6–0.8 m.

Preliminarily, M. V. Konstantinov identified the archaeological site as multi-layered and dated it to a period ranging from the Mesolithic–Early Neolithic to the Metal Age. The assemblage comprised 351 stone artifacts and 131 ceramic fragments. The lithic collection included scrapers and micro-scrapers, chisel-like tools, a transverse burin, (Note: Transverse burin (or cross burin) — a tool bearing a burin spall removed transversely to the longitudinal axis of the implement.) pestles, sinkers, hammerstones, (Note: Hammerstone (in archaeology) — a tool made of stone, bone, antler, or wood, used to deliver flaking (detaching) blows.) and arrowheads.

In 1987, during the collection of surface finds at the site, archaeologist L. V. Lbova recorded that the archaeological site was in an emergency condition. She noted the destruction of the cultural layer caused by quarry development near the site. As a result of the 1987 investigations, ceramic fragments dating to the Bronze Age and the Early Iron Age were discovered, and stone tools were also documented. According to L. V. Lbova and E. R. Grechishchev, from a cultural and chronological perspective, the archaeological site was identified as a settlement of the Slab Grave culture. The multi-layered nature of the site was not confirmed, which, in their view, may indicate either the destruction of cultural layers due to quarry activity or the premature conclusions of M. V. Konstantinov regarding the site's multi-layered character, based on his research in the 1970s.

In 1990–1991, rescue excavations covering an area of 65 m² were carried out at the archaeological site by an expedition of the Buryat Institute of Social Sciences of the Siberian Branch of the USSR Academy of Sciences under the direction of archaeologist L. V. Lbova.

The researchers established that the cultural layer was located within a stratigraphic unit dated to the final phase of the Subboreal period, within the interval of 3.3–2.8 thousand years BP. Artifacts recovered during the rescue excavations of the 1990s included ceramic fragments, stone tools, and bronze fragments and objects. During the excavations, skeletal remains belonging to an adolescent were also discovered. The remains were found on a hearth lens. The deceased lay face down with the legs bent backward. No grave goods were identified. No evidence indicating that this was an intentional burial was found.

The Bichura archaeological site is protected by the state in accordance with Resolution No. 242 of the Government of the Republic of Buryatia dated 9 July 1996, as an archaeological monument.

== Finds ==
The collection of stone artifacts includes two microcores, two micro-scrapers, 25 flakes, six blades, (Note: Blade (in archaeology) — a flake whose length is at least twice its width and which has parallel edges.) one of which bears retouch, (Note: Retouch — a secondary working technique involving the modification of a blank’s edge by applying a series of small flake removals through percussion or pressure flaking.) and 32 fragments and splinters. The surface finds comprise three single-platform (Note: Single-platform tool — an implement from which flaking was carried out from a single platform.) microblades, one double-platform microcore, a sinker, a pestle, flakes, and blades. The tool assemblage includes knife-like implements, discoid micro-scrapers, medial borers, (Note: Medial borer — a tool with an elongated perforating tip shaped by retouch, with the point symmetrically positioned relative to the longitudinal axis of the blank.) and end scrapers. (Note: End scraper (or simple single scraper) — a scraper with a single working edge located at the distal end of the implement.)

Ceramic artifacts from the archaeological site are divided by the researchers into two groups, distinguished by manufacturing technique and ornamentation on the fragments. The first group consists of thin-walled vessels of simple and complex forms; the second group includes thick-walled vessels of simple and complex forms with flat bases and tripod supports. All ceramics were made of red ferruginous clay containing mica inclusions. Sand, organic material, and grog were used as temper in the clay preparation.

Similar to finds from the Nizhneberezovskaya and Shevinskaya sites, the ceramic fragments are dated to the Karasuk culture.

Metal artifacts are represented by fragments of a knife and a quadrangular-in-cross-section bronze needle, a flat bronze button with a loop, and a bronze plaque with a perforation. A fragment of bronze of indeterminate shape, metal shavings, a piece of lead, and one glass-paste bead were also found.

The osteological material consists of fragments of broken and burnt bone. Among these, bones belonging to roe deer and horse were identified.
