= Buijs =

Buijs is a Dutch surname. People with the surname Buijs include:

- Anne Buijs (born 1991), Dutch volleyball player
- Catharina Buijs (1714–1781), Dutch cartographer, publisher
- Danny Buijs (born 1982), Dutch footballer
- Jan Buijs (1889–1961), Dutch architect
- Jordy Buijs (born 1988), Dutch footballer

== As part of a compound surname ==
- Wobine Buijs-Glaudemans (born 1960), Dutch politician

== See also ==
- Buys
