= Dunda-Kiret =

Dunda-Kiret Дунда-Киреть
- Ulus
- Location within Republic of Buryatia Location within Russia
- Coordinates: 50°35′N 107°27′E
- Country: Russia
- Region: Republic of Buryatia
- District: Bichursky District

Population (2010)
  - Total: 372
- Time zone: UTC+8:00

Dunda-Kiret (Russian: Дунда-Киреть; Buryat: Дунда Хэрээтэ, Dunda Khereete) is a rural locality (an ulus) in Bichursky District, Republic of Buryatia, Russia. The population was 372 as of 2010. There are 5 streets.

== Geography ==
Dunda-Kiret is located 12 km (7.5 mi) west of Bichura (the district's administrative centre) by road. Ara-Kiret is the nearest rural locality.
