= Uzky Lug =

Uzky Lug Узкий Луг
- Selo
- Location within Republic of Buryatia Location within Russia
- Coordinates: 50°41′N 108°01′E
- Country: Russia
- Region: Republic of Buryatia
- District: Bichursky District
- Time zone: UTC+8:00

Uzky Lug (Russian: Узкий Луг) is a rural locality (a selo) in Bichursky District, Republic of Buryatia, Russia. The population was 482 as of 2010. There are 7 streets.

== Geography ==
Uzky Lug is located 41 km northeast of Bichura (the district's administrative centre) by road. Buy is the nearest rural locality.
