= Verkhny Mangirtuy =

Verkhny Mangirtuy Верхний Мангиртуй
- Selo
- Location within Republic of Buryatia Location within Russia
- Coordinates: 50°40′N 107°14′E
- Country: Russia
- Region: Republic of Buryatia
- District: Bichursky District
- Time zone: UTC+8:00

Verkhny Mangirtuy (Russian: Верхний Мангиртуй; Buryat: Дээдэ Мангирта, Deede Mangirta) is a rural locality (a selo) in Bichursky District, Republic of Buryatia, Russia. The population was 418 as of 2010. There are 10 streets.

== Geography ==
Verkhny Mangirtuy is located 33 km northwest of Bichura (the district's administrative centre) by road. Nizhny Mangirtuy is the nearest rural locality.
