= Topka =

Topka Топка
- Selo
- Location within Republic of Buryatia Location within Russia
- Coordinates: 50°28′N 107°04′E
- Country: Russia
- Region: Republic of Buryatia
- District: Bichursky District
- Time zone: UTC+8:00

Topka (Russian: Топка) is a rural locality (a selo) in Bichursky District, Republic of Buryatia, Russia. The population was 483 in 2010. There are four streets.

== Geography ==
Topka is located 54 km southwest of Bichura (the district's administrative centre) by road. Okino-Klyuchi is the nearest rural locality.
