= Amagalantuy =

Amagalantuy Амагалантуй
- Ulus
- Location within Republic of Buryatia Location within Russia
- Coordinates: 50°49′N 108°03′E
- Country: Russia
- Region: Republic of Buryatia
- District: Bichursky District
- Time zone: UTC+8:00

Amagalantuy (Russian: Амагалантуй; Buryat: Амгаланта, Amgalanta) is a rural locality (an ulus) in Bichursky District, Republic of Buryatia, Russia. The population was 45 in 2010. There are two streets.

== Geography ==
Amagalantuy is located 56 km northeast of Bichura (the district's administrative centre) by road. Shanaga is the nearest rural locality.
