= Bouy (disambiguation) =

Bouy or variant, may refer to:

== Places ==
- Bouy, Marne, France; a commune
- Bouy-sur-Orvin (Bouy-upon-Orvin), Aube, France; a commune
- Bouy (town), Kostroma Oblast, Russia

== People ==
- Gaston Bouy (1866–1943) French artist
- Ouasim Bouy (born 1993) Dutch soccer player
- André Bouys (1656–1740) French artist

== Other uses ==
- "bouy" is a common misspelling in English, see commonly misspelled English words

== See also ==
- Soisy-Bouy, Seine-et-Marne, France; a commune
- Bouy-Luxembourg, Aube, France; a commune
- Berry-Bouy, Cher, France; a commune
- Boy (disambiguation)
- Buy (disambiguation)
- Buoy (disambiguation)
- Buoy
