= Shanaga =

Shanaga Шанага
- Ulus
- Location within Republic of Buryatia Location within Russia
- Coordinates: 50°49′N 108°08′E
- Country: Russia
- Region: Republic of Buryatia
- District: Bichursky District
- Time zone: UTC+8:00

Shanaga (Russian: Шанага) is a rural locality (an ulus) in Bichursky District, Republic of Buryatia, Russia. The population was 455 as of 2010. There are 3 streets.

== Geography ==
Shanaga is located 61 km northeast of Bichura (the district's administrative centre) by road. Potanino is the nearest rural locality.
