= Follow-on offering =

Type of public offering of stock

A follow-on offering, also known as a follow-on public offering (FPO), is a type of public offering of stock that occurs subsequent to the company's initial public offering (IPO).

A follow-on offering can be categorised as dilutive or non-dilutive. In the case of the dilutive offering, the company's board of directors agrees to increase the share float for the purpose of selling more equity in the company. This new inflow of cash might be used to pay off some debt or used for needed company expansion. When new shares are created and then sold by the company, the number of shares outstanding increases and this causes dilution of the earnings per share. Usually the gain of cash inflow from the sale is strategic and is considered positive for the longer-term goals of the company and its shareholders. Some owners of the stock however may not view the event as favorably over a more short term valuation horizon.

One example of a type of follow-on offering is an at-the-market offering (ATM offering), which is sometimes called a controlled equity distribution. In an ATM offering, exchange-listed companies incrementally sell newly issued shares into the secondary trading market through a designated broker-dealer at prevailing market prices. The issuing company is able to raise capital on an as-needed basis with the option to refrain from offering shares if unsatisfied with the available price on a particular day.

The non-dilutive type of follow-on offering is when privately held shares are offered for sale by company directors or other insiders (such as venture capitalists) who may be looking to diversify their holdings. Because no new shares are created, the offering is not dilutive to existing shareholders, but the proceeds from the sale do not benefit the company in any way. Usually however, the increase in available shares allows more institutions to take non-trivial positions in the company. A non-dilutive offering is therefore a type of a secondary market offering.

As with an IPO, the investment banks who are serving as underwriters of the follow-on offering will often be offered the use of a greenshoe or over-allotment option by the selling company.

== See also ==
- Initial public offering
- Rights issue
- Seasoned equity offering
- Public Offering Glossary
