= Harvest =

Process of gathering mature crops from fields

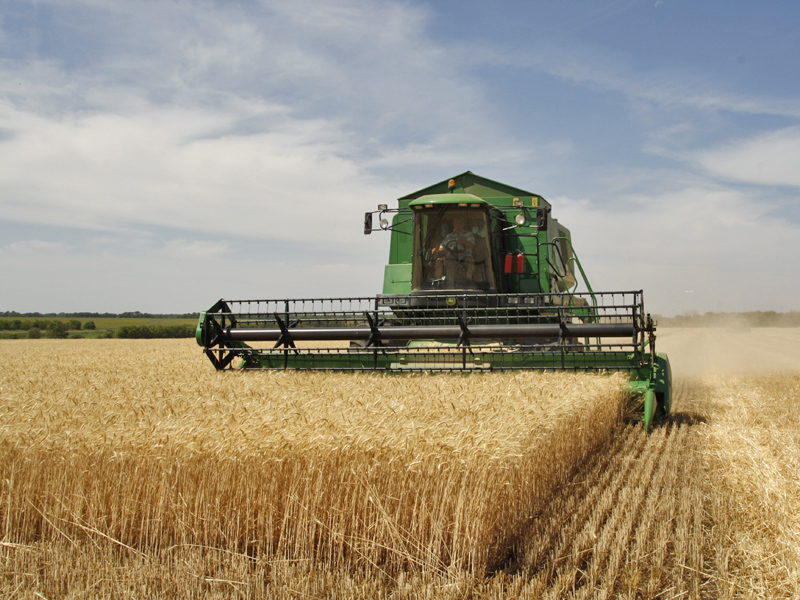
Harvesting in Volgograd Oblast, State farm

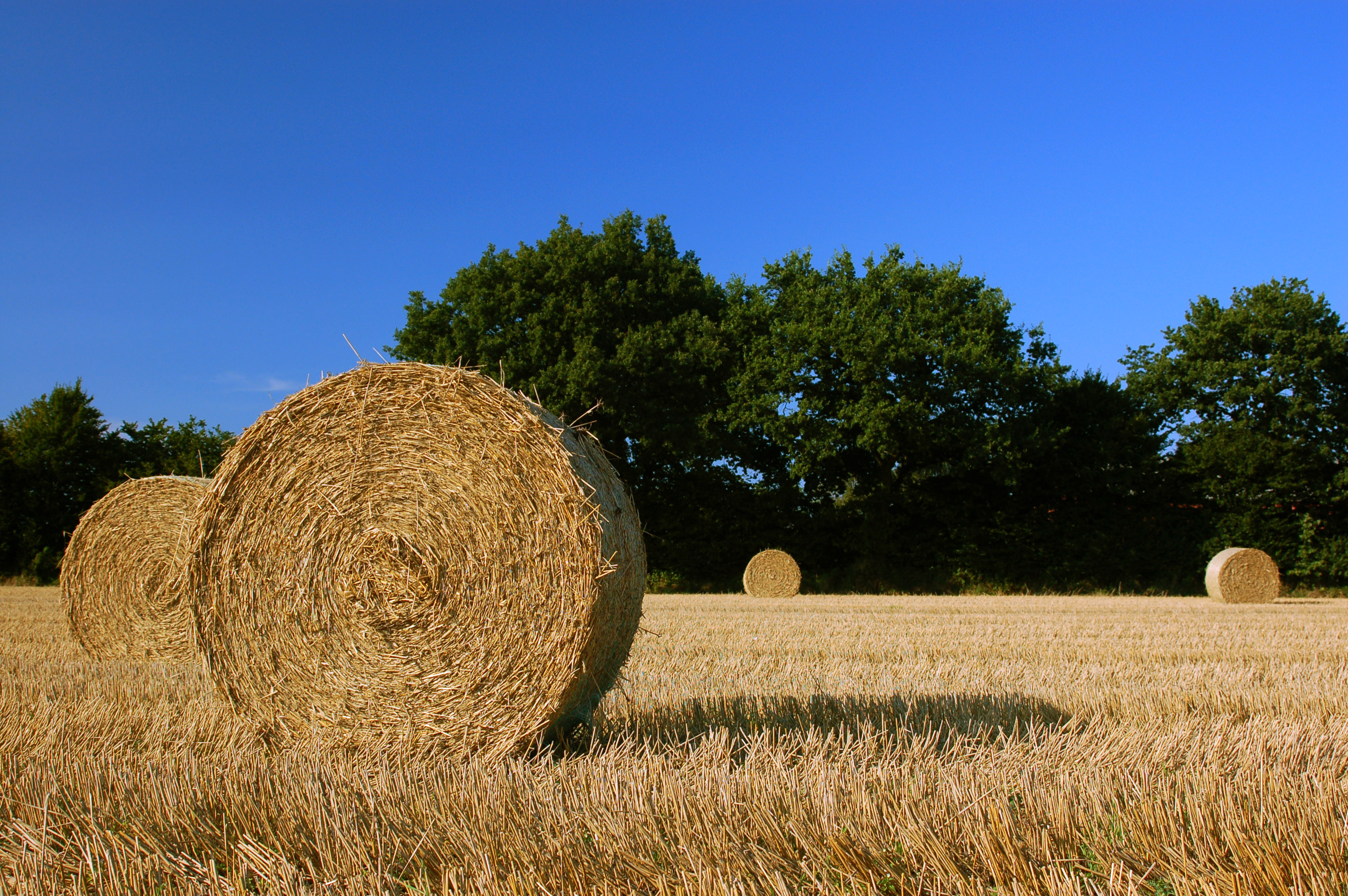
Straw in a field in Schleswig-Holstein, Germany.

Harvesting is the process of collecting plants, animals, or fish (as well as fungi) as food, especially the process of gathering mature crops, and "the harvest" also refers to the collected crops. Reaping is the cutting of grain or pulses for harvest, typically using a scythe, sickle, or reaper. On smaller farms with minimal mechanization, harvesting is the most labor-intensive activity of the growing season. On large mechanized farms, harvesting uses farm machinery, such as the combine harvester. Automation has increased the efficiency of both the seeding and harvesting processes. Specialized harvesting equipment, using conveyor belts for gentle gripping and mass transport, replaces the manual task of removing each seedling by hand. The term "harvesting" in general usage may include immediate postharvest handling, including cleaning, sorting, packing, and cooling.

The completion of harvesting marks the end of the growing season, or the growing cycle for a particular crop, and the social importance of this event makes it the focus of seasonal celebrations such as harvest festivals, found in many cultures and religions.

== Etymology ==
"Harvest", a noun, came from the Old English word hærf-est (coined before the Angles moved from Angeln to Britain) meaning "autumn" (the season), "harvest-time", or "August". (It continues to mean "autumn" in British dialect, and "season of gathering crops" generally.) "The harvest" came to also mean the activity of reaping, gathering, and storing grain and other grown products during the autumn season, and also the grain and other grown products themselves. "Harvest" was also verbified: "To harvest" means to reap, gather, and store the harvest (or the crop). People who harvest and equipment that harvests are harvesters; while they do it, they are harvesting.

== Crop failure ==
Total estimated agricultural production losses from disasters (1991–2023).

Crop failure (also known as harvest failure) is an absent or greatly diminished crop yield relative to expectation, caused by the plants being damaged, killed, or destroyed, or affected in some way that they fail to form edible fruit, seeds, or leaves in their expected abundance.

Crop failures can be caused by catastrophic events such as plant disease outbreaks (such as the Great Famine in Ireland), volcanic eruptions (such as the Year Without a Summer), heavy rainfall, storms, floods, or drought, or by slow, cumulative effects of soil degradation, too-high soil salinity, erosion, desertification, usually as results of drainage, overdrafting (for irrigation), overfertilization, or overexploitation.

In history, crop failures and subsequent famines have triggered human migration, rural exodus, etc.

The proliferation of industrial monocultures, with their reduction in crop diversity and dependence on heavy use of artificial fertilizers and pesticides, has led to overexploited soils that are nearly incapable of regeneration. Over the years, unsustainable farming of land degrades soil fertility and diminishes crop yield. With a steadily-increasing world population and local overpopulation, even slightly diminishing yields are already the equivalent to a partial harvest failure. Fertilizers obviate the need for soil regeneration in the first place, and international trade prevents local crop failures from developing into famines.

== Other uses ==
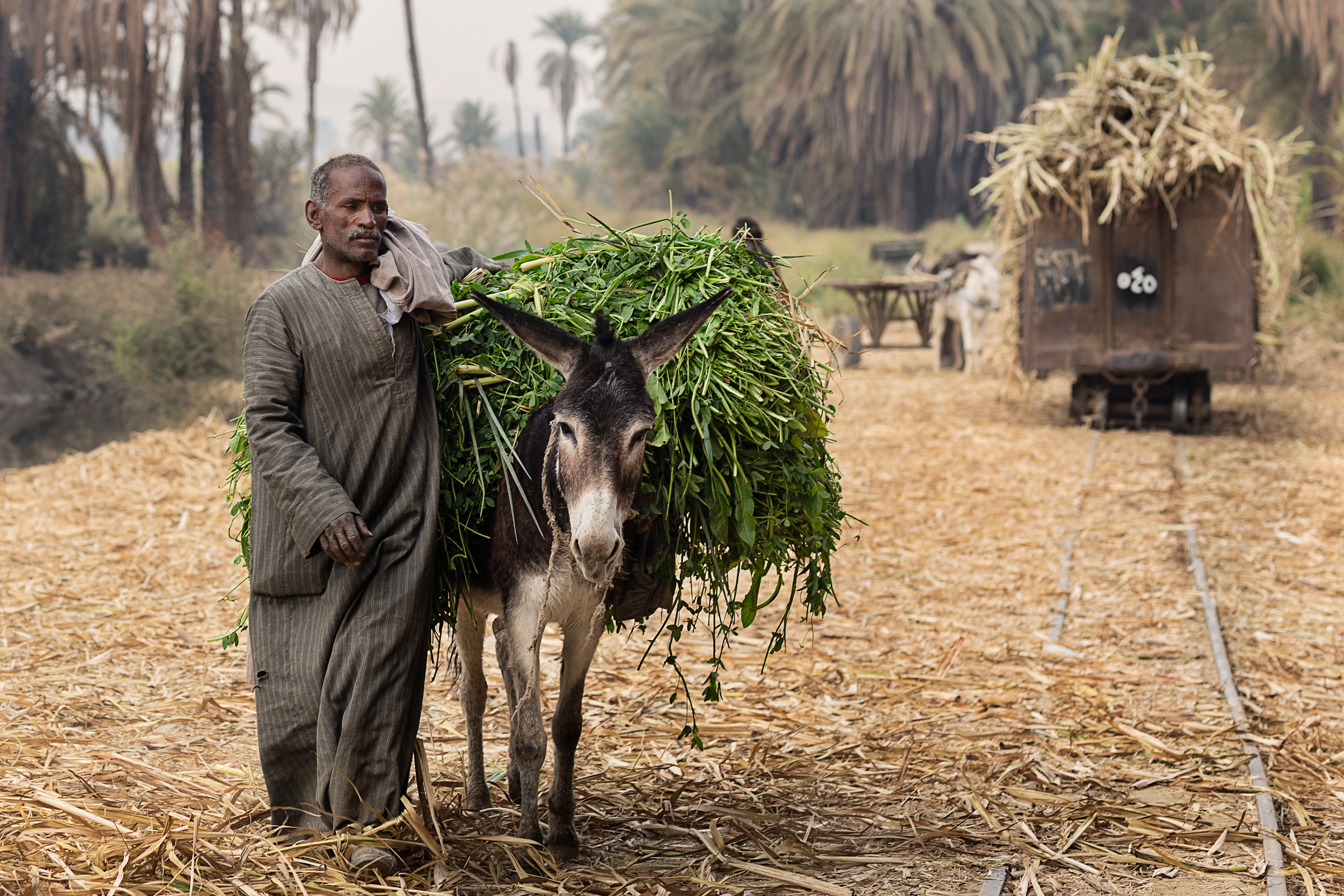
Some people use their own animals for harvesting their crops

Harvesting commonly refers to grain and produce, but also has other uses: fishing and logging are also referred to as harvesting. The term harvest is also used in reference to harvesting grapes for wine. Wild harvesting refers to the collection of plants and other edible supplies which have not been cultivated. Within the context of irrigation, water harvesting refers to the collection and storage of rainwater for agricultural or domestic uses. Instead of harvest, the term exploit is also used, as in exploiting fisheries or water resources. Energy harvesting is the process of capturing and storing energy (such as solar power, thermal energy, wind energy, salinity gradients, and kinetic energy) that would otherwise go unexploited. Body harvesting, or cadaver harvesting, is the process of collecting and preparing cadavers for anatomical study. In a similar sense, organ harvesting is the removal of tissues or organs from a donor for the purposes of transplanting.

In a non-agricultural sense, the word "harvesting" is an economic principle which is known as an exit event or liquidity event. For example, if a person or business was to cash out of an ownership position in a company or eliminate their investment in a product, it is known as a harvest strategy.

=== Canada ===
Harvesting or Domestic Harvesting in Canada refers to hunting, fishing, and plant gathering by First Nations, Métis, and Inuit in discussions of aboriginal or treaty rights. For example, in the Gwich'in Comprehensive Land Claim Agreement, "Harvesting means gathering, hunting, trapping or fishing ...". Similarly, in the Tlicho Land Claim and Self Government Agreement, "'Harvesting' means, in relation to wildlife, hunting, trapping or fishing and, in relation to plants or trees, gathering or cutting."

== Gallery ==
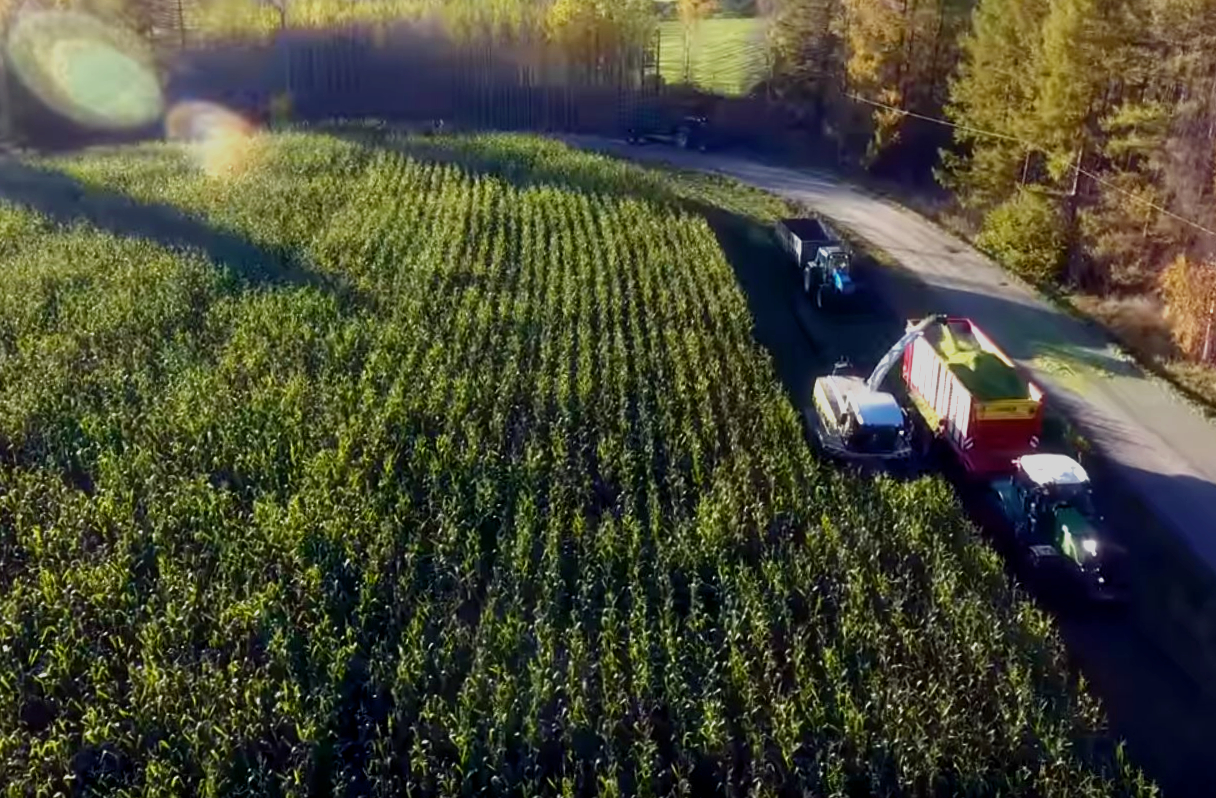
Harvesting maize field in Rantasalmi, South Savo, Finland

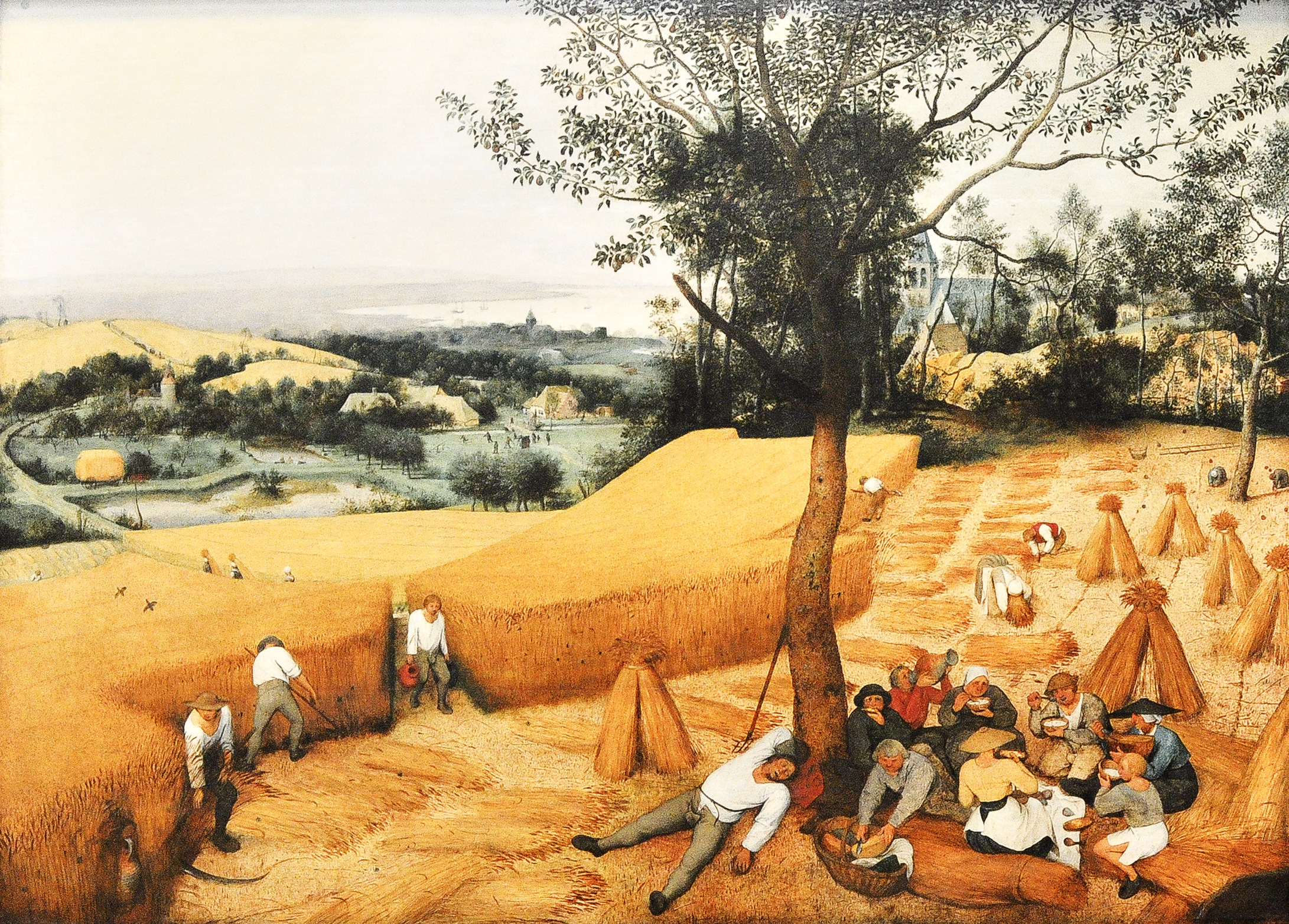
Pieter Bruegel the Elder, The Harvesters, 1565

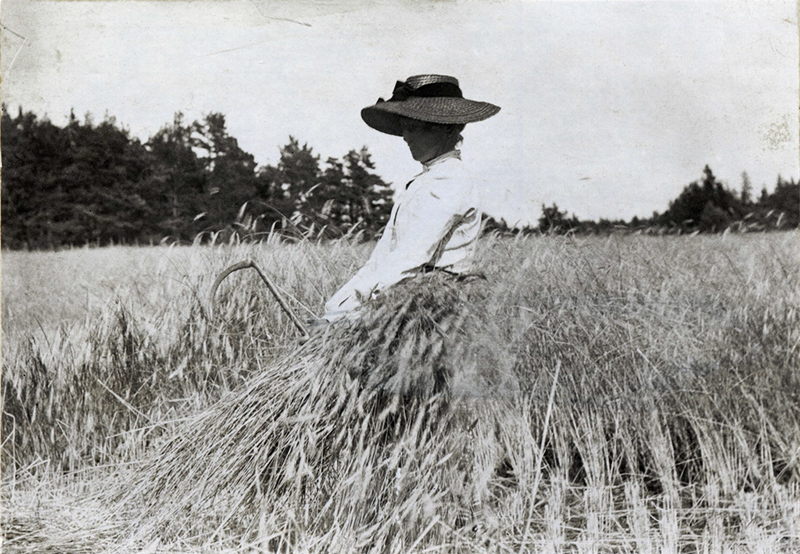
Rye harvest on Gotland, Sweden, 1900–1910.

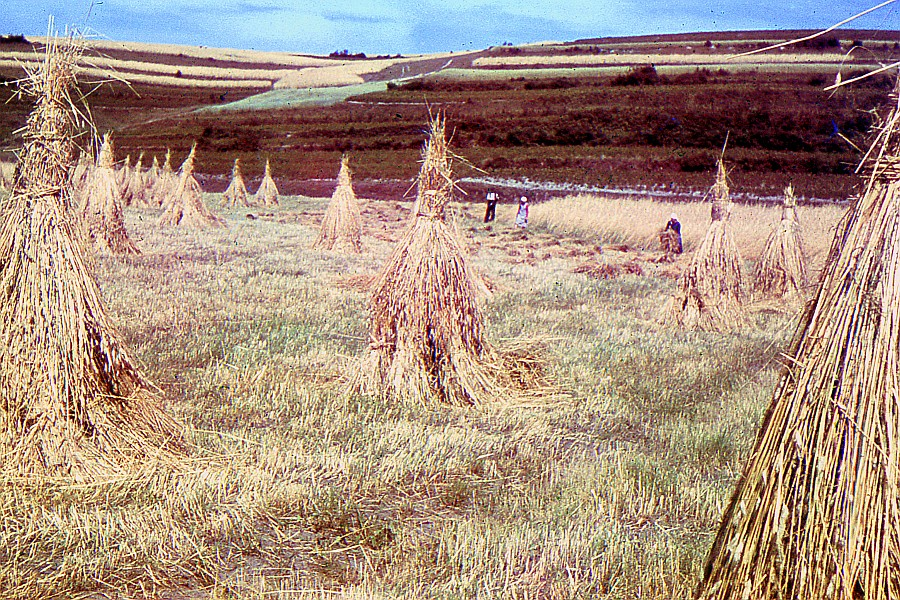
Harvesting in Poland, 1938 (Agfacolor).

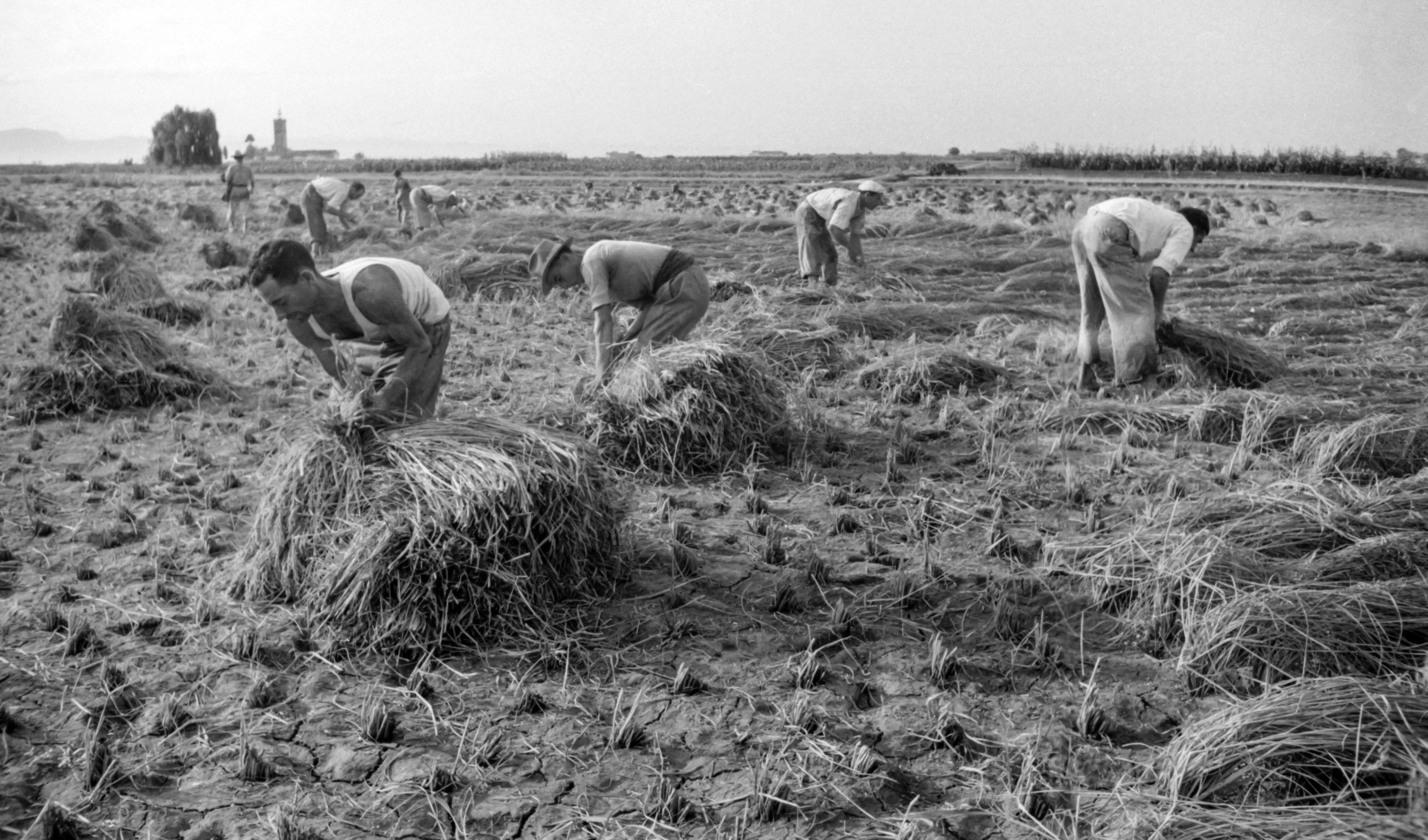
Harvesting rice in Alginet, Land of Valencia, 1953.

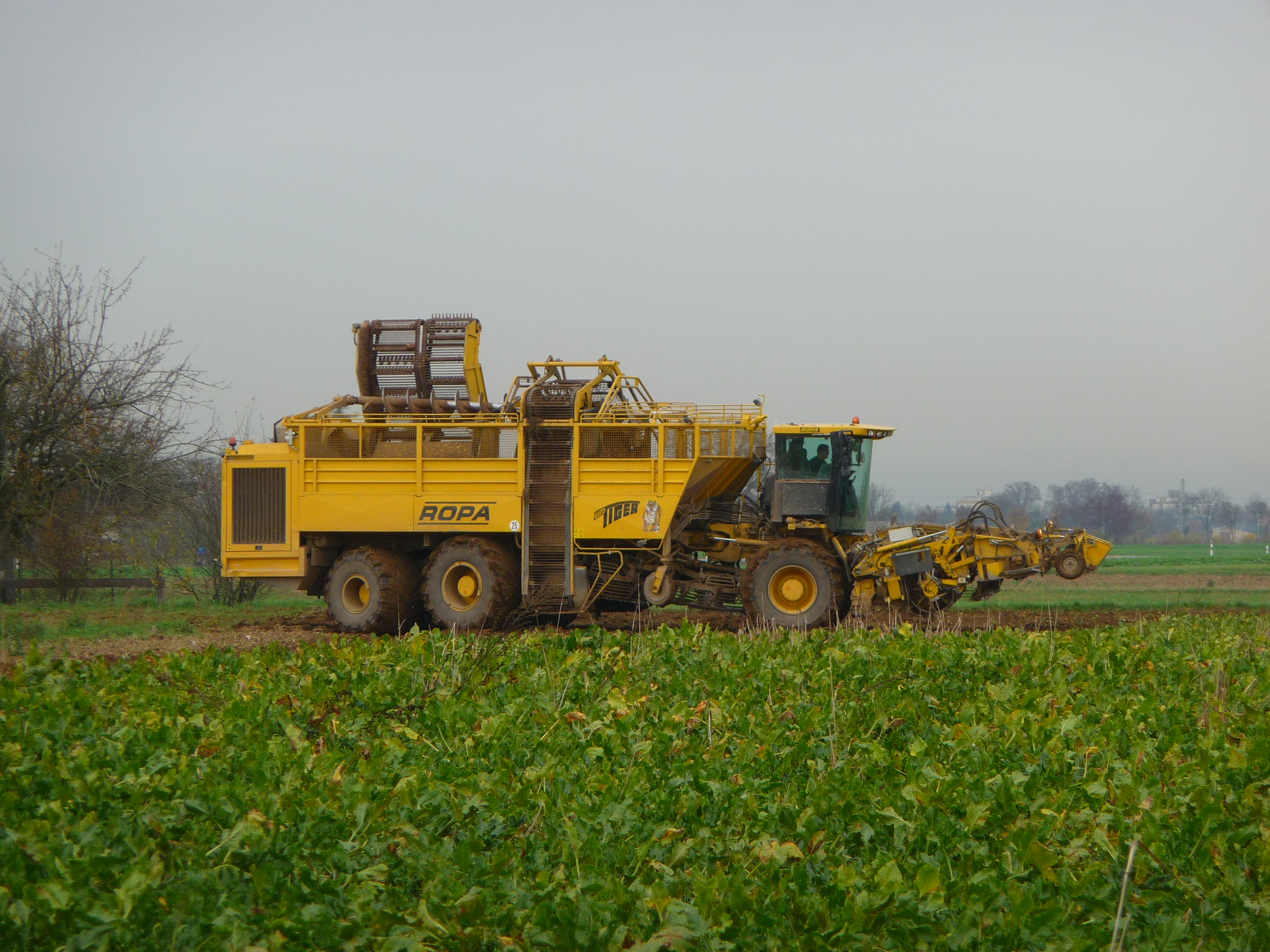
Sugar beet harvester. Baden-Württemberg, Germany.

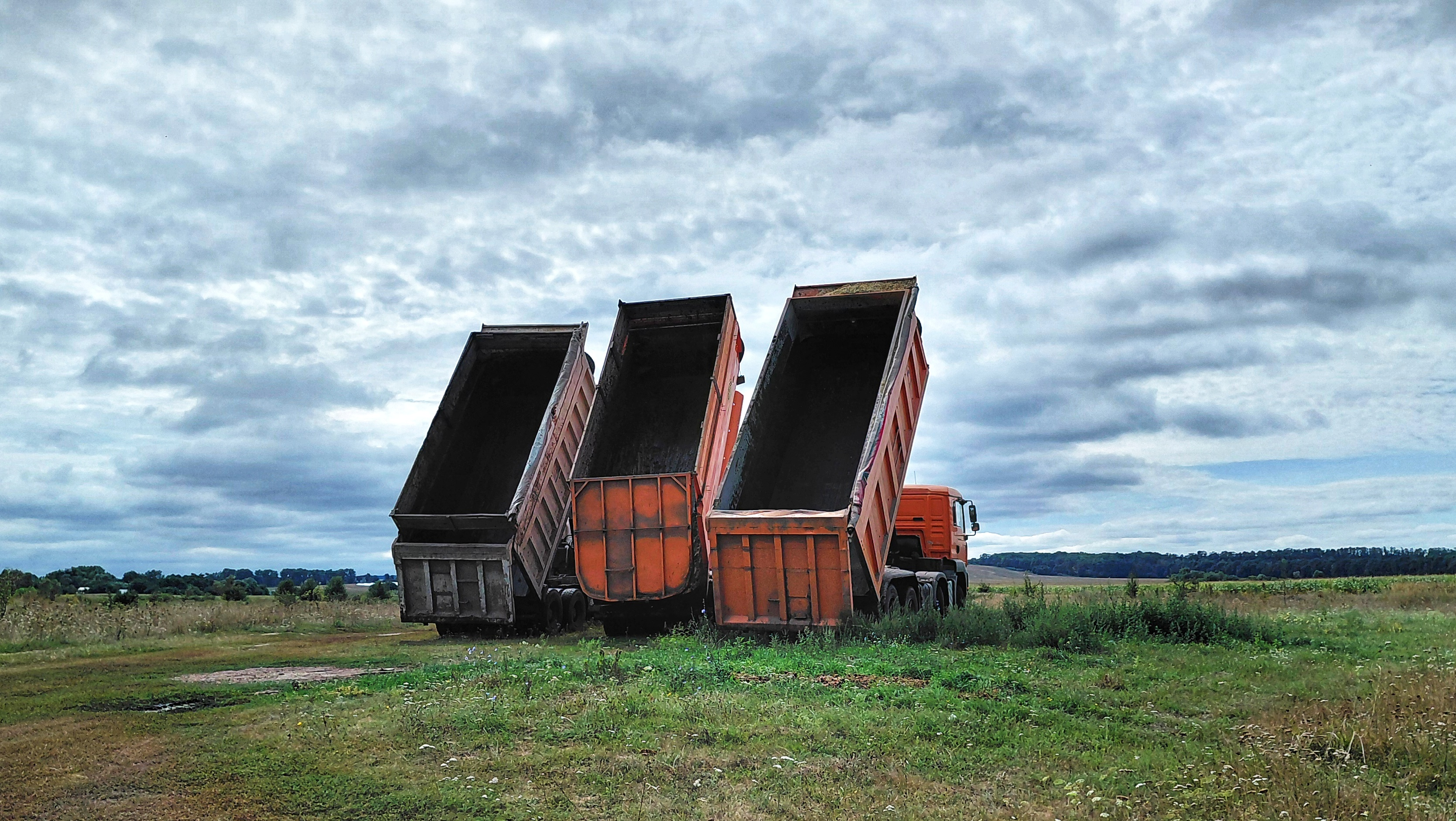
Drying truck beds after rain before harvest.

== See also ==
- Sustainable agriculture
- Sustainable yield
- Threshing
- Topiary
- Winnowing
