= Bui =

Bui may refer to:

- Bank Unique Identifier
- Bui (Cameroon department), an administrative subdivision
- Bùi, a common Vietnamese surname
- Bui Dam, Ghana
- Bui National Park, Ghana
- An enemy character in the anime/manga YuYu Hakusho
- Gianni Bui, Italian footballer

The acronym BUI may refer to:

- Baptist Union of Ireland
- Boating Under the Influence
- Boxing Union of Ireland
- Browser user interface
- Bokondini Airport, Indonesia (IATA code: BUI)
- Biking Under the Influence

== See also ==
- Buy (disambiguation)
- Buj
- Buoy
