= Piz =

Piz or PIZ may refer to:

- Piz Gloria, a mountain-top restaurant in Switzerland
- Piz Buin, a mountain
- Piz Dolf, a mountain
- Piz Segnas, a mountain
- Piz Buin (brand), a suncream brand
- Piz (river), a river in Russia
- Point Lay LRRS Airport (IATA and FAA LID: PIZ), a public and military use airport in Point Lay, Alaska, United States
- Stosh "Piz" Piznarski, a character from Veronica Mars
- PIZ (Compression Method), a compression method built into OpenEXR
