= Mysms =

Cross-platform text messaging service

mysms
- Developer: sms.at mobile internet services gmbh
- Release: 2011; 15 years ago (beta), 2012; 14 years ago
- Written in: Java, JavaScript, Objective-C, C#, C++
- Operating system: Android, iOS, OS X, Windows XP, Windows 7, Windows 8
- Available in: Multilingual
- License: Closed source
- Website: www.mysms.com

mysms is a cross-platform text messaging service, based on Short Message Service (SMS), for smartphones, tablet computers, and laptop and desktop personal computers.

== History ==
mysms is a brand of sms.at, which is a company of Up to Eleven Digital Solutions GmbH, and based in Graz, Austria. Up to Eleven was founded by Martin and Jürgen Pansy. Toto Wolff and Rene Berger belong to its shareholders. The global launch of mysms was in July 2012 and its efforts were initially focused in Germany, Austria and Switzerland. The apps are available for several operating systems, including Android, iOS, Mac OS X, Windows, and web browsers. As of December 2014, mysms for Android phone exhibits 1,000,000–5,000,000 downloads on the Google Play Store.

== Functions ==
mysms synchronizes the existing text messaging history from the smartphone to desktop computers and tablet computers. In contrast to instant messaging services like WhatsApp, mysms focuses on Short Message Service (SMS). Messages can be sent to any mobile phone number, regardless of device type or operating system. Similar to iMessage, users can also send and receive instant messages to other mysms users over the Internet.

== Partnerships and integrations ==
mysms cooperates with other cloud-services like Evernote and implemented Dropbox and Google Drive integrations to allow users to archive their SMS and multimedia messages. The app for Windows 8 is pre-installed on Hewlett-Packard (HP) laptops. Also, the service is offered as white-label product. For this purpose, mysms partnered with the French mobile network operator Bouygues Telecom.

== Open API ==
mysms provides an open application programming interface (API) to other developers that allows them to build their own application based on mysms' core features.

== Achievements ==
In 2012, mysms achieved second place in the Austrian Fast Forward Award. The German magazine Computer Bild mentioned mysms as winner of their messenger test. As of December 22, 2014, the mysms app for Android phone takes the 36th place in the United States in the category Communication in the Google Play Top App Charts.

== See also ==
- Comparison of instant messaging clients
