= Buy, Republic of Buryatia =

Buy Буй
- Selo
- Location within Republic of Buryatia Location within Russia
- Coordinates: 50°38′N 107°58′E
- Country: Russia
- Region: Republic of Buryatia
- District: Bichursky District
- Time zone: UTC+8:00

Buy (Russian: Буй) is a rural locality (a selo) in Bichursky District, Republic of Buryatia, Russia. The population was 659 as of 2010. There are 6 streets.

== Geography ==
Buy is located 34 km east of Bichura (the district's administrative centre) by road. Sloboda is the nearest rural locality.
