= Buoy (disambiguation) =

A buoy is a floating device of many types and uses.

Buoy or buoys may also refer to:

- Buøy, Hundvåg, Stavanger, Rogaland, Norway; an island
  - Buøy IL, a sports club in Buøy, Hundvåg, Stavanger, Rogaland, Norway
- Buoy (horse) (1970–1984), a British thoroughbred racehorse
- Buoy (mascot), the mascot of the Seattle Kraken ice hockey team
- Buoy anti-tank obstacle, a British anti-armoured-vehicle obstacle type named "Buoy"
- Buoys (album), a 2019 album by Panda Bear

== See also ==
- - Buoy tender, a type of boat used to maintain buoys
  - Jolly Buoy Island, Mahatma Gandhi Marine National Park, South Andaman, Andaman Islands, India
- - The Buoys (disambiguation)
- Bouy (disambiguation)
  - Bouy, a commune in northeast France
- Bowie (disambiguation)
- Boy (disambiguation)
- Buy (disambiguation)
