= Buy (inhabited locality) =

Buy (Russian: Буй) is the name of several inhabited localities in Russia.

Urban localities

- Buy, Kostroma Oblast, a town in Kostroma Oblast

Rural localities

- Buy, Republic of Buryatia, a selo in Uzkolugsky Selsoviet of Bichursky District of the Republic of Buryatia
- Buy, Tver Oblast, a village in Toropetsky District of Tver Oblast
