= By =

By or BY may refer to:

== People ==
- By Saam (1914–2000), American sports announcer
- John By (1779–1836), British military engineer famous for his work in Canada

== Places ==
- By, Doubs, France, a commune
- By, Norway, a village
- Bavaria (ISO state code)
- Belarus (ISO country code)
- Burundi (obsolete FIPS Pub 10-4 and NATO digram country codes)
- Bytča District (vehicle registration plate code until 2022)

== Other uses ==
- .by, country-code top-level domain for Belarus
- The attribution (BY) condition of Creative Commons licenses
- Budget year, a synonym for fiscal year
- B-Y, blue-luminance difference in color
- TUI Airways (IATA code: BY), formerly Thomson Airways, Thomsonfly and Britannia Airways

== See also ==
- -by, a common suffix for settlements in northern England
- Bye (disambiguation)
- Buy (disambiguation)
- Bie (disambiguation)
- BI (disambiguation)
