= At-the-market offering =

Type of stock offering

An at-the-market (ATM) offering is a type of follow-on offering of stock utilized by publicly traded companies in order to raise capital over time. In an ATM offering, exchange-listed companies incrementally sell newly issued shares or shares they already own into the secondary trading market through a designated broker-dealer at prevailing market prices. The broker-dealer sells the issuing company's shares in the open market and receives cash proceeds from the transaction. The broker-dealer then delivers the proceeds to the issuing company where the cash can be used for a variety of purposes. A higher stock price means a greater amount of money can be raised. The issuing company is able to raise this kind of capital on an as-needed basis with the option to refrain from offering shares if the available prices on a particular day are unsatisfactory. ATM offerings can be started and stopped at any point, and they can also become more aggressive by selling more shares and raising more money when there is an opportunity in the market or additional need by the issuing company. ATMs can be positioned in advance of an upcoming liquidity event or major milestone to take advantage of increased liquidity and a rising stock price.

== Advantages & Disadvantages ==
ATM financing strategies provide control over the timing and amount of capital raised. This allows companies to raise capital on the terms that they choose, including when and if the ATM is utilised. This allows companies to opportunistically take advantage of increases in the share price and means that companies do not have to time the capital raise perfectly, in effect "averaging in" to their own share price. If successful, it can be a blessing for raising general working capital, funding specific projects, funding R&D, and helping to manage the balance sheet (e.g. paying off debt when needed). Because of the “dribble out” nature of ATM offerings and the uncertainty of how much will be raised (for example if the target minimum price is set too high by the company), they are not as useful for a company in dire need of financing or for a company without an actively traded ticker symbol or imminent news releases.

== History ==
The first ATM offerings were completed in the early 1980s for utilities companies looking to raise capital from time-to-time to meet their financial needs. Since then, at-the-market offerings have been used by large and small capitalization issuers in a wide variety of industries with significant growth occurring after the 2008 financial crisis. Although this financing method has become particularly popular with small-cap life sciences issuers, large-capitalization companies such as Bank of America, Boston Properties and Ford Motor Company have recently employed ATM offerings as well.
