= The Buoys =

The Buoys may refer to:

- The Buoys (American band), a pop rock band
- The Buoys (Australian band), an alternative rock band

== See also ==
- Boys (disambiguation)
- Buoy (disambiguation)
