= Purchase (disambiguation) =

Purchase may refer to:

== People ==
- Blake Purchase (born 2004), American football player
- Jack Purchase (born 1995), Australian basketball player
- Ken Purchase (1939–2016), British politician
- Myles Purchase (born 2002), American football player
- William Purchase (died 1557), one of the Colchester Martyrs
- Zac Purchase (born 1986), British rower
- Louisianna Purchase (drag queen), American drag queen, a contestant on The Boulet Brothers' Dragula season 3

== Places in the United States ==
- Jackson Purchase, a region in western Kentucky; locally called "The Purchase"
- Purchase, New York

== Other uses ==
- Purchase (horse) (1916–1936), American thoroughbred racehorse
- Purchase Records, American small record label started in 2000
- SUNY Purchase, a public college in the State University of New York system
- Purchase, an arrangement of ropes and pulleys to obtain a mechanical advantage

== See also ==
- Buy (disambiguation)
- Purchasing
