= HobbyConsolas =

Spanish video game magazine

- Categories: Computer and video game magazines
- Frequency: Monthly
- Circulation: 32,129 (March 2014)
- Publisher: Axel Springer
- First issue: October 1991
- Company: Hobby Press
- Country: Spain
- Based in: Madrid
- Website: hobbyconsolas.com
- ISSN: 3020-9420

HobbyConsolas is a Spanish video game magazine which was founded in 1991 by Hobby Press and was published by Axel Springer SE. The first issue appeared in October 1991. The monthly magazine offers information about games for all consoles, and since 2012 has also covered video games for PC and mobile devices. In March 2014 it had a circulation of 32,129 copies, and had approximately 330,000 readers. Their official website is the fifth most visited Spanish video game website. It also has a mobile app which helps access people digital magazines on mobile app as well.

Listeners of the Spanish radio program Game 40 named HobbyConsolas the best game magazine of 1997.

== See also ==
- Micromanía
