= Johannes van Keulen =

Dutch cartographer (1654–1715)

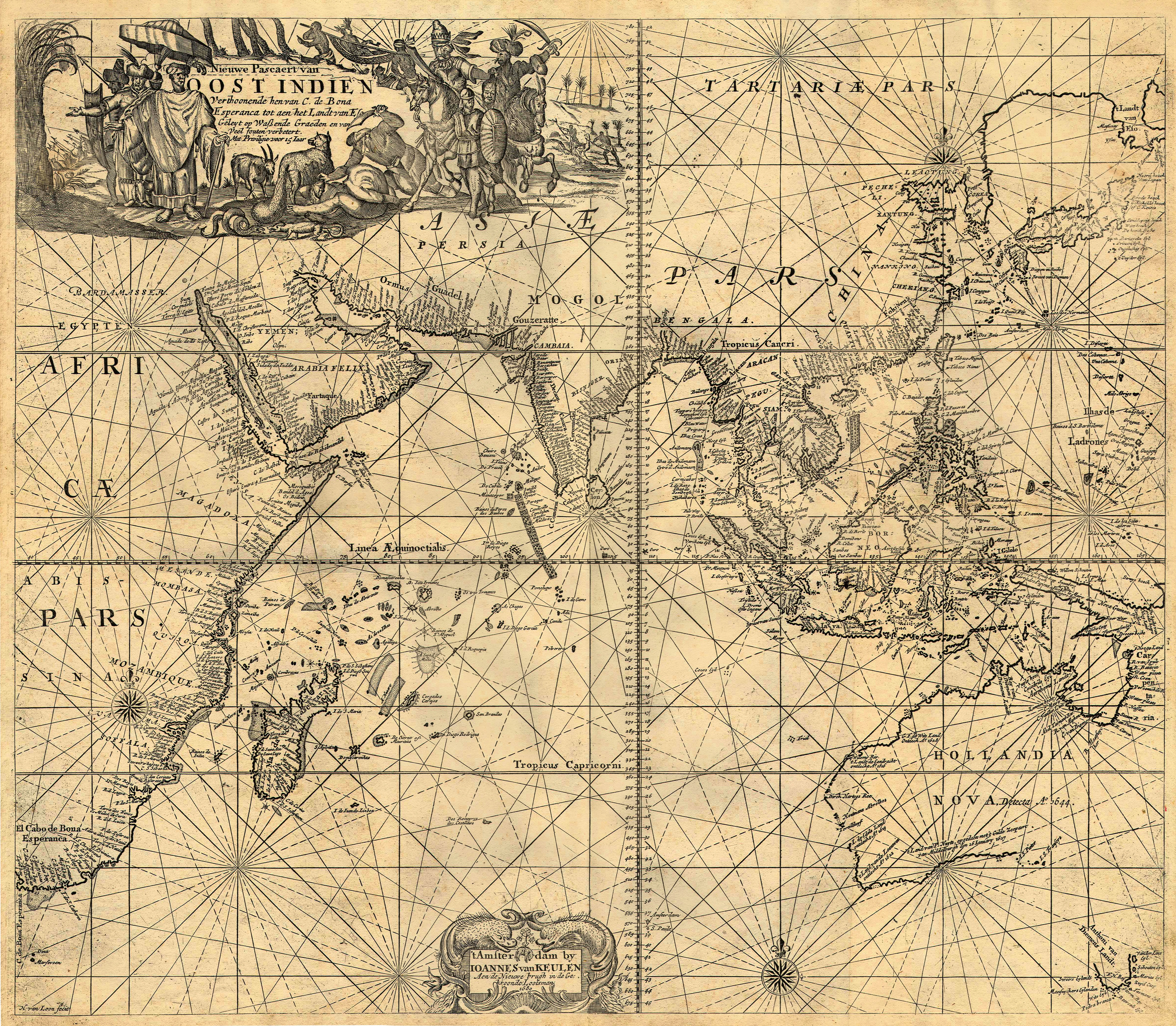
Johannes van Keulen, 1689 map of the East Indies.

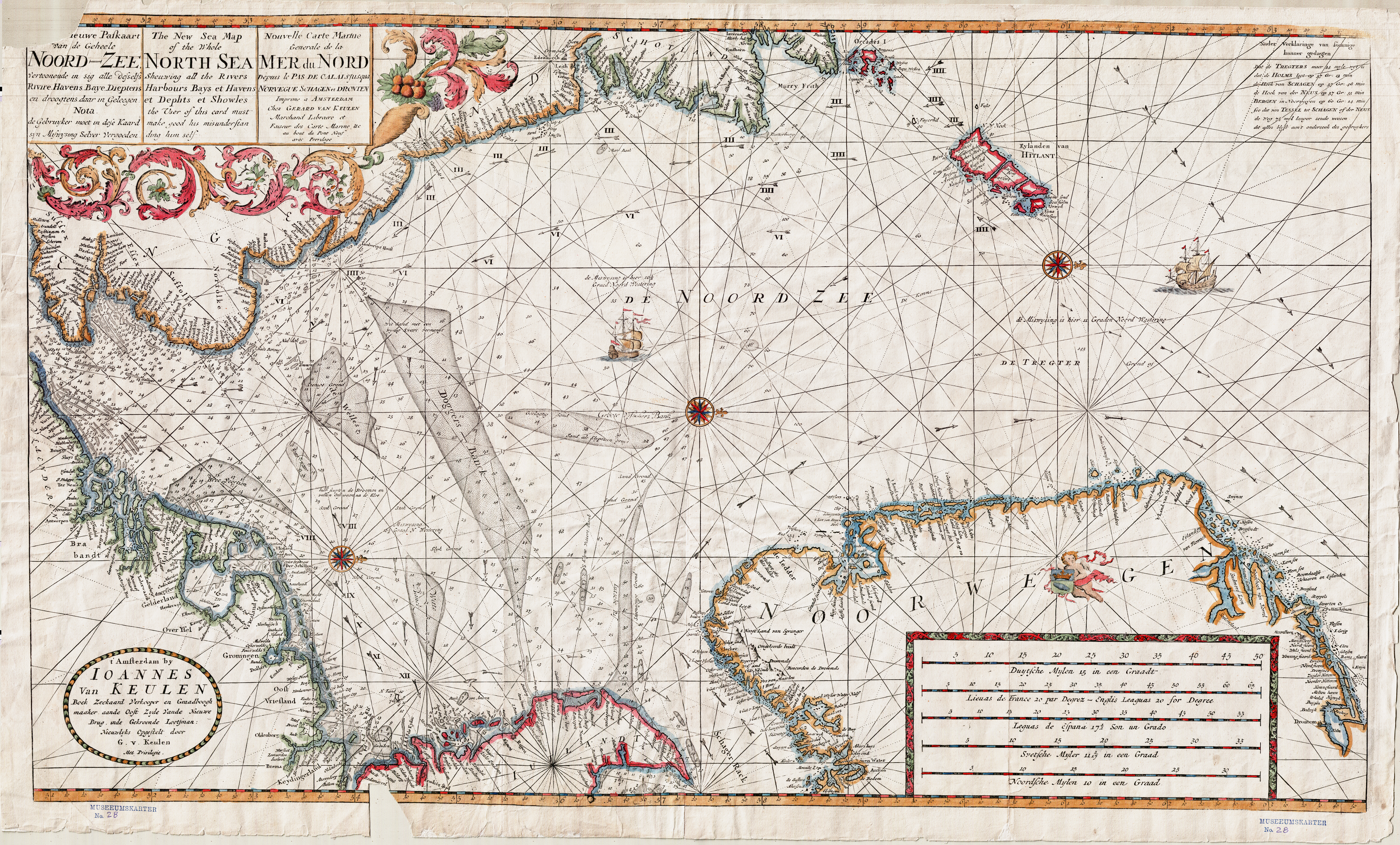
Johannes van Keulen, map of the Northern sea. Unknown date (ca. 1680). A version is kept at the Norwegian Hydrographic Service

Johannes van Keulen (1654 in Deventer – 1715 in Amsterdam) was a 17th-century Dutch cartographer. He published the influential nautical atlas the Zee-Atlas and the pilot guide Zee-Fakkel (meaning Sea-Torch in English).

== Early life ==
Johannes van Keulen was born in 1654 in the Dutch Republic. He was baptised on 8 January 1654 in Amsterdam.

== Career ==
In 1678, van Keulen established himself in Amsterdam as a publisher of nautical charts and pilot guides.

In 1680, he obtained a patent from the States of Holland and West Friesland granting him the exclusive right to print and publish maritime atlases and navigation manuals. These works combined sea charts with written sailing directions used by helmsmen. The patent protected his publications from unauthorized copying, an important safeguard in a trade where the production of engraved charts required significant investment.

Van Keulen operated under the name In de Gekroonde Lootsman ("In the Crowned Pilot"), the imprint of his publishing house. He entered into collaboration with Claes Jansz Vooght, an Amsterdam cartographer and mathematician who played a key role in the preparation of charts for the firm’s publications.

He also acquired the stock of Hendrik Doncker, an Amsterdam publisher of nautical charts, which provided access to existing materials and strengthened his position within the Dutch maritime publishing trade.

Van Keulen built a firm that became one of the leading producers of navigational works in the Dutch Republic, supplying charts and sailing directions used by mariners across European and overseas routes.

== Works ==
From 1681 onwards the Nieuwe Lichtende Zee-Fakkel appeared, a five-volume atlas for which Vooght compiled the maps. The work was illustrated by Jan Luyken. Published between 1681 and 1684, the five-volume Zee-Fakkel contained more than 130 new charts and brought van Keulen wide recognition as a publisher of nautical atlases.

== Descendants ==
His son, Gerard van Keulen (1678–1726), continued his work and produced new editions of the various volumes. Grandson Johannes II van Keulen (1704–1755) published a new edition of the volume with maps of Asian waters, first published in 1753. The wife of Johannes II, Catharina Buijs (1714–1781), took over the business when her husband died and assumed his position of official mapmaker for the Amsterdam office of the powerful Dutch East India Company. On her death, her son, Gerard Hulst van Keulen (1733–1801) occupied himself with the last editions of the Zee-Fakkel. The business prospered until 1885 when it was finally liquidated after operating successfully for more than two centuries.
