= Seasoned equity offering =

Capital increase

A seasoned equity offering (SEO) or capital increase is a new equity issued by an already publicly traded company. Seasoned offerings may involve shares sold by existing shareholders (non-dilutive), new shares (dilutive), or both. If the seasoned equity offering is made by an issuer that meets certain regulatory criteria, it may be a shelf offering.

In a broader corporate-law sense, a capital increase is an extraordinary corporate transaction that may be carried out either through a change in the company's equity by means of a paid capital increase, or through the allocation of available reserves or balance-sheet funds, usually referred to as a bonus or free capital increase.

== Description ==
A capital increase may take place either through the issue of new shares or through an increase in the nominal value of existing shares.

In many legal systems, new shares must be offered first to existing shareholders through pre-emption rights or subscription rights, in proportion to the shares or quotas already held. This mechanism allows shareholders to maintain their percentage ownership of the company's share capital. In the case of companies that have issued convertible bonds, similar protection may be granted to holders of convertible bonds in order to preserve the agreed conversion ratio.

A paid capital increase may be indivisible or divisible, depending on the terms of the shareholders' resolution. If the increase is indivisible, it becomes effective only when the entire amount has been subscribed. If it is divisible, the increase may become effective only for the amount actually subscribed by the end of the subscription period.

Depending on the applicable company law and the company's governing documents, shareholders may also be granted a right of first refusal over shares that remain unsubscribed after the exercise of subscription rights.

== Anti-dilution clauses ==
A capital increase may dilute the economic value of each share or reduce the percentage ownership held by existing shareholders.

Company bylaws and shareholders' agreements may include anti-dilution clauses designed to protect shareholders from dilution in the event of future capital increases. In Italian corporate practice, the legitimacy of such clauses has been recognized by the Notarial Council of Milan in its Guideline No. 186.

== See also ==
- Initial public offering – Type of securities offering in which a private company goes public
- Public offering – Offering of securities of a company to the public
- Reduction of capital
- Rights issue – Dividend of subscription rights to buy additional securities in a company
- Secondary market offering – Registered offering of a security that was previously issued to the public
- Share capital – Portion of a company's equity
- Shareholders' equity – Ownership of property reduced by its liabilities
- Stock market – Place where stocks are traded
- Buyback
