= Secondary shares =

Existing shares sold by current holders

In an IPO, secondary shares (in contrast to primary shares) refer to existing shares of common stock that are sold to investors in an offering (see Secondary Market Offering). The selling of these secondary shares may be from existing shareholders. Since these shares do not increase the number of total shares outstanding, the offering is referred to as "non-dilutive" (to EPS).
