= Co-buying =

Co-buying, or cooperative buying, is organizing people or companies and using the created negotiation power to lower the price or enhancing the conditions in an agreement. As in Scandinavia the first recorded co-buying organization in the US was formed by farmers in mid-19th century.

A similar phenomenon is buyers club.

Not to be confused with the phenomenon Groupon – coupon sales. Also called team buying it is known as Tuán Gòu (Chinese: 团购)

== See also ==
- Consumer cooperatives
