= Browser user interface =

A browser user interface (or BUI) is a method of interacting with an application, typically hosted on a remote device, via controls presented within a web browser. This is an alternative to providing controls via a separate application with a dedicated graphical user interface (GUI) or command-line interface (CLI).

BUIs have become common for devices that have their own embedded microprocessor and network interface, such as a printer or network router.

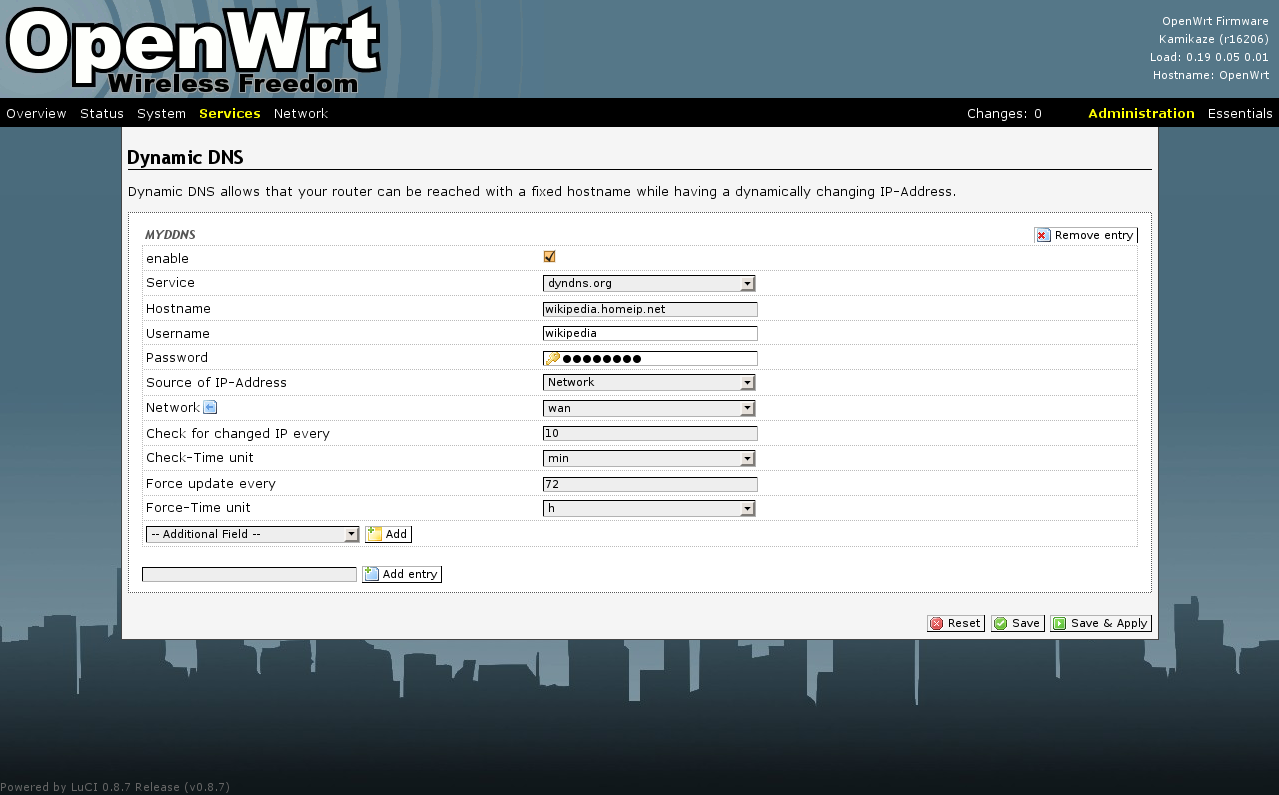
A BUI for configuring a network router

Since it is now expected that most owners or managers of such devices have access to a computer with a web browser, it is more convenient for both the device manufacturer and the device owner to use a BUI rather than shipping a separate GUI application, which would require installation and updates on one or more computers. A web browser provides a much richer interface environment than a command-line interface.

Outside of device management, one can use a web browser to access email, Gmail being the most well-known example.
