= Computer Bild =

German computer magazine

- Editor: Dirk General-Kuchel
- Categories: Computer magazine
- Frequency: Fortnightly
- Circulation: 236,964 (Q2 2016; in Germany)
- Publisher: Axel Springer SE
- First issue: Germany 2 September 1996; Poland 7 October 1998; France: 1998; Spain: 1998; Czech Republic: 2003; Italy: 2004; Lithuania: 2004; Romania: 2005; Bulgaria: 2006; Russia: 2006
- Country: Germany
- Based in: Hamburg
- Website: computerbild.de

Computer Bild is a German fortnightly computer magazine published by Axel Springer SE. It is published in nine countries, and is one of Europe's best selling computer magazines.

== History and profile ==
Former logo

Computer Bild was first published in 1996. The editor is Axel Telzerow who has held his position since February 2012, and his predecessor Hans-Martin Burr was in office since October 2006. Previously, the editor since the formation of the magazine was the magazine's founder Harald Kuppek, who left the position in December 2006.

In Germany Computer Bild is published on a fortnightly basis. The magazine has a Polish edition which is part of Axel Springer SE via its subsidiary Axel Springer Polska. It is adapted for each country in which it is published.

== Circulation ==
Computer Bild had a circulation of 1,057,000 copies in 2001. Its Italian edition sold 36,082 copies in 2007. The circulation of the magazine was 686,527 copies in 2010 in Germany. Its circulation was 505,600 copies in Germany in 2012. During the second quarter of 2016 the magazine had a circulation of 236,964 copies in the country.
