= BYI =

BYI could refer to:

- Bally Technologies; New York Stock Exchange symbol BYI
- Barry Island railway station; National Rail station code BYI
- Burley Municipal Airport, Idaho, United States; IATA airport code BYI
