= Catharina Buijs =

Dutch mapmaker and publisher

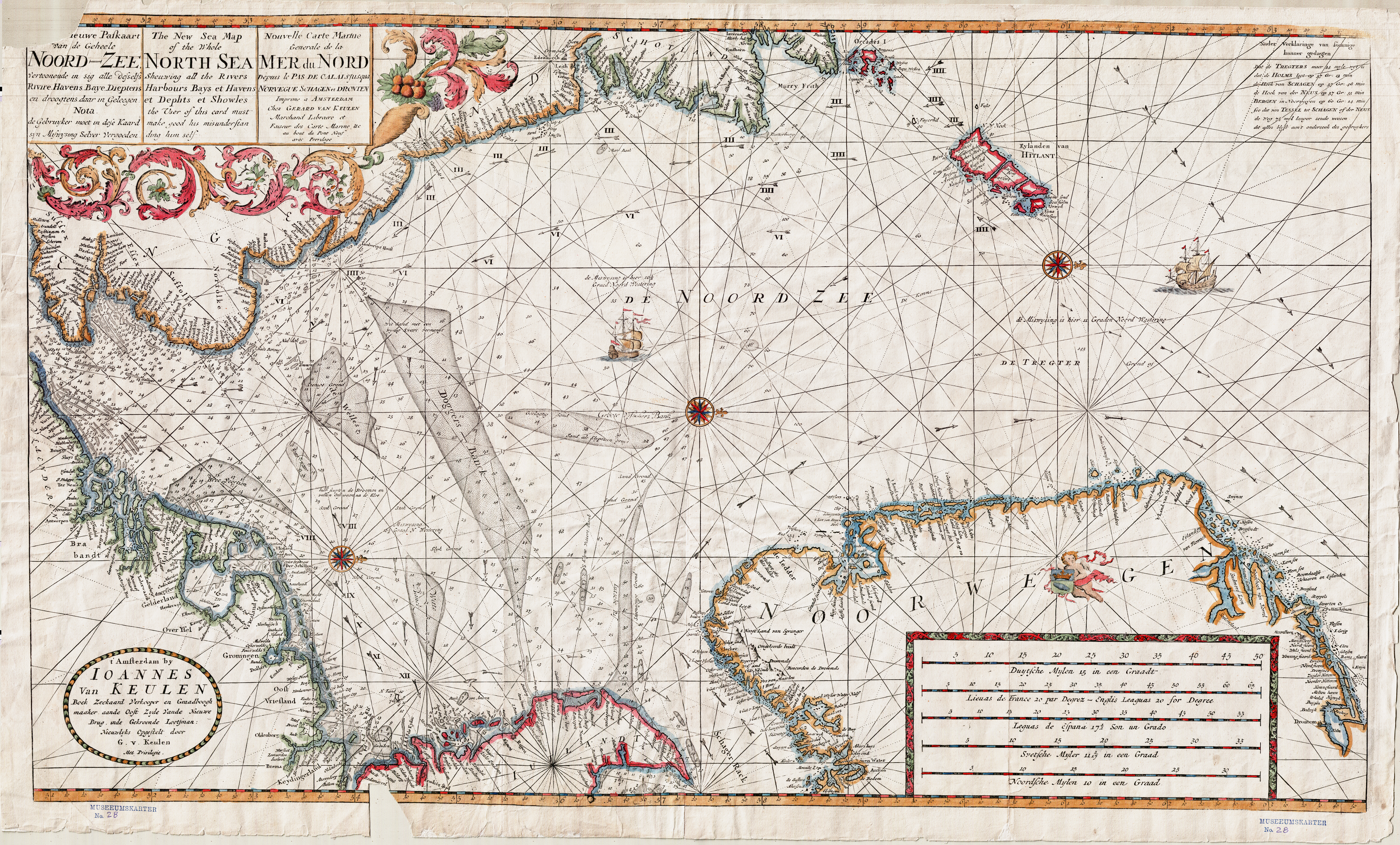
- Sea chart from the Van Keulen publishing house, late 17th–18th century
- Born: 1714; Amsterdam, Dutch Republic
- Died: 1781; Amsterdam, Dutch Republic
- Occupations: Cartographer, publisher
- Spouses: Johannes van Keulen II; Hendrik Post
- Children: 2

Catharina Buijs (1714–1781), was a Dutch cartographer and publisher who became an important mapmaker for the powerful Dutch East India Company.

== Biography ==
Catharina Buijs married (1732) the Amsterdam cartographer and publisher Johannes van Keulen II (1704–1755) who owned a successful map-making business. They had two sons, Gerard Hulst van Keulen (1733–1801) and Cornelis Buijs van Keulen (1736–1774), both of whom played a role in the company.

After her husband's death, Buijs continued to run the Van Keulen family business which, according to Storms, made her "the most important female Dutch cartographer of the early modern period."

From the time she took charge of the business in 1755, Buijs was the official mapmaker for the Amsterdam office of the powerful Dutch East India Company. In addition, her company became a renowned publisher and seller of sea atlases and charts, helmsman's guides, and books, and also a manufacturer and distributor of navigation instruments.

Beginning in 1772, she turned over partial control of the Van Keulen company to both of her sons, an arrangement that stood until her death in 1781. At that time, her only surviving son Gerard Hulst van Keulen took over her position. The Van Keulen family business prospered until 1885 when it was finally liquidated after operating successfully for more than two centuries.

== Personal life ==
In 1756, she registered in Amsterdam to remarry and became the second wife of Hendrik Post (1708–1761).
