= By, Doubs =

By
- Commune
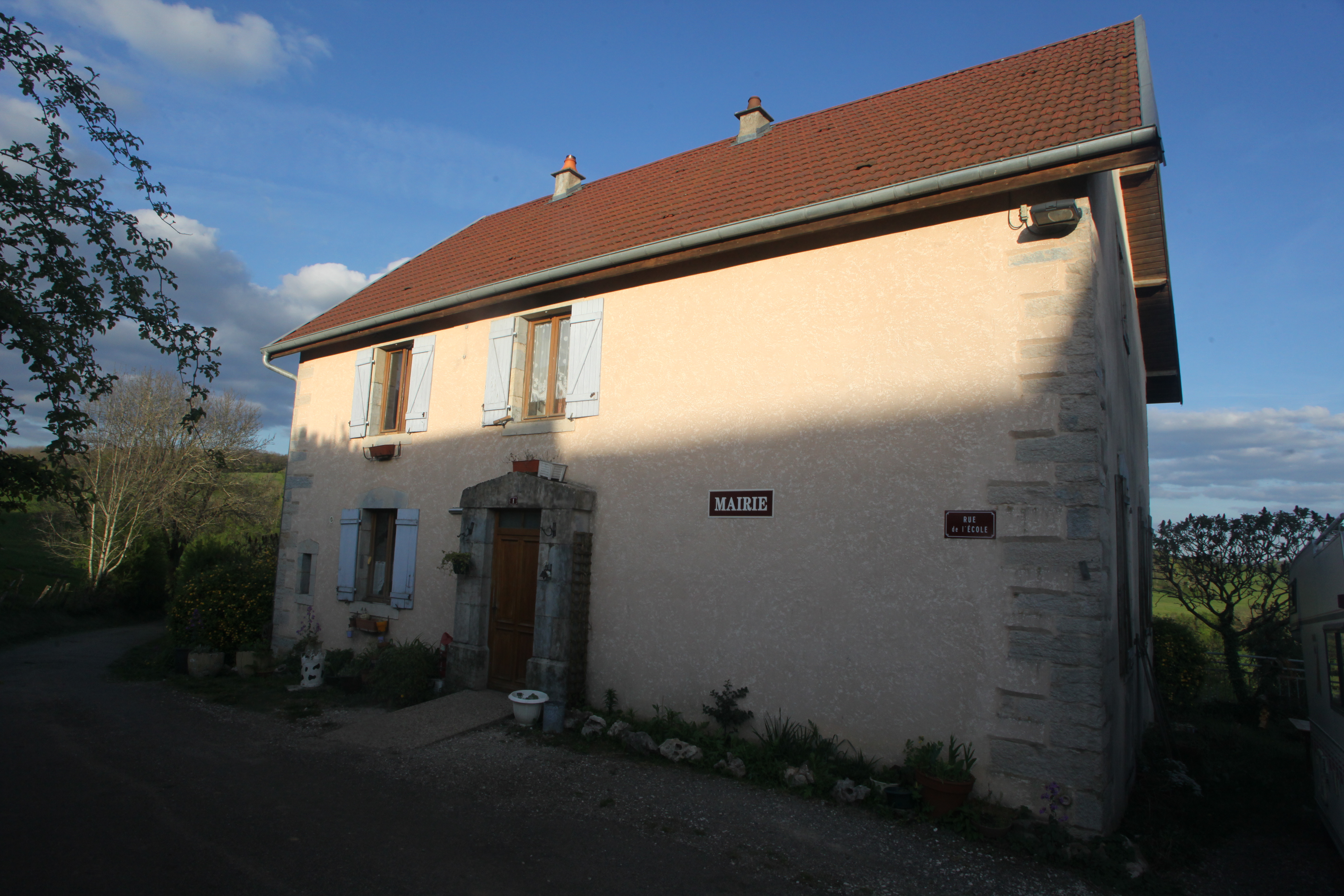
- The town hall in By
- Location of By
- Location within France Location within Bourgogne-Franche-Comté
- Coordinates: 47°00′50″N 5°53′24″E
- Country: France
- Region: Bourgogne-Franche-Comté
- Department: Doubs
- Arrondissement: Besançon
- Canton: Saint-Vit
- Intercommunality: Loue-Lison

Government
  - Mayor (2020–2026): Elisabeth Jacques
- Area^{1}: 7.34 km^{2} (2.83 sq mi)
- Highest elevation: 638 m (2,093 ft)
- Lowest elevation: 458 m (1,503 ft)
- Population (2023): 79
  - Density: 11/km^{2} (28/sq mi)
- Time zone: UTC+01:00 (CET)
  - Summer (DST): UTC+02:00 (CEST)
- INSEE/Postal code: 25104 /25440
- ^{1} French Land Register data, which excludes lakes, ponds, glaciers > 1 km^{2} (0.386 sq mi or 247 acres) and river estuaries.

By (French pronunciation: [bi]) is a commune in the Doubs department in the Bourgogne-Franche-Comté region in eastern France.

== Population ==
Historical population
Year	Pop.	±% p.a.
1968	101	—
1975	67	−5.69%
1982	52	−3.56%
1990	65	+2.83%
1999	80	+2.33%
2007	80	+0.00%
2012	69	−2.92%
2017	78	+2.48%
2023	79	+0.21%
Source: INSEE

== See also ==
- Communes of the Doubs department
