= Gaston Bouy =

French painter (1866–1943)

- Born: 2 September 1866; Bois-Colombes, Hauts-de-Seine, France
- Died: 1943 (aged 76–77)
- Education: Académie Julian; École des Beaux-Arts

Henri-Gaston-Jules-Louis Bouy (2 September 1866 – 1943), known as Gaston Bouy [ɡastɔ̃ bwi], was a French artist who studied under Amédée Bourson and exhibited at the Salon des Artistes Francais. He mostly worked in pastels and his female figures are especially prized.
