= Primary shares =

Newly issued shares of common stock

In an equity offering, primary shares, in contrast to secondary shares, refer to newly issued shares of common stock. Proceeds from the sale of primary shares go to the issuer, while those from preexisting secondary shares go to shareholders.

Most initial public offerings (IPOs) have a mix of both primary and secondary shares.
