= Secondary market offering =

Registered offering of a security that was previously issued to the public

A secondary market offering, according to the U.S. Financial Industry Regulatory Authority (FINRA), is a registered offering of a large block of a security that has been previously issued to the public. The blocks being offered may have been held by large investors or institutions, and proceeds of the sale go to those holders, not the issuing company. It is also called a secondary distribution.

A secondary offering is not dilutive to existing shareholders since no new shares are created. The proceeds from the sale of the securities do not benefit the issuing company in any way. The offered shares are privately held by shareholders of the issuing company, who may be directors or other insiders (such as venture capitalists) who may be looking to diversify their holdings. Usually, however, the increase in available shares allows more institutions to take non-trivial positions in the issuing company which may benefit the trading liquidity of the issuing company's shares.

A secondary market offering should not be confused with a follow-on offering, otherwise known as a subsequent offering, or a dilutive secondary offering. In a follow-on offering, the company itself places new shares onto the market, thus diluting the existing shares. "Secondary market offering" can be understood as an offering on the secondary market, and is thus different from a secondary offering on the primary market — in other words, an offering following an initial, primary-market offering. A follow-on offering which is the second offering from a company can be understood as a secondary offering on a primary market, which is where the confusion between a dilutive (follow-on) and a non-dilutive secondary market offering possibly comes from. If a company were to make a third, primary-market offering, this would be a follow-on offering which is not a secondary market offering. "Secondary offering" as described in this article is an offering on the secondary market which is non-dilutive, and is thus not a follow-on offering.

== See also ==
- Public offering
- Corporate finance
- Follow-on offering
- Primary market
- Secondary market
- Seasoned equity offering
- At-the-market offering
