= Predictive buying =

Digital marketing technique

Predictive Buying is a marketing industry term describing the use of algorithmic consumer analytics to predict future buying patterns. Predictive buying combines data mining with statistical analysis to predict what a customer wants to buy, and then present that customer with advertisements for that product. It is a type of targeted advertisement. Predictive marketing is used by websites such as Amazon and advertising publishers such as Google and Facebook.

== Benefits ==
While direct marketing (displaying the same promotional material to all consumers) and content-relevant ads (showing promotional material related to the content of an article) are both personal advertisements, they are independent of the particular consumer. Promoters of predictive marketing argue that it increases purchases by predicting what a consumer wants to buy and then showing them adverts for that. Even if the consumer does not know of a product's existence, predictive buying technology can, through an analysis of the consumer's interactions on other websites, purchase history and other factors, bring that product to the consumer's attention.

== Criticism ==
The statistical nature of predictive buying means it will never match perfectly every time - some advertising space will be taken up with adverts that do not work. The reduction of this mismatch rate is one of the key goals of an advertisement firm. The amount of mismatch also increases the less information is available to predict from.

Critics, such as Cory Doctorow, have pointed out that this mismatch creates a sort of arms race between marketing firms - who try and collect more and more data to further improve their predictions - and consumers, who over time learn to ignore or become desensitized to adverts. Eventually, the amount of data collected requires expensive processing infrastructure - data centers - and this drives the market towards concentration in a few large firms. The more data is collected, the more personally valuable data is collected and additionally the greater the effects of a data breach. There are also concerns about consumer privacy.

For the business owner, the consequences of this arms race are that most of the money that is spent on predictive marketing will be wasted because, like all advertisements, they will be ignored. However, the money wasted on predictive marketing is higher than the money wasted on content-relevant adverts (for example), because predictive marketing firms charge a premium for their increased data collection and more complicated processing in exchange for purportedly improved marketing results.
