= Buy (river) =

Buy River
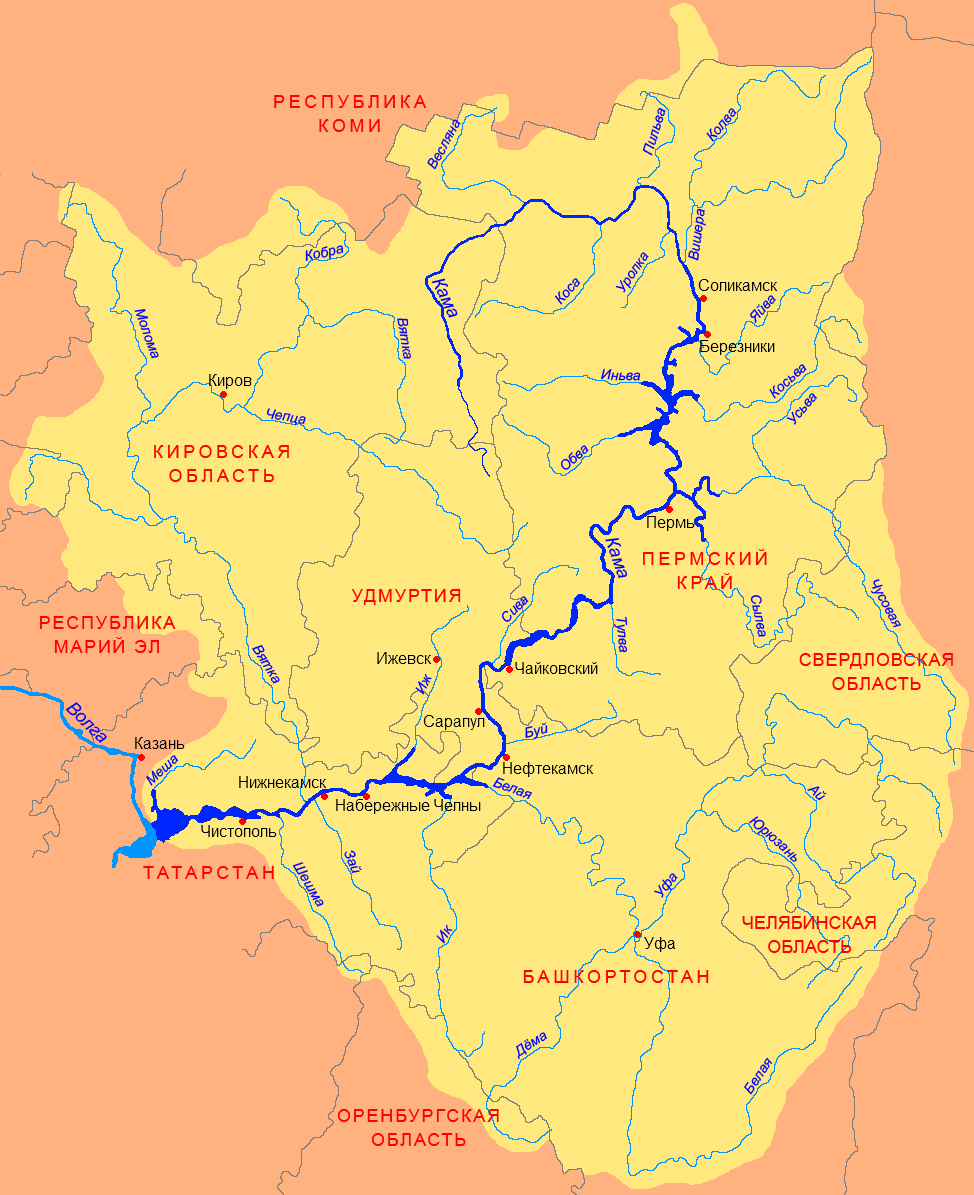
- Map of the Kama River basin (in Russian)

Location
- Country: Russia

Physical characteristics
- Source
  - location: Kuyedinsky District
- Mouth: Kama
  - coordinates: 56.2064°N 54.1911°E
- Length: 228 km (142 mi)
- Basin size: 6,530 km^{2} (2,520 sq mi)

Basin features
- Progression: Kama→ Volga→ Caspian Sea

The Buy (Russian: Буй; Bashkir: Беүә, Bewä) is a river in Perm Krai, the Republic of Bashkortostan and the Republic of Udmurtia, Russia. It is a left tributary of the Kama. It is 228 kilometres (142 mi) long, with a drainage basin of 6,530 square kilometres (2,520 mi^{2}).

It starts in the south of Perm Krai, in the Kuyedinsky District. Then, it flows through northwestern Bashkortostan and into the Kama River within the Udmurt Republic, to the south of the town of Kambarka.

Main tributaries:

- Left: Arey (Äri), Amzya (Ämzä)
- Right: Oshya (Uş’â), Piz
