= Buy.at =

buy.at
- Industry: Affiliate marketing
- Founded: 2002
- Founders: Steven Brown, David Brown, Paul Fellows, Malcom Cowley, Richard Armatige (Perfiliate Technologies Ltd)
- Fate: Became wholly owned business unit of Advertising.com

buy.at was an online affiliate marketing platform launched it 2002. It was bought by AOL in 2008 and sold to Digital Window in 2010. It was replaced by Digital Window's "Affiliate Window" on June 11, 2012. This coincided with the US launch of Affiliate Window's platform for advertisers and publishers. The domain was bought by company Frankcom IT Service in January 2017 together with others to be projected later.

== History ==
The buy.at affiliate network was founded in 2002 by British company Perfiliate Technologies Ltd, which was founded in 1999. The network grew to become the UK’s largest independent affiliate marketing network. The company generated an average 250% year-over-year revenue growth from 2004 to 2006. It was the UK’s ninth fastest-growing technology company in the 2007 according to The Sunday Times's Tech Track 100, and the fastest-growing affiliate network in the UK according to New Media Age (NMA).

buy.at received several awards for campaign performance and overall operations:

- 2003 New Statesman New Media Award for ‘Contribution to Civic Society'
- 2003 Finalist in the Revolution 2003 Awards for ‘Most Innovative Online Business'
- 2003 Regional winner of the National E-Commerce Awards, E-Trading Category
- 2007 Travolution award for best affiliate marketing campaign (LateRooms)
- Highly commended as ‘Publisher Choice of Network 2007’ at The Performance Marketing Awards (formerly A4U awards)
- Highly commended for the ‘Innovation in Affiliate Marketing – Network Award’ at The Performance Marketing Awards (formerly A4U awards) in 2007

In 2007, buy.at acquired Lightstate (rebranded as buy.at leads) to expand capabilities and product offerings for advertisers and affiliates in the lead generation space. The same year it expanded to the United States, opening an office in New York and launching Ticketmaster’s US affiliate program in December.

buy.at was bought by AOL in 2008 to operate as a wholly owned business unit of Advertising.com. This acquisition marked the official launch of buy.at’s network in the United States.

Coinciding with AOL’s ‘Platform-A’ European expansion, buy.at began supporting clients in Denmark, Finland, the Netherlands, Norway and Sweden in 2009. In the same year, buy.at’s Agnieszka Marchewka was commended for ‘Publishers Choice of Account Manager’ at The Performance Marketing Awards (formerly A4U awards).

In 2010, AOL sold buy.at to Digital Window, who already owned Affiliate Window in the UK.

In 2017 the domain was sold again - together with a high quality .at domain portfolio - to company Frankcom IT Service in Germany.
