= Piz (river) =

Location
- Country: Russia

Physical characteristics
- Source
  - location: Yelovsky District
- Mouth: Buy
  - coordinates: 56.2429°N 54.3854°E
- Length: 151 km (94 mi)
- Basin size: 2,210 km^{2} (850 sq mi)

Basin features
- Progression: Buy→ Kama→ Volga→ Caspian Sea

The Piz (Russian: Пизь) is a right tributary of the river Buy in Perm Krai, the Republic of Bashkortostan and the Republic of Udmurtia, Russia. It is 151 kilometres (94 mi) long, with a drainage basin of 2,210 square kilometres (850 mi^{2}). It starts in the Yelovsky District of Perm Krai, then flows through Chaikovsky District on the border with Bashkortostan. It empties into the Buy on the border between the Udmurt Republic and Bashkortostan, 20 kilometres (12 mi) from the larger river's mouth.

Main tributaries:

- Left: Bolshaya Usa
- Right: Posha
