= Liquidity event =

In corporate finance, a liquidity event is a transaction that enables the owners of a company to realize the value of their investment, such as a merger, acquisition or initial public offering. A liquidity event is a typical exit strategy for private investors, who otherwise have difficulty proving the company's value.

A liquidity event is not to be confused with the liquidation of a company, in which the company's business is discontinued.
