= Bouy =

- Commune
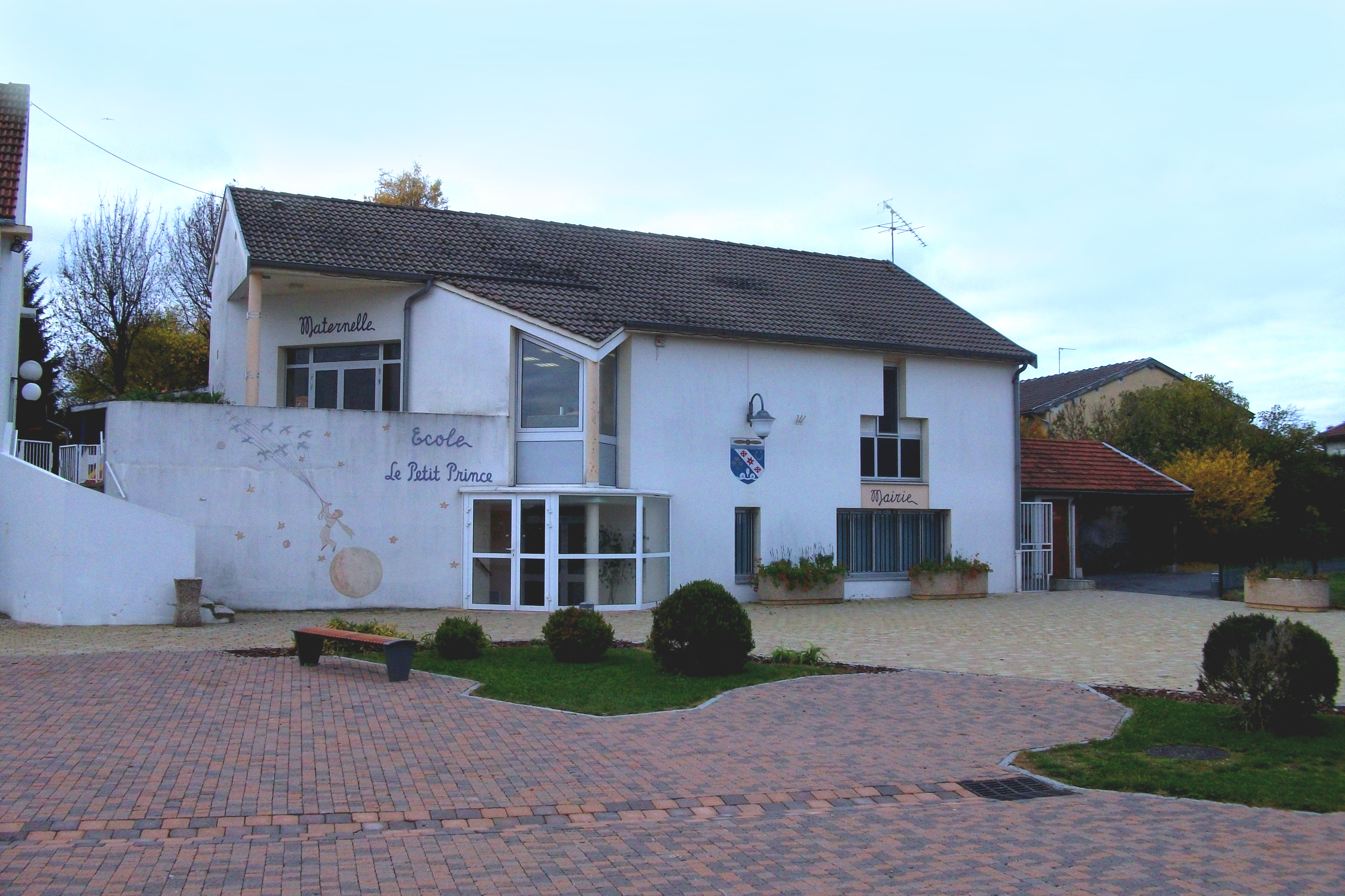
- The town hall in Bouy

- Coat of arms
- Location of Bouy
- Location within France Location within Grand Est
- Coordinates: 49°05′14″N 4°21′01″E
- Country: France
- Region: Grand Est
- Department: Marne
- Arrondissement: Châlons-en-Champagne
- Canton: Mourmelon-Vesle et Monts de Champagne
- Intercommunality: CA Châlons-en-Champagne

Government
  - Mayor (2020–2026): Thierry Chappat
- Area^{1}: 22.46 km^{2} (8.67 sq mi)
- Elevation: 115 m (377 ft)
- Population (2023): 533
  - Density: 23.7/km^{2} (61.5/sq mi)
- Time zone: UTC+01:00 (CET)
  - Summer (DST): UTC+02:00 (CEST)
- INSEE/Postal code: 51078 /51400
- ^{1} French Land Register data, which excludes lakes, ponds, glaciers > 1 km^{2} (0.386 sq mi or 247 acres) and river estuaries.

Bouy (French pronunciation: [bwi]) is a commune of the Marne department in northeastern France.

== Population ==
Historical population
Year	Pop.	±% p.a.
1968	364	—
1975	409	+1.68%
1982	356	−1.96%
1990	393	+1.24%
1999	422	+0.79%
2007	453	+0.89%
2012	530	+3.19%
2017	567	+1.36%
2023	533	−1.03%
Source: INSEE

== International relations ==
Bouy is twinned with the English village of Everton in Nottinghamshire, UK.

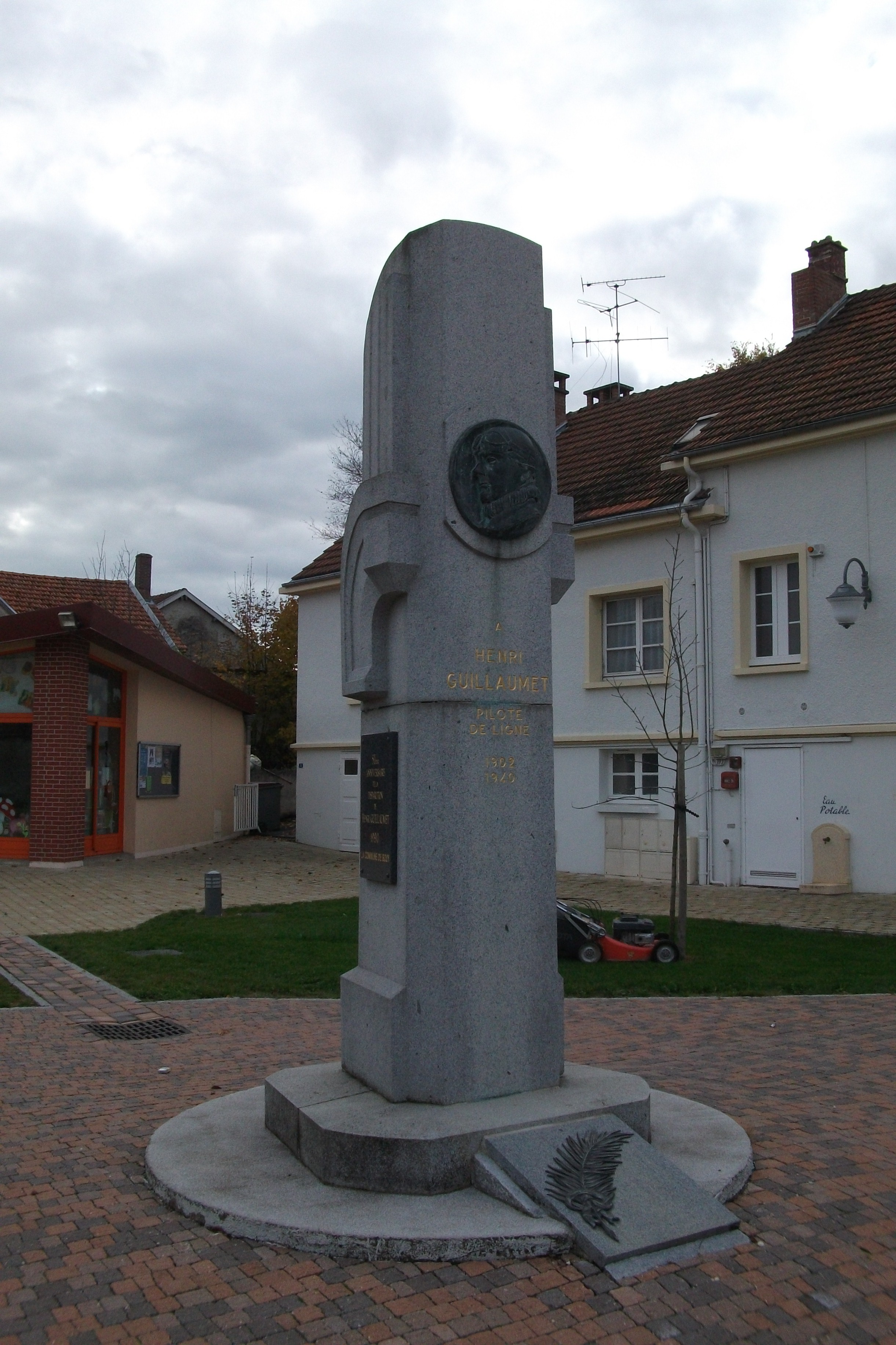
tribute to Henri Guillaumet.

== See also ==
- Communes of the Marne department
