= Buys =

Buys is a Dutch surname. It may refer to:

- C. H. D. Buys Ballot (1817–1890), Dutch chemist
- Frieke Buys, Dutch swimmer
- Izak Buys, Dutch cricket player
- Jacobus Buys (1724–1801), Dutch painter
- Jenna-Anne Buys, South African figure skater
- Kevin Buys (1986–2026), South African rugby union player
- Willem Buys (1661–1749), Dutch civil official
