= Buyback =

Buyback may refer to:

== Products ==
- Buyback of a failed product under an American Lemon law
- Buyback of a product under a money-back guarantee
- Buyback of vehicles under the Canadian Motor Vehicle Arbitration Plan
- Sale and repurchase agreement of goods

== Finance ==
- Buyback contract, a type of financing deal in the Iranian petroleum industry
- Buyback of shares, see Treasury stock
- Stock buyback, also called share repurchase or share buyback, the repurchase of stock by the company that issued it

== See also ==
- Gun buyback program
- Land Buy-Back Program for Tribal Nations
