= Bichura, Republic of Buryatia =

Rural locality in the Republic of Buryatia, Russia

Bichura Бичура
- Selo

Other transcription(s)
  - Buryat: Бэшүүр
- Interactive map of Bichura
- Location of Bichura Bichura (Republic of Buryatia)
- Coordinates: 50°35′23″N 107°35′46″E
- Country: Russia
- Federal subject: Buryatia
- Administrative district: Bichursky District
- SelsovietSelsoviet: Bichursky
- Founded: 1767
- Elevation: 653 m (2,142 ft)

Population (2010 Census)
  - Total: 9,145
  - Estimate (2021): 8,728 (−4.6%)

Administrative status
  - Capital of: Bichursky District, Bichursky Selsoviet

Municipal status
  - Municipal district: Bichursky Municipal District
  - Rural settlement: Bichursky Rural Settlement
  - Capital of: Bichursky Municipal District, Bichursky Rural Settlement
- Time zone: UTC+8 (MSK+5)
- Postal code: 671360
- OKTMO ID: 81609415101

Bichura (Russian: Бичура́, Buryat: Бэшүүр, Beshüür) is a rural locality (selo) and the administrative center of Bichursky District of the Republic of Buryatia, Russia. Population: 9,145 (2010 census); 9,737 (2002 census); 11,156 (1989 Soviet census).

== Галерея ==
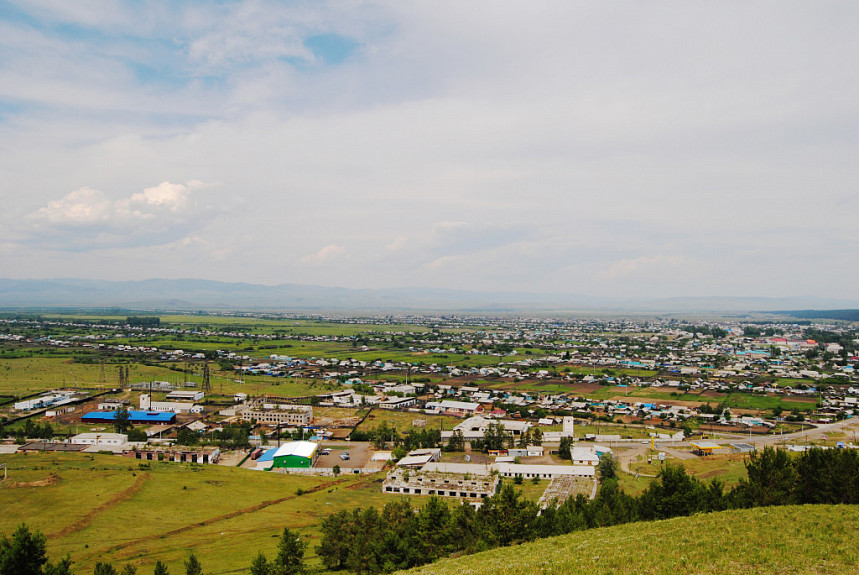
Bichura village (Buryatia)

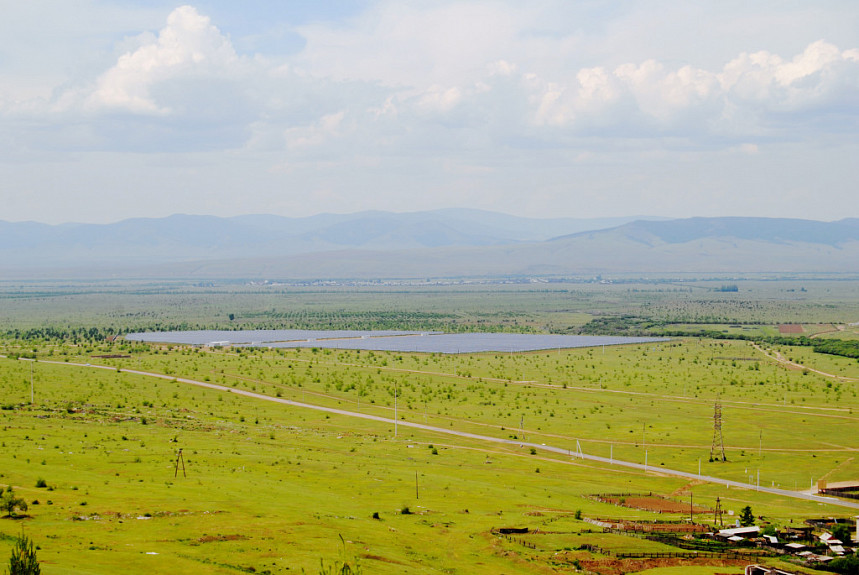
Solar power plant in Bichur

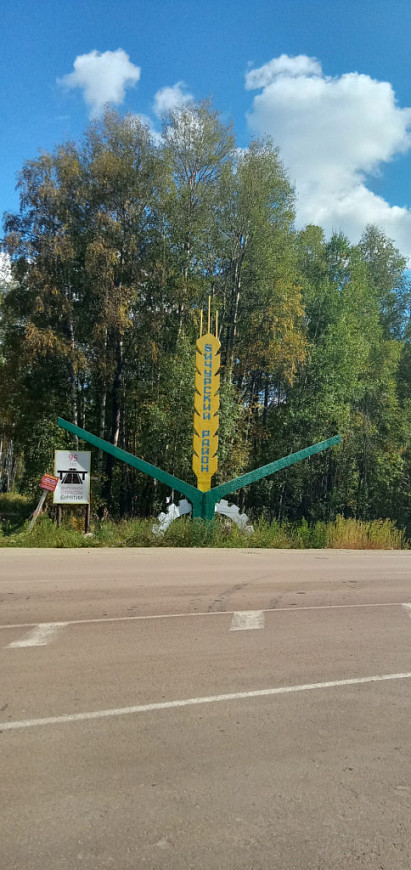
Stela on the border of Bichursky district
