= Bichursky District =

Bichursky District Бичурский район (Russian)
- District

Other transcription(s)
  - Buryat: Бэшүүрэй аймаг
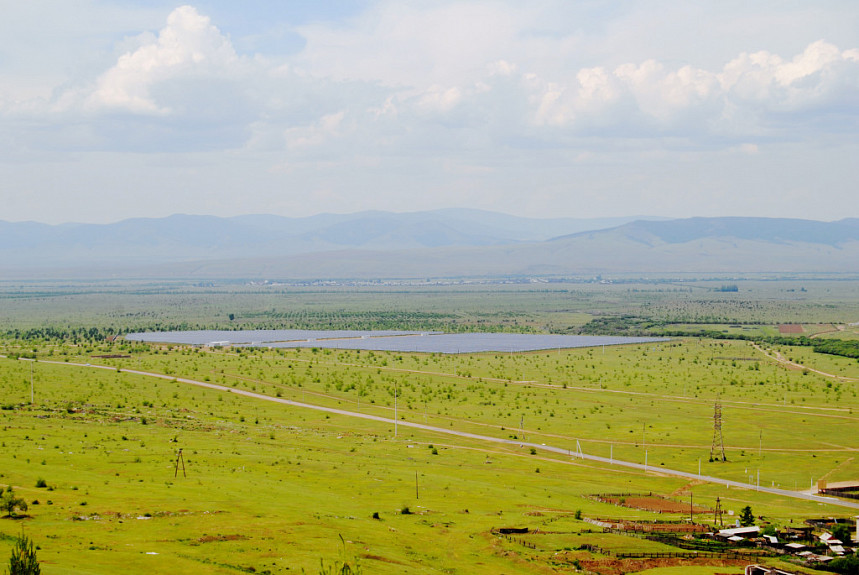

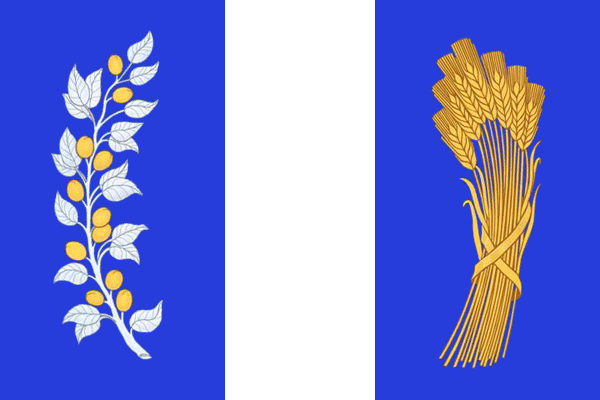
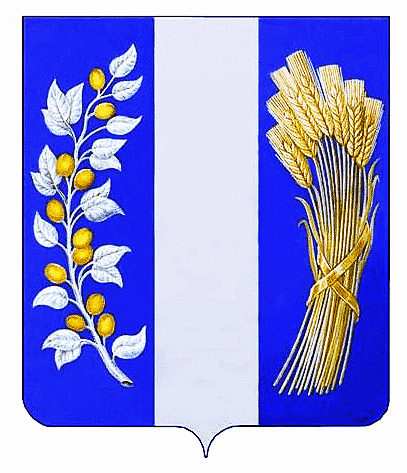
- Flag Coat of arms
- Location of Bichursky District in the Republic of Buryatia
- Coordinates: 50°35′N 107°36′E
- Country: Russia
- Federal subject: Republic of Buryatia
- Established: February 11, 1935
- Administrative center: Bichura

Area
  - Total: 6,201 km^{2} (2,394 sq mi)

Population (2010 Census)
  - Total: 25,352
  - Density: 4.088/km^{2} (10.59/sq mi)
  - Urban: 0%
  - Rural: 100%

Administrative structure
  - Administrative divisions: 13 Selsoviets, 5 Somons
  - Inhabited localities: 36 rural localities

Municipal structure
  - Municipally incorporated as: Bichursky Municipal District
  - Municipal divisions: 0 urban settlements, 17 rural settlements
- Time zone: UTC+8 (MSK+5)
- OKTMO ID: 81609000
- Website: http://bichura.org

Population of Bichursky District
- 2010 Census: 25,352
- 2002 Census: 27,015
- 1989 Census: 30,889
- 1979 Census: 29,953

Bichursky District (Russian: Бичу́рский райо́н; Buryat: Бэшүүрэй аймаг, Beshüürei aimag) is an administrative and municipal district (raion), one of the twenty-one in the Republic of Buryatia, Russia. It is located in the south of the republic. The area of the district is 6,201 square kilometers (2,394 sq mi). Its administrative center is the rural locality (a selo) of Bichura. As of the 2010 Census, the total population of the district was 25,352, with the population of Bichura accounting for 36.1% of that number.

== History ==
The district was established on February 11, 1935.

== Administrative and municipal status ==
Within the framework of administrative divisions, Bichursky District is one of the twenty-one in the Republic of Buryatia. The district is divided into thirteen selsoviets and five somons, which comprise thirty-six rural localities. As a municipal division, the district is incorporated as Bichursky Municipal District. Its thirteen selsoviets and five somons are incorporated as seventeen rural settlements within the municipal district. The selo of Bichura serves as the administrative center of both the administrative and municipal district.
