= Pre-IPO =

Pre-initial public offering

Pre-IPO, pre-initial public offering is a late-stage for a private company to raise funds in advance of its listing on a public exchange.

== History ==
Before the dot-com bubble in the late 1990s private firms enjoyed the largest capital flows with initial public offering (IPO). Since then, more and more startups succeed in getting sufficient funding, and as a result, their valuation grew before IPO.

By 2019, this was confirmed by a significant jump in the number of “unicorns”, privately held startup companies valued at over $1 billion.

At the same time, companies took a longer time to stay private: in the United States, the number of publicly listed companies dropped by 52% in 2016 as compared to 1996.

== Advantages over IPO ==
By raising more funds, a private company get an opportunity to mature and better prepare for an IPO.

At the pre-IPO stage investors invest in private firms several months or years prior to their listing: they "freeze" their investments for a longer period of time in the hope of receiving quality assets. An investor exits a pre-IPO deal after the company becomes public or is sold to a strategic investor.

Higher risks that come with such deals mean that pre-IPO shares are cheaper than IPO shares. The discount reflects factors such as limited liquidity, valuation uncertainty, and the possibility that the company may delay or abandon its public listing. At the same time, it is difficult to objectively estimate the value of shares at the pre-IPO stage because a privately held company, unlike a public one, doesn't disclose financial statements.

Another advantage is to offset the risk of loss as compared to the more recent funding stages. However, there is a risk that the company will postpone IPO for a longer period or cancel it altogether.

== Disadvantages for investors ==
There are significant risks and disadvantages to Pre IPO investing. Among others, companies often disclaim any obligation to inform potential investors or even stockholders with financial or other information about the company, other than the bare minimum to avoid fraud. By contrast, in the IPO process and regularly thereafter, public markets must provide audited financial reports and other detailed information provided by regulation. Because public companies make information public, and tend to be larger with more diverse ownership, in-depth third party analysis is common.

Additionally, there is far less liquidity and higher transaction costs for selling private shares, particularly among companies that are smaller or seen as less desirable. There is no guarantee that a seller could find a buyer for private shares at any price.

== Pre-IPO market emergence ==
For a long time pre-IPO was accessible only to major investors, venture funds and other specialized financial organizations. In recent years, the stock market of private companies at pre-IPO has become much more liquid. Brokers of private shares quickly emerged in the U.S.: The Nasdaq Private Market, SharesPost Inc., Forge Global and others. In autumn 2020, JPMorgan announced that the investment bank was launching a new team focused on trading pre-IPO stocks exclusively Manhattan Venture Partners has built their firm by focusing on a handful of high conviction “firm mandated transactions” instead of crossing orders across a large number of companies. Specialist broker-dealers have entered the market with a focus on the Pre IPO market.

== See also ==
- Initial public offering
- Alternative public offering
- Direct Public Offering
- Public offering without listing
- Reverse IPO
