= Slack Technologies =

Canadian software company

Slack Technologies, LLC

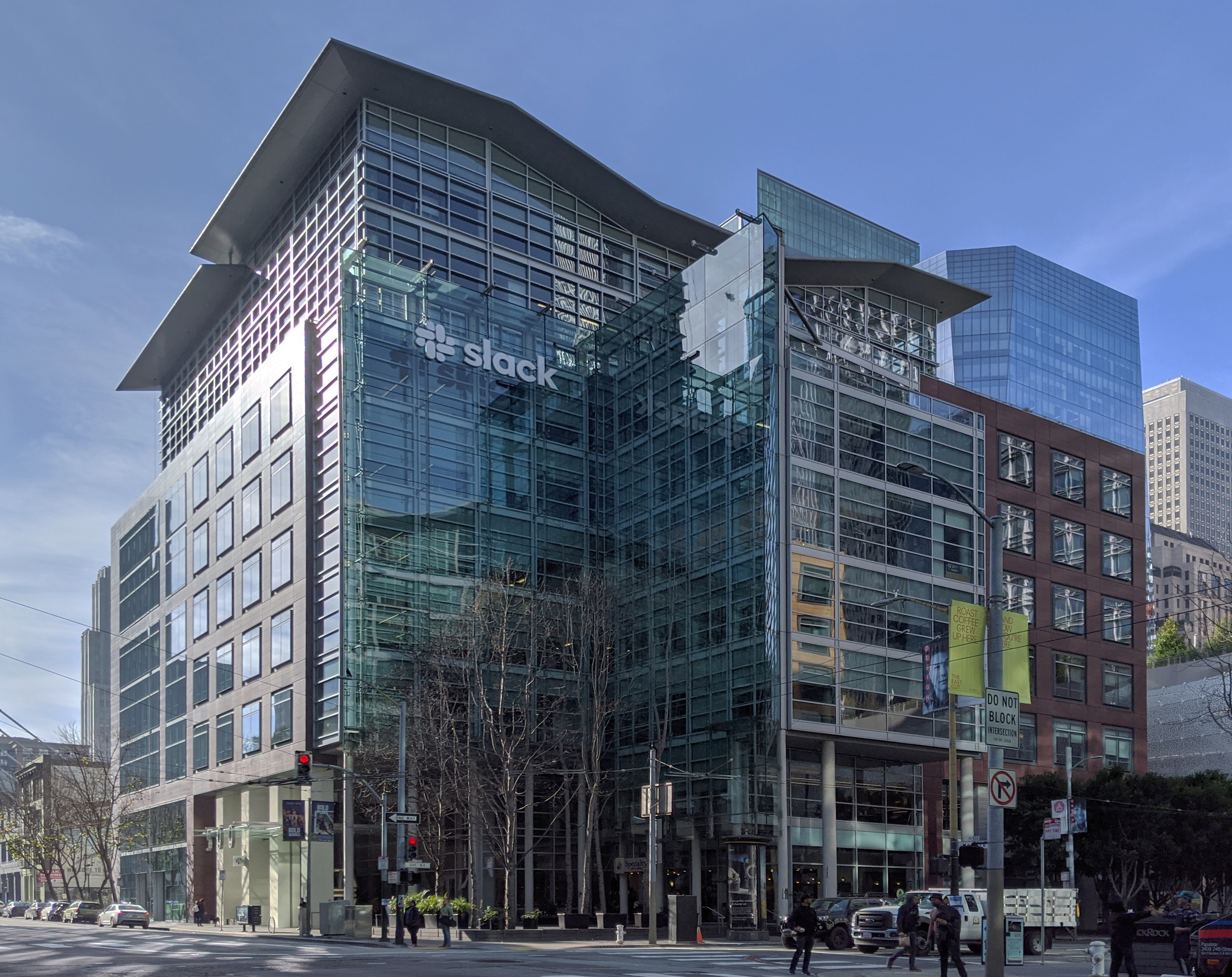
- Slack offices in San Francisco (2020)
- Formerly: Tiny Speck (2009–2014)
- Type: Subsidiary
- Industry: Internet (formerly video games)
- Founded: 2009; 17 years ago in Vancouver, British Columbia, Canada
- Founders: Stewart Butterfield; Eric Costello; Cal Henderson; Serguei Mourachov
- Headquarters: Salesforce Tower; San Francisco, California, U.S.
- Area served: Worldwide
- Key people: Rob Seaman (interim CEO)
- Products: Slack
- Revenue: ▲US$903 million (2020)
- Net income: ▲US$−300 million (2020)
- Number of employees: 2,545 (January 2021)
- Parent: Salesforce
- Website: slack.com

Slack Technologies, LLC is an American software company founded in 2009 in Vancouver, British Columbia, known for its proprietary communication platform Slack. Outside its headquarters in San Francisco, California, Slack also operates offices in New York City, Denver, Toronto, London, Paris, Tokyo, Dublin, Vancouver, Pune, and Melbourne.

On June 20, 2019, Slack Technologies went public on the New York Stock Exchange via a direct stock listing. On December 1, 2020, Salesforce announced its acquisition of Slack for $27.7 billion. On July 21, 2021, the acquisition was closed.

== History ==
Slack logo used between August 2013 and January 2019

=== Initial funding and Glitch ===
The company goes back to the San Francisco-based startup Tiny Speck, which was headed by Stewart Butterfield, the co-founder of the photo-sharing site Flickr. Tiny Speck received angel funding of $1.5 million in 2009, followed by Series A funding of $5 million in 2010 from Accel and Andreessen Horowitz. A Series B round of $10.7 million was raised in 2011.

Tiny Speck's first product was a computer game called Glitch—a social MMORPG with highly stylized 2D graphics. The gameplay was described as follows: "players must learn how to find and grow resources, identify and build community and, at the higher levels of the game, proselytize to those around them". Glitch launched on September 27, 2011, but subsequently "unlaunched" on November 30 to improve gameplay.

In November 2012, it was announced that Glitch would be closed, effective December 9, 2012.

=== Slack and further funding ===
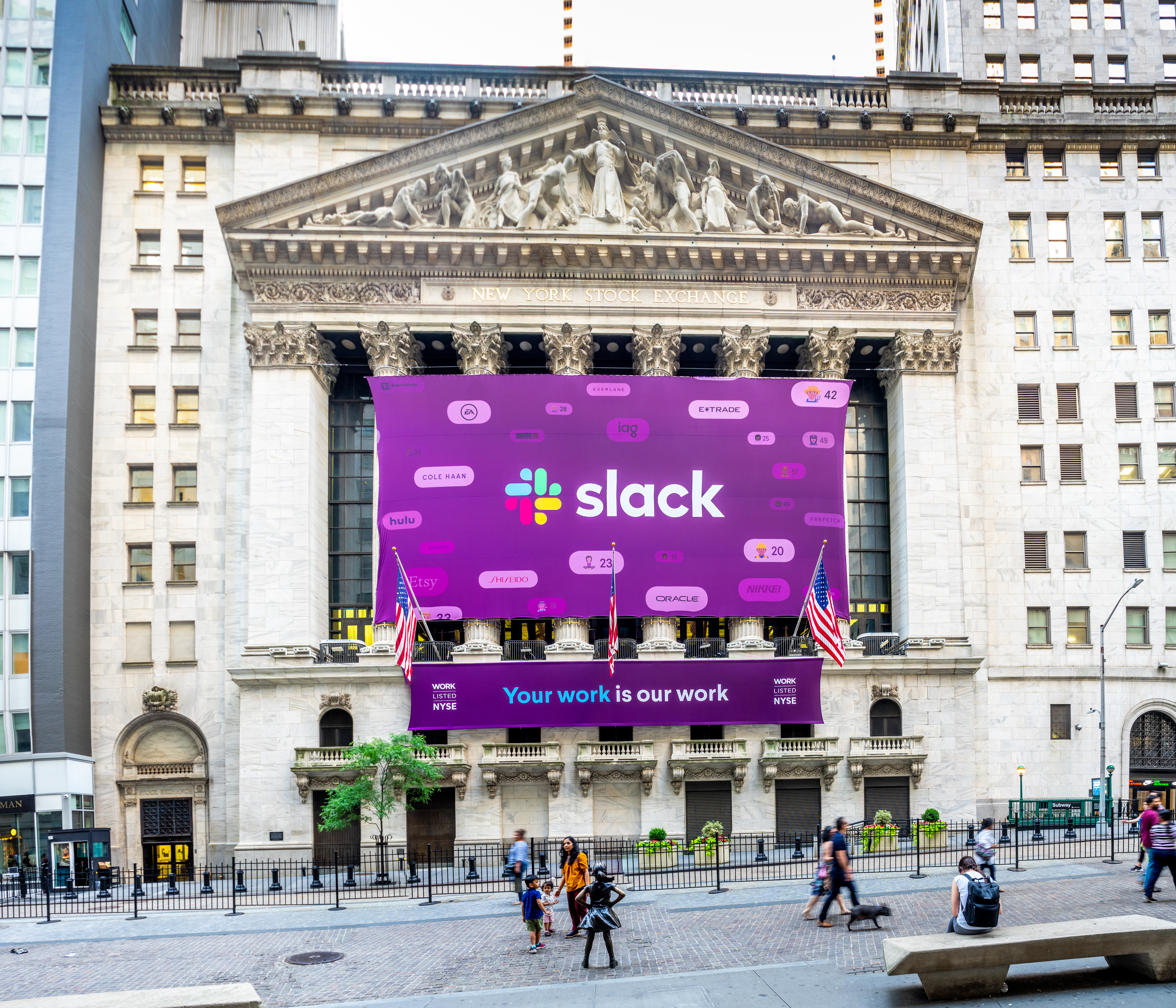
The New York Stock Exchange Building after Slack's direct offering on the NYSE – June 20, 2019

After the closure of Glitch, the company launched the Slack real-time collaboration app and platform, raising $17 million in funding from Andreessen Horowitz, Accel, and Social Capital. After the launch of Slack, the company renamed itself to Slack Technologies in August 2014. The name is an acronym for "Searchable Log of All Conversation and Knowledge". Slack had been an internal tool used for the development of Glitch.

The company raised $42.75 million in April 2014. In October 2014, the company raised $120 million in venture capital with a $1.2 billion valuation led by Kleiner Perkins and GV. Earlier investors Andreessen Horowitz, Accel, and Social Capital also participated in this round.

In January 2015, Slack announced the acquisition of Screenhero, a specialist in voice, video, and screen sharing. In March 2015, Slack signed a deal with investors to raise up to $160 million in a funding round that valued the company at $2.76 billion. New investors include Institutional Venture Partners, Horizons Ventures, Index Ventures, and DST Global.

In April 2015, the company raised another $160 million. In May 2015, Social Capital was a leading investor in a funding round for Slack Technologies.

In April 2016, Slack raised another $200 million, led by Thrive Capital, with participation by GGV, Comcast Ventures and existing investors, including Accel, Index Ventures, and Social Capital. In September 2017, Slack raised $250 million, the majority of which came from Softbank Vision Fund, with about 45% of that, or $112.5 million, originally from the Public Investment Fund of Saudi Arabia. This round put Slack's total fundraising at $841 million and its valuation at $5.1 billion (including cash raised). In early 2018, Slack announced the company's first CFO, Allen Shim.

On July 26, 2018, Atlassian announced the shutdown of its competing HipChat and Stride effective February 11, 2019, and the sale of its intellectual property to Slack. Slack was to pay an undisclosed amount over three years to assume the user bases of the services, and Atlassian was to take a minority investment in Slack. The companies also announced a commitment to work on integration of Slack with Atlassian services.

In September 2018, it was announced the firm was preparing for an initial public offering in the first half of 2019. In November 2018, Slack was recognized in Credit Suisse AG's inaugural Disruptive Technology Recognition (DTR) Program, an annual recognition of five top companies who are disrupting traditional enterprise information technology. On January 16, 2019, Slack announced the launch of the company's new logo.

On December 11, 2018, it was reported that Slack was considering a direct public listing. In the lead-up to its DPO, Slack reported that it had generated $400.6 million in revenue for the fiscal year ending January 31, 2019, up from $220.5 million in the previous year and up from $105.2 million in 2017. Slack also reported losses of $138.9 million for the fiscal year ending in January 2019. On February 4, 2019, several media news outlets reported that Slack had filed for taking the company public. According to The Wall Street Journal, sources indicated the company would pursue a Direct Listing Process (DLP) instead of the traditional IPO. On April 26, 2019, Slack filed its Form S-1 to go public through a direct listing on the New York Stock Exchange, similar to Spotify in 2018. Its stock, ticker WORK, started trading on June 20, 2019. The NYSE set a reference price of $26 to start off trading and the stock rose to more than $41 in the initial hours of trading.

On November 13, 2019, Slack announced the formation of its partner channel as part of its focus on enterprise clients.

On February 10, 2020, it was reported that IBM will deploy Slack to all of its 350,000 employees, making IBM Slack's largest client to date.

On November 25, 2020, the Wall Street Journal reported that Salesforce was in advanced talks to acquire Slack. The deal closed in 2021 for $27.1 billion. Slack was delisted from the NYSE in June 2021 after the acquisition was completed, and shareholders were given Salesforce stock.

Slack announced it would move its headquarters from Foundry Square to Salesforce Tower by the end of February 2023, as part of a consolidation plan by Salesforce.

In December 2025, chief product officer Rob Seaman was named interim CEO.

=== Litigation ===
In July 2020, Slack filed a lawsuit with the European Commission accusing Microsoft of anticompetitive behavior. Slack alleges that Microsoft illegally bundled its competing Microsoft Teams collaboration product with the Microsoft office suite.

==== State court class action ====
In October 2020, investors plaintiffs filed a class action lawsuit against Slack in the California State Superior Court of San Mateo County, alleging securities violations. Plaintiffs claimed, on behalf of individuals who alleged that they acquired Slack Class A common stock in Slack’s June 2019 direct public offering, that Slack violated Sections 11, 12, and 15 of the Securities Act of 1933 because its IPO documentation allegedly had untrue statements and material omissions.

==== Federal court class action ====
Earlier, in April 2020, Judge Susan Illston of the United States District Court for the Northern District of California had issued an order partially granting Slack’s motion to dismiss a similar federal class action complaint against Slack, Pirani v. Slack Technologies. Typically, plaintiffs in Section 11 class actions must show they can trace their shares of stock in the issuer back to the relevant offering. If there have been multiple registration statements, plaintiffs must prove that the shares they purchased were issued under the allegedly false or misleading registration statement. Illiston held that a direct listing is different than the normal offering. This is in one respect true, in that unlike a traditional IPO consisting of "new" shares being offered to the public, a direct listing permits insiders and certain early investors to immediately sell their already outstanding shares, which are immediately tradeable on a stock exchange. In Slack's direct listing, Slack offered 118 million registered shares for resale while at the same time another 164 million unregistered shares also became available without registration pursuant to exemptions to the Securities Act registration requirements. Slack moved to dismiss, arguing that the plaintiff lacked standing because he could not trace his shares back to the registration statement that he claimed was misleading. The judge opined—in an opinion that was later overturned—that that requires a broader reading of Section 11 of the '33 Act of the phrase “such security,” meaning: “acquiring a security of the same nature as that issued pursuant to the registration statement.” As a result, she denied defendant’s motion to dismiss the case under Section 11. At the same time, she granted the motion to dismiss partially (as to claims that Slack misled plaintiffs regarding Slack's scalable architecture), and she also found the statements in the “Key Benefits” portion of Slack's registration statement to be unactionable.

On September 20, 2021, the Ninth Circuit issued a split decision—ultimately overturned, affirming the district court. The dissent, citing established precedent, said that Congress provided for strict liability for issuers in Sections 11 and 12(a)(2), but chose to temper that by "limiting the class of plaintiffs who can sue." The dissent therefore was of the opinion that Sections 11 and 12(a)(2) confer standing only on plaintiffs who purchased securities issued pursuant to the registration statement containing the allegedly false or misleading disclosure.

In December 2022, the U.S. Supreme Court granted certiorari in Pirani v. Slack Technologies, Inc. The U.S. Supreme Court ultimately noted in its unanimous June 2023 decision in Slack Technologies, LLC v. Pirani, No. 22-200, 598 U.S. ___ (2023), that lower federal courts had held since the 1960s that liability under Section 11 of the Securities Act of 1933 attaches "only when a buyer can trace the shares he has purchased to a false or misleading registration statement." It held that "because we think the better reading of the particular provision before us requires a plaintiff to plead and prove that he purchased shares traceable to the allegedly defective registration statement, we vacate the Ninth Circuit’s judgment holding otherwise."

The case was remanded to the Ninth Circuit, which held in 2025 that because the plaintiff previously conceded that he could not make the required showing that the securities that he purchased were traceable to the particular registration statement alleged to be false or misleading, all of his claims failed, and the court consequently reversed the case and remanded with instructions to dismiss the complaint in full and with prejudice.
