= Jen Rubio =

American businesswoman

Jennifer Rubio
- Born: 1986 or 1987 (age 38–39); Philippines
- Education: Pennsylvania State University (dropped out)
- Occupation: Businesswoman
- Known for: Co-founder and former CEO of Away
- Title: Executive chair of Away
- Spouse: Stewart Butterfield (m. 2020)
- Children: 2

Jennifer Rubio (born 1986 or 1987) is an American businesswoman. She is the co-founder, executive chair, and former chief executive officer of Away, a luggage manufacturer and retailer. Rubio was head of social media at Warby Parker and global director of innovation at fashion company AllSaints.

== Early life ==
Rubio was born in the Philippines, and moved to New Jersey when she was seven years old. She grew up traveling, and lived in seven cities on three continents. When she was young, Rubio bought a lemonade stand from another child who lived on her street for $20 which she borrowed from her father. She has called it her first merger and acquisition. Rubio later went on to attend college at Penn State University, where she pursued a supply-chain management major. She was placed at Johnson & Johnson as part of Penn State's co-op program. After discovering her desire to be a businesswoman, Rubio dropped out of Penn State just a few credits shy of graduating, in order to pursue a full-time role at Neutrogena, a company with whom she did another co-op.

== Career ==
In 2011, Rubio joined Warby Parker, leading the company's early content and partnership work as its head of social media. She met Away co-founder Stephanie Korey during her time at Warby Parker. In 2013, she left Warby Parker and went to London, where she was global director of innovation for clothing brand AllSaints. She spent much of a year traveling for the position.

Before Warby Parker, Rubio held different marketing and social media roles, working for brands on the agency side and in-house. She also taught social media as an adjunct professor at Miami Ad School. She has been a guest lecturer at Hyper Island, New York University, Wharton School of the University of Pennsylvania, Northwestern University, and Harvard University.

Rubio co-founded Away, a direct-to-consumer travel and luggage company, with Stephanie Korey, who also worked at Warby Parker. By 2017, Rubio and Korey had raised $31 million, making it one of the largest seed financed female-backed startups. She was CEO of the company from 2021 to 2025, when she transitioned to the role of executive chair.

== Personal life ==
In May 2019, Rubio got engaged to her boyfriend, Slack CEO Stewart Butterfield. They married in 2020 and share two children. On August 5, 2026, Rubio and Stewart posted a collaboration post on Instagram stating they were separating.
