= Away (company) =

American travel and lifestyle brand

JRSK, Inc.
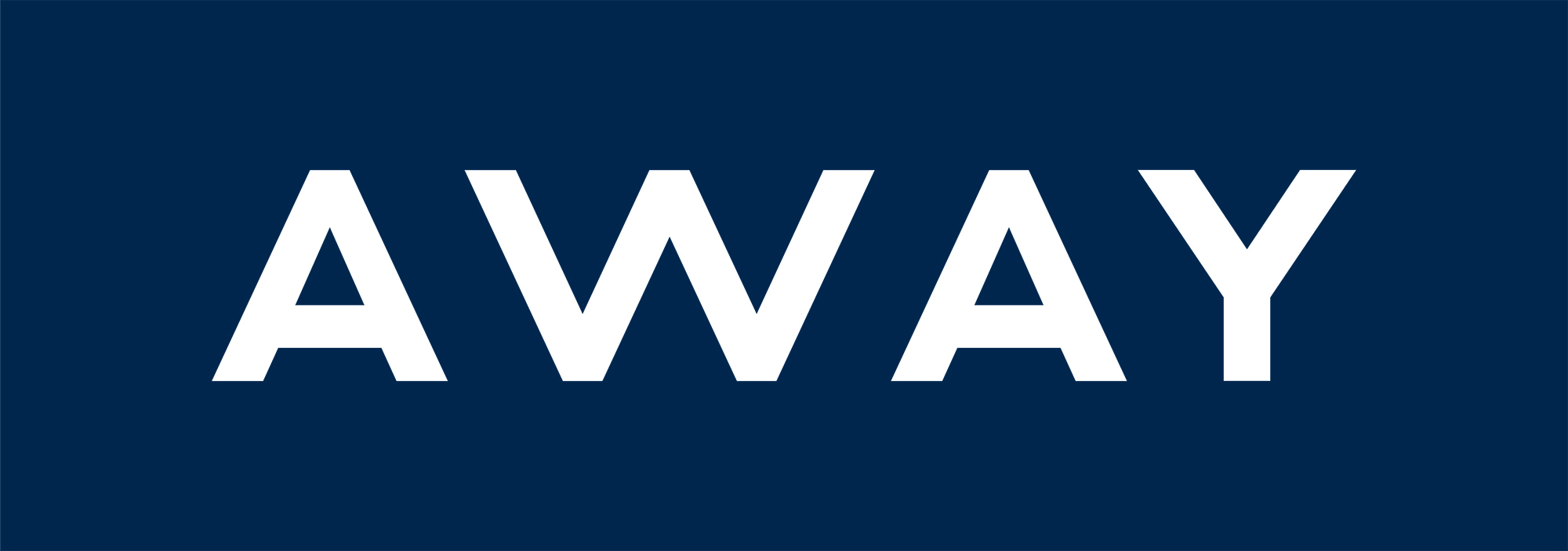
- Trade name: Away
- Type: Private
- Industry: Retail
- Founded: November 9, 2015; 10 years ago
- Founders: Steph Korey; Jen Rubio
- Headquarters: New York City, New York, U.S.
- Key people: Jen Rubio (executive chair); Jessica Schinazi (CEO)
- Products: Baggage; travel accessories
- Revenue: ▲$150+ Million
- Number of employees: 200
- Website: awaytravel.com

Away is an American luggage and travel accessories brand founded by Jen Rubio and Steph Korey in 2015 and based in Lower Manhattan, New York. Away raised $216 million in financing and is one of the highest funded woman-backed startups.

The company primarily sells products online, but also has brick and mortar locations. Away is a direct-to-consumer retailer, so the company bypasses third-party wholesalers or distributors. Its products are available for purchase in the U.S., Canada and the U.K.

== History ==
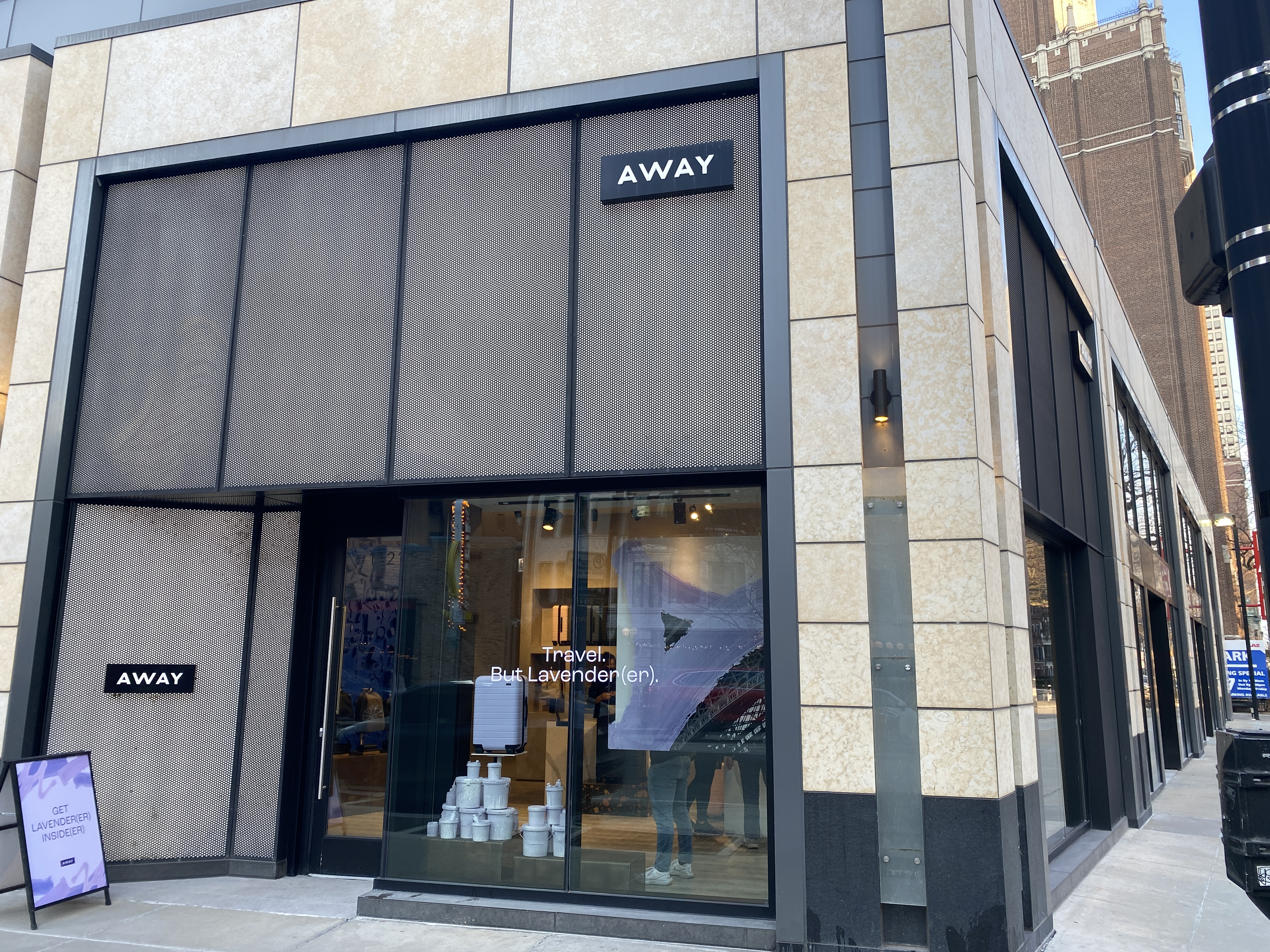
Chicago store at 1121 North State Street in the Gold Coast district

Steph Korey and Jen Rubio met in 2011 as former colleagues on the early executive team at Warby Parker. They founded Away in 2015. It improved upon traditional suitcase designs by adding features like built-in batteries in their luggage for charging mobile devices. By November, the company had raised $2.5 million in seed funding from investors Accel Partners and Forerunner Ventures. The company's first product, a carry-on became available to ship in February 2016. In September 2016, the company raised an additional $8.5 million in Series A funding for expansion.

In November 2016 Steph Korey was listed on Forbes 30 Under 30, a pick the publication regretted in 2023, placing Korey on its Hall of Shame, featuring 10 picks it wished it could take back. By 2024, the firm had grown to 66 employees and projected more than $50 million in sales. It raised $20 million in Series B funding led by Global Founders Capital, Forerunner Ventures, Comcast Ventures, and Accel Partners in May 2017. As of May 2018, it had more than 150 employees and announced plans to expand jobs across the company, including moving its headquarters in Manhattan. In May 2019, it secured $100 million of investment and reached a total valuation of $1.4 billion. The funding round was led by Wellington Management, as well as Baillie Gifford, Lone Pine Capital and Global Founders Capital. The money was intended for building brick-and-mortar stores and expanding travel gear.

Away expanded into editorial content with the launch of a podcast called Airplane Mode in May 2017, and in July 2017, a print and digital travel magazine, Here, which includes city guides, travel essays, and photo journals. The company was named a "Breakthrough Brand with Ingenious Marketing" by Adweek. Fast Company recognized Away as being one of the "2018 Top 10 Most Innovative Companies", and the company was a recipient of Surface Travel Awards.

=== Toxic workplace allegations ===
On December 5, 2019, a report by The Verge reporter Zoë Schiffer described a toxic workplace and "culture of intimidation and constant surveillance" at Away in which employee communications channels were restricted while executives used Slack as an internal megaphone to publicly humiliate employees. Employees reported expectations to work long hours, on holidays, at night and late into the evening, and without paid time off. In an apology, Korey, the CEO, said that she was "appalled" to read her own messages and listed steps taken to improve the company's work culture in the last year. Korey initially resigned as CEO on December 9, and the company announced that she would be succeeded by Stuart Haselden, former COO of Lululemon.

Korey renounced her resignation on January 13, 2020, and said that she and Haselden would be co-CEOs of Away. In an interview with The New York Times, Korey said that The Verge's reporting was "inaccurate" and that it was "not right" for her to resign. The Verge replied, "Steph Korey responding to our reporting by saying her behavior and comments were 'wrong, plain and simple' and then choosing to step down as C.E.O. speaks for itself." Erin Grau, Away's human resources chief, resigned the same day in response to Korey returning. On July 2, 2020, however, Rubio and Haseldon announced that Korey would be stepping down as co-CEO "within the year", after comments she made on social media attacking digital-only media companies. Away employees were concerned that her comments meant she had learned nothing from the events in December 2019.

== Products ==
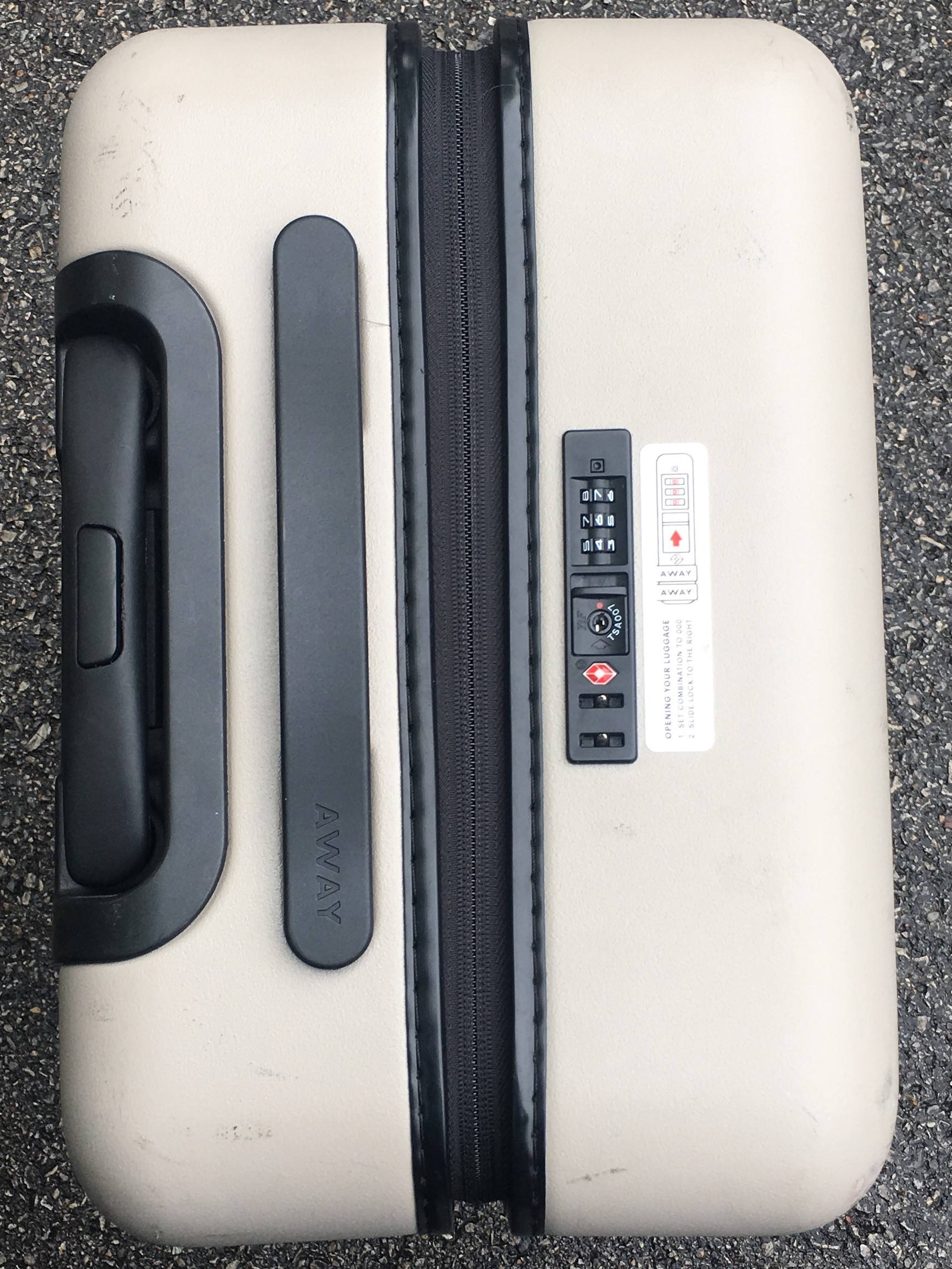
Carry-On from the top

Away produces and markets travel accessories using a direct-to-consumer business model. The company's best-known products are suitcases. Away's product line includes travel bags, travel organizers, and travel accessories.

The Carry-On was developed based on focus group feedback. Vogue announced the creation of the luggage in November 2015, labeling it "The Perfect Carry-On." By October 2016, Away had launched three additional sizes: The Bigger Carry-On; The Medium; and The Large. The Bigger Carry-On was an honoree in the 2017 Fast Company Innovation By Design Awards. Due to the brand's celebrity appeal, People dubbed the luggage "the little black dress of luggage" in August 2017.
