= Cocosolis =

Bulgarian cosmetics company

COCOSOLIS
- Type: Private
- Industry: Cosmetics
- Founded: 2016
- Founder: Plamen Stefanov & Betty Bencheve
- Headquarters: Sofia, Bulgaria
- Products: Sun and Tanning Products, Skin and Body Care Products, Hair Care Products
- Website: https://cocosolis.com

Cocosolis is a Bulgarian cosmetics company that develops skin and hair care products formulated with natural and organic ingredients. Headquartered in Sofia, Bulgaria, the company distributes its products internationally and has reported sales in nearly 30 countries.

== History ==
Cocosolis was founded in 2016, by Plamen Stefanov and Betty Bencheva. Prior to establishing a cosmetics brand, the founders were involved in organic agriculture, cultivating fruits and vegetables, and developing food products such as kale chips and nutritional supplements.

The concept of Cocosolis emerged in January 2016 when Bencheva proposed creating a cosmetics brand that combined natural ingredients with cosmetic formulations. Following this, the founders shifted their operations from food production to cosmetics.

The company's initial portfolio consisted of four tanning, body, and hair oils formulated using organic, cold pressed oils and packaged in recyclable materials. From its inception, Cocosolis adopted a direct-to-consumer (D2C) e-commerce model, primarily targeting international markets. According to founders, approximately 90% of its revenue is generated from exports in France, Romania, Greece, Spain, and Portugal serving as its primary markets.

== Products ==
The products range include organic sun and tanning products, facial skincare, body care, and hair care products.
