= Atlassian =

Australian software company

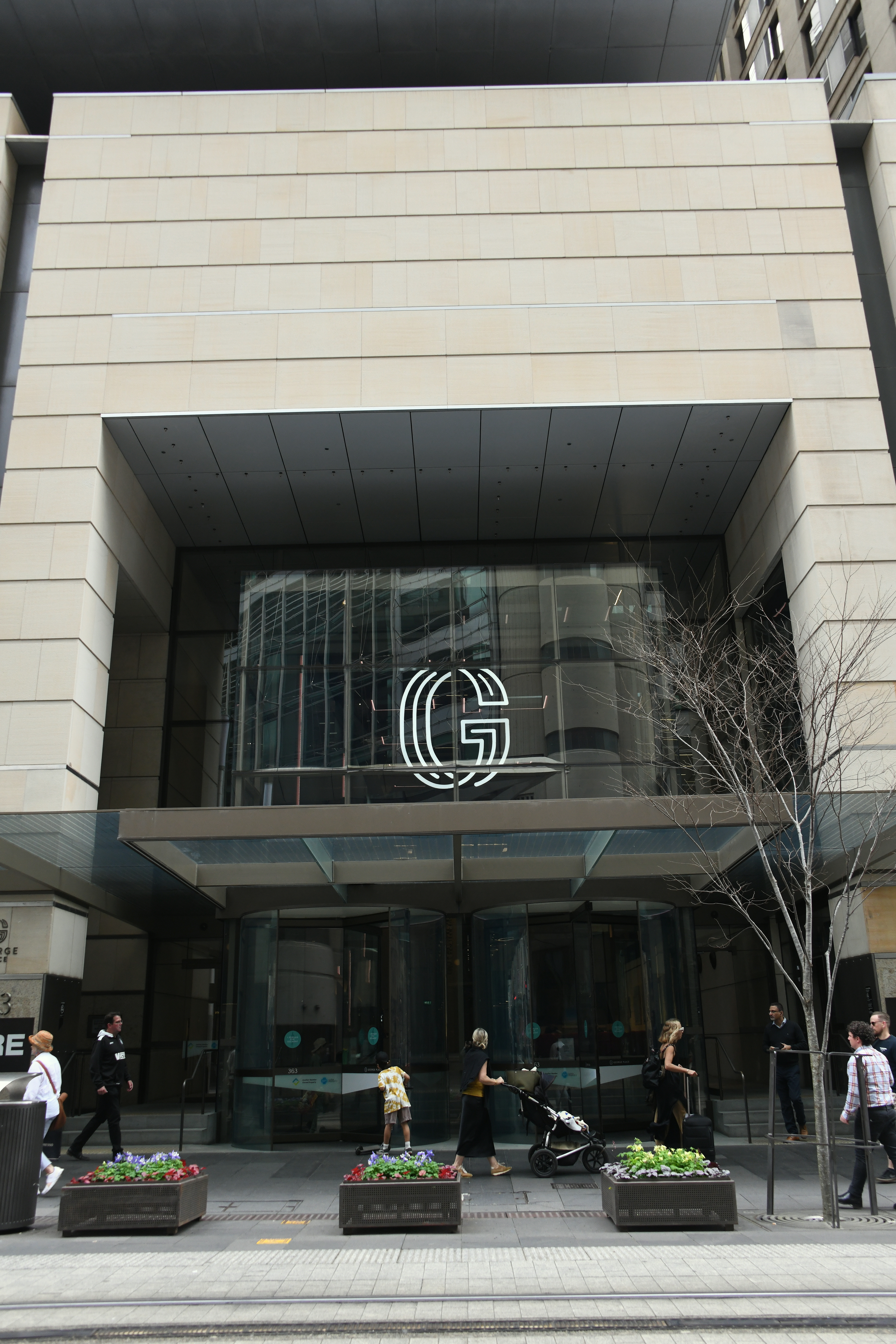
- George Place in Sydney, Atlassian's Global HQ
- Type: Public
- Traded as: Nasdaq: TEAM (Class A); Russell 1000 component
- ISIN: US0494681010
- Industry: Software
- Founded: 2002; 24 years ago in Sydney
- Founders: Mike Cannon-Brookes; Scott Farquhar
- Headquarters: Sydney, New South Wales, Australia
- Key people: Shona Brown (chair); Mike Cannon-Brookes (CEO)
- Products: Jira; Confluence; Hipchat/Stride (discontinued); Bitbucket/Bitbucket Server; Fisheye (discontinued); Crucible (discontinued); Trello; Loom
- Revenue: ▲US$5.22 billion (2025)
- Operating income: ▼US$−130 million (2025)
- Net income: ▲US$−257 million (2025)
- Total assets: ▲US$6.04 billion (2025)
- Total equity: ▲US$1.35 billion (2025)
- Owners: Mike Cannon-Brookes (20%); Scott Farquhar (20%)
- Number of employees: 13,813 (2025)
- Parent: Atlassian Corporation
- Subsidiaries: The Browser Company
- Website: atlassian.com

Atlassian (/ətˈlæsiən/) is a multinational proprietary software company headquartered in Sydney, Australia, that specialises in collaboration tools designed primarily for software development and project management.

Founded in Sydney in 2002, the company has over 12,000 employees across 14 countries. Atlassian currently serves over 300,000 customers in over 200 countries and territories around the world.

Atlassian maintains its global headquarters in Sydney, alongside a secondary US hub in San Francisco. In 2013, the group established UK-registered Atlassian Corporation Plc as its parent entity. In 2022, the group completed a corporate reorganisation, establishing a US-domiciled parent holding company, Atlassian Corporation - incorporated in Delaware, to replace the UK entity.

== History ==
In 2001, Mike Cannon-Brookes sent an email to his University of New South Wales classmates asking if any of them were interested in helping him launch a tech startup after graduation. Scott Farquhar was the only one who replied, and together they founded Atlassian in 2002. They bootstrapped the company for several years, financing the startup with a $10,000 credit card debt. The name was derived from the Greek mythological figure Atlas, inspired by his bronze statue in New York's Rockefeller Center.

Initially, Cannon-Brookes and Farquhar were engaged in supporting other customer service teams, which required them to be available for calls at all hours. They were also unhappy with the bug-tracking software they were using at the time. To solve these issues, they developed Atlassian's flagship product, Jira, a project and issue tracking tool, and shifted their focus to selling this software. Then, in 2004, Atlassian launched its team collaboration platform named Confluence.

In July 2010, Atlassian raised $60 million in secondaries venture capital from Accel Partners. By June of the next year it announced that revenue had increased 35% in the previous year to $102 million.

In July 2012, Doug Burgum became chairman of its board of directors.

In 2013, Atlassian announced a Jira service desk product with full service-level agreement support.

A 2014 restructuring saw the parent company become Atlassian Corporation PLC of the UK, whose address was registered in London, though the de facto headquarters remained in Sydney.

In November 2015, Atlassian announced sales of $320 million, and Shona Brown was added to its board. On 10 December 2015, Atlassian made its initial public offering (IPO) on the NASDAQ stock exchange, under the symbol TEAM, putting the market capitalisation of Atlassian at $4.37 billion. The IPO made its founders Farquhar and Cannon-Brookes Australia's first tech startup billionaires and household names in their native country, despite Atlassian being called a "very boring software company" in The New York Times for its focus on development and management software.

In March 2019, Atlassian's value was US$26.6 billion. Cannon-Brookes and Farquhar own approximately 30% each. In October 2020, Atlassian announced the end of support for its "Server" products with sales ending in February 2021 and support ending in February 2024 to focus on "Cloud" and "Data Centre" editions.

In October 2021, Atlassian received approval to construct its new headquarters in Sydney, which will anchor the Tech Central precinct. Their building is planned to be the world's tallest hybrid timber structure and will embody leading sustainability technologies and principles.

In March 2023, the firm announced layoffs of 500 employees, or 5% of its workforce. In October 2023, Microsoft identified a severe zero-day vulnerability that can be exploited remotely and anonymously in Atlassian's Confluence product. It also accused Chinese state-backed group known as Storm-0062, DarkShadow, or Oro0lxy, of breaking into Atlassian customers' systems several weeks earlier. Atlassian asked its customers to look for signs of a breach, as it could not itself confirm whether its systems were affected. The flaw has since been fixed via an update that the customers would need to apply.

At the end of August 2024, Farquhar stepped down as co-CEO, leaving Cannon-Brookes as the sole CEO of the company. Farquhar remains on the board and as a special adviser.

In March 2026, Atlassian announced that it would lay off around 10% of its workforce to pivot into artificial intelligence and enterprise sales.

=== 2019 data leak ===
In July 2019, cybersecurity researcher Sam Jadali exposed a catastrophic data leak known as DataSpii involving clickstream data provider DDMR and marketing intelligence company Nacho Analytics (NA). Branding itself as the "God mode for the internet", NA granted its free and paid members the ability to access real-time Jira and Confluence data from Atlassian's cloud and on-premises products, impacting thousands of Atlassian customers including Reddit, FireEye, NBC Digital, BuzzFeed, AlienVault, Cardinal Health, T-Mobile, and Under Armour.

Ars Technica's coverage of Jadali's findings highlighted DataSpii's ability to disseminate sensitive Atlassian Jira data, including Blue Origin staff's competitor discussions and technical issues with sensors, equipment and manifolds.

DataSpii circumvented the most effective security measures, enabling the unauthorised dissemination of Jira data from the internal corporate networks of leading cybersecurity firms. This resulted in the real-time leakage of Jira tickets containing the cybersecurity issues of entities such as the Pentagon, Bank of America, AT&T and others. Jadali's investigation revealed that DDMR facilitated rapid dissemination of the data to additional third parties, often within minutes of acquisition, endangering the privacy of the sensitive data collected.

== Sales model ==
Atlassian operates under the principle that "software should be bought, not sold". Instead of running a traditional sales team, they opted to build a self-service purchase experience. This was considered risky in the early 2000s, but the strategy worked better than expected when they awoke one morning to an order form from American Airlines in the fax machine. While a majority of sales are made through their website, Atlassian also runs a partner program where solution partners not only provide knowledge about Atlassian products but can also assist with product implementation and configuration depending on their partner classification.

== Acquisitions and product announcements ==
Additional products include Crucible, FishEye, Bamboo and Clover, which target programmers working with a code base. FishEye, Crucible and Clover came into Atlassian's portfolio by acquiring another Australian software company, Cenqua, in 2007. In 2010, Atlassian acquired Bitbucket, a hosted service for code collaboration. In 2011, Atlassian acquired SourceTree, a client for Git and Mercurial distributed version control systems and Subversion source control.

In 2012, Atlassian acquired HipChat, an instant messenger for workplace environments. In May 2012, Atlassian introduced an app marketplace to offer plug-ins for Atlassian products. That same year Atlassian also released Stash, a Git repository for enterprises, later renamed Bitbucket Server.

In May 2015, the company announced its acquisition of work chat company Hall, intending to migrate all of Hall's customers across to HipChat. In April 2015, Atlassian announced that it had acquired Blue Jimp—the company behind Jitsi—to expand its video capabilities.

In July 2016, Atlassian acquired Dogwood Labs and its product StatusPage that inform customers during outages and maintenance.

In January 2017, Atlassian announced the purchase of Trello for $425 million. On 7 September 2017, the company launched Stride, a web chat alternative to Slack. Less than a year later, on 26 July 2018, Atlassian announced it was going to exit the chat business, that it had sold the intellectual property for HipChat and Stride to competitor Slack Technologies, and that it was going to shut down HipChat and Stride in 2019. As part of the deal, Atlassian took a small stake in Slack.

On 4 September 2018, the company acquired OpsGenie, a helpdesk ticket notification system, for $295 million. In October 2018, the company announced that it was selling Jitsi to 8x8.

On 18 March 2019, the company announced that it had acquired Agilecraft for $166 million. On 17 October 2019, Atlassian completed the acquisition of Code Barrel, makers of "Automation for Jira", available on Jira Marketplace.

On 12 May 2020, Atlassian acquired Halp, a tool that generates helpdesk tickets from Slack conversations, for an undisclosed amount. On 30 July 2020, Atlassian announced the acquisition of Mindville, a provider of IT service management software, for an undisclosed amount.

On 26 February 2021, Atlassian acquired the cloud-based visualisation and analytics company Chartio.

On 19 April 2023, Atlassian announced a set of new features, branded as "Atlassian Intelligence", which integrate technology from OpenAI. In October 2023, Atlassian agreed to buy video messaging company Loom for US$975 million, with the intention to integrate Loom's technology into its services. In October, Atlassian announced the acquisition of "AirTrack", a data and asset management tool.

In April 2024, Atlassian released Rovo, a set of search and automation tools that use AI. On 29 August 2024, Atlassian acquired the meeting recorder company Rewatch.

On 3 September 2025, Atlassian announced its acquisition of Cycle App Inc. The following day, Atlassian announced its acquisition of The Browser Company, the company behind the Dia and soon to be discontinued Arc browser.

In September 2025, Atlassian announced it was acquiring the developer productivity company DX for US$1 billion. This acquisition was completed in January 2026.

In January 2026, Atlassian acquired data catalog company Secoda.

== Sponsorship ==
In February 2025, Williams Racing announced a record multi-year title sponsorship with Atlassian and will compete as Atlassian Williams Racing from the 2025 season of Formula One onwards.
