= Stewart Butterfield =

Canadian entrepreneur and businessman (born 1973)

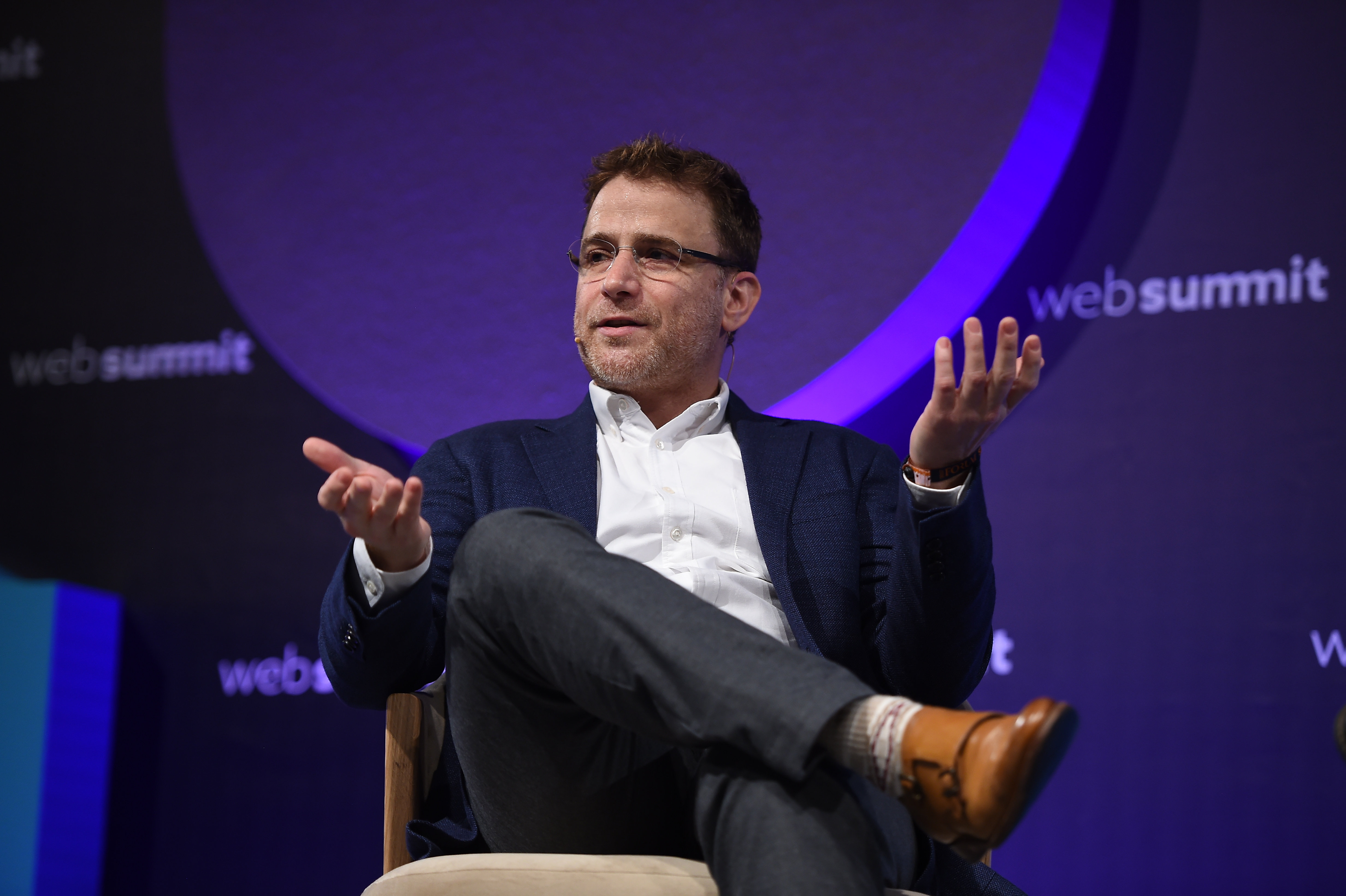
- Butterfield in 2017
- Born: Dharma Jeremy Butterfield; March 21, 1973 (age 53); Lund, British Columbia, Canada
- Education: University of Victoria (BA); Clare College, Cambridge (MA)
- Occupation: Businessman
- Known for: Co-founder of Flickr; Founder and former CEO of Slack
- Spouses: Caterina Fake (m. 2001; div. 2007); Jen Rubio (m. 2020)
- Children: 3

Daniel Stewart Butterfield (born Dharma Jeremy Butterfield on March 21, 1973) is a Canadian billionaire businessman, best known for co-founding the photo-sharing website Flickr and the team-messaging application Slack.

== Early life and education ==
In 1973, Butterfield was born in Lund, British Columbia. For the first five years of his life he grew up in a log cabin without running water or electricity. His family lived on a commune in remote Canada after his father fled the US to avoid being drafted for the Vietnam War. His family moved to Victoria when Butterfield was five years old. As a child, Butterfield taught himself how to code, and changed his name to Stewart when he was 12.

Butterfield was educated at St. Michaels University School in Victoria, British Columbia, and made money in university designing websites. He received a B.A. degree in philosophy from the University of Victoria in 1996 and went on to earn a Master of Philosophy from Clare College, Cambridge, in 1998. His thesis was on scientific thinkers of the 19th century.

== Career ==
In 2000, Butterfield worked with Jason Classon to build a startup called Gradfinder.com. Following Gradfinder.com's acquisition, he worked as a freelance web designer. Butterfield also created a contest called the 5K competition, centered on people with the ability to design websites under 5 kilobytes.

=== Ludicorp and Flickr ===
In the summer of 2002, he co-founded Ludicorp with Caterina Fake and Jason Classon in Vancouver. Ludicorp initially developed a massively multiplayer online role-playing game called Game Neverending. After the game failed to launch, the company started a photo-sharing website called Flickr. In March 2005, Ludicorp was acquired by Yahoo!, where Butterfield continued as the General Manager of Flickr until he left Yahoo! on July 12, 2008.

=== Tiny Speck ===
In 2009, Butterfield co-founded a new company called Tiny Speck. Tiny Speck launched its first project, the massively multiplayer game Glitch, on September 27, 2011. Glitch was later closed due to its failure to attract a sufficiently large audience. The game world closed down on December 9, 2012, but the website remained online. In January 2013, the company announced that it would make the most of the game's art available under a Creative Commons license. On December 9, 2014, a fan project to relaunch Glitch under the name Eleven began alpha testing.

=== Slack ===
In August 2013, Butterfield announced the release of Slack, an instant-message-based team communication tool, built by Tiny Speck while working on Glitch. After its public release in February 2014, the tool grew at a weekly rate of 5 to 10 percent, with more than 120,000 daily users registered in the first week of August. In early 2014, the data for Slack's first six-month usage period showed that nearly 16,000 users were registered without any advertising.

That same year, Butterfield secured an office for Slack employees in San Francisco, and was expected to commence recruitment during the second half of the year.

As of December 2015, Slack had raised US$340 million in venture capital and had more than 2 million daily active users, of which 570,000 were paying customers.

Slack was named Inc. Magazine’s 2015 company of the year.

In June 2019, the company announced its initial public offering with an opening price of $38.50 and a market capitalization of US$21.4 billion.

In December 2020, Salesforce confirmed plans to buy Slack Technologies for US$27.7 billion.

In December 2022, Butterfield announced his departure as CEO of Slack and left Salesforce early in January 2023.

== Awards and honors ==
In 2005, Butterfield was named one of Businessweek's "Top 50" Leaders in the entrepreneur category. In the same year, he was also named in the TR35, a list collated by MIT in its MIT Technology Review publication, as one of the top 35 innovators in the world under the age of 35 years. In 2006, he was named in the "Time 100", Time magazine's list of the 100 most influential people in the world, and also appeared on the cover of Newsweek magazine.

In November 2008, Butterfield received the "Legacy Distinguished Alumni Award" from the University of Victoria.

In 2015, Stewart was named the Wall Street Journal's Technology Innovator for 2015, awarded TechCrunch’s Founder of the Year Crunchie, and included in Vanity Fair's New Establishment, Advertising Age's Creative 50, and Details’ Digital Mavericks lists.

In May 2017, he was featured in Masters of Scale, a podcast series by Reid Hoffman, co-founder of Linkedin, along with other successful businesspeople such as Mark Zuckerberg, John Elkann, and Brian Chesky. In it, he discussed the scaling strategy adopted by Slack.

== Personal life ==
Butterfield was married to Caterina Fake, his Flickr co-founder, from 2001 to 2007. They have one child together, who was born on July 11, 2007. In May 2019 he became engaged to Jennifer Rubio, co-founder of Away Luggage. They married the next year and have a son and a daughter together. On April 21, 2024, it was thought that Butterfield's 16-year-old child had run away from home, but she was found alive on April 29, and a 26-year-old man was arrested for abduction. On August 5, 2026, Rubio and Stewart posted a collaboration post on Instagram stating they were separating.
