= Neil Blumenthal =

American entrepreneur and co-founder of Warby Parker

- Born: August 7, 1980 (age 46)
- Education: Tufts University (BA); The Wharton School of the University of Pennsylvania (MBA)
- Occupation: Businessman
- Title: Co-founder/co-CEO, Warby Parker
- Spouse: Rachel Blumenthal
- Children: 2

Neil Blumenthal (born August 7, 1980) is an American entrepreneur and the co-CEO and co-founder of Warby Parker, an American eyewear brand and retailer of prescription glasses, contact lenses, and sunglasses. The company also offers eye exams.

Blumenthal runs Warby Parker alongside co-founder and co-CEO Dave Gilboa, a longtime friend he met in college.

== Early life and education ==
Neil Blumenthal was born and raised in New York City. He earned a bachelor's degree in history and international relations from Tufts University in 2002, and an MBA from The Wharton School of the University of Pennsylvania in 2010.

Blumenthal's mother worked as a nurse and his father was an international tax consultant. Both of Blumenthal's grandfathers were entrepreneurs.

== Career ==
After graduating from Tufts University, Blumenthal was briefly employed by International Crisis Group before joining VisionSpring in 2003 as the organization's director. Blumenthal went to work for VisionSpring after learning from the organization's founder, Manhattan-based eye doctor Jordan Kassalow, that a billion people don't have access to glasses.

Warby Parker

After five years at VisionSpring, where he spent time working in El Salvador and 10 other countries, Blumenthal left and enrolled in an MBA program at The Wharton School. Realizing the need for affordable eyewear from their own experiences, Blumenthal and classmate Dave Gilboa came up with the idea for Warby Parker while attending Wharton. In 2010, Blumenthal launched the company alongside Gilboa, Andrew Hunt, and Jeffrey Raider from a Philadelphia apartment, with its headquarters established in Blumenthal's hometown of New York City.

Blumenthal and the other co-founders considered 2,000 names for the company before choosing Warby Parker, which combined two names they found in author Jack Keroac's diaries. Blumenthal and the other co-founders tested the name "Warby Parker" with around 1,500 of their friends, getting a largely positive reaction.

Originally, Warby Parker sold eyewear exclusively online as a way to cut costs for consumers. Within a month of starting the company, Blumenthal and the other co-founders sold out their top 15 styles of glasses and had more than 20,000 people on a waitlist. The company opened its first brick-and-mortar store in 2013. In 2015, Fast Company named Warby Parker the World's Most Innovative Company for "building the first great made-on-the-internet brand." In 2021, Warby Parker became a publicly traded company through a direct listing on the New York Stock Exchange.

Upon its founding, Blumenthal also helped establish the company's "Buy a Pair, Give a Pair" program, in which a pair of glasses was distributed to someone in need for every pair purchased. The program has distributed over 20 million pairs of glasses in more than 80 countries as of September 2025.

Under Blumenthal's leadership, Warby Parker released its first-ever kids’ line of glasses in January 2018. In July 2021, the company introduced a Virtual Vision Test app that allowed users to update eyeglass and contact lens prescriptions from an iPhone. In May 2026, Warby Parker revealed its first pair of Google-and-Samsung-powered smart glasses, set for a fall 2026 release.

== Recognition and philanthropy ==
In 2012, Blumenthal was named a Young Global Leader by the World Economic Forum. That same year, he was named one of the 100 Most Creative People in Business by Fast Company. In 2013, he received the Entrepreneur of the Year award from Ernst & Young and was recognized by Vanity Fair as part of "The Next Establishment."

In 2015, Blumenthal led Warby Parker in creating Pupils Project, a program that works with local organizations and government agencies to provide free glasses, vision screenings, and eye exams for school-aged children.

Blumenthal was a commencement speaker at Northeastern University in 2017 and delivered a commencement address at both of his alma maters: Tufts University (in 2022 for the class of 2020) and The Wharton School of the University of Pennsylvania (in 2015).

Blumenthal helped launch the Warby Parker Impact Foundation in 2019 to boost the company's "Buy a Pair, Give a Pair" program.

== Board memberships and other ventures ==
Blumenthal is a board member with the United Nations Foundation Global Entrepreneurs Council and RxART, a nonprofit that commissions and installs art in children's hospitals. In July 2023, Blumenthal was named co-chair of the board at the Partnership Fund for New York City, the investment arm of the Partnership for New York City. Blumenthal has served on the Partnership Fund board since 2019.

Blumenthal has also been a board member for Allbirds, Sweetgreen Investor Relations, and the Warby Parker Impact Foundation, and has been on advisory boards for Responsible Innovation Labs and the Mayor's Fund to Advance New York City. Blumenthal is on the leadership council of Tech:NYC and on the board of directors for Robin Hood.

Blumenthal co-founded and is a general partner of Good Friends LLC, an early-stage venture capital and investment firm.

== Personal life ==
Blumenthal married his wife, Rachel, in 2008. The couple met as freshmen at Tufts University and has two children. Rachel Blumenthal is an entrepreneur who has built several businesses, including Rockets of Awesome, a subscription-based children's clothing company she launched in 2016.

The Blumenthals' apartment in the Greenwich Village area of New York City was featured in Architectural Digest in May 2017.
