= Public offering without listing =

Form of public equity offering by non-Japanese firms

A public offering without listing, often called a POWL deal or a POWL, is a form of public equity offering by non-Japanese firms in the Japanese market, without the previously required simultaneous listing on a local exchange such as the Tokyo Stock Exchange.

== History ==
Prior to 1989, non-Japanese firms that wanted to sell equity into the Japanese market via public offering were required to list on a local Japanese stock exchange. Changes in regulations introduced in 1989 allowed this form of a public offering by foreign companies published, audited financial statements and with stock that is (or will be) listed on a foreign stock exchange which satisfies the requirements of the Japanese Financial Services Agency (FSA).

== Notable POWL issuance ==
Equity offerings via POWL have been a common part of Asia regional public offerings since the early 1990s, with Japanese investors often taking more than 20% of the offering through this format. ICBC and Bank of China (Hong Kong) used this format to allow their domestic public offerings to spread into Japan.

== See also ==
- Alternative public offering
- PIPE deal
