= Direct-to-consumer =

Sale of products directly to customers bypassing middlemen

Direct-to-consumer (DTC or D2C) is a modern variation of the business-to-consumer (B2C) business model. The DTC is a business model of selling products directly to customers and thereby bypassing any third-party retailers, wholesalers, or intermediaries. Direct-to-consumer sales are usually transacted online, but direct-to-consumer brands may also operate physical retail spaces as a complement to their main e-commerce platform in a clicks-and-mortar business model. In the year 2021, direct-to-consumer e-commerce sales in the United States were over $128 billion. Examples of DTC brands currently in business include: Allbirds, Away, Dollar Shave Club, Everlane, Glossier, and Warby Parker.

== History ==
Direct-to-consumer became immensely popular during the dot-com bubble of the late 1990s, when it primarily referred to online retailers that sold products and services to consumers over the Internet.

This business model originated before modern transportation and electricity when people consumed locally due to geographical distance, and business competition was more limited.

As new modes of transport emerged—such as steamboats, trains, automobiles, and airplanes—consumers gained access to a wider variety of goods and service providers, increasing business competition.

The emergence of the Internet further increased access to many different types of goods and services, and increased competition meant that businesses had to put additional effort into winning and keeping customers.

In the pharmaceutical industry, strong demand for anti-obesity medications following the rise of GLP-1 drugs prompted Eli Lilly and Novo Nordisk to develop direct-to-consumer platforms.

== Advantages and disadvantages ==
Direct-to-consumer e-commerce enjoys lower costs compared to physical retail, as it has reduced the number of different business components like employees, purchasing costs, mailing confirmation, and renting or establishing a physical store.

The model enables smaller companies to compete with large and successful companies in terms of price, availability of the products, and quality, since costs are lower. Direct-to-consumer sales can drive stronger brand loyalty and customer retention.

The primary risks in the online direct-to-consumer model include increasing liability, cybersecurity threats, and growing supply chain demands. DTC exposes a business to tasks that would otherwise be taken up by wholesalers and retailers, such as shipping, labeling, and cybersecurity. Data privacy and cybersecurity are especially important in online businesses. Accepting online payments can make DTC businesses a target for hackers and cybercriminals, exposing them to the risks of fraudulent payments and false chargebacks. The direct-to-consumer business model puts the entire burden of the supply chain onto the firm itself; rather than selling to only a few distributors, the products must be delivered to many individual customers.

== In Brazil ==
In Brazil, the direct-to-consumer (D2C) model has shown significant growth, driven by retail digitalization and changing consumer habits. While in more mature markets, such as the United States, direct sales account for approximately 15% of industry revenue, the Brazilian market share is currently around 5%, indicating a substantial margin for expansion.

The adoption of D2C in the Brazilian ecosystem has accelerated the emergence of digital native vertical brands (DNVBs), such as Insider Store, Liv Up, and Sallve. These startups build their value chains focused entirely on direct online sales, bypassing traditional intermediaries. Concurrently, established national industries across various sectors have been adapting their logistics and technological infrastructures to operate directly in e-commerce, aiming for greater control over the customer journey and the retention of first-party data.

== See also ==
- Retail – Sale of goods and services
- Disintermediation – Eliminating middlemen from supply chain
- Consumer-to-business – Business model
- Over-the-top media service – Service delivering video and audio over the Internet
- Marketing channel – Resources for getting products to the consumer
- Wholesale fashion distribution – Global market of bulk clothing sales
- Types of e-commerce
- Direct-to-consumer automobile selling in the United States
