= Shona Brown =

American businesswoman

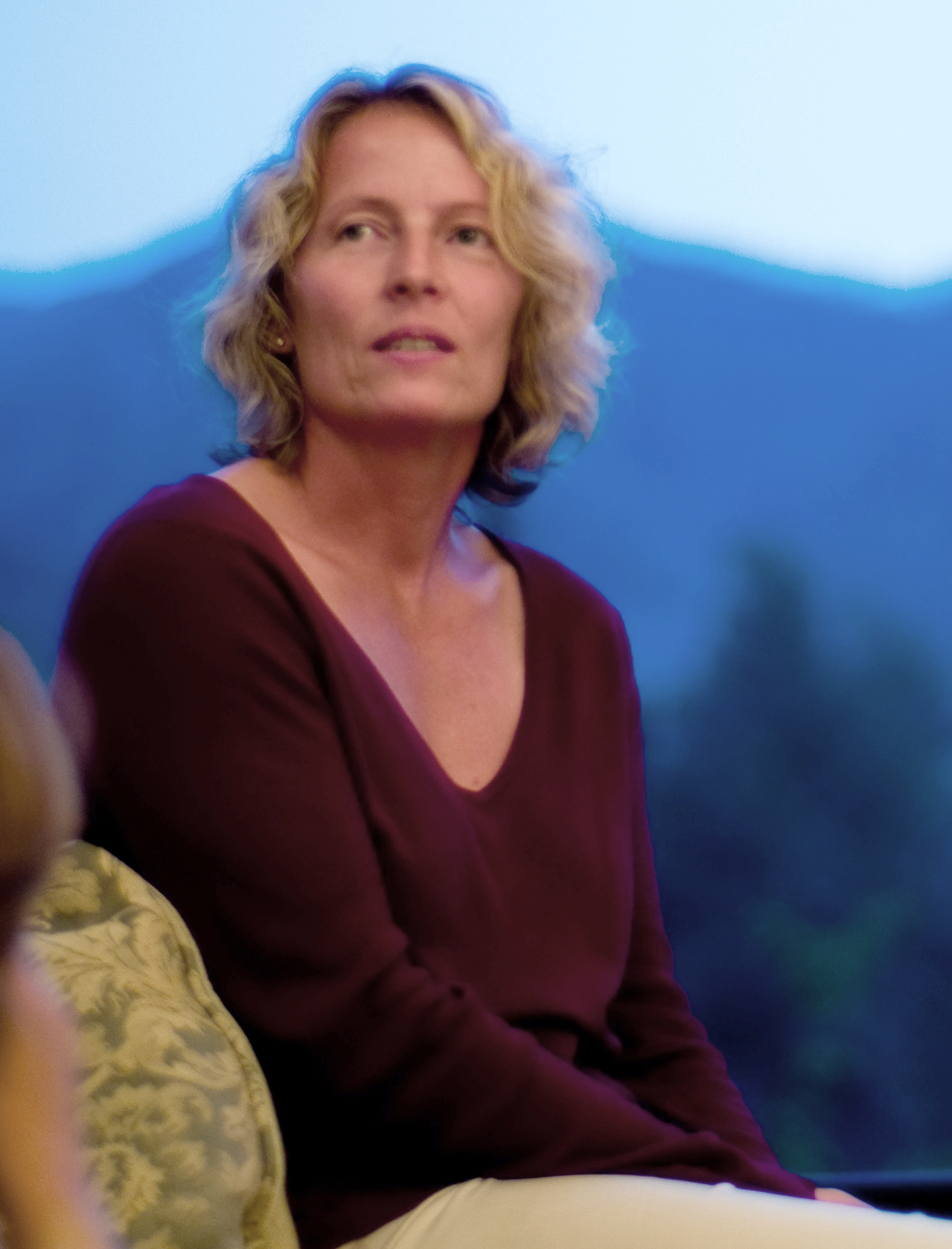
Shona Brown in 2007

Shona L. Brown (born c. 1966) is a business executive and consultant to non-profits and corporations. She was an executive at Google from 2003 to 2012, where she was senior vice president of business operations.

== Life ==
Brown has a bachelor of computer systems engineering from Carleton University in Canada and a master's degree in economics and philosophy from the University of Oxford as a Rhodes Scholar. Brown received her Ph.D from Stanford University's department of industrial engineering and engineering management, where she also did postdoctoral work on business theory.

From October 1995 to August 2003, Brown was at McKinsey & Company, a management consulting firm, as a partner in the Los Angeles office since December 2000. In 1998, she published the book Competing on the Edge: Strategy as Structured Chaos, with co-author Kathleen M. Eisenhardt, her doctoral advisor at Stanford.

Brown joined Google in September 2003 and took on the responsibility of building both the people operations and business operations groups. In January 2006, she was promoted to senior vice president, and CNN included Brown as one of four rising stars in their most powerful women in business section, as a journalist called her Google's "chief chaos officer", testing her business theories at the company. In October 2007 she was involved with an illegal non-solicitation compact to not poach engineers from Apple Inc.

Fortune ranked Brown the sixth highest paid woman in 2010, with over $16 million in total compensation. Effective April 13, 2011, Brown kept her title of senior vice president for Google, but business operations and human resources were moved under chief financial officer Patrick Pichette. She became a senior vice president for the Google.org charitable group (following Megan Smith) from April 2011 to December 2012. In early 2013, she stepped down to become an advisor to Google and other companies.

In November 2015, she joined the board of Atlassian.

Shona Brown is currently serving as consultant/board member for a portfolio of corporate technology start-ups including Xperiel, Betterworks, ClearStoryData, Candor Inc, and Paperless Post.

Brown is a director of the non-profit organizations such as Knight Foundation, San Francisco Jazz Organization, the Bridgespan Group, the Nature Conservancy, the Center for Advanced Study in Behavioral Sciences at Stanford, the Exploratorium, and Code for America. Brown also served on the board of PepsiCo.
