= Loom, Inc. =

American software company

- Type: Private
- Industry: Technology
- Founded: 2015; 11 years ago
- Founders: Vinay Hiremath; Shahed Khan; Joe Thomas
- Headquarters: San Francisco, California, US
- Products: Communication software
- Parent: Atlassian (2023–present)
- Website: loom.com

Loom, Inc. is a technology company that provides video communication software for work. Its technology includes screen and camera recording, video editing, transcription, and the ability to share the recorded video link with others.

In 2022, according to Forbes, the firm was valued at $1.5 billion, having secured $200 million in funding from venture funds such as Sequoia Capital, Andreessen Horowitz, ICONIQ, Coatue, and Kleiner Perkins. It is remote, but is headquartered in San Francisco, California, with an office in New York.

On November 30, 2023, it was announced that Atlassian completed its purchase of Loom, Inc.

== History ==
In 2015, the company was founded by Vinay Hiremath, Shahed Khan, and Joe Thomas in San Francisco, California.

In June 2016, the Loom Chrome extension was released for recording a user’s screen and face, and then providing a link for the video. In August 2018, Loom desktop app was launched, followed by the app for iOS in 2020 and Android in 2021.

In June 2021, Loom launched a software developer kit beta version that allows companies to add a Loom-powered video record button to their own applications. In the same year, the company surpassed 14 million users and 200,000 businesses across 230 countries worldwide. In 2022, Loom launched Loom HQ as the next iteration of the company’s platform for corporate teams.

In 2023, the company was acquired by Atlassian for $975 million. Following the acquisition, co-founder Vinay Hiremath published a personal blog post reflecting on the acquisition entitled "I am rich and have no idea what to do with my life".

== Investments ==
In October 2016, the company closed its seed round with $600,000. The lead investor was 1517 Fund.

In February 2019, Loom received nearly $11 million in a Series A round led by Kleiner Perkins. In November, the video messaging platform raised $30 million in a Series B round led by venture capital firm Sequoia Capital.

In May 2020, Loom closed a $28.75 million second Series B by Sequoia Capital and Coatue. The investments valued the company at an estimated $350 million. In May 2021, the company received $130 million in a Series C round led by Andreessen Horowitz, securing the company’s status as a “unicorn” and a $1.53 billion valuation.

== Recognition ==
In 2021, Loom entered the top three favorites in the category "Communicate and collaborate" Google's Best Chrome Extensions. In the same year, the company was named the best medium-size companies for remote employees by Quartz.

In 2022, Loom was included on Inc.'s "Best Workplaces 2022" list.
