= FishEye (software) =

Revision-control browser by Atlassian Software Systems

Fisheye
- Developer: Atlassian
- Stable release: 4.7.0 / February 14, 2019; 7 years ago
- Written in: Java
- Operating system: Cross-platform
- Type: Revision control
- License: Proprietary; free for non-commercial
- Website: atlassian.com/software/fisheye

Fisheye is a revision-control browser and search engine owned by Atlassian, Inc. Although Fisheye is a commercial product, it is freely available to open source projects and non-profit institutions. In addition to the advanced search and diff capabilities, it provides:

- the notion of changelog and changesets - even if the underlying version control system (such as CVS) does not support this
- direct, resource-based URLs down to line-number level
- monitoring and user-level notifications via e-mail or RSS

== Use in open-source projects ==
Atlassian approves free licenses for community and open-source installations under certain conditions. Many major open source projects use Fisheye to provide a front-end for the source code repository:

Project	Fisheye
JBoss	https://source.jboss.org
Apache	https://fisheye.apache.org/browse

Atlassian provides free licences of Fisheye and Crucible for open-source projects.

== Integration ==
As of 2010 Fisheye supported integration with the following revision control systems:

- CVS
- Git
- Mercurial
- Perforce
- Subversion

Due to the resource-based URLs, it is possible to integrate Fisheye with different issue and bug tracking systems. It also provides a REST and XML-RPC API. Fisheye also integrates with IDEs like IntelliJ IDEA via the Atlassian IDE Connector.

== See also ==
- Crucible
- OpenGrok
- Source code repository
- Trac
- ViewVC
