= Crucible (software) =

Software for code review

- Developer: Atlassian
- Stable release: 4.9.0 / December 20, 2024; 22 months ago
- Written in: Java
- Operating system: Cross-platform
- Type: Code review
- License: Proprietary
- Website: www.atlassian.com/crucible

Crucible is a collaborative code review application by Australian software company Atlassian. Like other Atlassian products, Crucible is a Web-based application primarily aimed at enterprise, and certain features that enable peer review of a codebase may be considered enterprise social software.

Crucible is particularly tailored to remote workers, and facilitates asynchronous review and commenting on code. Crucible also integrates with popular source control tools, such as Git and Subversion. Crucible is not open source, but customers are allowed to view and modify the code for their own use.

== See also ==
- Fisheye
- Bamboo
- Confluence (software)
- Jira (software)
