= Slack (software) =

Messaging software application

- Original authors: Stewart Butterfield, Eric Costello, Cal Henderson, and Serguei Mourachov
- Developer: Slack Technologies (Salesforce)
- Release: August 2013; 13 years ago
- Written in: Electron (C++, JavaScript, TypeScript, React, Redux, etc.), Hack (backend)
- Operating system: Microsoft Windows, macOS, Linux, iOS, Android
- Available in: 12 languages
- List of languages Chinese (Traditional), Chinese (Simplified), English (UK), English (US), French (France), German (Germany), Italian (Italy), Japanese (Japan), Korean (South Korea), Portuguese (Brazil), Spanish (Latin America), Spanish (Spain)
- Type: Collaborative software
- License: Proprietary
- Website: slack.com

Slack is a cloud-based team communication platform developed by Slack Technologies, which has been owned by Salesforce since 2021. Slack uses a freemium model. Slack is primarily offered as a business-to-business service, with its user base being predominantly team-based businesses while its features are focused on business administration and communication.

== History ==
Slack originated as an internal communication tool used within Stewart Butterfield's company Tiny Speck, during its work on the development of Glitch, an online video game. These communication tools were initially built around the Internet Relay Chat (IRC) protocol and included scripts designed to automate and organize file exchanges among its development team. By October 2012, Stewart Butterfield realized that Glitch was not going to be profitable. As a result, he decided to change the direction of his company and repurpose the communication tools they had developed into a new product.

In 2012, Butterfield said the name "Slack" was derived from the phrase "Searchable Log of All Conversation and Knowledge", replacing the previous codename "linefeed".

In August 2013, Slack was launched to the public and continued to maintain compatibility with IRC, reflecting its origin. Additionally, it was compatible with XMPP messaging protocols. In May 2018 however, the company chose to close down these corresponding gateways due to limitations inherent in those protocols.

On July 26, 2018, Slack acquired HipChat and Stride from Atlassian, with plans to shut down both services in February 2019 and migrate their users to Slack.

In June 2019, Slack went public through a direct public offering to reach a market value of $19.5 billion.

In July 2020, Slack acquired Rimeto, a startup specializing in employee directories and profiles, and in June 2021, its functionality was launched as an optional feature within Slack named "Slack Atlas".

On December 1, 2020, Slack and Salesforce announced an agreement for Salesforce to acquire the company for approximately $27.7 billion. The acquisition was completed on July 21, 2021.

On December 5, 2022, Salesforce announced that Butterfield was leaving Slack and would be succeeded by Lidiane Jones, an executive vice president at Salesforce. On November 13, 2023, Salesforce executive Denise Dresser was appointed to replace Jones. Dresser departed for OpenAI in December 2025, and Rob Seaman was named interim CEO.

In August 2024, Box and Slack announced an expanded partnership that introduced secure AI capabilities to enterprise content management.

=== Outages and security breaches ===
In March 2015, Slack announced that it had been hacked for over four days in February 2015 and that some data associated with user accounts had been compromised, including email addresses, usernames, hashed passwords, phone numbers, and Skype IDs. In response to the attacks, Slack added two-factor authentication to its service.

On January 4, 2021, Slack suffered a significant outage that lasted several hours. From 10 AM ET until 3 PM ET, users could not log in, send or receive messages, place or answer calls, or use Slack connections. After 3 PM, most of the core features became operational, except for push notifications, email, and third-party integrations, including Google Calendar and Outlook Calendar.

In 2022, Slack suffered widely reported outages on February 22, March 9 and July 26. On December 31, 2022, Slack announced that its private GitHub repositories had been compromised during the previous weeks, using stolen security tokens.

In February 2025, Slack experienced a widely reported outage. In June, in response to increasing scrutiny about AI firms and their handling of personal and customer data, Slack began blocking LLMs from indexing, copying, or storing data accessed via the Slack API on a long-term basis.

== Features ==
Slack offers many IRC-style features, including persistent chat rooms known as "channels", which are organized by topic, as well as private groups and direct-messaging functionalities. All content, including files, conversations, and people, is searchable within Slack. Users can express their reactions in the form of emojis to any message.

Slack allows communities, groups, or teams to join a "workspace" via a specific URL or invitation sent by a team admin or owner. A workspace can contain both public and private channels, with public channels being accessible to all members of the workspace. Both public and private channels can be converted interchangeably.

Slack integrates with many third-party services and supports community-built integrations, including Google Drive, Trello, Dropbox, Box, Heroku, IBM Bluemix, Crashlytics, GitHub, Runscope, Zendesk, and Zapier. In July 2015, Slack launched an integration with Google Calendar. Later, in December of the same year, a searchable directory was introduced, consisting of over 150 integrations that users can install.

Slack allows users to incorporate and customize chatbots known as "Slackbots". These chatbots can be configured to send notifications, reminders, or provide tailored responses to specific phrases, among other functions. Furthermore, Slack provides an application programming interface that enables users to develop applications and automate various processes, including sending notifications based on input, generating alerts for specific conditions, creating internal support tickets, and more. In January 2026, Salesforce transitioned Slackbot from an automated assistant into an integrated agentic AI, using Anthropic's Claude model.

In March 2022, Slack introduced a new voice conference feature known as "huddles". Within a Huddle, users have the capability to mute or unmute themselves, share their screens, draw on a shared screen, and invite others to the call. In June 2022, Huddles received the additional functionality of video calls. Huddles are restricted to only two participants on free tiers, while paid plans offer the capacity for up to 50 participants.

In March 2023, Salesforce announced the partnership with OpenAI to launch a ChatGPT integration for Slack that can be used for summarizing conversations, answering questions, or drafting replies. In May 2025, Salesforce added Agentforce to Slack, allowing companies to build and deploy task-specific AI agents.

In October 2025 at Dreamforce, the Agentforce 360 platform was announced, with Slack as the frontend "agentic OS". Anthropic launched Claude Code as a beta feature within Slack in December 2025, allowing developers to code tasks directly from chat threads.

Slack provides mobile apps for iOS and Android in addition to their web browser client and desktop clients for macOS, Windows, and Linux (beta). Slack is also available for the Apple Watch, allowing users to send direct messages, see mentions, and make simple replies.

== Business model ==
Slack is a freemium product whose main paid features, limited to Pro and Business plans, are the ability to search more than 90 days' archived messages and add unlimited apps and integrations. They also claim support for an unlimited number of users. When freeCodeCamp attempted to switch its community of over 8,000 users to Slack in 2015, however, they experienced many technical issues and were advised by Slack support to limit their channels to "no more than 1,000 users (ideally more like 500)". That specific limit no longer applied by January 2017.

== Growth ==
In August 2013, 8,000 customers signed up for the service within 24 hours of its launch. In February 2015, the company reported that approximately 10,000 new daily active users had signed up each week, and that there were more than 135,000 paying customers spread across 60,000 teams. By April 2015, those numbers had grown to 200,000 paid subscribers and a total of 750,000 daily active users. Late in 2015, Slack passed more than a million daily active users. As of May 2018, Slack had over 8 million daily users, 3 million of whom had paid accounts. At the time of its S-1 filing for IPO, dated April 26, 2019, Slack reported more than 10 million daily active users from more than 600,000 organizations, located in more than 150 countries.

In 2019, it was estimated that employees at large firms were sending over 200 Slack messages per week on average. From 2013 to 2019 the amount of time spent on work email declined, which was attributed to the proliferation of Slack and its competitors Symphony (launched in 2014), Workplace (launched in 2016), Microsoft Teams (launched 2017) and Google Hangouts Chat and Meet (launched in 2018).

== Reception ==
In March 2015, the Financial Times wrote that Slack was the first business technology to have crossed from business into personal use since Microsoft Office and the BlackBerry. In 2017, New York magazine criticized the platform for being "another utility we both rely on and resent".

In 2017, Slack was recognized as the best startup of the year at the Crunchies Awards, organized by TechCrunch.

The digital rights group Electronic Frontier Foundation (EFF) has cautioned that "Slack stores and is able to read all of your communications, as well as identifying information for everyone in your workspace." They commended the company for following several best practices in standing up for users concerning government data requests, such as requiring a warrant for content stored on its server, and awarding it four out of five stars in its 2017 "Who has your back" report; the EFF also criticized Slack for "a broad set of exceptions" to its promise to notify users of such requests, and for other privacy shortcomings.

Slack has been criticized by users for storing user data exclusively on cloud servers under Slack control. This is found to be a particular issue for users with large teams, who experienced issues with connectivity within the app, access to archived messages, and the number of users for a given "workspace".

Slack has also been criticized for a retroactive 2018 change to its privacy policy, allowing access to all public and private chat messages by workspace administrators, without the need of consent from any parties using the app. According to the new policy, Slack workspace members are no longer notified when data is downloaded from their workspace.

Slack has also been criticized when used in free and open-source projects for the inability to search for messages and discussions.

== See also ==
- List of collaborative software
