= Stride (software) =

Communication tool

- Developer: Atlassian
- Operating system: Mac; Linux; Windows; Android; iOS; web-based
- Type: Business communication
- License: Proprietary
- Website: www.stride.com

Stride was a cloud-based team business communication and collaboration tool, launched by Atlassian on 7 September 2017 to replace the cloud-based version of HipChat. Stride software was available to download onto computers running Windows, Mac or Linux, as well as Android, iOS smartphones, and tablets. Stride was bought by Atlassian's competitor Slack Technologies and was discontinued on February 15, 2019.

The features of Stride include chat rooms, one-on-one messaging, file sharing, 5 GB of file storage, group voice and video calling, built-in collaboration tools, and up to 25,000 of searchable message history. Premium features include unlimited file storage, users, group chat rooms, file sharing and storage, apps, and history retention. The premium version, priced at $3/user/month, also includes advanced meeting functionality like group screen sharing, remote desktop control, and dial-in/dial-out capabilities. Stride offered integrations with Atlassian's other products as well as other third-party applications listed in the Atlassian Marketplace, such as GitHub, Giphy, Stand-Bot and Google Calendar.

Stride offered additional features beyond messaging to improve efficiency and productivity. It aimed to reduce collaboration noise by introducing a "focus" mode, and eliminates the divisions between text chat, voice meetings, and videoconferencing, by simplifying transitioning between these modes in the same channel.

On July 26, 2018, Atlassian announced that HipChat and Stride would be discontinued February 15, 2019, and that it had reached a deal to sell their intellectual property to Slack. Slack paid an undisclosed amount over three years to assume the user bases of the services, while Atlassian took a minority investment in Slack. The companies also announced a commitment to work on integration of Slack with Atlassian services.

== See also ==
- List of collaborative software
