= Public offering =

Offering of securities of a company to the public

A public offering is the offering of securities of a company or a similar corporation to the public. Generally, the securities are to be publicly listed. In most jurisdictions, a public offering requires the issuing company to publish a prospectus detailing the terms and rights attached to the offered security, as well as information on the company itself and its finances. Many other regulatory requirements surround any public offering and they vary according to jurisdiction.

The services of an underwriter are often used to conduct a public offering.

== Stock offering ==
Initial public offering (IPO) is one type of public offering. Not all public offerings are IPOs. An IPO occurs only when a company offers its shares (not other securities) for the first time for public ownership and trading, an act making it a public company.

However, public offerings are also made by already-listed companies. The company issues additional securities to the public, adding to those currently being traded. For example, a listed company with 8 million shares outstanding can offer to the public another 2 million shares. This is a public offering but not an IPO. Once the transaction is complete, the company will have 10 million shares outstanding. Non-initial public offering of equity is also called seasoned equity offering.

A shelf prospectus is often used by companies in exactly that situation. Instead of drafting one before each public offering, the company can file a single prospectus detailing the terms of many different securities it might offer in the next several years. Shortly before the offering (if any) actually takes place, the company informs the public of material changes in its finances and outlook since the publication of the shelf prospectus.

== Other security types ==
Other types of securities, besides shares, can be offered publicly. Bonds, warrants, capital notes and many other kinds of debt and equity vehicles are offered, issued and traded in public capital markets. A private company, with no shares listed publicly, can still issue other securities to the public and have them traded on an exchange. A public company may also offer and list other securities alongside its shares.

== Primary and secondary offering ==
Most public offerings are in the primary market, that is, the issuing company itself is the offerer of securities to the public. The offered securities are then issued (allocated, allotted) to the new owners. If it is an offering of shares, this means that the company's outstanding capital grows. If it is an offering of other securities, this entails the creation or expansion of a series (of bonds, warrants, etc.). However, more rarely, public offerings take place in the secondary market. This is called a secondary market offering: existing security holders offer to sell their stake to other, new owners, through the stock exchange. The offerer is different from the issuer (the company). A secondary market offering is still a public offering with much the same requirements, including a prospectus.

== United States ==
In the United States, primary offerings are typically done via Form S-1 filings while secondary offerings often use Form S-3 to issue through a shelf registration.

== See also ==
- Public offering without listing
