= Warby Parker =

American eyeglasses and contact lens retailer

Warby Parker Inc.

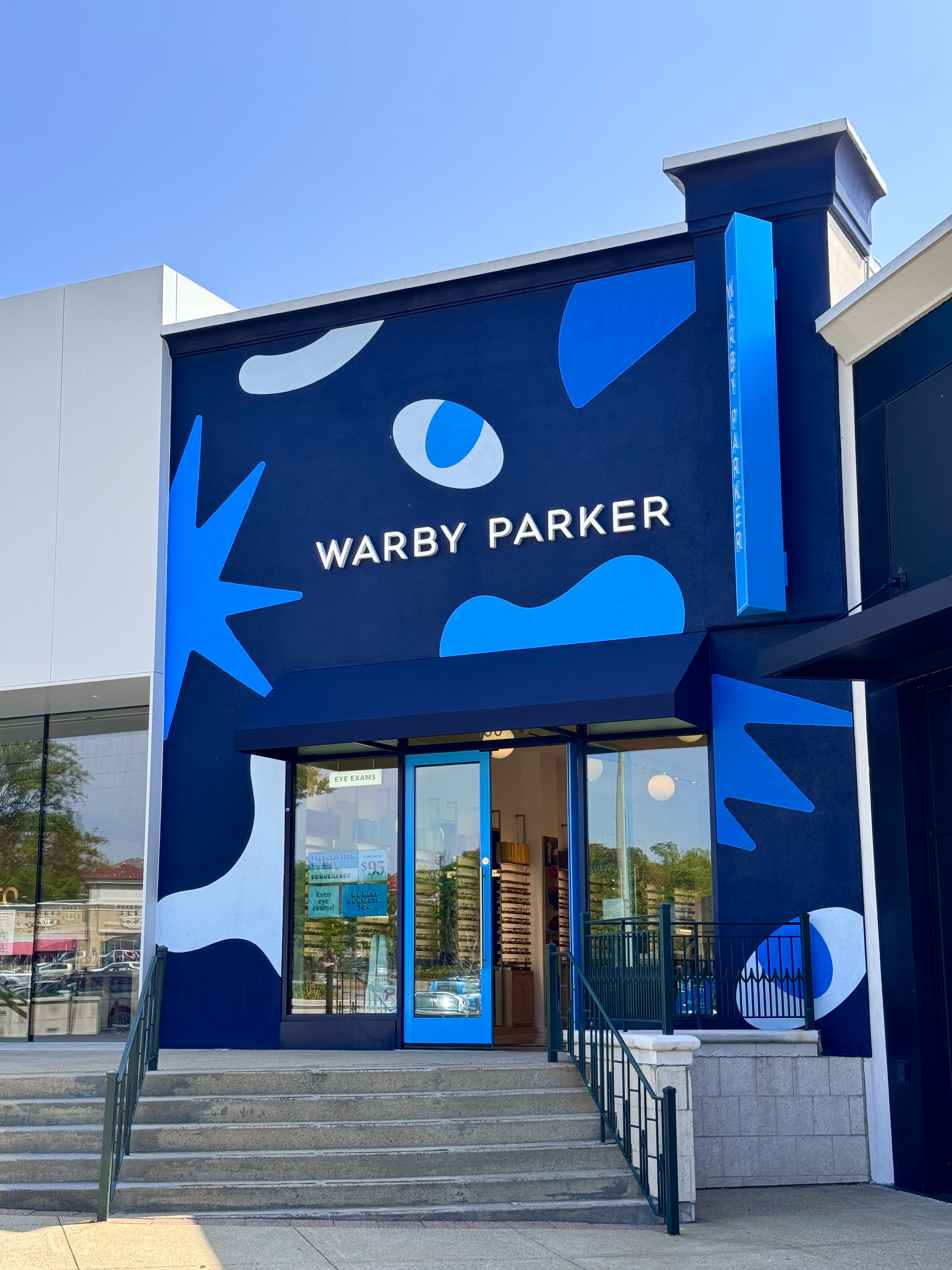
- Warby Parker in Birmingham, Alabama
- Formerly: JAND Inc.
- Type: Public
- Traded as: NYSE: WRBY; S&P 600 component
- Industry: Retail
- Founded: February 2010 in Philadelphia, Pennsylvania, U.S.
- Founders: Jeffrey Raider; Andrew Hunt; Neil Blumenthal; David Gilboa
- Headquarters: New York City, U.S.
- Number of locations: 323 (2025)
- Key people: Neil Blumenthal (co-CEO); David Gilboa (co-CEO); Ron Williams (lead director)
- Revenue: ▲US$871.9 million (2025)
- Operating income: ▲US$−5.3 million (2025)
- Net income: ▲US$−1.6 million (2025)
- Total assets: ▲US$720 million (2025)
- Total equity: ▲US$367 million (2025)
- Number of employees: 4,036 (2025)
- Website: warbyparker.com

Warby Parker Inc. is an American eyewear brand and retailer of prescription glasses, contact lenses, and sunglasses, headquartered in New York City. It also offers eye exams. Originally founded in 2010 as an online-only retailer, the company now generates most of its revenue from its physical retail stores.

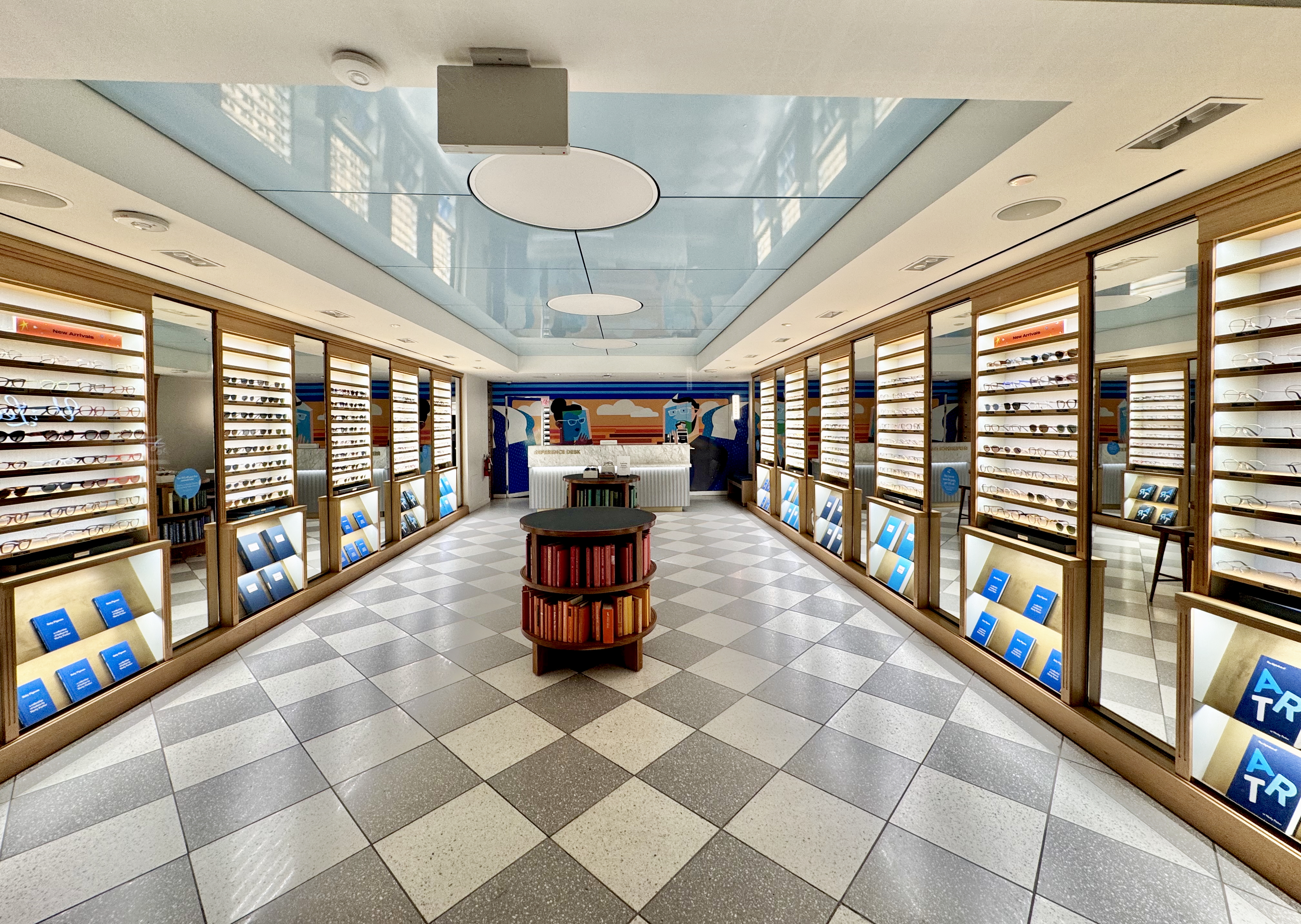
The interior of a Warby Parker retail store at Washington Union Station

The name "Warby Parker" derives from two characters that appear in a journal written by Jack Kerouac.

Warby Parker designs its products in-house and sells them directly to consumers through its website and stores. The company orders its own materials and works directly with partners in Italy, Vietnam, Japan, and China to manufacture their frames, often in the same factories as competitors such as Luxottica.

== History ==
The company was founded in 2010 in Philadelphia by Neil Blumenthal, Andrew Hunt, David Gilboa, and Jeffrey Raider while they were MBA students at the Wharton School of the University of Pennsylvania. Blumenthal, Hunt, Gilboa, and Raider received a $2,500 seed investment through the Venture Initiation Program and launched the company in February 2010. That month, shortly after launching, the company was covered by Vogue and GQ.

In May 2011, Warby Parker raised its first round of funding totaling $2.5 million. In September 2011, the company raised a Series A round of $12.5 million. In September 2012, it raised a $37 million Series B round. It raised an additional $4 million in February 2013 from American Express and Mickey Drexler. In 2011, Warby Parker shipped more than 100,000 pairs of glasses and had 60 employees. By the end of 2012, the company had grown to around 100 employees. In April 2015, the company raised $100 million in a funding round led by T. Rowe Price, valuing it at $1.2 billion.

In 2017, the company opened a 34,000-square-foot, $16 million optical lab in Rockland County, New York, to oversee a portion of the lens manufacturing process.

Warby Parker began offering virtual prescription check tests in 2017. The company released its first-ever kids’ line of glasses in January 2018.

In the early years of the company, in addition to eyeglasses, sunglasses, and contact lenses, Warby Parker sold monocles with prescription lenses as a way to reflect the brand’s emphasis on fun and whimsy.

In March 2018, Warby Parker raised $75 million in Series E funding, bringing its total funding to about $300 million.

In February 2019, Warby Parker released a Virtual Try-On feature that uses augmented reality and the iPhone's facial-mapping technology to display frames at realistic scale and placement on a user's face.

In November 2019, Warby Parker released its first brand of daily contacts, Scout by Warby Parker.

In August 2020, Warby Parker raised $245 million in a funding round that valued the company at $3 billion. The $245 million was a combination of a Series F round and a Series G round.

In July 2021, Warby Parker introduced the Virtual Vision Test app, a successor to its 2017 virtual prescription check, that allows iPhone users to update eyeglass and contact lens prescriptions.

On September 29, 2021, the company became a public company via direct listing on the New York Stock Exchange. Warby Parker was the first public benefit corporation to go public through a direct listing.

In November 2021, Warby Parker opened its second U.S. laboratory, in Summerlin, Nevada, near Las Vegas. The 69,000-square-foot lab was built to primarily serve customers living west of Texas.

As of late 2022, Warby Parker works with over 100 optometrists to offer in-store eye exams and prescriptions.

In October 2023, a federal appeals court ruled that the company's use of keyword 1-800 Contacts in search engine optimization to redirect search engine users to its website was not in violation of U.S. trademark law.

From April 1 to 8, 2024, Warby Parker made free solar eclipse glasses available at its U.S. retail stores to provide safe viewing of the Great North American Eclipse.

== Retail model ==
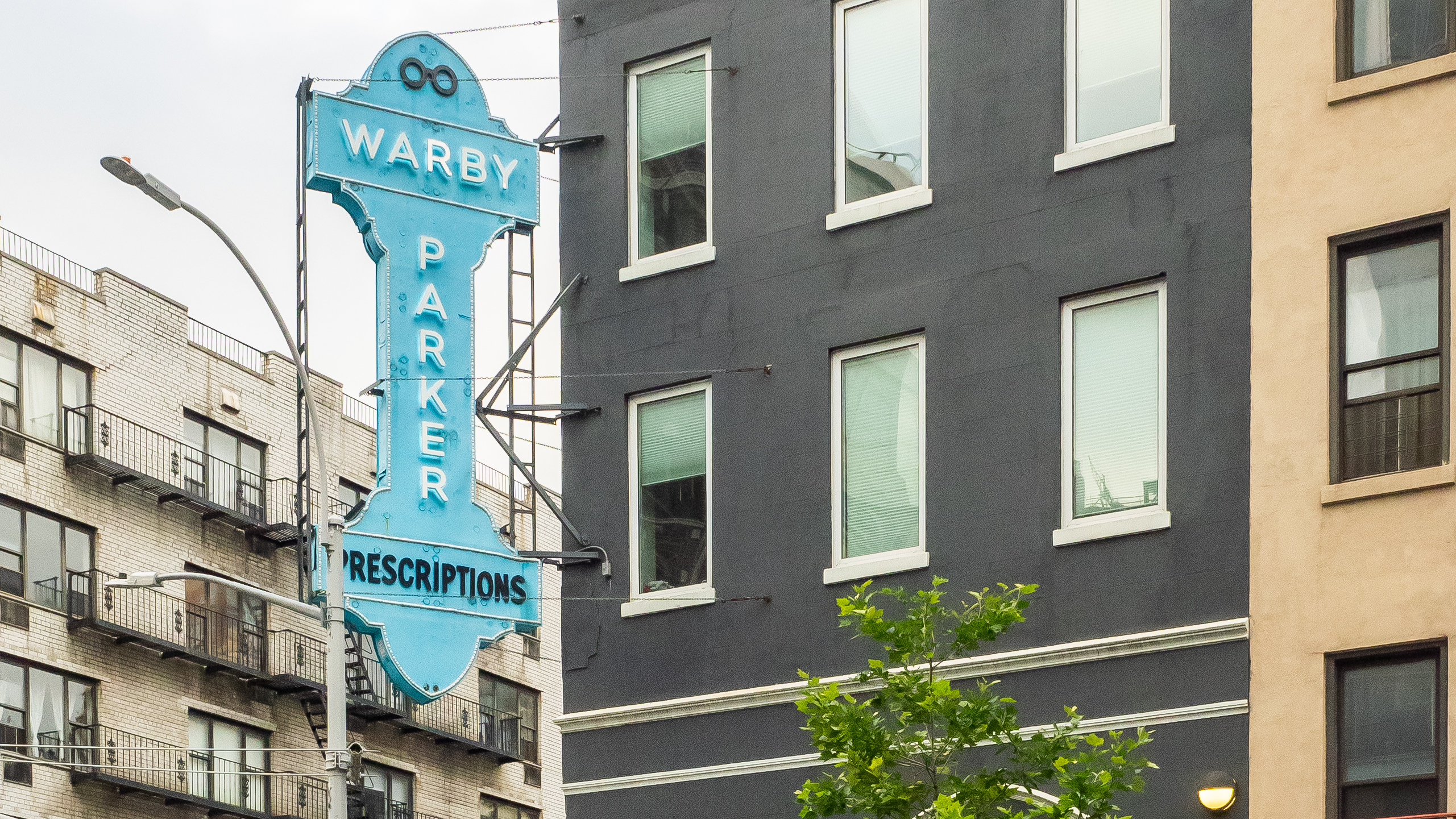
Vintage-style Warby Parker sign at a retail store on 82nd and Lexington Ave. in NYC

The company sells eyewear online and through its retail locations in the United States and Canada. Warby Parker's Home-Try-On program was a strategy used by the company in which its customers selected five frames from the website, which they received and tried on at home within a five-day period, free of charge, but that program ended at the end of 2025. The company has programs where customers upload a photo and try on frames virtually through their mobile app.

Warby Parker began operating online exclusively in 2010. As Warby Parker's revenue started to grow, the company tested several different retail models, including opening brick-and-mortar showrooms in boutiques across the country.

In 2012, Warby Parker launched the Class Trip, an outfitted yellow school bus that they turned into a store and toured across the country. The company opened its first brick-and-mortar store in April 2013 in New York City. Later, the company announced its plan to build its own point of sale system, which was implemented by 2015.

By January 2017, the company operated around 41 stores in 28 U.S. states along with two stores in Toronto and one in Vancouver.

In 2025, the company opened 47 new stores, the most it has added in one year. By the end of 2025, it operated 323 stores and grew its customer base to 2.69 million, a 7% increase from 2024. Also in 2025, the company opened locations in Target stores.

== Corporate social responsibility ==
Warby Parker uses a social entrepreneurship model, called Buy a Pair, Give a Pair. For each pair of glasses purchased, the company pays for the production of another pair of eyeglasses with nonprofit organizations like VisionSpring and Restoring Vision. In June 2014, Warby Parker announced it had distributed one million pairs of eyeglasses to people in need. Through Buy a Pair, Give a Pair, the company has distributed over 25 million pairs of glasses in more than 80 countries as of May 2026. The company also claims to be 100% carbon neutral across its operations.

In 2015, Warby Parker launched Pupils Project, which works to provide free vision screenings, eye exams, and glasses to U.S. public school students.

The company received B Corp certification in 2010 soon after its founding but let the status lapse, choosing not to reincorporate as a Benefit corporation. Warby Parker became a public benefit corporation and re-incorporated as a B Corp in mid-2021 prior to their direct listing. To coincide with the direct listing, the company launched the Warby Parker Impact Foundation and authorized up to 1% of the company’s outstanding shares for future grants to the foundation.

== Partnerships ==
In 2015, Warby Parker established a partnership with Nordstrom, the brand's first national retail partnership, which led the company to establish six pop-up shops nationwide.

In 2019, Warby Parker and Jimmy Fallon partnered to launch Spinnies, a pair of sunglasses that spun on one hinge. Warby Parker and Fallon partnered again, in March 2023, to release a pair of sunglasses called Flippies that are black on one side but azure blue when flipped over.

In November 2023, Warby Parker teamed with influencer Emma Chamberlain to launch a limited-edition collection, known as Emma Chamberlain x Warby Parker glasses.

In August 2025, Warby announced a three-year partnership with Texas Longhorns quarterback Arch Manning. Manning and his father, Cooper, appeared in a commercial for the company during the Longhorns’ first game of the 2025 season.

Warby Parker has also launched collaborative eyewear collections with celebrities and artists such as Chloë Sevigny, ASAP Nast, Geoff McFetridge, and Virgil Abloh, as well as the brands Noah and Entireworld.

Google announced its partnership with Warby Parker at Google I/O 2025 to develop AI-powered smart glasses based on the Android XR platform, supported by the Gemini AI assistant, investing up to $150 million in the initiative. At Google I/O 2026, Google unveiled the first Warby Parker-branded Android XR intelligent eyewear, announcing that the models would launch in fall 2026 with support for both prescription and non-prescription lenses.

In 2025, Warby Parker launched Book Report, a public event series at its flagship store in New York City that hosts conversations with authors. Participants have included Lena Dunham and Gloria Steinem.

== Recognition ==
In February 2015, Fast Company magazine ranked Warby Parker No. 1 on its annual list of the top innovative companies in the world.

The Webby Awards recognized Warby Parker in 2019 for its Virtual Try-On feature, naming Warby the "People’s Voice Winner" in the Apps, Mobile, and Voice/Fashion & Beauty category. In 2022, The Webby Awards named Warby Parker a "Webby Winner" in the Apps and Software/Health, Wellness & Fitness category for the company’s Virtual Vision Test app.
