= HipChat =

Web service for internal/private chat

- Developer: Atlassian
- Operating system: Mac, Linux, Windows, Android, iOS + Web-based application
- Type: Hosted chat and instant messaging
- License: Proprietary
- Website: www.atlassian.com/software/hipchat/enterprise/data-center

HipChat was a web service for internal private online chat and instant messaging. As well as one-on-one and group/topic chat, it also featured cloud-based file storage, video calling, searchable message-history and inline-image viewing. The software was available to download onto computers running Windows, Mac or Linux, as well as Android and iOS smartphones and tablets. Since 2014, HipChat used a freemium model, as much of the service was free with some additional features requiring organizations to pay per month. HipChat was launched in 2010 and acquired by Atlassian in 2012. In September 2017, Atlassian replaced the cloud-based HipChat with a new cloud product called Stride, with HipChat continuing on as the client-hosted HipChat Data Center.

In July 2018, Atlassian announced a partnership with Slack under which Slack would acquire the codebase and related IP assets of HipChat and Stride from Atlassian. Following this, HipChat and Stride customers were migrated to the Slack group collaboration platform in a transition that was completed by February 2019.

== History ==
HipChat was founded by Chris Rivers, Garret Heaton, and Pete Curley, who studied together at Rensselaer Polytechnic Institute (RPI) and also created HipCal, which was acquired by Plaxo in 2006. They also helped create Plaxo Pulse. They launched the first HipChat beta on December 13, 2009.

HipChat was made available to the public starting January 25, 2010.

On March 22, 2010, HipChat launched a web chat beta which allowed users to chat via the browser in addition to the existing Windows, Mac and Linux client. HipChat's web client came out of beta and SMS chat support was added on April 16, 2010. On May 12, 2010, HipChat unveiled its official API. HipChat is mainly written in PHP and Python using the Twisted software framework, but uses other third-party services.

On July 19, 2010, the team moved into an office in Sunnyvale, California. Co-founder Pete Curley announced that HipChat had secured $100,000 in funding on August 10, 2010. This round of seed funding allowed the company to start advertising and cover operational costs.

HipChat launched their iOS app on March 4, 2011, and their Android app on June 2, 2011.

On March 7, 2012, Atlassian, which had been using the service internally, announced it had acquired HipChat.

On April 24, 2017, HipChat experienced a hacking incident in which user info, messages, and content were accessed.

On May 11, 2017, Atlassian announced HipChat Data Center, a self-hosted enterprise chat tool.

On September 7, 2017, Atlassian discontinued the cloud-based HipChat, replacing it with HipChat's successor, called Stride, which offered additional features to enhance efficiency of collaboration. The client-hosted HipChat Data Center continued to be supported.

=== Integration with Slack ===
On July 26, 2018, Atlassian announced that HipChat and Stride would be discontinued February 15, 2019, and that it had reached a deal to sell their intellectual property to Slack. Slack will pay an undisclosed amount over three years to assume the user bases of the services, and Atlassian will take a minority investment in Slack. The companies also announced a commitment to work on integration of Slack with Atlassian services.

== Features ==
The primary features of HipChat were chat rooms, one-on-one messaging, searchable chat history, image sharing, 5 GB of file storage, and SMS messaging for one-on-one conversations. A premium version added video calling, screen sharing, unlimited file storage, history retention controls, and a virtual machine version allowed HipChat to run within corporate firewalls. A guest access mode allowed users outside of the organization to join a group chat via a shareable URL. Inline GIF playback and custom emoticons were also available. The product was available as a mobile client, a web client and a downloadable native application.

HipChat Data Center was Atlassian's self-hosted team communication offering.

In addition to integration with Atlassian's other products, HipChat integrated with services such as GitHub, MailChimp and Heroku. To allow for more third-party integrations to be added, HipChat featured a REST interface with several language-specific implementations.

Administrators were able to access 1-to-1 chat histories if the customer's company policies permitted viewing of employee communications.

== See also ==
- List of collaborative software
