= Wholesale fashion distribution =

Global market of bulk clothing sales

Wholesale fashion distribution refers to the global market of bulk clothing sales, in which producers, wholesalers and sellers are involved in a commercial, business-to-business process.

== Procedure ==
Most wholesalers get their fashion stocks from the producers that commercialize the latest collections in bulk, at volume discounts. Others purchase overstocks and closeout merchandise from retailers or distributors. Their clients are the resellers that purchase those stocks and sell it to the final consumers. Often, this process is financed through merchant factoring or vendor finance. In other cases, the merchant is assessed "counter rent" for a "store-within-a-store" concept, common in the cosmetics industry, but also not unheard of in clothing. In other cases, the vendor agrees to buy back unsold merchandise from the retailer — this is a common arrangement for higher-value seasonal clothing, like designer coats.

== Wholesale businesses ==
Many intermediaries exist to assure product quality or to hold stocks until needed by retailers who often have limited storage and retail space; they also help smaller retailers avoid issues like customs bonding and the need to secure an import license. The distributor sells large quantities of clothing stocks to a reseller, who tries to charge sufficient mark-ups to cover his costs and still make a profit. Often the supply chain will include more than one intermediary, although retailers usually strive for the fewest middlemen and lowest prices. Since the emergence of the Internet, many retailers have begun using it for just this purpose, and many new online-only wholesalers have emerged as a result.

== Risks ==
Business always involves risk, especially in a market strongly controlled by powerful fashion houses and manufacturers at one end and fickle consumers at the other. Fashion designers have to take into consideration the global supply chains and the seasonality of clothing which often means that clothing must be bought months or a year in advance and credit, transportation and warehousing arranged on tight deadlines. Producers are the ones that set up the apparel stocks starting prices and consumers are the ones that choose to buy or not a product sold at a certain price. Despite increasingly sophisticated tools like computer modelling for measuring and predicting consumer behavior and tweaking price and promotional activity, retailers can never be entirely certain of their sell through rate or the average price realized. Retailers hedge risk by seeking vendor financing or vendor buy-back arrangements as mentioned above, which distributes some of the risk of unsold merchandise back up the supply chain to the producer or wholesaler; they also open alternate channels such as outlet stores to liquidate unsold merchandise while freeing up floor space for new arrivals. Some "fast fashion" retailers, like Zara attempt to control their whole supply chain from design to production to the retail store, in order to practice just in time production, or something close to it; in cases of complete integration, there is no "wholesale fashion distribution," as the retailer is its own manufacturer and wholesaler.

== Related concepts ==
A related concept is drop shipping, a commercial process used in direct-to-consumer marketing. A drop-shipper relies on a third party, like an online fashion blog to generate consumer interest and initiate an electronic order that is sent to the drop shipper's warehouse for fulfillment. The profits are split between the drop shipper and the nominal seller at a pre-arranged rate, usually involving a commission structure. Because only the drop shipper has physical facilities, the notional online "retailer" faces much lower costs. This allows consumers to realize prices closer to the wholesale level, but it disadvantages retailers who lose control over many aspects of customer service, discounting, packaging etc.

== See also ==
- Wholesale marketing
