= Public exchange =

A public exchange is a trading venue open to all interested parties (many sellers and many buyers) that use a common technology platform and that are usually run by third parties or industry consortia. Public exchanges support community activities like distributing industry news, sponsoring online discussion groups, blogging and providing research.

== See also ==
- Marketplace
- Freelance marketplace
- Exchange (organized market)
