= Alternative public offering =

An alternative public offering (APO) is the combination of a reverse merger with a simultaneous private investment of public equity (PIPE). It allows companies an alternative to an initial public offering (IPO) as a means of going public while raising capital.

== Overview ==
There are two parts that comprise an APO: the reverse merger and the PIPE. In the reverse merger, the private company becomes public by merging with or being acquired by a public “shell” company. The shell company is a public company that has no assets or liabilities. When the private company and public shell merge, the combined entity thereafter trades under the previously private company's name rather than the shell company's name as it did before.

What differentiates an APO from a reverse merger is the simultaneous PIPE raise. A PIPE is when a publicly traded company sells its stock to investors in a privately negotiated transaction. The stock is normally sold at a discount to current market value and investors are normally acquiring unregistered “restricted” stock. The typical PIPE investor is an institutional investor such as a hedge fund or mutual fund. PIPEs are usually completed by investment banks who act as “Placement Agent” in the transaction.

== Process ==
An APO is a quick transaction compared to an initial public offering (IPO). At the closing of an APO, the public shell and private company sign merger documents to complete the reverse merger; file a 8K with the Securities and Exchange Commission (SEC), which is the required public disclosure of transaction; file a registration statement with the SEC to register the PIPE shares; release PIPE funds from escrow; and issue a press release announcing the completion of the transaction. The company's stock now begins trading on the OTCBB, reflecting the new valuation.

A company can close an APO in as little as 30 – 45 days. After the close of an APO, the company is funded and has exactly the same SEC disclosure requirements as an IPO. Approximately 3 to 4 months after the completion of the APO, the company's registration statement should clear comments and “go effective” with the SEC. When this is accomplished the company can then submit its application to obtain a listing on NASDAQ, AMEX, or NYSE. Listing approval for the exchanges typically takes about one month. At this point analyst research coverage begins and the company focuses on IR efforts, non-deal roadshow, conferences etc.

At the conclusion of a successful APO transaction, a company has received equity funding and has a base of institutional investors. The company has the sponsorship of an investment bank and is exchange listed with analyst coverage. There is now a true market value for the company and the company is positioned to raise additional capital in PIPE transactions.

== Benefits ==
Companies want to become public through an APO for several reasons. The public shell company already has shareholders, so after the APO is complete, the formerly private company typically already meets the shareholder requirements for NASDAQ and AMEX; 400 and 300 respectively. A company that goes public through an IPO must sell its stock to a large number of shareholders in order to meet these requirements necessitating a broad marketing and roadshow process. Unlike an IPO, there is no public disclosure required until the transaction closes. Customers, suppliers, employees, and press are unaware until closing. Therefore, a private company can pursue going public through an APO and understand what kind of investor response and valuation they will receive without having to make the “leap of faith” requirement of an IPO. With an IPO a company must publicly announce its intentions and file with the SEC at the beginning of the process. It is only after clearing comments with the SEC and after going on the roadshow that a company learns what kind of investor response and valuation it will receive.

The APO model owes much of its success to the involvement of the Investment Bank as the gatekeeper that standalone reverse mergers never had. In a traditional reverse merger, anyone could simply buy a shell and go public whether or not they had sufficient financial performance to justify being a public company. With an APO, the investment bank would not raise capital for a company that it did not believe would be successful in the marketplace. This is why the APO has such a high success rate. The investment bank also brings research, trading and liquidity to the company's stock after the transaction closes. Investment banks find the APO process appealing because they can receive the same fees and breakage for raising the capital as they do in an IPO in a much condensed period of time and to a significantly smaller number of investors.

PIPE investors are attracted to the APO because they get to buy stock at a negotiated discount to the projected public market value of a company. In addition, because the company completed a reverse merger and is now public, there is a guaranteed exit defined upfront if they wish to get out. After a company completes an APO, potential investors will be inclined to invest in additional PIPE raises for the company because the public company has had SEC disclosures from day one including audited financial statements, Sarbanes-Oxley, 10Qs, 8Ks, etc. Many tier 1 hedge funds are active investors in APO and many investment banks support the process. There are many tier 2 and tier 3 banks that are active in APO business.

== Disadvantages ==
Investors expect a discount on stock since they are buying restricted securities and thus this is a more expensive cost of capital to the company. The aftermarket of an APO typically takes 6–12 months to develop and thus there is minimal stock liquidity immediately at closing.

== See also ==
- Reverse takeover
- Mergers and acquisitions
- Direct public offering
