= Direct public offering =

Concept in finance

A direct public offering (DPO) is a method by which a company can offer an investment opportunity directly to the public.

== Description ==
A DPO is similar to an initial public offering (IPO) in that securities, such as stock or debt, are sold to investors. But unlike an IPO, a company uses a DPO to raise capital directly and without a "firm underwriting" from an investment banking firm or broker-dealer. A DPO may have a sponsoring FINRA broker, but the broker does not guarantee full subscription of the offering. In a DPO, the broker merely assures compliance with all applicable securities laws and assists with organizing the offering. Following compliance with federal and state securities laws, a company can sell its shares directly to anyone, even non-accredited investors, including customers, employees, suppliers, distributors, family, friends, and others.

Most DPOs do not require registration with the Securities and Exchange Commission (SEC) because they qualify for an exemption from the federal registration requirements. The most commonly used exemptions are for intrastate offerings, offerings under $10 million (the Rule 504 exemption), and Regulation A. In such cases, state level registration is generally required. State level registration is usually less onerous and time-consuming than federal registration. Charitable organizations are also exempt from registration with the SEC and in most states.

For offerings involving SEC filings (such as Regulation A) some law firms and other service providers offer to manage a DPO within twelve months, for less than $100,000. The process and time required for such an offering is similar to the process utilized by large companies to complete an IPO, except that many DPOs are marketed via internet advertising and ads direct to consumers.

Offerings that do not require federal registration or filings can be done more cheaply and quickly—costs can range from $15,000-$50,000, and it can take as little as one month to complete the process.

Direct public offerings are primarily utilized by small to medium size companies and nonprofits who want to raise capital directly from their own community rather than from financial institutions like banks and venture capital firms. Unlike an initial public offering, a direct public offering does not necessarily result in a company's shares being listed on a national securities exchange, although some issuers may later pursue a public listing.

Direct public offerings are often viewed as a type of investment crowdfunding; but unlike the offerings made under crowdfunding exemptions (Title III of the federal JOBS Act or similar state laws), DPOs are typically registered at the state level and undergo some degree of regulatory scrutiny. DPOs also generally offer more flexibility in marketing and soliciting investors for the offering than exempt crowdfunding offerings.

Some direct public offerings are now being conducted on crowdfunding platform sites. Many companies offer software and services to facilitate electronic DPOs on their websites.

== Pros and cons ==
The advantages of a direct public offering include: broader access to investment capital, the ability to raise capital from the company's own community (including non-wealthy investors), the ability to utilize stock to complete acquisitions and stock options to attract and retain employees, enhanced credibility and providing early investors with liquidity.

The disadvantages of a direct public offering include: the company must raise its own capital without the assistance of professional financiers, the process has significant cost which may significantly reduce the effective capital raised, like any financing, it takes management time and attention from business operations, and there may be ongoing financial and legal reporting requirements.

== Requirements ==
Any company or nonprofit following the applicable rules and regulations can conduct a direct public offering. There are no sales, profit, asset or other traditional requirements or qualifications.

Companies interested in completing a direct public offering must have:

1. a complete set of internally generated financial statements (which can usually be unaudited, though a few states require audited financials)
2. a disclosure statement (often called an offering memorandum or prospectus) providing all information potential investors need in order to make an investment decision
3. if applicable, state or federal regulatory approval.

Subject to compliance with federal and state securities laws, a company may sell its shares to the public using a variety of methods.

A company that conducts a DPO does not thereby become a publicly-traded company, nor does it typically become subject to SEC reporting requirements. However, the company may subsequently register its stock to trade on a public market or over-the-counter.

Some companies attempt to organize their financial statements, audit and legal filings largely on their own, but most utilize direct public offering services offered by law firm or a consulting firm.

== See also ==
- Initial Public Offering
- Alternative Public Offering
- Equity crowdfunding
