= 2020 Union budget of India =

Government budget

2020 Union Budget of India
- Emblem of India
- Submitted: 1 February 2020
- Submitted by: Nirmala Sitharaman (Minister of Finance)
- Submitted to: Parliament of India
- Presented: 1 Feb 2020
- Passed: 23 March 2020
- Country: India
- Parliament: 17th (Lok Sabha)
- Party: Bharatiya Janata Party
- Finance minister: Nirmala Sitharaman
- Total revenue: ₹30.83 trillion (US$320 billion) ▼(8.5%)
- Total expenditures: ₹35.09 trillion (US$360 billion) ▲(28.4%)
- Tax cuts: Numerous
- Deficit: 9.5%
- Website: www.indiabudget.gov.in

The 2020 Union Budget of India (ISO: 2020 Ke liye Bhārat Kā Saṅghīya Bajaṭ) was presented by the Finance Minister, Nirmala Sitharaman on 1 February 2020, as her second budget. This is the second budget of Narendra Modi-led NDA government's second term. The Economic Survey for 2019–2020 was released on 31 January 2020, a day before the budget. Before the budget speech the report of the 15th Finance Commission was tabled by the Finance Minister.

The central ideas of the Budget are "Aspirational India, Economic development, A Caring Society". These three broad themes are connected by governance that is corruption free and a financial sector that is clean and sound.

Notably, Nirmala Sitharaman read out a Kashmiri poem (Note: By the Kashmiri poet Dina Nath Kaul "Nadim".) during the budget speech in the Parliament, a Tamil couplet written by Thiruvalluvar and a verse from the Sanskrit work Raghuvamsam as well as a French phrase. Some of the aims announced were "improving digital governance, physical quality of life, disaster resilience and social security reach".

At 2 hours and 41 minutes, the budget speech was the longest ever delivered by a Finance Minister of India. Nirmala Sitharaman is also only the second woman to present the budget for a second time after Indira Gandhi.

== History ==
The Union Budget is the annual financial report of India; an estimate of income and expenditure of the government on a periodical basis. As per Article 112 of the Indian Constitution, it is a compulsory task of the government. The first budget of India was presented on 18 February 1860 by Scotsman James Wilson. The first Union Budget of Independent India was presented by RK Shanmukham Chetty on 26 November 1947.

== Background ==
The Union budget in 2020 was presented in a backdrop of a slowing down of the Indian economy with estimated GDP growth for 2019–20 being at an 11-year low of 5%. Factors such as the IL&FS (shadow banker, NBFC) crisis contributed to the slowdown; as well as international financial markets issues such as the China–United States trade war. In January 2020 Western Asset Management Company has reduced its government bond holdings following the atmosphere in the country due to the Citizenship (Amendment) Act, 2019 and the situation in Kashmir which are affecting the economic spirit. Investments in India will be shifted to other countries such as China and Malaysia.

According to the Economic Times, the BSE Sensex and Nifty have given positive returns only thrice in the last decade during the pre-Budget week, while offering positive returns five times in the post-budget week. In 2016, the markets gained 7.2% in the post-Budget week.

Rakesh Jhunjhunwala said that he "is not looking forward to any big-bang announcement in the forthcoming Union Budget, but expects the government to do some actual work". In January 2020 Nobel Laureates Abhijit Banerjee and Esther Duflo said: "The critical problem in the Indian economy is demand." Abhijit Banerjee said "we should forget about Budget deficits and meeting targets. We should even forget about inflation targeting. Let the economy rip a bit."

The Prime Minister of India invited people to share their ideas and suggestions related to the Union Budget on MyGov.in.

== Significant announcements ==
Education sector allocation is ₹993 billion (equivalent to ₹1.2 trillion or US$12 billion in 2023). Power and renewable energy sectors have been allocated ₹220 billion (equivalent to ₹260 billion or US$2.7 billion in 2023). ₹1,387 billion (equivalent to ₹1.6 trillion or US$17 billion in 2023) allocated for the welfare and upliftment of Scheduled Tribes and Scheduled castes and other Backward Classes. The allocation to the agriculture sector was ₹2,830 billion (equivalent to ₹3.3 trillion or US$35 billion in 2023) while rural development was allocated ₹1,230 billion (equivalent to ₹1.4 trillion or US$15 billion in 2023). Apart from this a 16-point agenda was listed by the Finance Minister for the agriculture sector as well as a "Blue Economy" initiative. Defence pensions have been allocated ₹130 billion (equivalent to ₹150 billion or US$1.6 billion in 2023) while development of the Union Territory of Jammu and Kashmir has been allocated ₹307.57 billion (equivalent to ₹360 billion or US$3.8 billion in 2023) and the Union Territory of Ladakh ₹59.58 billion (equivalent to ₹70 billion or US$730 million in 2023).

The healthcare budget has been increased by 10% to ₹690 billion (equivalent to ₹810 billion or US$8.4 billion in 2023). Funding for a campaign to eliminate tuberculosis by 2025 called TB Harega, Desh Jeetega was announced in the budget speech. Mission Indradhanush's scope has been expanded as well as the scope of the Jan Aushadhi Yojana Kendra scheme. Welfare of senior citizens and the disabled has been allocated ₹95 billion (equivalent to ₹110 billion or US$1.2 billion in 2023).

India's national gas grid to be increased by over 10,000 km. A policy will be formed for data centre construction as well as a National Logistics Policy. ₹80 billion (equivalent to ₹94 billion or US$980 million in 2023) allocated over five years for the National Mission on Quantum Technology and Applications. Five new smart cities to be developed. 100 more airports will be developed to support UDAN. The government plans to raise funds by selling a partial stake in Life Insurance Corporation (LIC) through an initial public offering (IPO). Stake in IDBI Bank to also be sold to the private sector. Indian Institute of Heritage and Conservation to be set up and five sites Rakhigarhi, Hastinapur, Sivasagar, Dholavira and Adichanallur to be developed into world class archaeological sites. An aim of the budget included improving the physical quality of life through a National Infrastructure Pipeline.

A tax-relief was announced including simplified tax processes. Finance Minister Nirmala Sitharaman slashed the personal income tax rate for individuals for fiscal year 2020–21. Under the new regime, taxpayers will pay 10%, 15%, 20% and 25% for incomes between ₹500,000–750,000, ₹750,000–1 million, ₹1–1.25 million and ₹1.25–1.5 million, respectively. However, to avail this scheme, which is optional, taxpayers will have to forego exemptions. A taxpayer charter was proposed as well. An International Bullion Exchange to be set up at the IFSC in GIFT was also announced. Apart from modifying the definition of an NRI, non-tax paying NRIs would be taxed in India if not paying taxes elsewhere. The dividend distribution tax (DDT) has been removed and the "shareholder based taxation system" returns. Some tax exemptions have been introduced for some sovereign funds while a new tax deducted at source for e-commerce operators. Rules related to charity contributions and auditing of non-corporate businesses will see some new changes, according to Mondaq. The Finance Bill 2020 included "tax incentives" such as additional exemptions, modification of definitions such as "business trust", widening of the tax base, "revenue mobilisation measures", "penalties for fake invoices", minimizing taxpayer complications etc.

₹1 billion (equivalent to ₹1.2 billion or US$12 million in 2023) has been allocated to holding the G-20 summit. ₹6 billion (equivalent to ₹7.1 billion or US$73 million in 2023) was allocated for the Prime Ministers Special Protection Group (SPG) cover, up ₹600 million (equivalent to ₹710 million or US$7.3 million in 2023) from last year. Certain defence imports to be exempt from customs duty.

== Reactions ==
Reaction to the budget was mixed.

=== Political ===
Prime minister Narendra Modi made a statement saying that the budget has both "vision and action".

Among the opposition members, P. Chidambaram, the former Union Finance Minister of India, said that the "government has given up on reviving economy". Also, with reference to the budget allocation for Jammu and Kashmir and Ladakh, Chidambaram also said that money can't replace freedom. Rahul Gandhi criticized the budget for not providing any real solution to solve the unemployment issue. Sitaram Yechury of CPI(M) said that the budget does nothing to rid "people's miseries". Mamata Banerjee said that she was "shocked and appalled" with the governments plan related to the heritage of the country. T. M. Thomas Isaac, the finance minister of Kerala said the budget was a "war cry" against the state; this was because the budget for the state had been reduced.

=== Academics ===
According to University of Kalyani economist Byasdeb Dasgupta, the budget "served the interests of finance at the cost of the real economy without considering the ongoing stagnation in the real economy, steep rises in the rate of unemployment and informalization of the economy". He especially opposed the abolition of the dividend distribution tax and the cuts to corporate taxes.

=== Private sector ===
Moody's Investors Service has said that the "budget highlights the challenges to fiscal consolidation". PWCs noted that there were "some positives from a tax perspective". NASSCOM also reaffirms this and notes that the tax harassment for taxpayers was something the government was committed to remove. Head of Research at Geojit Financial Services, rated the Budget "below par". Swaminathan Aiyer called the budget "reasonable". Satish Reddy said that the budget showed the continued focus of the government's in healthcare.

=== Stock markets ===
As the Union budget was presented in the parliament, Nifty fell by over 3% (373.95 points) while Sensex fell by more than 2% (1000 points). Economic Times reports some reasons for this including lack of sops for the automobile or real estate, confusion over new income tax slabs, high divestment targets [₹2,100 billion (equivalent to ₹2.5 trillion or US$26 billion in 2023)] and abolition of dividend distribution tax.

== Financial Bill 2020 ==
As the house curtailed its sittings in the wake of the COVID-19 pandemic, Lok Sabha passed the Financial Bill 2020 on 23 March 2020, without any discussion. Rajya Sabha Chairman M. Venkaiah Naidu and Lok Sabha Speaker Om Birla met political leaders to strike a deal to clear the important bill before Parliament was adjourned. Minister of State for Parliamentary Affairs Arjun Ram Meghwal said it was an "extraordinary situation" and that a decision to pass the Bill without any discussion was taken at the all-party meeting.

The key changes introduced in the Bill are:

- NRIs – Non-Resident Indians will be taxed on India-controlled income above ₹1.5 million (US$16,000).
- Equalisation levy of 2% on non-resident e-commerce unless they have a PE in India.
- Exemption in tax to Sovereign Wealth Fund enlarged to Pension Funds for infra investment.
- Tax on cash withdrawal of over ₹2 million (US$21,000) at the rate of 2% if tax return not filed for three years with effect from 1 July 2020.
- TDS rate on payment of dividend to non-resident, foreign company at 20 percent with effect from 1 October 2020.
- DDT exemption will be given to REITs and InvITs if not under the new corporate tax regime.
- No 2 percent tax on withdrawal of over ₹10 million (US$100,000) cash from banks, co-operative banks, PO.
- Tax on cash withdrawal of over ₹10 million (US$100,000) at 5 percent if tax return not filed for three years with effect from 1 July 2020.

== See also ==
- Economy of India
- Economic development in India
- Economic Advisory Council
- 2018 Union budget of India
