= Accredited investor =

Investor with a special legal status

An accredited or sophisticated investor is an investor with a special status under financial regulation laws. The definition of an accredited investor (if any), and the consequences of being classified as such, vary between countries. Generally, accredited investors include high-net-worth individuals, banks, financial institutions, and other large corporations, who have access to complex and higher-risk investments such as venture capital, hedge funds, and angel investments.

Laws may require that some types of financial offerings may only be made to accredited investors.

== Criteria for accreditation ==
=== Australia ===
s 708(8) of the Corporations Act 2001 is found in Chapter 6D (Fundraising). It defines "sophisticated investor" so as to exclude them from certain disclosure requirements.

That section provides for an accountant to issue a certificate stating that an individual meets the criteria prescribed in the Corporations Regulations 2001, namely net assets of at least $2.5 million, or a gross income for each of the last two financial years of at least $250,000.

There is a second definition of "sophisticated investor" in s 761GA of the Corporations Act 2001 in Chapter 7 (Financial services and markets). It defines sophisticated investors so that they can be treated as wholesale (rather than retail) clients.

According to ASIC, a person with a sophisticated investor certificate is a sophisticated investor for the purpose of Chapter 6D, and a wholesale client for the purpose of Chapter 7.

=== Brazil ===
On December 17, 2014, CVM issued the Instructions No. 554 and No. 555, which became effective from July 1, 2015 according to Mondaq.

The definition of accredited investors under the United States SEC’s Regulation D are analogous in Brazil to the combination of two categories of investors, classified by the Comissão de Valores Mobiliários (CVM) as "investidor profissional" (professional investor) and "investidor qualificado" (qualified investor) under Instruction 539, articles 9-A and 9-B.

=== Canada ===
An "Accredited Investor" (as defined in NI 45 106) is:

1. a person registered under the securities legislation of a jurisdiction of Canada, as an adviser or dealer, other than a person registered solely as a limited market dealer under one or both of the Securities Act (Ontario) or the Securities Act (Newfoundland and Labrador); or
2. an individual registered or formerly registered under the securities legislation of a jurisdiction of Canada as a representative of a person referred to in paragraph (a); or
3. an individual who, either alone or with a spouse, beneficially owns financial assets having an aggregate realizable value that before taxes, but net of any related liabilities, exceeds $1,000,000; or
4. an individual whose net income before taxes exceeded $200,000 in each of the two most recent calendar years or whose net income before taxes combined with that of a spouse exceeded $300,000 in each of the two most recent calendar years and who, in either case, reasonably expects to exceed that net income level in the current calendar year; or
5. an individual who, either alone or with a spouse, has net assets of at least $5,000,000; or
6. a person, other than an individual or investment fund, that has net assets of at least $5,000,000 as shown on its most recently prepared financial statements; or
7. a trust company or trust corporation registered or authorized to carry on business under the Trust and Loan Companies Act (Canada) or under comparable legislation in a jurisdiction of Canada or a foreign jurisdiction, acting on behalf of a fully managed account managed by the trust company or trust corporation, as the case may be; or
8. an investment fund that distributes or has distributed its securities only to (i) a person that is or was an accredited investor at the time of the distribution, (ii) a person that acquires or acquired securities in the circumstances referred to in sections 2.10 of NI 45 106 [Minimum amount investment] or 2.19 of NI 45 106 [Additional investment in investment funds], or (iii) a person described in paragraph (i) or (ii) that acquires or acquired securities under section 2.18 of NI 45 106 [Investment fund reinvestment];
9. a person acting on behalf of a fully managed account managed by that person, if that person is registered or authorized to carry on business as an adviser or the equivalent under the securities legislation of a jurisdiction of Canada or a foreign jurisdiction; or
10. a person in respect of which all of the owners of interests, direct, indirect or beneficial, except the voting securities required by law to be owned by directors, are persons that are accredited investors (as defined in NI 45 106); or
11. an investment fund that is advised by a person registered as an adviser or a person that is exempt from registration as an adviser.

Note that as of 2016, many provinces in Canada now allow non-accredited investors to invest in private markets – under specified limits.

=== European Union ===
Retail clients requesting treatment as "elective" professional clients (as defined by Markets in Financial Instruments Directive (MiFID)) must satisfy at least two of the following quantitative criteria in assessing the client's expertise, experience and knowledge:

- the client has carried out trade transactions, in significant size (at least €50,000), on the relevant market at an average frequency of 10 per quarter over the previous four quarters;
- the size of the client's financial instrument portfolio, defined as including cash deposits and financial instruments, exceeds €500,000;
- the client works or has worked in the financial sector for at least one year in a professional position which requires knowledge of the transactions or services envisaged

=== Israel ===
The criteria are:

1. An investment trust or fund manager.
2. A management company or Provident fund as defined in the Israeli Provident fund law.
3. An insurance company.
4. A banking corporation and auxiliary corporation as defined in the Israeli Banking law (Licensing), other than a joint services company.
5. A registered (licensed) investment adviser.
6. An exchange member.
7. An underwriter qualified to under section 56(c) of the Israel Securities Act.
8. Corporation (except a corporation incorporated for the purpose of receiving investment advisory services, investment marketing or portfolio management) with equity of more than ₪50 million. See foreign accounting rules, international accounting standards and generally accepted accounting principles in the United States as defined under Sections 17(b)(1) and 36 of the Israel Securities Act for the definition of "Equity".
9. A natural person that gave consent in writing to be considered eligible for the purposes of this Law and that meets at least one of the three criterion below:
  - Owns a total value of cash, deposits and financial assets, as defined in Section 52 of the Israel Securities Act, which exceeds ₪9.4 million.
  - Owns a total value of securities, as defined in Section 52 of the Israel Securities Act, which exceeds ₪12 million.
  - Has an annual income of at least ₪1.4 million for each of the last two years (or, together with a spouse, have had an annual income totaling ₪2 million for each of the past two years).
  - Owns a total value of cash, deposits, financial assets and securities as defined in Section 52 of the Israel Securities Act worth, in total, more than ₪5.9 million and have had an annual income of at least ₪703,000 for each of the past two years (or, with a spouse, having a combined annual income totaling ₪900,000 for each of the past two years).
10. A corporation which is wholly owned by accredited investors based on the criteria above.
11. A corporation incorporated abroad whose activities are similar to those of the corporations set out above.

=== New Zealand ===
The Securities Act 1978 was repealed on 1 December 2014, when the Financial Markets Conduct Act 2013 came fully into force. Under the Act, a person is a wholesale investor if they have net assets or turnover of at least $5 million in each of the two most recently completed financial years, raised from the $2 million net asset or $200,000 income test under the former Act. A person may instead certify as an eligible investor if they have enough experience to assess the offer, with the certification confirmed by a financial adviser, qualified statutory accountant or lawyer.

=== Singapore ===
In Singapore, Accredited Investor is defined in Section 4A(1)(a) of the Securities and Futures Act (SFA), Chapter 289.

1. NET Personal assets exceeding $2 million (or equivalent in foreign currency). Or
2. Income in preceding 12 months of not less than $300,000 (or equivalent in foreign currency). Or
3. A corporation with net assets exceeding $10 million in value (or its equivalent in a foreign currency) or such other amount as the Authority may prescribe, in place of the first amount, as determined by — (A)the most recent audited balance-sheet of the corporation; or (B)where the corporation is not required to prepare audited accounts regularly, a balance-sheet of the corporation certified by the corporation as giving a true and fair view of the state of affairs of the corporation as of the date of the balance-sheet, which date shall be within the preceding 12 months;
4. The trustee of such trust as the Authority may prescribe, when acting in that capacity; or
5. Such other person as the Authority may prescribe.

=== United States ===
In the United States, to be considered an accredited investor, a natural person must have a net worth of at least $1,000,000, excluding the value of one's primary residence, or have income at least $200,000 each year for the last two years (or $300,000 combined income if married) and have the expectation to make the same amount this year, or must otherwise be a holder of a specific license in good standing. Unlike most ordinary investors, accredited investors are permitted to invest in funds exempt from registering with the SEC under Section 3(c)(1) of the Investment Company Act of 1940 (so-called "3(c)(1) funds"), though not necessarily those exempt under section 3(c)(7).

There is a more restricted US legal criteria of "qualified purchaser". To count as a "qualified purchaser", a natural person must typically have at least $5,000,000 of investable assets. Qualified purchasers may invest in 3(c)(7) funds in addition to 3(c)(1) funds.

Compared to natural persons, institutional investors generally require a larger amount of mimimum assets to count as accredited investors or qualified purchasers.

More precisely, the term "accredited investor" is defined in Rule 501 of Regulation D of the U.S. Securities and Exchange Commission (SEC) as:

1. a bank, insurance company, registered investment company, business development company, or small business investment company;
2. an employee benefit plan, within the meaning of the Employee Retirement Income Security Act, if a bank, insurance company, or registered investment adviser makes the investment decisions, or if the plan has total assets in excess of $5 million;
3. a charitable organization, corporation, or partnership with assets exceeding $5 million;
4. a director, executive officer, or general partner of the company selling the securities;
5. a business in which all the equity owners are accredited investors;
6. a natural person who has individual net worth, or joint net worth with the person's spouse, that exceeds $1 million at the time of the purchase, or has assets under management of $1 million or above, excluding the value of the individual's primary residence;
7. a natural person with income exceeding $200,000 in each of the two most recent years or joint income with a spouse exceeding $300,000 for those years and a reasonable expectation of the same income level in the current year
8. a trust with assets in excess of $5 million, not formed to acquire the securities offered, whose purchases a sophisticated person makes.
9. a natural person who has certain professional certifications, designations or credentials or other credentials issued by an accredited educational institution, which the Commission may designate from time to time. Presently holders in good standing of the Series 7, Series 65, and Series 82 licenses.
10. natural persons who are "knowledgeable employees" of a fund with respect to private investments.
11. limited liability companies with $5 million in assets may be accredited investors.
12. SEC and state-registered investment advisers, exempt reporting advisers, and rural business investment companies (RBICs) may qualify.
13. Indian tribes, governmental bodies, funds, and entities organized under the laws of foreign countries, that own "investments", as defined in Rule 2a51-1(b) under the Investment Company Act, in excess of $5 million and that was not formed for the specific purpose of investing in the securities offered.
14. Family offices with at least $5 million in assets under management and their "family clients", as each term is defined under the Investment Advisers Act.
15. "Spousal equivalent" to the accredited investor definition, so that spousal equivalents may pool their finances for the purpose of qualifying as accredited investors.

==== Opportunities ====
Accredited investors have the legal right to buy securities that are not registered with regulatory bodies such as the SEC. Accredited investors also have privileged access to venture capital, hedge funds and transactions involving complex and riskier investments and instruments.

== See also ==
- Institutional investor
- Big boy letter
