= Sullivan & Cromwell =

American law firm

Sullivan & Cromwell LLP
- Headquarters: 125 Broad Street; New York, NY 10004; United States
- No. of offices: 13 total, 9 international
- No. of attorneys: 840 (2024)
- Key people: Robert Giuffra (Co-chair); Scott D. Miller (Co-chair)
- Revenue: ▲$2.1 billion (2025)
- Profit per equity partner: ▲$6.7 million (2025)
- Date founded: 1879
- Founder: Algernon Sydney Sullivan; William Nelson Cromwell
- Website: sullcrom.com

Sullivan & Cromwell LLP is an American multinational white shoe law firm headquartered in New York City. It was founded in 1879 by Algernon Sydney Sullivan and William Nelson Cromwell. It is one of the world’s most profitable law firms. The firm has a long history of international work, and was among the first U.S. law firms to open overseas offices.

Sullivan & Cromwell's lawyers have been involved in various controversies, including work with tobacco companies, an insider trading scandal, criticism for representation of the FTX estate in the FTX cryptocurrency exchange collapse and the political background checks of candidates. The law firm represented President Donald Trump in his appeal of his criminal conviction in New York State court.

== History ==
Founded in 1879 by Algernon Sydney Sullivan and William Nelson Cromwell, Sullivan & Cromwell advised John Pierpont Morgan during the creation of Edison General Electric (1882) and later guided key players in the formation of U.S. Steel (1901). Cromwell developed the concept of a holding company, persuading New Jersey to include it in state law and enabling companies incorporating there to avoid antitrust laws. The firm also worked with less-successful businesses during the volatile decades before the establishment of modern federal bankruptcy laws; it pioneered efforts to reorganize insolvent companies through what became known as the "Cromwell plan." Cromwell attorney Rodgin Cohen was called "the physician of Wall Street" for his ability to rescue failing companies.

The post-World War I era saw an expanded need for financing. Sullivan & Cromwell designed many of the equity and debt agreements used during this period, including 94 loan agreements to European borrowers during one seven-year period. The firm's business expanded substantially during the 1930s, when it began to represent companies facing increased regulation and became for a time the world's biggest law firm. During the Great Depression and its aftermath, the firm litigated in the newly emerging fields of shareholder derivatives, antitrust actions, federal income tax law, and registration under the Securities Act of 1933. The firm developed the first major registration statement under the Securities Act of 1933 and influenced the development of tax law in the mutual fund industry.

Sullivan & Cromwell performed the legal work for the Ford Motor Company's $643 million offering in 1956, the biggest ever to that date. Evolving business trends continued to be reflected in the firm's organization; a banking practice was formed in 1968, and a mergers and acquisitions unit was established in 1980, as M&A began to accelerate. By the middle of that decade, the M&A unit generated a third of the firm's revenue. In 2008, the law firm was one of the five that advised on a merger on the tobacco companies Altria and UST. The firm was active in the recovery of the 2008 financial crisis, with then-chairman H. Rodgin Cohen described by the New York Times as having “one of the largest roles” in resolving bailouts and mergers including Bear Sterns and AIG.

The firm advised the cryptocurrency exchange FTX prior to its 2022 collapse and worked in an advisory role following the company’s declaration of bankruptcy. In January 2023, a bipartisan group of four U.S. Senators published a letter arguing that Sullivan & Cromwell had a conflict of interest as FTX bankruptcy counsel due to its significant pre-bankruptcy work. Law Professors Jonathan Lipson and David Skeel argued that as FTX was nearing bankruptcy, Sullivan & Cromwell urged then-CEO Sam Bankman-Fried to transfer control of the company to John J. Ray III by making false promises about Ray's role and failed to suggest that Bankman-Fried and others might face criminal liability. In October 2024, a class-action lawsuit brought by FTX investors against Sullivan & Cromwell was voluntarily dismissed after a U.S. Bankruptcy Examiner found the firm had neither participated in fraud nor overlooked warning signs while representing FTX prior to its bankruptcy filing.

It is one of the most profitable law practices in the world, with 2024 profits per partner exceeding $6.7 million.

In 2024, the firm hired a background check company to scour social media and review news reports and footage from protests. Candidates could face scrutiny even if they weren’t using problematic language but were involved with a protest where others did. Roderick A. Ferguson, a Yale professor of American studies, argued that to "make the leap that it’s all the students", “can mimic racist thinking, sexist thinking, homophobic thinking, that one instance becomes a character of all.”

=== Representation of Donald J. Trump ===
In January 2025, Sullivan & Cromwell announced its representation of Donald J. Trump in the appeal of his conviction on 34 felony counts for paying hush money to porn star Stormy Daniels prior to the 2016 election. In doing so, the firm became the first major law firm to risk its reputation by defending Trump from criminal prosecution, with the New York Times writing, "Some clients might look askance at any affiliation with a polarizing president." Robert Giuffra, co-chair of Sullivan & Cromwell, joined a phone call where President Donald Trump negotiated the targeting of law firms and lawyers under the second Trump administration with the law firm Paul, Weiss as a first among law firms who had discussions with Trump early in his second term. The firm has been reported to be the favored firm of Trump. James McDonald, a partner at the firm, was nominated to be the United States Attorney for the Southern District of New York by Trump.

== International practice ==
The firm's international practice dates back to its early years and the development of America's industrial and transportation infrastructure. Sullivan & Cromwell represented European bankers who were financing the construction of railroads and other elements of the nation's infrastructure. By the turn of the century, the firm Cromwell represented French interests that owned land in Panama and was involved in the financing of the Panama Canal; the firm still represents the Panama Canal Authority to this day.

Sullivan & Cromwell was one of the earliest U.S. firms to open overseas offices, beginning with Paris in 1911. By 1928, offices also were open in Buenos Aires and Berlin. In 1935, Allen Dulles, then a partner in the firm and later Director of Central Intelligence, visited Germany and returned somewhat disturbed by the direction of the regime. Over the sole opposition of Allen's brother and fellow partner, John Foster Dulles, the firm's partners voted in 1935 to close the Berlin office and a subsidiary in Frankfurt. However, later the firm backdated the announcement of the closing of their German offices by one year, to 1934.

Two former chairmen of the firm held senior foreign policy positions during the Eisenhower administration: John Foster Dulles, who served as U.S. Secretary of State; and Arthur Dean, who represented the United States in negotiations resulting in the Korean Armistice Agreement.

== Controversies ==
Under Foster Dulles, the firm assisted Nazi Germany's arms buildup effort by incorporating the German chemical company I.G. Farben into an international nickel cartel alongside American, Canadian, and French companies. The firm was involved in the 1954 coup d'état in Guatemala is documented. At the time, the firm represented the United Fruit Company (UFC), which had major holdings in Guatemala. UFC used its lobbying power, through the firm and through other means, to convince President Eisenhower, as well as Secretary of State John Foster Dulles, and his brother, CIA director Allen Dulles, both former partners of the firm, to depose the democratically elected President of Guatemala, Jacobo Arbenz.

=== Insider trading ===
In 2008, police uncovered an insider trading conspiracy involving a former Sullivan & Cromwell attorney; Toronto Dorsey & Whitney partner Gil Cornblum had discovered inside information at both Sullivan & Cromwell and Dorsey and, with his co-conspirator, a former lawyer and Cornblum's law school classmate, was found to have gained over $10 million in illegal profits over a 14-year span. Cornblum committed suicide by jumping from a bridge as he was under investigation and shortly before he was to be arrested but before criminal charges were laid against him, one day before his alleged co-conspirator pleaded guilty.

=== AI work ===
On April 9, 2026, in representing Prince Global Holdings Limited, the firm submitted AI hallucinations of unvetted, false legal citations to the U.S. Bankruptcy Court for the Southern District of New York, which was discovered by Boies Schiller Flexner; Sullivan & Cromwell later formally apologized to the court, without disclosing any responsible attorney.

In 2026, the firm worked with OpenAI to build AI to analyze contracts and agreements.

== Awards and recognition ==
Sullivan & Cromwell was named Law360 Firm of the Year in January 2025, with eight Practice Group of the Year awards in Banking, Bankruptcy, Fintech, Insurance, Product Liability, Tax, Transportation, and White Collar.

== Notable employees ==
- M. Bernard Aidinoff (partner), chairman of Section of Taxation of the American Bar Association
- Ann Althouse, blogger and professor of law
- Louis Auchincloss, novelist, historian, and essayist
- Michael Bryant, member of the Legislative Assembly of Ontario
- Dhananjaya Y. Chandrachud, 50th Chief Justice of India
- Jay Clayton, chair of the U.S. Securities and Exchange Commission (2017–20), United States attorney for the Southern District of New York (2025-)
- Amal Clooney, human rights lawyer, activist, wife of George Clooney
- H. Rodgin Cohen, corporate lawyer
- Lori Fisler Damrosch, law professor
- Norris Darrell, president of the American Law Institute
- Florence A. Davis, president of the Starr Foundation
- Arthur Dean, lawyer and diplomat
- Michael G. DeSombre, partner and former United States Ambassador to the Thailand
- Allen Welsh Dulles, Director of Central Intelligence (1953–61)
- John Foster Dulles, U.S. Secretary of State (1953–59)
- Ronald Dworkin, philosopher and law professor
- Vicente Blanco Gaspar, lawyer and ambassador
- Robert Giuffra, Co-Chair of Sullivan & Cromwell and a fellow of the American College of Trial Lawyers
- Judith Kaye, former chief judge of the New York Court of Appeals
- Alexandra D. Korry (partner), chair of the New York City Bar Association’s Committee
- Benjamin L. Liebman, law professor
- Robert MacCrate, counsel to Governor Nelson D. Rockefeller and the Department of the Army for its investigation of the My Lai Massacre
- Paul Mahoney, former dean of University of Virginia Law School
- Robert McC. Marsh, member of the New York State Assembly and Justice of the New York Supreme Court
- John O. McGinnis, professor at Northwestern Pritzker School of Law
- Bruce Menin, businessman
- Steven Peikin, co-director of the SEC Enforcement Division (2017–20)
- Keith Rabois, technology entrepreneur and investor
- Frederic C. Rich, author, lawyer, and environmentalist
- Samuel W. Seymour, former president of the New York City Bar Association
- Hans Smit, Columbia Law School professor and mentor of Ruth Bader Ginsburg
- Harlan Fiske Stone, Chief Justice of the United States
- Nadine Strossen, lawyer and activist
- Chuck Sullivan, New England Patriots executive vice president
- Peter Thiel, venture capitalist and co-founder of PayPal
- Joseph Tsai, vice chairman of Alibaba Group
- Jeffrey B. Wall, former principal deputy solicitor general of the United States
- Elizabeth Carroll Wingo, Judge on the Superior Court of the District of Columbia
- Mark Wiseman, BlackRock and Canada Pension Plan Investment Board executive

== See also ==
- List of largest law firms by profits per partner
- White shoe firms
- Tip and Trade
- Insider trading
