= Frederic Rich =

Frederic Rich may refer to:

- Frederic C. Rich (fl. 1980s–2010s), American author, lawyer, and environmentalist
- Fred Rich (1898–1956), Polish-American bandleader and composer

== See also ==
- Frederick Henry Rich (1824–1904), British soldier
