= Simon Eagle =

English stockbroker

Simon Eagle (born 16 August 1958) is an English stockbroker who received a record £2.8m fine for market abuse.

== Early life ==
Eagle was born in London where he was 1 of 5 children. He grew up in North London and lived there until the age of 10 and then moved to Essex, but now lives in Hertfordshire.

Eagle enjoyed photography, so he considered this as a career path but instead spent three years as a ski instructor. At age 22, he decided to change careers again and moved to the city to become a commodity broker. He next became a foreign exchange dealer, then went into bonds trading before he became a headhunter for seven years. He then went into fund management and then finally acquiring stock brokers SP Bell.

== Market abuse ==
In May 2010, the Financial Services Authority fined Eagle £2.8m - the largest ever for an individual - for deliberate market abuse and banned him from working in financial services. The FSA said Eagle was responsible for a complex and prolonged abusive scheme that deliberately set out to ramp up the share price of Fundamental-E Investments (FEI) for his own benefit.

== Charity work ==
Eagle has recently set up a new charity called Escape C22 which is to help homeless people. The basis of the charity is to offer homeless people the chance to live and work on a rural farm. This will provide them with a permanent address, through which they can gain work experience, receive career advice and references enabling them to seek future employment and start rebuilding their lives. They will be offered the opportunity to grow their own food, receive counseling and social rehabilitation. The theme is to escape the "catch 22" of their situation. The money raised would be used to rent a farm, buy minibuses to pick up homeless people and take them to their new home (the farms) where they will embark on this new opportunity. The charity would look to work with food retailers, existing food banks and any other sources of help and care who could assist in giving much needed help to this charity. The crowdfunding was a success and raised a total of £40.
