= Phim mới (website) =

Vietnamese website

- The logo and a corner of phimmoi.net's webpage
- Website type: Pirate movie site
- Available in: Vietnamese
- Owner: Nguyễn Tuấn Tú
- Creator: Cao Thanh Lai Cao Duy Anh
- Revenue: From advertisements
- Website: https://phimmoi.club
- Registration: N/A
- Launched: 2012 (domain registered)

Phim mới (lit. 'New Film') is a Vietnamese website where users can watch movies online without copyright authorization. It is the largest movie site in Vietnam; however, most movies on this website are unauthorized.

According to statistics from Alexa, before being blocked, Phimmoi.net was the website with the largest traffic in Vietnam. Statistics from another website traffic tool, SimilarWeb, shows that Phimmoi.net used to have 60–80 million visits per month.

== Content ==
On Phim mới's site, visitors are able to watch copyrighted movies without the requirement to pay any fee.

phimmoi.net used to use Google's servers to host movies without copyright permission. The site owners spent money buying unlimited Google Drive accounts for students – with prices ranging from 150,000-300,000 VND for storage. However, this method only worked for a while until Google was forced to take measures to prevent it. In addition, the above-mentioned method also incurred high costs and did not guarantee server stability. Therefore, after that incident, the site owners switched to using Facebook's server instead.

phimmoi.net's main revenue came from its huge viewership and online advertising contracts. According to an alleged price list of this website, a 5-second video ad run before a movie premieres could cost up to 18 million VND/ week. At the same time, a balloon ad with the size of 800×500 costed approximately 18 million VND/week. In addition, the surrounding advertising boxes also costed up to 25 million VND/week, and each ad view at the beginning of a movie would earn the site owner 20,000 VND.

== Blocked access in Vietnam ==
On June 17, 2020, many Vietnamese Internet service providers simultaneously blocked access to phimmoi.net. At least 3 Vietnamese Internet service providers have blocked this website (VNPT, MobiFone, and FPT). In 2017, phimmoi.net had all its ads withdrawn in a campaign against pirate websites launched by Vietnam's Ministry of Information and Communications. However, after 1 day of being blocked, phimmoi.net was active again under a new domain name that was almost identical to the old one. Even after having various other domains blocked, the site owners continued to create more domain names – by changing the ".net" extension to ".com", or adding a few letters "z" at the end. According to VnExpress, from mid-June to early July 2020, phimmoi.net bought dozens of different domain names to circumvent censorship.

=== Public reaction ===
The blocking of phimmoi.net has resulted in opposing reactions within the community. Supporters of this website argue that many official movie sites do not have enough content, so it is OK to watch unauthorized movies; while others think that the cost for watching authorized movies is not too high. Some people even commented that phimmoi.net and other similar websites were "advertising platforms for online gambling services".

An article in Mondaq stated that the prosecution of phimmoi.net was an important stepping stone for implementation of copyright laws in Vietnam, and would help "the Vietnamese public better understand the serious consequences of piracy".

According to an article in the Asia Times, the Vietnamese government's action against piracy websites like phimmoi.net would be necessary if it wants to "appeal to more IP-sensitive foreign investors", especially considering the decline in FDI inflows into Vietnam following the new waves of the COVID-19 pandemic.

== Legal actions ==
On August 19, 2021, Ho Chi Minh City's police said that they were investigating acts of crime in the operation of phimmoi.net. According to the investigation's results, in 2014, Nguyễn Tuấn Tú (from Lâm Đồng) planned to build and develop a free online movie website to earn money from advertising. Tú hired Cao Thanh Lai and Cao Duy Anh, who were skilled in information technology, to design, administer and operate the phimmoi.net website. According to article 225 of the Penal Code, Tú's acts may result in a fine of 3 billion VND – along with 3 years of non-custodial re-education.
