= Florence A. Davis =

- Born: February 22, 1955
- Died: May 21, 2023 (aged 68)
- Education: Wellesley College; New York University School of Law (JD)
- Employers: Sullivan & Cromwell; Morgan Stanley
- Known for: President and a member of the Board of Directors of the Starr Foundation, Vice president and general counsel at American International Group (AIG)
- Spouse: Anthony Gooch

Florence Davis (February 22, 1955 – May 21, 2023) was the President and a member of the Board of Directors of the Starr Foundation. She served beginning March 1999 until May 2023.

== Biography ==
Davis graduated Phi Beta Kappa from Wellesley College and then the New York University School of Law where she was a Root-Tilden Scholar. She joined Sullivan & Cromwell in 1979. In 1986, she began working for Morgan Stanley rising to director of worldwide regulatory affairs. In 1995, she became vice president and general counsel at American International Group (AIG). In 1992, she was named to the 40 under 40 list by Crain's New York Business magazine.

== Personal life ==
In August 2009, Davis married Anthony Gooch. She died May 21, 2023, after a lengthy battle with cancer.
