= STOCK Act =

Legislation of the 112th United States Congress

- Long title: An Act To prohibit Members of Congress and employees of Congress from using nonpublic information derived from their official positions for personal benefit, and for other purposes
- Nicknames: Stop Trading on Congressional Knowledge Act of 2012
- Enacted by: the 112th United States Congress
- Effective: April 4, 2012

Citations
- Public law: 112-105
- Statutes at Large: 126 Stat. 291

Legislative history
- Introduced in the Senate as S. 2038 by Joe Lieberman (I–CT) on January 26, 2012; Committee consideration by Senate Homeland Security and Governmental Affairs; Passed the Senate on February 2, 2012 (96–3); Passed the House on February 9, 2012 (417–2) with amendment; Senate agreed to House amendment on March 22, 2012 (unanimous consent); Signed into law by President Barack Obama on April 4, 2012

Major amendments
- Amended by S.716 on April 15, 2013

The Stop Trading on Congressional Knowledge (STOCK) Act of 2012 (Pub. L. 112–105 (text) (PDF), S. 2038, 126 Stat. 291, enacted April 4, 2012) is an act of Congress designed to combat insider trading. It was signed into law by President Barack Obama on April 4, 2012. The law prohibits the use of non-public information for private profit, including insider trading, by members of Congress and other government employees. It confirms changes to the Commodity Exchange Act and specifies reporting intervals for financial transactions.

Originally written and introduced by Washington congressman Brian Baird, the STOCK Act gained popularity following a 60 Minutes segment on congressional insider trading in 2011, after which Republican senator Scott Brown and Democratic senator Kirsten Gillibrand reintroduced bills to combat the practice. In February 2012, the STOCK Act passed in the Senate by a 96–3 vote; the only no votes were senators Jeff Bingaman, Richard Burr, and Tom Coburn. Later the House of Representatives passed it by a 417–2 vote. The bill was supported heavily by vulnerable incumbents and signed into law by President Obama. According to the current United States Senate Select Committee on Ethics, "A member, officer, or employee of the Senate shall not receive any compensation, nor shall he permit any compensation to accrue to his beneficial interest from any source, the receipt or accrual of which would occur by virtue of influence improperly exerted from his position as a member, officer, or employee."

== Background ==
The law is yet another addition to the series of policy created to mandate and regulate the transactions of securities. The Securities Act of 1933 was the first policy created to protect the sale of primary security transactions by companies. Also known as the "Truth in Securities" law, it paved the way to provide investors with more protection and a fair opportunity for their liquid assets. Congress saw the lack of information provided to investors was a large disadvantage to investors and derailed their interest, causing a lack of liquidity in the market during the recovery. It also laid out examples and identified situations of fraudulent activity that has been previously committed by companies. In addition, it provided guidelines for companies with registered publicly held securities to publicly disclose annual and quarterly reports to properly educate their individual investors.

The Ethics in Government Act of 1978 was established decades later to create a code of ethics as a means for political representatives to abide by. Amongst other regulations placed, this piece of legislature also had large implications on the effects of information asymmetry and was intended to create honest and just security transactions. These acts were necessary to prevent fraudulent activity imposed by large corporations and political representatives to which were very capable of hiding information that would benefit their company or their applicable assets.

== Summary ==
The STOCK Act is an original bill to prohibit members of Congress and employees of Congress from using private information derived from their official positions for personal benefit, and for other purposes. With this bill in place, members of Congress are no longer allowed to use information garnered through official business for personal reasons. The Act prohibits members and employees of Congress from using "any nonpublic information derived from the individual's position ... or gained from performance of the individual's duties, for personal benefit". The bill also applies to all employees in the Executive and Judicial branches of the federal government. The STOCK Act required a one-year study of the growing political intelligence industry and requires every Member of Congress to publicly file and disclose any financial transaction of stocks, bond, commodities futures, and other securities within 45 days on their websites, rather than once a year as was required previously. The Act also requires members of Congress and Executive branch officials to disclose the terms of mortgages on their homes, prohibits them from receiving special access to initial public stock offerings, and denies federal pensions to members of Congress who are convicted of felonies involving public corruption. The bill is divided into nineteen sections. The following summary was written by the Congressional Research Service, a nonpartisan arm of the Library of Congress, which serves Congress.

=== Section 3 ===
Requires the congressional ethics committees to issue interpretive guidance of the rules of each chamber, including rules on conflicts of interest and gifts, with respect to the prohibition against the use by members of Congress and congressional employees (including legislative branch officers and employees), as a means for making a private profit, of any nonpublic information derived from their positions as Members or congressional employees, or gained from performance of the individual's official responsibilities.

=== Section 4 ===
Declares that such members and employees are not exempt from the insider trading prohibitions arising under the securities laws, including the Securities Exchange Act of 1934 and Rule 10b-5. Amends the Securities Exchange Act of 1934 to declare that such Members and employees owe a duty arising from a relationship of trust and confidence to Congress, the U.S. government, and U.S. citizens with respect to material, nonpublic information derived from their positions as Members or congressional employees or gained from performance of the individual's official responsibilities.

=== Section 5 ===
Amends the Commodity Exchange Act to apply to members and congressional employees, or to judicial officers or employees its prohibitions against certain transactions, involving the purchase or sale of any commodity in interstate commerce, or for future delivery, or any swap.

=== Section 6 ===
Amends the Ethics in Government Act of 1978 (EGA) to require specified individuals to file reports within 30 to 45 days after receiving notice of a purchase, sale, or exchange which exceeds $1,000 in stocks, bonds, commodities futures, and other forms of securities, subject to any waivers and exclusions. Lists such individuals as: (1) the President; (2) the Vice President; (3) executive officers or employees, including certain special government employees and members of a uniformed service; (4) appointed administrative law judges; (5) executive branch employees in positions excepted from the competitive service because of their confidential or policymaking character (except those excluded from such exception by the Director of the Office of Government Ethics [OGE]); (6) the Postmaster General, the Deputy Postmaster General, each Governor of the Board of Governors of the U.S. Postal Service, and certain U.S. Postal Service officers or employees; (7) the OGE Director and each designated agency ethics official; (8) civilian employees of the Executive Office of the President (other than a special government employee) appointed by the President; (9) Members of Congress; and (10) congressional officers and employees.

=== Section 7 ===
Directs the comptroller general to report to specified congressional committees on the role of political intelligence in the financial markets.

=== Section 8 ===
Requires the secretary of the senate, the sergeant at arms of the Senate, and the clerk of the House of Representatives, by August 31, 2012, or 90 days after the enactment of this Act, to ensure that financial disclosure forms filed by members, candidates for Congress, and congressional officers and employees, in calendar year 2012 and in subsequent years be made available to the public on the respective official Senate and House websites within 30 days after filing. Terminates such requirement upon implementation of the following public disclosure systems. Directs the secretary, the sergeant at arms, and the clerk to develop systems to enable the electronic filing of such reports as well as their on-line public availability. Amends EGA to revise the retention period for mandatory public availability of financial disclosure reports. Requires retention and public availability of the financial disclosure reports of a Member of Congress until six years after the date the individual ceases to be a Member (currently, six years after receipt of the report).

=== Section 9 ===
Requires the OGE to issue interpretive guidance of the relevant federal ethics statutes and regulations, including the Standards of Ethical Conduct for executive branch employees, to specify that no such individual may use non-public information derived from his or her position or gained from the performance of official responsibilities as a means for making a private profit. Requires the U.S. Judicial Conference to issue interpretive guidance of similar ethics rules, including the Code of Conduct for U.S. Judges, applicable to: (1) federal judges, and (2) judicial employees. Declares that executive branch employees, judicial officers, and judicial employees are not exempt from the insider trading prohibitions arising under the securities laws, including the Securities Exchange Act of 1934 and Rule 10b-5. Amends the Securities Exchange Act of 1934 to declare that such individuals owe a duty arising from a relationship of trust and confidence to the federal government and U.S. citizens with respect to material, nonpublic information derived from their positions as executive branch employees, judicial officers, or judicial employees gained from performance of the individual's official responsibilities.

=== Section 11 ===
Directs the president to ensure that financial disclosure forms filed in calendar year 2012 and in subsequent years by executive branch employees are publicly available on appropriate official websites of executive branch agencies within 30 days after such forms are filed. Requires the OGE director to develop systems to enable electronic filing and public access to these financial disclosure forms.

=== Section 12 ===
Amends the Securities Exchange Act of 1934 to prohibit individuals required to file financial disclosure reports under EGA from purchasing securities that are the subject of an initial public offering in any manner other than is available to members of the public generally.

=== Section 13 ===
Amends EGA to require the financial disclosure report of the following individuals to include any secured mortgage which is their personal residence or that of his or her spouse: (1) the president, the vice president, members of Congress; and (2) certain individuals nominated for appointments as executive branch officers or employees (except those nominated to positions as foreign service officers or a grade or rank in the uniformed services with a pay grade of 0-6 or below).

=== Section 14 ===
Declares that the transaction reporting requirements established by this Act shall not be construed to apply to a widely held investment fund (whether a mutual fund, regulated investment company, pension or deferred compensation plan, or other investment fund): (1) if the fund is publicly traded or its assets are widely diversified, and (2) the reporting individual neither exercises control over nor has the ability to exercise control over the financial interests held by the fund.

=== Section 15 ===
Denies Civil Service Retirement System (CSRS) or Federal Employees' Retirement System (FERS) retirement benefits (other than a lump-sum reimbursement of personal contributions) to the President, the Vice President, or an elected official of a state or local government, if convicted of certain felonies.

=== Section 16 ===
Prohibits senior executives at the Federal National Mortgage Association (Fannie Mae) and the Federal Home Loan Mortgage Corporation (Freddie Mac) (government-sponsored enterprises [GSEs]) from receiving bonuses during any period of conservatorship on or after the enactment of this Act.

=== Section 17 ===
Prohibits an individual required to file a financial disclosure report under EGA from directly negotiating or having any agreement of future employment or compensation without filing a signed disclosure statement, within three business days after commencement of the negotiation or agreement, with the individual's supervising ethics office. Requires such an individual to recuse himself or herself whenever there is or there appears to be a conflict of interest with respect to the subject matter of the statement. Requires the individual, upon such a recusal, to notify the supervising ethics office and submit the relevant disclosure statement.

=== Section 18 ===
Amends the federal criminal code to subject to a fine or imprisonment of up to 15 years, or both, as well as possible disqualification from holding federal office, certain covered government persons, in addition to members of Congress and congressional employees, who with the intent to influence, on the basis of partisan political affiliation, an employment decision or employment practice of any private entity: (1) takes or withholds, or offers or threatens to take or withhold, an official act; or (2) influences, or offers or threatens to influence, the official act of another. Extends the meaning of "covered government person" (currently restricted to members of Congress and congressional employees) to include the president, vice president, an employee of the U.S. Postal Service or the Postal Regulatory Commission, or any other executive branch employee.

=== Section 19 ===
Makes conforming amendments to EGA and the Honest Leadership and Open Government Act of 2007. Requires retention and public availability of the financial disclosure reports of members of the House until six years after the date an individual ceases to be a member of Congress (currently, six years after receipt of the report).

== Reception ==
Overall, the STOCK Act has garnered positive support from both houses of Congress. However, guarded optimism has been expressed by politicians such as Eric Weissmann. Weissmann, a candidate for Congress in Colorado's 2nd Congressional District, recently claimed that STOCK was long overdue and that "The passage of the STOCK Act by both the House and Senate is a good first step in deterring these abusive practices, but doesn't go far enough to protect the American people from members of Congress who chose to act with self-interest over public good."

Other examples of positive support for STOCK include President Obama who upon signing the bill reassured that congressional members must play by the same rules as regular citizens. Obama regards the STOCK act as a way to monitor congressional activity and create transparency within the branch. He spoke to this point by adding, "It's the notion that the powerful shouldn't get to create one set of rules for themselves and another set of rules for everybody else. ... If we expect that to apply to our biggest corporations and our most successful citizens, it certainly should apply to our elected officials."

As a result of the economic disruption caused by the COVID-19 pandemic, there are new calls to expand or reform the STOCK Act. There have been several reports by various prominent news agencies of alleged violations of the STOCK act by members of Congress. Analysis in 2021 by Business Insider shows fifty four members of Congress, executive officials, and numerous staffers violating the STOCK Act. As of 2021, in the approximately nine month period up to September 2021, Senate and House members disclosed 4,000 trades worth at least $315 million of stocks and bonds. The list of alleged violations include members from both parties. A majority of respondents supported a ban for members of Congress to hold individual stocks as shown in a recent poll conducted in March 2020. Support for the ban appears to be bipartisan and ideologically agnostic as the demographic representation of the poll results present.

The real world effectiveness of the STOCK Act at curbing insider trading is up for debate. Insider trading laws which already existed to stop such practices lack specific definitions making them difficult to enforce; the STOCK Act attempts to rectify this but critics argue it does not do enough. The enforcement of the STOCK Act is left up to the executive branch which may be reluctant to pursue cases against the legislature because of concerns regarding the separation of powers and the inherent imbalance this may present if executive were to abuse the law. This can lead to a situation where the most egregious cases are pursued while milder cases which may be difficult to define are not pursued. A recent study did not find a difference between the expected returns of public equities owned by public officials tracked between 2012 and 2020 when compared to randomly choosing stocks, suggesting that public officials either did not engage in insider trading or if they did, it did not result in better returns than if they had chosen stocks randomly.

== Amendment ==
An amendment to the STOCK act, S. 716, was introduced Senator Harry Reid on April 11, 2013. This amendment modifies the online disclosure portion of the STOCK Act, so that congressional staff and certain executive branch officers and employees were no longer required to publicly report financial disclosure statements online. Although the amendment specifically did not alter the reporting requirements for the President, Vice President, members of Congress, or congressional candidates, the amendment also eliminated the requirement for the creation of searchable, sortable database of information in reports, and the requirement that reports be done in electronic format, rather than on paper, effectively making the internet filing portion of the bill optional and limiting public access. The reasoning for this change was to prevent criminals from gaining access to the financial data and using it against affected persons. It was considered by the Senate and passed by unanimous consent the same day. On April 12, in the House, S.716 received only 14 seconds of discussion before being passed by unanimous consent; it was signed into law by President Obama on April 15, 2013.

The main provision that was repealed would have required about 28,000 senior government officials to post their financial information online, something that had been strongly criticized by federal government employee unions. A report by the National Academy of Public Administration, published in March 2013, said that the provision could threaten the safety of government employees abroad, as well as make it difficult to attract and retain public sector employees.

Lisa Rosenberg of the nonprofit public interest group the Sunlight Foundation criticized the repeal, stating that it "undermines the intent" of the original legislation, and said "Are we going to return to the days when the public can use the Internet to research everything except what their government is doing?".
