= Alexandra Korry =

American lawyer, civil rights advocate and educator (1959–2020)

Alexandra D. Korry
- Born: 11 March 1959; London, UK
- Died: September 29, 2020 (aged 61); Westport, Connecticut, US
- Education: Harvard University (BA); London School of Economics (LLM)
- Occupations: Lawyer, civil rights advocate, educator
- Spouse: Robin Panovka
- Children: 2

Alexandra D. Korry (March 11, 1959 – September 29, 2020) was an American mergers and acquisitions lawyer, civil rights advocate and educator.

== Early life and education ==
Korry was born in London, England, to Edward and Patricia Korry. Her father, Edward Korry, was a journalist who later became the U.S. ambassador to Ethiopia and Chile, where she spent her childhood. Her mother Patricia Korry was a granddaughter of Nathan L. Miller who was Governor of New York.

Korry earned her bachelor's degree in 1979 from Harvard University. While at Harvard, she became the second female managing editor of The Harvard Crimson. In 1980, she received her master's degree in international relations from the London School of Economics; after working briefly as a reporter at Newsweek and The Washington Post, she graduated from the Duke University School of Law in 1986.

== Career ==
Following graduating from Duke Law School, Korry joined Sullivan & Cromwell. In 1993, she was among the first women elected partners in the firm's Mergers and Acquisition Group. She was recognized as one of the leading corporate lawyers in the US, advising on major transactions on Wall Street, and in 2021 Lawdragon included Korry in its 2021 Lawdragon 500 Hall of Fame.

She served as the head of the New York State Advisory Committee to the United States Commission on Civil Rights. She led the Committee to publish influential reports on educational equity, solitary confinement, and police accountability. Her report issued in December 2014 helped end solitary confinement of juveniles in New York.

Korry was chair of the New York City Bar Association’s Committee on Mergers, Acquisitions and Corporate Control Contests and served on the Board of Visitors at Duke Law School and the Dean's Advisory Council at Radcliffe Institute for Advanced Study at Harvard. She was also chair of the Harlem Educational Activities Fund, an after-school program for under-served youth in New York.

Korry was a regular lecturer on mergers and acquisitions at Columbia Law School as an adjunct professor.

In 2021, scholarships were established by Harlem Educational Activities Fund (HEAF) and Duke Law School to honor her contributions. The Duke Korry Fellows program is competitively awarded to eight students each year, to assist them in pursuing civil rights work, in recognition of Alexandra Korry’s outstanding pro bono civil rights work and her contribution to ending juvenile solitary confinement.

== Personal life ==
Korry was married to Robin Panovka, a mergers and acquisitions partner at Wachtell, Lipton, Rosen & Katz, and had two daughters. Korry died on September 29, 2020, at her home in Westport, Connecticut, of ovarian cancer.
