= Robert Giuffra =

American attorney

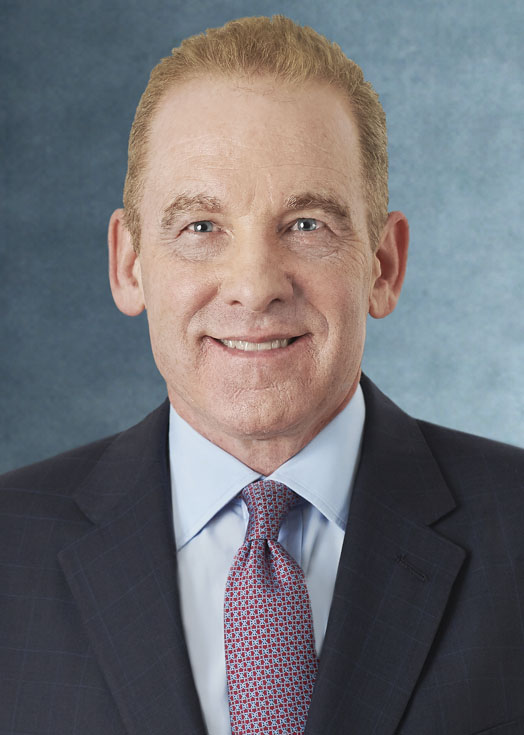
- Born: 1959 or 1960 (age 66–67)
- Education: Princeton University (BA); Yale University (JD)
- Employer: Sullivan & Cromwell
- Spouse: Joyce Campbell (m. 1998)
- Children: 3

Robert Joseph Giuffra Jr. (born 1959 or 1960) is an American attorney. He is co-chair and a partner of Sullivan & Cromwell in New York, and is a member of their management committee. He is Donald Trump's appellate lawyer.

== Personal life and education ==
Giuffra graduated from Bronxville (N.Y.) High School in 1978. He earned his bachelor's degree summa cum laude and Phi Beta Kappa from Princeton University's Woodrow Wilson School of Public and International Affairs in 1983. Giuffra graduated from Yale Law School in 1987. In 1998, Giuffra married Joyce Campbell, a former press secretary for Senator Bob Dole. The Giuffras have three children (Elizabeth, Caroline and Robert Giuffra III) and live in Manhattan and Southampton.

== Career ==
Giuffra served as a law clerk to Judge Ralph Winter of the United States Court of Appeals for the Second Circuit from 1987 to 1988 and to Chief Justice William Rehnquist of the United States Supreme Court from 1988 to 1989. He joined Sullivan & Cromwell in 1989.

Giuffra represented Robert Wallach, counsel to former U.S. Attorney General Edwin Meese, in obtaining the dismissal of his conviction in the Wedtech case; Armand D'Amato, the brother of then-Senator Alfonse D'Amato, in securing the reversal of his mail fraud conviction; David Duncan, the former Arthur Andersen LLP partner who served as lead auditor for Enron and whose guilty plea was later vacated by a federal court; Vornado Chairman and CEO Steven Roth at trial and on appeal.

In 2011, Giuffra served as the lead counsel to a group of leading financial institutions in separate actions in New York State court against MBIA challenging its 2009 restructuring, winning the appeal in the New York State Court of Appeals. In 2003 and 2004, Giuffra served as counsel to the Audit Committee of Computer Associates. He later represented Computer Associates in settling investigations by the Department of Justice and SEC.

In 2014, Giuffra represented Enbridge in obtaining a unanimous jury verdict dismissing Energy Transfer Partners’ claims seeking more than $1 billion in damages from Enbridge based on alleged tortious interference with a pipeline project.

In 2015, Giuffra represented The New York State Bankers Association, which sued in federal court to overturn New York City's Responsible Banking Act, legislation that sought to regulate the activities of banks receiving deposits from the City. Judge Katherine Polk Failla of the United States District Court for the Southern District of New York struck down the law.

During 2015, Giuffra also represented DISH Network and EchoStar in obtaining the dismissal of tortious interference claims seeking billions of dollars in damages in an adversary proceeding begun in connection with LightSquared’s Chapter 11 cases.

In March 2017, Giuffra obtained the dismissal with prejudice of a multibillion-dollar putative class action against UBS by Enron shareholders who asserted that UBS bankers knew, and failed to disclose, relevant information about the energy company's finances.

Giuffra represented Fiat Chrysler Automobiles in its litigation with the U.S. Department of Justice, Environmental Protection Agency and California Air Resources Board and class action plaintiffs over alleged violations of diesel vehicle emissions regulations. In 2019, Fiat Chrysler reached final settlements to resolve those cases.

Giuffra was counsel for Volkswagen AG in the multi-district litigation arising from government investigations into the automaker's use of defeat device software. He negotiated a $14.7 billion settlement with U.S. federal and state regulators and class action plaintiffs. He since has secured the dismissal of related cases brought by the states of Alabama, Tennessee, Minnesota, Wyoming and Missouri alleging violation of state environmental laws.

Giuffra reportedly was one of the attorneys who declined to represent President Donald Trump in special counsel Robert Mueller's investigation of Russian efforts to interfere with the 2016 U.S. presidential election. Giuffra has represented former Deputy National Security Advisor K. T. McFarland in connection with the Mueller investigation. He reportedly persuaded federal investigators that McFarland had not intentionally misled them about her exchanges with former National Security Advisor Michael Flynn regarding conversations with Russian Ambassador Sergey Kislyak concerning sanctions targeting the Russian government.

In 2022, Giuffra represented Allianz when the SEC and DOJ investigated the "Structured Alpha" funds managed by Allianz. Guiffra helped Allianz reach a settlement with a guilty plea of $6 billion in payments to investors and government authorities.

Giuffra represented Goldman Sachs in Goldman Sachs Group, Inc. v. Arkansas Teacher Retirement System, which was a $13 billion class action lawsuit seeking damages after the 2008 financial crisis. Following 13 years of litigation, Giuffra and his team successfully reversed the decision from a lower court to end the case in favor of Goldmans Sachs in 2023.

In 2025, Giuffra represented FirstEnergy to end a class action from the company's involvement in an Ohio bribery scandal in 2023.

In August 2026, Giuffra represented Indian businessman Gautam Adani in a federal fraud case that was dismissed after the Department of Justice dropped the charges.

In 2026, Giuffra was successful in a court decision by the U.S. Court of Appeals for the Second Circuit to overturn a $16.1 billion judgment in 2023 by the Southern District of New York against the nation of Argentina. Giuffra was lead counsel for Argentina in the case involving claims from former shareholders of Argentinian oil company YPF, which was nationalized in 2012.

In October 2026, Giuffra represented Optum before the United States Court of Appeals for the Sixth Circuit, which resulted in a mandamus order denying approximately 800 plaintiffs the right to add new claims in multidistrict opioid litigation.

=== Donald Trump's appellate lawyer ===
At Sullivan & Cromwell, Giuffra is currently leading the appeal against the prosecution of Donald Trump in New York, which had produced a criminal conviction and unconditional discharge in January 2025.

In 2025, Giuffra sat in on a meeting where President Donald Trump negotiated an agreement with the law firm Paul, Weiss which he had targeted as part of a larger retaliation campaign against law firms that represented his political opponents. Giuffra drafted an agreement where Paul, Weiss would give into various of Trump's demands.

In May 2026, the New York Times reported that the Department of Justice under the second Donald Trump administration was in the process of dropping bribery charges against Gautam Adani, an Indian billionaire. This came in the wake of Adani hiring a new legal team led by Giuffra.

== Public service and political activities ==
Giuffra served as a White House aide during the administration of President Ronald Reagan. Giuffra served as chief counsel to the Senate Committee on Banking, Housing, and Urban Affairs from 1995 to 1996, helping to draft the Private Securities Litigation Reform Act of 1995. Giuffra served as counsel to the Senate Whitewater Committee.

Governors of both parties have appointed Giuffra to state government positions. Giuffra served on the New York State Commission on Public Integrity from 2007 to 2009, overseeing state government ethics and lobbying laws. He also served as a commissioner of the New York State Ethics Commission from 1998 to 2007. Giuffra also served as president of the Federal Bar Council from 2008-10. He is Chair of the Board of Advisors of the Yale Law School Center for the Study of Corporate Law and a member of the Board of Trustees of Catholic Charities of New York. He is the Chairman of the American Swiss Foundation.

Giuffra is a Fellow of the American College of Trial Lawyers and the International Academy of Trial Lawyers. In 2017, The American Lawyer named him “Transatlantic Disputes/Regulatory Lawyer of the Year” for his representation of Volkswagen, and in 2014 “Litigator of the Year” for his work in defending UBS and Porsche. In 2011, he was named one of 10 leading U.S. legal innovators by the Financial Times. In 2019, he received the Judge Simon H. Rifkind Award.

== See also ==
- List of law clerks for the chief justice of the United States
