= Big boy letter =

Information waiver in the sale process for some financial instruments

A big boy letter is a pre-sale agreement in connection with a private sale of securities (such as in a PIPE transaction) not to sue over non-disclosure of material inside information that is not disclosed, entered into between two sophisticated parties. Big boy provisions may also be contained within securities purchase agreements, rather than being the subject of a separate letter agreement. Generally, a seller's request that a buyer agree to a big boy letter is a signal to the sophisticated buyer that there is likely to be material non-public information that exists concerning a security, which could give rise to a lawsuit brought by the buyer if it was not disclosed, in the absence of the letter.

== Controversy ==
The legality of big boy letters themselves in the United States Securities markets is a matter of dispute. This is because the primary lawsuit parties seek to avoid with such letters is one under the Securities Exchange Act of 1934, which contains a provision, Section 29(a), that waivers of liability for securities fraud are void. The United States Court of Appeals for the Second Circuit, which includes the financial district of New York, has enforced agreements similar to big boy letters strictly against the buyer. The United States Court of Appeals for the Third Circuit, which includes Delaware, which is the state of incorporation for many publicly held companies, has given greater weight to the anti-waiver provisions of the Securities Exchange Act, although it has not completely ignored these agreements in considering all facts and circumstances of a transaction. As of 2008, Commissioners and staff from the Securities and Exchange Commission have expressed concern about the legal enforceability of big boy letters. Two commissioners have stated that even if the letters provide a defense in private securities litigation, that they are not a defense in an SEC enforcement action.

Even more controversial than the letters themselves is the practice of buying securities subject to a big boy letter and then reselling the securities to a third party without disclosing the existence of the big boy letter. This practice is the subject of ongoing litigation and debate among persons familiar with securities markets. Some argue that there is no duty to disclose the existence of the letter, because the seller does not have any specific information. Others argue that there is a duty to disclose the existence of a big boy letter because it strongly suggests that some material non-public information exists, even if the exact nature of that information is unknown, and that this practice, in effect, constitutes insider trading.
