= Tip and Trade =

Book by Mark Coakley

- Author: Mark Coakley
- Language: English
- Genre: True crime
- Publisher: ECW Press
- Publication date: April 2011
- Publication place: Canada
- Pages: 381 pp.
- ISBN: 978-1-55022-986-8
- OCLC: 676725216

Tip and Trade is a 2011 true crime book by Canadian author Mark Coakley, that depicts an insider trading conspiracy involving Wall Street lawyer Gil Cornblum who had worked at Sullivan & Cromwell and was working at Dorsey & Whitney, and a former lawyer, Stan Grmovsek, who were found to have gained over $10 million in illegal profits over a 14-year span. The crime was detected in 2008. Cornblum committed suicide by jumping from a bridge as he was under investigation and shortly before he was to be arrested but before criminal charges were laid against him, one day before his alleged co-conspirator Grmovsek pled guilty. Grmovsek pleaded guilty and was sentenced to 39 months in prison; this was the longest term ever imposed for insider trading in Canada.

== Reception ==
Canada's national newspaper, The Globe and Mail, called Tip and Trade "riveting." A review by Quill & Quire was negative, stating that "the reader gets the impression that Coakley himself barely cares about his subject." Canadian Lawyer called it "compelling," and the Winnipeg Free Press called it "a helluva tale, if uneven in spots."
