= Christian Nation (novel) =

2013 alternate history novel by Frederic Rich

- Author: Frederic C. Rich
- Language: English
- Genre: Alternate history Political fiction Dystopian fiction
- Publisher: W. W. Norton & Company
- Publication date: 2013
- Publication place: United States
- Media type: Print (Hardback)
- Pages: 352 pages
- ISBN: 0393240118
- OCLC: 915980340
- Dewey Decimal: 813/.6
- LC Class: PS3618.I33275 C48 2013

Christian Nation is a 2013 alternate history novel by American author Frederic Rich. It was Rich's first published novel.

The book is set in a dystopian alternate timeline where John McCain defeats Barack Obama in the 2008 United States presidential election, and Sarah Palin takes over after McCain's death early in his term. Palin's presidency becomes increasingly authoritarian and eventually leads to a Dominionist insurgency and theocracy; the narrator of the book is a former lawyer who recounts the rise of the regime and resistance efforts, particularly by the state of New York.

== Setting ==
The novel is set in an alternate history where the United States has been transformed into an authoritarian Christian theocracy. Within an hour of the new president's Independence Day speech, a series of fifty policies, collectively called "The Blessing," were put into law. These not only removed the separation of church and state, but outlawed things such as abortion, homosexuality, pornography, socialism and trade unions. While religious freedom is still allowed on paper, the country has effectively outlawed all other faiths; Jews are given five years to convert to Christianity or they will be deported to Israel. Atheists, pagans and unmarried women, while not actively persecuted, are forbidden from serving in any positions of power, even as teachers in schools.

Homosexuals are routinely demonized and scapegoated by the new government, with propaganda citing the Gay Nazis myth and blaming them for the spread of AIDS. Opposition by secular powers was brutally suppressed through military action, called the Holy War, the most violent of which was the firebombing of San Francisco's Castro district, killing 12,000 people, mostly gay men. This turned the country into a Pariah state, with all nations but Israel severing diplomatic ties. Nations such as Canada, Norway, Australia and New Zealand have granted refugee status to any Americans fleeing the country. Roughly 4% of the country's population fled before the borders were closed.

By 2029, mass surveillance is routine. Anyone using the Internet, now called the Purity Web, has their keystrokes logged by any computer and phone. All publishing is now done electronically to ensure that it can be screened for "Satanic" content. Devices not connected to the Web, such as typewriters, can still be used freely. The Faith and Freedom Coalition has merged with Fox News to form Fox Faith & Freedom News, or "F3." This channel serves as the propaganda arm of the new American government.

After American troops were recalled from abroad, a Shia revolution swept through the Middle East, with tacit approval from the US as long as Israel is left untouched, overthrowing the House of Saud and establishing a new Islamic Caliphate stretching from Iran to North Africa. Opposed to both globalization and modernity, this new caliphate has cut off 60% of the world's oil supplies, destabilizing the economies of many developing nations. Even in the U.S., the lack of oil has led to fewer cars on the streets and clouds of smog as major cities are forced to burn coal for energy.

As a result, China has now become the dominant power in the Pacific. Japan, South Korea, Southeast Asia and Australia have entered into an economic and military compact called the Greater China Cooperation Area. Similarly, with the collapse of NATO and a growing need for energy, most of Europe, aside from the United Kingdom and Scandinavia, has entered a state of Finlandization under Russian authority.

In a quid pro quo solution, America has recognized these new powers and remains on peaceful terms with them, so long as Israel (now an ultra-orthodox Jewish theocracy) is left alone. The theocratic American government believes the gathering together of Jews in the holy land is a crucial step in preparation for the Second Coming.
