= Anthony Chiasson =

American hedge fund manager

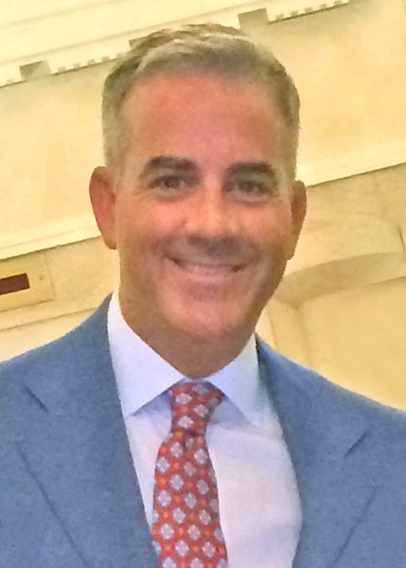
- Born: August 27, 1973 (age 53)
- Education: Babson College (B.S.)
- Occupation: Hedge fund manager

Anthony R. Chiasson (born August 27, 1973) is an American hedge fund manager and co-founder of Level Global Investors LP, a Greenwich, Connecticut-based hedge fund management firm. Level Global was launched in 2003 with about $500 million in assets under management, and grew to $4.2 billion in assets and 75 employees before closing in early 2011.

Chiasson was convicted of insider trading in December 2012, but the conviction was subsequently overturned in a unanimous decision by a three-judge panel of the United States Court of Appeals for the Second Circuit on December 10, 2014. The Supreme Court of the United States denied the Justice Department's request to review the case on October 5, 2015. The appeal court ruling and the dismissal of the indictment against Chiasson stand.

== Early life ==
Chiasson grew up in Portland, Maine and attended Cheverus High School. In 1995, Chiasson received a Bachelor of Science degree from Babson College, where he graduated summa cum laude.

== Career ==
Chiasson began his career on Wall Street at Salomon Brothers in the equity research department, and in 1999, he joined SAC Capital Advisors as a senior technology analyst.

Chiasson co-founded Level Global Investors LP in 2003. In 2010, Goldman Sachs’ Petershill Fund bought a minority stake in the business. Level Global had about $500 million in assets under management when it launched and grew to $4.2 billion in assets at its peak. The firm had 75 employees. Level Global’s growth was primarily driven by institutional investors including, New York State Common Retirement Fund, Aetna Inc., and Cornell University.

== Personal life and philanthropy ==
Chiasson is married and has two children. His family resides in New York City.

Chiasson served on the board of his alma mater, Cheverus High School.

Chiasson also served on the board of trustees of Babson College, having been appointed in 2008. In 2009, Chiasson made a gift to Babson College to fund the Summer Venture Program. The program is an intensive 10-week "boot camp for entrepreneurs" who receive an array of support services and mentoring from professors and local business leaders. Chiasson also funded a Presidential Scholarship at Babson which was geared towards supporting need-based students from the State of Maine who are committed to pursuing a career in business.

== Controversy ==
In early 2012, federal prosecutors from the U.S Attorney's Office for the Southern District of New York alleged that Anthony Chiasson, Todd Newman, a former portfolio manager at Diamondback Capital Management LLC and others, made illegal stock trades based on corporate secrets about Dell Inc. and Nvidia Corporation. Diamondback Capital agreed to pay $9 million to settle with the SEC and Justice Department. Chiasson was found guilty of conspiracy and multiple counts of securities fraud on December 17, 2012.

Chiasson and Newman appealed their convictions to the United States Court of Appeals for the Second Circuit, located in Manhattan, which heard oral arguments on April 22, 2014. On December 10, 2014, the three-judge panel unanimously overturned the convictions of Chiasson and his co-defendant Todd Newman, finding that the government failed to prove they engaged in insider trading. The Appeals Court said the Government presented no evidence that he engaged in insider trading and that the judge misread the law. On April 16, 2015, the judge dismissed the indictment, and Chiasson was exonerated. This was the first time an appeals court has overturned convictions in connection with the Justice Department's crackdown on insider trading. The priority the department placed on insider trading has been met with criticism by some editorial boards and commentators. U.S. Attorney for the Southern District of New York, Preet Bharara, characterized the legal rationale supporting Chiasson's unanimous acquittal as "dramatically wrong" and filed a request for reconsideration by the three-judge panel that heard the appeal or for a rehearing en banc. Both requests were denied without comment on April 3, 2015. On April 16, 2015, the judge dismissed the indictments, and both Chiasson and Newman were exonerated. The Supreme Court of the United States denied the Justice Department's request to review the case on October 5, 2015. The appeal court ruling and the dismissal of the indictment against Chiasson stand.

== See also ==
- Chip Skowron, hedge fund portfolio manager convicted of insider trading
