= Insider trading =

Trading using nonpublic information

Insider trading is the trading of a public company's stock or other securities (such as bonds or stock options) based on material, nonpublic information about the company. In many countries, trading based on insider information is illegal. The rationale for this prohibition of insider trading differs between countries and regions. Some view it as unfair to other investors in the market who do not have access to the information, as the investor with inside information can potentially make larger profits than an investor without such information. Insider trading is also prohibited to prevent the directors of a company (the insiders) from abusing a company's confidential information for the directors' personal gain.

The rules governing insider trading are complex and vary significantly from country to country, as does the extent of enforcement. The definition of 'insider' in one jurisdiction can be broad and may cover not only insiders themselves but also any persons related to them, such as brokers, associates, and even family members. In some jurisdictions, a person who becomes aware of non-public information and then trades on that basis may be guilty of a crime.

Trading by specific insiders, such as employees, is commonly permitted as long as it does not rely on material information not available to the general public. Many jurisdictions require that such trading be reported so the transactions can be monitored. In the United States and several other jurisdictions, trading conducted by corporate officers, key employees, directors, or significant shareholders must be reported to the regulator or publicly disclosed, usually within a few business days of the trade. In such cases, insiders in the United States are required to file Form 4 with the U.S. Securities and Exchange Commission (SEC) when buying or selling shares of their own companies. The authors of one study concluded that illegal insider trading raises the cost of capital for securities issuers, thus decreasing overall economic growth. On the other hand, some economists, such as Henry Manne, have argued that insider trading should be allowed and can, in fact, benefit markets.

There has long been "considerable academic debate" among business and legal scholars over whether insider trading should be illegal. Several arguments against outlawing insider trading have been identified: for example, although insider trading is illegal, most insider trading is never detected by law enforcement, and thus the illegality of insider trading might give the public the potentially misleading impression that "stock market trading is an unrigged game that anyone can play." Some legal analysis has questioned whether insider trading actually harms anyone in the legal sense, since it can be argued either that insider trading does not cause anyone to suffer an actual "loss" or that anyone who suffers a loss is not owed an actual legal duty by the insiders in question. Opponents of political insider trading also point to conflicts of interest and social distrust.

== Legal framework ==
Rules prohibiting or criminalizing insider trading on material non-public information exist in most jurisdictions around the world (Bhattacharya and Daouk, 2002), but the details and the efforts to enforce them vary considerably. In the United States, Sections 16(b) and 10(b) of the Securities Exchange Act of 1934 directly and indirectly address insider trading. The U.S. Congress enacted this law after the stock market crash of 1929. While the United States is generally viewed as making the most serious efforts to enforce its insider trading laws, the broader scope of the European model legislation provides a stricter framework against illegal insider trading. In the European Union and the United Kingdom, all trading on non-public information is, under the rubric of market abuse, subject at a minimum to civil penalties and possible criminal penalties as well. UK's Financial Conduct Authority has the responsibility to investigate and prosecute insider dealing, defined by the Criminal Justice Act 1993.

Financial Action Task Force on Money Laundering (FATF) can apply to domestic politically exposed persons.

=== Definition of "insider" ===
In the United States, Canada, Australia, Germany and Romania for mandatory reporting purposes, corporate insiders are defined as a company's officers, directors and any beneficial owners of more than 10% of a class of the company's equity securities. Trades made by these types of insiders in the company's own stock, based on material non-public information, are considered fraudulent since the insiders are violating the fiduciary duty that they owe to the shareholders. The corporate insider, simply by accepting employment, has undertaken a legal obligation to the shareholders to put the shareholders' interests before their own, in matters related to the corporation. When insiders buy or sell based on company-owned information, they are said to be violating their obligation to the shareholders or investors.

For example, illegal insider trading would occur if the chief executive officer of Company A learned (prior to a public announcement) that Company A would be taken over and then bought shares in Company A while knowing that the share price would likely rise. In the United States and many other jurisdictions, "insiders" are not just limited to corporate officials and major shareholders where illegal insider trading is concerned but can include any individual who trades shares based on material non-public information in violation of some duty of trust. This duty may be imputed; for example, in many jurisdictions, in cases where a corporate insider "tips" a friend about non-public information likely to have an effect on the company's share price, the duty the corporate insider owes the company is now imputed to the friend and the friend violates a duty to the company if he trades on the basis of this information.

=== Liability ===
Liability for inside trading violations generally cannot be avoided by passing on the information in an "I scratch your back; you scratch mine" or quid pro quo arrangement if the person receiving the information knew or should have known that the information was material non-public information. In the United States, at least one court has indicated that the insider who releases the non-public information must have done so for an improper purpose. In the case of a person who receives the insider information (called the "tippee"), the tippee must also have been aware that the insider released the information for an improper purpose.

One commentator has argued that if Company A's CEO did not trade on undisclosed takeover news, but instead passed the information on to his brother-in-law who traded on it, illegal insider trading would still have occurred (albeit by proxy, by passing it on to a "non-insider" so Company A's CEO would not get his hands dirty).

=== Misappropriation theory ===
The misappropriation theory of insider trading is now accepted in U.S. law. It states that anyone who misappropriates material non-public information and trades on that information in any stock may be guilty of insider trading. This can include elucidating material non-public information from an insider with the intention of trading on it or passing it on to someone who will. This theory constitutes the background for the securities regulation that enforces the insider trading. Disgorgement represents ill-gotten gains (or losses avoided) resulting from individuals violating the securities laws. In general in the countries where the insider trading is forbidden, the competent Authority seeks disgorgement to ensure that securities law violators do not profit from their illegal activity. When appropriate, the disgorged funds are returned to the injured investors. Disgorgements can be ordered in either administrative proceedings or civil actions, and the cases can be settled or litigated. Payment of disgorgement can be either completely or partially waived based on the defendant demonstrating an inability to pay. In settled administrative proceedings, Enforcement may recommend, if appropriate, that the disgorgement be waived. There are several approaches in order to quantify the disgorgement; an innovative procedure based on probability theory was defined by Marcello Minenna by directly analyzing the time periods of the involved transactions in the insider trading.

=== Proof of responsibility ===
Proving that someone has been responsible for a trade can be difficult because traders may try to hide behind nominees, offshore companies, and other proxies. The SEC prosecutes over 50 cases each year, with many being settled administratively out of court. The SEC and several stock exchanges actively monitor trading, looking for suspicious activity. The SEC does not have criminal enforcement authority but can refer serious matters to the U.S. Attorney's Office for further investigation and prosecution.

=== Trading on information in general ===
In the United States and most non-European jurisdictions, not all trading on non-public information is illegal insider trading. For example, a person in a restaurant who hears the CEO of Company A at the next table tell the CFO that the company's profits will be higher than expected and then buys the stock is not guilty of insider trading—unless he or she had some closer connection to the company or company officers. However, even where the tippee is not himself an insider, where the tippee knows that the information is non-public and the information is paid for, or the tipper receives a benefit for giving it, then in the broader-scope jurisdictions the subsequent trading is illegal.

Notwithstanding, information about a tender offer (usually regarding a merger or acquisition) is held to a higher standard. If this type of information is obtained (directly or indirectly) and there is reason to believe it is nonpublic, there is a duty to disclose it or abstain from trading.

In the United States in addition to civil penalties, the trader may also be subject to criminal prosecution for fraud or where SEC regulations have been broken, the U.S. Department of Justice (DOJ) may be called to conduct an independent parallel investigation. If the DOJ finds criminal wrongdoing, the department may file criminal charges.

=== Commercialisation ===
The advent of the Internet has provided a forum for the commercialisation of trading on insider information. In 2016 a number of dark web sites were identified as marketplaces where such non-public information was bought and sold. At least one such site used bitcoin to avoid currency restrictions and to impede tracking. Such sites also provide a place for soliciting for corporate informants, where non-public information may be used for purposes other than stock trading.

=== Legislative trading ===
Politicians are not insiders in the traditional sense, because they do not have access to company-internal information. However, legislators know substantially more than retail investors about imminent or possible corporate regulation. Empirically, U.S. Congresspersons trade more when the legislature is in session and in periods with higher geopolitical risk.

== Legality ==
Legal trades by insiders are common, as employees of publicly traded corporations often have stock or stock options. These trades are made public in the United States through SEC filings that are also being made available by academic researchers as structured datasets.

In 2000, U.S. SEC Rule 10b5-1 clarified that the prohibition against insider trading does not require proof that an insider actually used material nonpublic information when conducting a trade; possession of such information alone is sufficient to violate the provision, and the SEC would infer that an insider in possession of material nonpublic information used this information when conducting a trade.

However, SEC Rule 10b5-1 also created for insiders an affirmative defense if the insider can demonstrate that the trades conducted on behalf of the insider were conducted as part of a pre-existing contract or written binding plan for trading in the future. For example, if an insider expects to retire after a specific period of time and, as part of retirement planning, the insider has adopted a written binding plan to sell a specific amount of the company's stock every month for two years, and the insider later comes into possession of material nonpublic information about the company, trades based on the original plan might not constitute prohibited insider trading. In 2022 the SEC amended Rule 10b5-1 to require cooling-off periods before persons other than issuers can begin trading under a plan. The amendments also required issuers to disclose more about their insider trading policies and about the use of such plans by their directors and officers.

In addition to regulatory enforcement, private enforcement through shareholder derivative lawsuits acts as a legal deterrent, with empirical evidence showing that legal restrictions on derivative suits lead to an increase in opportunistic insider trading.

=== Arguments for further prohibition ===
Trading on non-public legislative information is considered a conflict of interest, contributing to social distrust; and has motivated legislation restricting politicians to engage in trading, such as the STOCK Act. A 2025 study demonstrated that insider trading by members of Congress reduces political legitimacy and public willingness to comply with the law.

There are very limited laws against "shadow trading", where insiders trade on information which affect the commodities markets (corn, wheat, steel, etc.) or which indirectly impacts other companies. Due to similar consequences to traditional insider trading some studies recommend a prohibition on shadow trading as well.

=== Arguments for legalizing ===
Some argue that insider trading is a victimless act: a willing buyer and a willing seller agree to trade property that the seller rightfully owns, with no prior contract (according to this view) having been made between the parties to refrain from trading if there is asymmetric information. Writing for The Atlantic in 2011, journalist Megan McArdle has described the process as "arguably the closest thing that modern finance has to a victimless crime". In 2002, Milton Friedman, laureate of the Nobel Memorial Prize in Economics, said: "You want more insider trading, not less. You want to give the people most likely to have knowledge about deficiencies of the company an incentive to make the public aware of that." Friedman did not believe that the trader should be required to make his trade known to the public, because in his view the buying or selling pressure itself is information for the market.

Advocates of legalization have also cited free speech, arguing that punishment for communicating about a development pertinent to the next day's stock price could be seen as an act of censorship.

Some authors have used these arguments to propose legalizing insider trading on negative information (but not on positive information). Since negative information is often withheld from the market, trading on such information theoretically has a higher value for the market than trading on positive information.

== Legal differences among jurisdictions ==
The U.S. and the UK differ in the way the law is interpreted and applied with regard to insider trading. In the UK, the relevant laws are the Criminal Justice Act 1993, Part V, Schedule 1; the Financial Services and Markets Act 2000, which defines an offence of "market abuse"; and the European Union Regulation No 596/2014. The principle is that it is illegal to trade on the basis of market-sensitive information that is not generally known. This is a much broader scope than under U.S. law. The key differences from U.S. law are that no relationship to either the issuer of the security or the tipster is required; all that is required is that the guilty party traded (or caused trading) whilst having inside information, and there is no scienter requirement under UK law.

Japan enacted its first law against insider trading in 1988. Roderick Seeman said, "Even today many Japanese do not understand why this is illegal. Indeed, previously it was regarded as common sense to make a profit from your knowledge."

In Malta the law follows the European broader scope model. The relevant statute is the Prevention of Financial Markets Abuse Act of 2005, as amended. Earlier acts included the Financial Markets Abuse Act in 2002, and the Insider Dealing and Market Abuse Act of 1994.

The International Organization of Securities Commissions (IOSCO) paper on the "Objectives and Principles of Securities Regulation" (updated to 2003) states that the three objectives of good securities market regulation are investor protection, ensuring that markets are fair, efficient and transparent, and reducing systemic risk.

The discussion of these "Core Principles" state that "investor protection" in this context means "Investors should be protected from misleading, manipulative or fraudulent practices, including insider trading, front running or trading ahead of customers and the misuse of client assets." More than 85 percent of the world's securities and commodities market regulators are members of IOSCO and have signed on to these Core Principles.

The World Bank and International Monetary Fund now use the IOSCO Core Principles in reviewing the financial health of different country's regulatory systems as part of these organization's financial sector assessment program, so laws against insider trading based on non-public information are now expected by the international community. Enforcement of insider trading laws varies widely from country to country, but the vast majority of jurisdictions now outlaw the practice, at least in principle.

Larry Harris claims that differences in the effectiveness with which countries restrict insider trading help to explain the differences in executive compensation among those countries. The US, for example, has much higher CEO salaries than have Japan or Germany, where insider trading is less effectively restrained.

== By nation ==
=== Australia ===
The current Australian legislation arose out of the report of a 1989 parliamentary committee report which recommended removal of the requirement that the trader be 'connected' with the body corporate. This may have weakened the importance of the fiduciary duty rationale and possibly brought new potential offenders within its ambit. In Australia if a person possesses inside information and knows, or ought reasonably to know, that the information is not generally available and is materially price sensitive then the insider must not trade. She or he also must not procure another to trade and must not tip another. Information will be considered generally available if it consists of readily observable matter or it has been made known to common investors and a reasonable period for it to be disseminated among such investors has elapsed.

=== Brazil ===
The practice of insider trading is an illegal act under Brazilian law, since it constitutes unfair behavior that threatens the security and equality of legal conditions in the market. Since 2001, the practice is also considered a crime. L, as amended by Law 10,303/2001, provided for Article 27-D, which typifies the conduct of "Using relevant information not yet disclosed to the market, of which he is aware and from which he must maintain secrecy, capable of providing, for himself or for others, undue advantage, through trading, on his own behalf or on behalf of a third party, with securities: Penalty — imprisonment, from 1 (one) to 5 (five) years, and a fine of up to 3 (three) times the amount of the illicit advantage obtained as a result of the crime."

The first conviction handed down in Brazil for the practice of the offense of "misuse of privileged information" occurred in 2011, by federal judge Marcelo Costenaro Cavali, of the Sixth Criminal Court of São Paulo. It is the case of the Sadia–Perdigão merger. The former Director of Finance and Investor Relations, Luiz Gonzaga Murat Júnior, was sentenced to one year and nine months in prison in an open regime, replaceable by community service, and the inability to exercise the position of administrator or fiscal councilor of a publicly traded company for the time he serves his sentence, in addition to a fine of R$349,711.53. The then member of the board of directors Romano Ancelmo Fontana Filho was sentenced to prison for one year and five months in an open regime, also replaceable by community service, in addition to not being able to exercise the position of administrator or fiscal councilor of a publicly held company. He was also fined R$374,940.52.

=== Canada ===
In 2008, police uncovered an insider trading conspiracy involving Bay Street and Wall Street lawyer Gil Cornblum who had worked at Sullivan & Cromwell and was working at Dorsey & Whitney, and a former lawyer, Stan Grmovsek, who were found to have gained over $10 million in illegal profits over a 14-year span. Cornblum committed suicide by jumping from a bridge as he was under investigation and shortly before he was to be arrested but before criminal charges were laid against him, one day before his alleged co-conspirator Grmovsek pleaded guilty. Grmovsek pleaded guilty to insider trading and was sentenced to 39 months in prison. This was the longest term ever imposed for insider trading in Canada. These crimes were explored in Mark Coakley's 2011 non-fiction book, Tip and Trade.

=== China ===
The majority of shares in China before 2005 were non-tradeable shares that were not sold on the stock exchange publicly but privately. To make shares more accessible, the China Securities Regulation Commission (CSRC) required the companies to convert the non-tradeable shares into tradeable shares. There was a deadline for companies to convert their shares and the deadline was short, and due to this there was a large amount of exchanges, and many of these were conducted based on critical inside information. At the time, insider trading did not lead to prison time. Generally, punishment may include monetary fees or temporary relieving from a position in the company, but prison time is rare. However, in 2015, the Chinese fund manager Xu Xiang was arrested for insider trading, and in 2017, he was sentenced to five and a half years in prison and fined 11 billion yuan.

=== European Union ===
In 2014, the European Union (EU) adopted legislation (Criminal Sanctions for Market Abuse Directive) that harmonised criminal sanctions for insider dealing. All EU Member States agreed to introduce maximum prison sentences of at least four years for serious cases of market manipulation and insider dealing, and at least two years for improper disclosure of insider information.

=== India ===
Insider trading in India is an offense according to Sections 12A and 15G of the Securities and Exchange Board of India Act, 1992, and the Securities and Exchange Board of India (Prohibition of Insider Trading) Regulations, 2015. Insider trading is when one with access to non-public, price-sensitive information about the securities of the company subscribes, buys, sells, or deals, or agrees to do so or counsels another to do so as principal or agent. Price-sensitive information is information that materially affects the value of the securities. The penalty for insider trading is imprisonment, which may extend to five years, and a minimum of five lakh rupees (500,000) to 25 crore rupees (250 million) or three times the profit made, whichever is higher.

The Wall Street Journal, in a 2014 article entitled "Why It's Hard to Catch India's Insider Trading", said that despite a widespread belief that insider trading takes place on a regular basis in India, there were few examples of insider traders being prosecuted in India. One former top regulator said that in India insider trading is deeply rooted and especially rampant because regulators do not have the tools to address it. In the few cases where prosecution has taken place, cases have sometimes taken more than a decade to reach trial, and punishments have been light; and despite SEBI by law having the ability to demand penalties of up to $4 million, the few fines that were levied for insider trading have usually been under $200,000.

=== Kuwait ===
The U.S. SEC alleged that in 2009 Kuwaiti trader Hazem Al-Braikan engaged in insider trading after misleading the public about possible takeover bids for two companies. Three days after Al-Braikan was sued by the SEC, he was found dead of a gunshot wound to the head in his home in Kuwait City on July 26, 2009, in what Kuwaiti police called a suicide. The SEC later reached a $6.5 million settlement of civil insider trading charges, with his estate and others.

=== Norway ===
In 2009, a journalist in Nettavisen (Thomas Gulbrandsen) was sentenced to four months in prison for insider trading.

The longest prison sentence in a Norwegian trial where the main charge was insider trading was for eight years (two suspended) when Alain Angelil was convicted in a district court on December 9, 2011.

=== Philippines ===
Under Republic Act 8799 or the Securities Regulation Code, insider trading in the Philippines is illegal.

=== United Kingdom ===
Although insider trading in the UK has been illegal since 1980, it proved difficult to successfully prosecute individuals accused of insider trading. There were a number of notorious cases where individuals were able to escape prosecution. Instead the UK regulators relied on a series of fines to punish market abuses.

These fines were widely perceived as an ineffective deterrent, and there was a statement of intent by the UK regulator (the Financial Services Authority) to use its powers to enforce the legislation (specifically the Financial Services and Markets Act 2000). Between 2009 and 2012 the FSA secured 14 convictions in relation to insider dealing.

=== United States ===
==== United States law ====
Until the 21st century and the European Union's market abuse laws, the United States was the leading country to prohibit insider trading on the basis of material non-public information. Thomas Newkirk and Melissa Robertson of the SEC summarize the development of U.S. insider trading laws. Insider trading has a base offense level of 8, which puts it in Zone A under the U.S. Sentencing Guidelines. This means that first-time offenders are eligible to receive probation rather than incarceration.

==== Statutory ====
U.S. insider trading prohibitions are based on English and American common law prohibitions against fraud. In 1909, well before the Securities Exchange Act was passed, the United States Supreme Court ruled that a corporate director who bought that company's stock when he knew the stock's price was about to increase committed fraud by buying but not disclosing his inside information.

Section 15 of the Securities Act of 1933 contained prohibitions of fraud in the sale of securities, which were greatly strengthened by the Securities Exchange Act of 1934.

Section 16(b) of the Securities Exchange Act of 1934 prohibits short-swing profits (from any purchases and sales within any six-month period) made by corporate directors, officers, or stockholders owning more than 10% of a firm's shares. Under Section 10(b) of the 1934 Act, SEC Rule 10b-5, prohibits fraud related to securities trading.

The Insider Trading Sanctions Act of 1984 and the Insider Trading and Securities Fraud Enforcement Act of 1988 place penalties for illegal insider trading as high as three times the amount of profit gained or loss avoided through illegal trading.

==== SEC regulations ====
SEC regulation FD ("Fair Disclosure") requires that if a company intentionally discloses material, non-public information to one person, it must simultaneously disclose that information to the public at large. In the case of unintentional disclosure of material, non-public information to one person, the company must make a public disclosure "promptly".

Insider trading and similar practices are also regulated by the SEC under its rules on takeovers and tender offers under the Williams Act.

==== U.S. court decisions ====
Much of the development of insider trading law has occurred through or resulted from court decisions.

In 1909, the Supreme Court of the United States ruled in Strong v. Repide that a director who expects to act in a way that affects the value of shares cannot use knowledge of that expectation to acquire shares from those who do not know of the expected action. Even though in general, ordinary relations between directors and shareholders in a business corporation are not of such a fiduciary nature as to make it the duty of a director to disclose to a shareholder general knowledge regarding the value of the shares of the company before he purchases any from a shareholder, some cases involve special facts that impose such duty.

In 1968, the Second Circuit Court of Appeals advanced a "level playing field" theory of insider trading in SEC v. Texas Gulf Sulphur Co. The court stated that anyone in possession of inside information must either disclose the information or refrain from trading. Officers of the Texas Gulf Sulphur Company had used inside information about the discovery of the Kidd Mine to make profits by buying shares and call options on company stock.

In 1984, the Supreme Court ruled in Dirks v. Securities and Exchange Commission that tippees (recipients of second-hand information) are liable for insider trading if they had reason to believe that the tipper had breached a fiduciary duty in disclosing confidential information. One such example would be if the tipper received any personal benefit from the disclosure, thereby breaching his or her duty of loyalty to the company. In Dirks, the "tippee" had received confidential information from an insider, a former employee of a company. The reason the insider had disclosed the information to the tippee, and the reason the tippee had disclosed the information to third parties, was to blow the whistle on fraud at the company. As a result of the tippee's efforts the fraud was uncovered and the company went into bankruptcy. But, while the tippee had given the "inside" information to clients who made profits from the information, the Supreme Court ruled that the tippee could not be held liable under the federal securities laws because the insider from whom he received the information had not released the information for an improper purpose (a personal benefit) but rather for the purpose of exposing the fraud. The court ruled that the tippee could not have been aiding and abetting a securities law violation committed by the insider because no securities law violation had been committed by the insider.

In 2019, the United States Court of Appeals for the Second Circuit ruled in United States v. Blaszczak that the "personal-benefit" test announced in Dirks does not apply to Title 18 fraud statutes, such as 18 USC 1348. In Dirks, the court also defined the concept of "constructive insiders" as lawyers, investment bankers, and others who receive confidential information from a corporation while providing services to the corporation. The court held that constructive insiders are also liable for insider trading violations if the corporation expects the information revealed to them to remain confidential, since they acquire the fiduciary duties of a true insider.

The next expansion of insider trading liability came in SEC vs. Materia, 745 F.2d 197 (2d Cir. 1984), the case that first introduced the misappropriation theory of liability for insider trading. Materia, a financial printing firm proofreader who clearly was not an insider by any definition, was found to have determined the identity of takeover targets based on proofreading tender offer documents in the course of his employment. After a two-week trial, the district court found him liable for insider trading, and the Second Circuit Court of Appeals affirmed, holding that the theft of information from an employer, and the use of that information to purchase or sell securities in another entity, constituted a fraud in connection with the purchase or sale of a securities. The misappropriation theory of insider trading was born, and liability was thereby further expanded to encompass a larger group of outsiders.

In United States v. Carpenter (1986), the Supreme Court cited an earlier ruling while unanimously upholding mail and wire fraud convictions for a defendant who had received his information from a journalist rather than from the company itself. The journalist R. Foster Winans was also convicted, on the grounds that he had misappropriated information belonging to his employer, The Wall Street Journal. In the widely publicized case, Winans had traded in advance of "Heard on the Street" columns appearing in the Journal.

The Court stated in Carpenter: "It is well established, as a general proposition, that a person who acquires special knowledge or information by virtue of a confidential or fiduciary relationship with another is not free to exploit that knowledge or information for his own personal benefit but must account to his principal for any profits derived therefrom." However, in upholding the securities fraud (insider trading) convictions the justices were evenly split.

In 1997, the U.S. Supreme Court adopted the misappropriation theory of insider trading in United States v. O'Hagan, 521 U.S. 642, 655 (1997). O'Hagan was a partner in a law firm representing Grand Metropolitan while it was considering a tender offer for Pillsbury Company. O'Hagan used this inside information by buying call options on Pillsbury stock, thereby realizing profits of over $4.3 million. O'Hagan argued that neither he nor his firm had owed a fiduciary duty to Pillsbury, so he had not committed fraud by purchasing Pillsbury options. The Court rejected O'Hagan's arguments and upheld his conviction.

The "misappropriation theory" holds that a person commits fraud "in connection with" a securities transaction, and thereby violates 10(b) and Rule 10b-5, when he misappropriates confidential information for securities trading purposes in breach of a duty owed to the source of the information. Under this theory, a fiduciary's undisclosed, self-serving use of a principal's information to purchase or sell securities, in breach of a duty of loyalty and confidentiality, defrauds the principal of the exclusive use of the information. In lieu of premising liability on a fiduciary relationship between a company insider and the purchaser or seller of the company's stock, the misappropriation theory premises liability on a fiduciary-turned-trader's deception of those who entrusted him with access to confidential information.

The Court specifically recognized that a corporation's information is its property: "A company's confidential information ... qualifies as property to which the company has a right of exclusive use. The undisclosed misappropriation of such information in violation of a fiduciary duty ... constitutes fraud akin to embezzlement – the fraudulent appropriation to one's own use of the money or goods entrusted to one's care by another."

In 2000, the SEC enacted SEC Rule 10b5-1, which defined trading "on the basis of" inside information as trades that occur while the trader is aware of material nonpublic information. It is no longer a defense for one to say that one would have made the trade anyway. However, the rule also codified an affirmative defense for pre-planned trades.

In Morgan Stanley v. Skowron, 989 F. Supp. 2d 356 (S.D.N.Y. 2013), applying New York's faithless servant doctrine, the court held that a hedge fund's portfolio manager who had engaged in insider trading in violation of his company's code of conduct, which also required him to report that misconduct, was required to repay his employer the full $31 million his employer had paid him as compensation during his period of faithlessness. The court called the insider trading the "ultimate abuse of a portfolio manager's position". The judge also wrote: "In addition to exposing Morgan Stanley to government investigations and direct financial losses, Skowron's behavior damaged the firm's reputation, a valuable corporate asset."

In 2014, in United States v. Newman, the United States Court of Appeals for the Second Circuit cited the Supreme Court's decision in Dirks and ruled that for a "tippee" (a person who used information they received from an insider) to be guilty of insider trading, the tippee must have been aware not only that the information was insider information, but must also that the insider had released the information for an improper purpose (such as a personal benefit). The Court concluded that an insider's breach of a fiduciary duty not to release confidential information, in the absence of an improper purpose on the part of the insider, is not enough to impose criminal liability on either the insider or the tippee.

In 2016, in Salman v. United States, the U.S. Supreme Court held that the benefit a tipper must receive as the predicate for an insider-trader prosecution of a tippee need not be pecuniary, and that giving a 'gift' of a tip to a family member is presumptively an act for the personal, albeit intangible, benefit of the tipper.

==== By members of Congress ====
Members of the U.S. Congress are not exempt from the laws that ban insider trading. Because they generally do not have a confidential relationship with the source of the information they receive, however, they do not meet the usual definition of an "insider". House of Representatives rules may, however, provide that congressional insider trading is unethical. A 2004 study found that stock sales and purchases by senators outperformed the market by 12.3% per year. Peter Schweizer points out several examples of insider trading by members of Congress, including action taken by Spencer Bachus following a private, behind-the-doors meeting on the evening of September 18, 2008 wherein Hank Paulson and Ben Bernanke informed members of Congress about the issues due to the 2008 financial crisis; Bachus shorted stocks the next morning and cashed in his profits within a week. Also attending the same meeting were Senator Dick Durbin and House Speaker John Boehner; the same day (effective the following day), Durbin sold mutual-fund shares worth $42,696 and reinvested it all with Warren Buffett. Also the same day (effective the following day), Boehner cashed out of an equity mutual fund.

In May 2007, a bill entitled the Stop Trading on Congressional Knowledge Act, or STOCK Act was introduced to hold congressional and federal employees liable for stock trades they made using information they gained through their jobs and also regulate analysts or political intelligence firms that research government activities. The STOCK Act was enacted on April 4, 2012. In the approximately nine month period ending September 2021, Senate and House members disclosed 4,000 trades of stocks and bonds, worth at least $315 million.

===== 2020 congressional insider trading scandal =====
In 2020, a political scandal erupted involving allegations that several members of the United States Senate violated the STOCK Act by selling stock at the start of the COVID-19 pandemic in the United States and just before a stock market crash on February 20, 2020, using knowledge given to them at a closed Senate meeting. The Department of Justice (DOJ) initiated a probe into the stock transactions on March 30, 2020. No charges were brought against anyone and all investigations into the matter are closed.

==== Incidents ====
Anil Kumar, a senior partner at management consulting firm McKinsey & Company, pleaded guilty to conspiracy and securities fraud in 2010.

Chip Skowron, a hedge fund co-portfolio manager of FrontPoint Partners LLC's health care funds, was convicted of insider trading in 2011, for which he served five years in prison. He had been tipped off by a consultant to a company that the company was about to make a negative announcement regarding its clinical trial for a drug. Skowron initially denied the charges against him and his defense attorney said he would plead not guilty, saying "We look forward to responding to the allegations more fully in court at the appropriate time". However, after the consultant charged with tipping him off pleaded guilty, he changed his position, and admitted his guilt.

Rajat Gupta, who had been managing partner of McKinsey & Co. and a director at Goldman Sachs Group Inc. and Procter & Gamble Co., was convicted by a federal jury in 2012 and sentence to two years in prison for leaking inside information to hedge fund manager Raj Rajaratnam who was sentenced to 11 years in prison. The case was prosecuted by the office of United States Attorney for the Southern District of New York Preet Bharara.

Mathew Martoma, former hedge fund trader and portfolio manager at S.A.C. Capital Advisors, was accused of generating possibly the largest single insider trading transaction profit in history at a value of $276 million. He was convicted in February 2014, and is serving a nine-year prison sentence.

With the guilty plea by Perkins Hixon in 2014 for insider trading from 2010 to 2013 while at Evercore Partners, Bharara said in a press release that 250 defendants whom his office had charged since August 2009 had now been convicted.

On December 10, 2014, a federal appeals court overturned the insider trading convictions of two former hedge fund traders, Todd Newman and Anthony Chiasson, based on "erroneous" instructions given to jurors by the trial judge. The decision was expected to affect the appeal of the separate insider-trading conviction of former SAC Capital portfolio manager Michael Steinberg and the U.S. Attorney and the SEC in 2015 did drop their cases against Steinberg and others.

In 2016, Sean Stewart, a former managing director at Perella Weinberg Partners LP and vice president at JPMorgan Chase, was convicted on allegations he tipped his father on pending health-care deals. The father, Robert Stewart, previously had pleaded guilty but did not testify during his son's trial. It was argued that by way of compensation for the tip, the father had paid more than $10,000 for Sean's wedding photographer.

In 2017, Billy Walters, a Las Vegas sports bettor, was convicted of making $40 million on private information about Dallas-based dairy processing company Dean Foods, and sentenced to five years in prison. Walters's source, company director Thomas C. Davis, employing a prepaid cell phone and sometimes the code words "Dallas Cowboys" for Dean Foods, helping Walters to realize profits and avoid losses in the stock from 2008 to 2014, the federal jury found. Golfer Phil Mickelson "was also mentioned during the trial as someone who had traded in Dean Foods shares and once owed nearly $2 million in gambling debts to" Walters. Mickelson "made roughly $1 million trading Dean Foods shares; he agreed to forfeit those profits in a related civil case brought by the Securities and Exchange Commission". Walters appealed the verdict, but in December 2018 his conviction was upheld by the 2nd Circuit Court of Appeals.

In 2018, David Blaszczak, the "king of political intelligence"; Theodore Huber and Robert Olan, two partners at hedge fund Deerfield Management; and Christopher Worrall, an employee at the Centers for Medicare and Medicaid Services (CMS), were convicted for insider trading by the U.S. Attorney's Office in the Southern District of New York. Worrall leaked confidential government information that he stole from CMS to Blaszczak, and Blaszczak passed that information to Huber and Olan, who made $7 million trading securities. The convictions were upheld in 2019 by the Second Circuit Court of Appeals; that court's opinion was vacated by the Supreme Court in 2021 and the Second Circuit is now reconsidering its decision.

In 2023, Terren Peizer was charged with insider trading by the SEC, which alleged that he sold $20 million of Ontrak Inc. stock while he was in possession of material nonpublic negative information. Peizer was the CEO and chairman of Ontrak. In addition, the U.S. Department of Justice announced criminal charges of securities fraud against Peizer, charging that thereby he had avoided $12 million in losses; he was arrested. The case was tried in the U.S. District Court for the Central District of California. He was convicted of all three charges in June 2024. In June 2025 he was sentenced to 42 months in prison, fined $5.25 million and ordered to forfeit more than $12.7 million. The Justice Department said it was the first insider trading prosecution resting solely on the use of Rule 10b5-1 trading plans.

Former Weil, Gotshal & Manges attorney Gabriel Gershowitz was indicted for insider trading, in January 2026, by the U.S. Attorney’s Office in Boston, as part of a scheme orchestrated over decades by a lawyer-led network of about 30, many of whom are former Yale Law School classmates and were indicted co-conspirators. That May, it was reported that Gershowitz had pleaded guilty, and that prosecutors in the case had described affected law firms as victimized by those charged, which include Wachtell, Lipton, Rosen & Katz, Goodwin Procter, Latham & Watkins, DLA Piper, Willkie Farr & Gallagher and Sidley Austin.

== See also ==
- Abuse of information – Improper usage or mistreatment
- Big boy letter – Information waiver in the sale process for some financial instruments
- Operation Perfect Hedge – Civil and criminal actions by the U.S. SEC and DOJ
- Private Securities Litigation Reform Act – U.S. federal statute also known as PSLRA
- Reebok insider trading case – Insider trading scheme from 2004 to 2005
- Securities regulation in the United States – Law and regulations that relate to Securities
- Suspicious activity report – Report by a financial institution
- Tip and Trade – Book by Mark Coakley: How Two Lawyers Made Millions From Insider Trading
