= Mark Coakley =

Canadian writer of nonfiction

- Writing career
- Genre: Nonfiction
- Website: markcoakleybooks.com

Mark Coakley is a Canadian writer of nonfiction. Coakley was a lawyer in Hamilton, Ontario from 1998 to 2008, before becoming a full-time author. His first published book, Tip and Trade: How Two Lawyers Made Millions from Insider Trading, appeared in 2011. He has published true-crime pieces in Canada's Sharp (magazine). Coakley's next book, Hidden Harvest: The Rise and Fall of North America's Biggest Cannabis Grow-Op, was published by ECW Press on May 1, 2014; it depicts the North American illegal drug economy and a giant indoor cannabis grow-op. In 2022, Coakley published four books with Fire Ant Press: Murder Bugs: A Love Story, Shroom Boom: Canada's Psychedelic Pioneers, The Saga of Halfdan the Black and Various.

== Published works ==
- Tip and Trade. Toronto, Ontario: ECW Press. 2011. ISBN 978-1-55022-986-8. Depicts an insider trading conspiracy involving Wall Street lawyer Gil Corblum and another lawyer, Stan Grmovsek, who were found to have gained over $10 million in illegal profits over a 14-year span. The crime was detected in 2008. Corblum committed suicide before criminal charges were laid. Grmovsek pleaded guilty and was sentenced to 39 months in prison. Reviews of Tip and Trade were mixed, with three positive and one negative.
- Hidden Harvest. Toronto, Ontario: ECW Press. 2014. Depicts an illegal drug conspiracy in Canada that was involved in the creation of a gigantic cannabis garden in Barrie, Ontario, concealed inside an abandoned Molson beer factory. The Toronto Star called Hidden Harvest "thoroughly researched, entertaining … real, sometimes humourous [sic] and very Canadian"; a review in Toronto's Now was sub-titled, "Buy The Book"; on June 16, 2014, Coakley was interviewed on CBC Radio's The Current about Hidden Harvest.
