= H. Rodgin Cohen =

American lawyer (born 1944)

Rodge Cohen
- Born: Henry Rodgin Cohen; 1944 (age 81–82); Charleston, West Virginia, U.S.
- Education: Harvard University (BA, JD)

Henry Rodgin "Rodge" Cohen (born 1944) is an American corporate lawyer whose practice focuses on commercial banking and financial institutions. He is currently the senior chairman of the law firm Sullivan & Cromwell.

== Early life and education ==
Henry Rodgin Cohen was born in 1944, in the Fort Hill section of Charleston, West Virginia, to Louis and Bertie (Rodgin) Cohen. His father ran drugstores and his mother was a high school teacher.

After studying in the local public schools through junior high, Cohen attended and graduated from Deerfield Academy in Massachusetts. He then graduated from Harvard College (1965), and Harvard Law School (1968).

== Career ==
After two years in the U.S. Army as a military lawyer at Fort Monmouth, New Jersey, Cohen joined Sullivan & Cromwell LLP in 1970. Cohen served as Sullivan & Cromwell's Chairman from 2000 through the end of 2009. The Wall Street Journal refers to Cohen as "arguably the country's leading banking lawyer". He has been called "the trauma surgeon of Wall Street".

In 2009, Cohen was rumored to be considered for the post of Deputy Secretary of the Treasury in the Obama administration.

During the 2008 financial crisis, Cohen defended the financial system and Wall Street: "I am far from convinced there was something inherently wrong with the system."

Cohen was played by Robert J. Hogan in the 2011 film Too Big to Fail.
