= American Swiss Foundation =

The American Swiss Foundation is a private non-profit nonpartisan organization headquartered in New York. It was founded in 1945 "to preserve and strengthen the historic friendship between the United States and Switzerland".

== Young Leaders Conference ==
The main program of the American Swiss Foundation is a Young Leaders Conference, held annually in Switzerland since 1990. Conference alumni now number more than 1,300 leaders in both countries from business, government, the media, and academia. Among notable alumni are Foundation Chairman Robert J. Giuffra, Jr., U.S. Senator John Barrasso, and former North Carolina governor Pat McCrory.
