= Hidden Harvest =

2014 book by Mark Coakley

- Author: Mark Coakley
- Language: English
- Genre: True crime
- Publisher: ECW Press
- Publication date: April 2014
- Publication place: Canada
- Pages: 246 pp.
- ISBN: 978-1-77041-085-5

Hidden Harvest is a 2014 book by Canadian author Mark Coakley that depicts an illegal drug conspiracy in Canada that was involved in the creation of a gigantic cannabis garden in Barrie, Ontario, concealed inside an abandoned Molson beer factory. The Toronto Star called Hidden Harvest "thoroughly researched, entertaining … real, sometimes humorous and very Canadian"; a review in Toronto's Now was sub-titled, "Buy the Book". On June 16, 2014, Coakley was interviewed on CBC Radio's The Current about Hidden Harvest.

== See also ==
- List of books about cannabis
