= Dorsey & Whitney =

American law firm

Dorsey & Whitney LLP
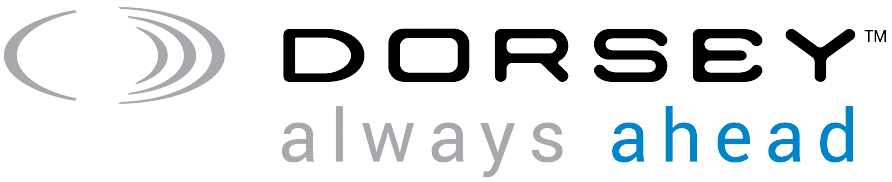
- Headquarters: 50 South Sixth; Minneapolis, MN
- No. of offices: 22
- No. of attorneys: 700
- Major practice areas: General Practice
- Revenue: $467.4 million USD (2023)
- Date founded: 1912
- Founder: William Lancaster, David Simpson
- Company type: Limited liability partnership
- Website: dorsey.com

Dorsey & Whitney LLP (known as Dorsey) is an international law firm based in the United States with approximately 700 attorneys and 22 offices across the United States, Canada, Europe, and Asia as of 2026. The firm's headquarters is in Minneapolis, Minnesota, where it was founded. As of 2025, Dorsey is led by managing partner Peter Nelson. The firm's lawyers have included several prominent public figures, including former U.S. Vice President Walter Mondale and U.S. Senator Amy Klobuchar.

== History ==
Dorsey was founded in 1912 by William Lancaster, a director of First National Bank of Minneapolis (now part of U.S. Bank), and David F. Simpson, a justice of the Minnesota Supreme Court. The following year, they hired James Dorsey as their first associate. Dorsey left the firm in the 1920s to become an investment banker, but returned to the firm a few years after the 1929 stock market crash. Dorsey led the firm until his death in 1959. The name of the firm continued to change for most of its history, until it was shortened into its current, permanent name in 1981.

The firm has also endowed the Dorsey and Whitney Professor of Law at the University of Minnesota Law School.

== Worldwide locations ==
Dorsey has offices in Anchorage, Beijing, Boise, Chicago, Dallas, Denver, Des Moines, Hong Kong, London, Minneapolis, Missoula, New York, Palo Alto, Phoenix, Salt Lake City, Seattle, Shanghai, Southern California (Costa Mesa), Toronto, Vancouver, Washington, DC, and Wilmington.

== Industries represented ==
Dorsey represents companies from a wide range of industries, including banking & financial institutions; development & infrastructure; energy & natural resources; food, beverage & agribusiness; healthcare & life sciences; and technology.

== Practice areas ==
Dorsey attorneys practice in over 60 areas of law, most prominently in the following areas:

- Trial
  - Commercial Litigation
  - Construction & Design
  - Healthcare Litigation
  - Intellectual Property Litigation
  - Securities & Financial Services Litigation
  - Government Solutions & Investigations
- Corporate
  - Capital Markets & Corporate Compliance
  - Mergers & Acquisitions
  - Technology Commerce
  - Emerging Companies
- Non-Trial Advocacy
  - Labor & Employment
  - Patent
  - Regulatory Affairs
  - Trademark, Copyright + Advertising
- Transactions
  - Benefits & Compensation
  - Finance & Restructuring
  - Healthcare Transactions & Regulations
  - Public Finance
  - Real Estate
  - Tax, Trust and Estates

== Pro bono commitment ==
Dorsey is committed to serving the communities in which they operate through pro bono work. The firm signed the American Bar Association's Law Firm Pro Bono Challenge charter in 1993. The charter signifies a pledge to provide pro bono legal assistance equal to at least 3% of the firm's billable hours. Dorsey has proudly exceeded the 3% challenge every year since 1993.

In 2025, Dorsey provided more than 25,000 hours of pro bono legal services to low-income individuals and nonprofit organizations.

== Notable alumni ==
- Harry Blackmun, former U.S. Supreme Court justice
- Amy Klobuchar, U.S. Senator
- Walter Mondale, former Vice President of the United States
- William Prosser, legal scholar
- Tom Vilsack, former Governor of Iowa

== Assistance to Guantanamo captives ==
Joshua Colangelo-Bryan, an attorney with Dorsey & Whitney prepared the habeas corpus petition for the six Bahraini citizens held in extrajudicial detention in the United States Guantanamo Bay detention camps, in Cuba. Juma al Dossari, one of Colangelo-Bryan's clients, made a suicide attempt during Colangelo-Bryan's visit.

Charles "Cully" Stimson, then Deputy Assistant Secretary of Defense for Detainee Affairs, stirred controversy when he went on record criticizing the patriotism of law firms that allowed employees to assist Guantanamo captives: "corporate CEOs seeing this should ask firms to choose between lucrative retainers and representing terrorists." Stimson's views were widely criticized. The Pentagon disavowed them and he resigned shortly thereafter.

== Insider trading controversy ==
In 2008, police uncovered an insider trading conspiracy involving Dorsey & Whitney partner Gil Cornblum, who there and earlier in his career at Sullivan & Cromwell in New York discovered inside information and, with his co-conspirator, Stanko "Stan" Grmovsek– a former lawyer and Cornblum's law school classmate –was found to have gained over $10 million in illegal profits over a 14-year span. Cornblum committed suicide by jumping from a bridge as he was under investigation and shortly before he was to be arrested but before criminal charges were laid against him, one day before his alleged co-conspirator pled guilty.

== See also ==
- Tip and Trade
- Insider trading
