= Frederic C. Rich =

- Education: Princeton University; King's College, Cambridge; University of Virginia
- Writing career
- Genres: Fiction, Non-fiction
- Subjects: politics, environment
- Website: www.fredericrich.com

Frederic C. Rich is an American author, lawyer, and environmentalist. He lives in New York City and New York State's Hudson Valley. Rich's first book, Christian Nation, is a work of dystopian political fiction arising from the counterfactual of a McCain/Palin victory in 2008 followed soon after by John McCain's sudden death and Sarah Palin's ascension to the presidency. It was published by W.W. Norton in 2013. In Getting to Green, a non-fiction book published by W. W. Norton in April 2016, Rich argues that the American environmental movement has lost its way and explains how it can get back on track. The book calls for conservatives to reconnect with their long tradition of support for conservation and for the Green movement to adopt the reforms necessary to restore bipartisan support for the environmental agenda.

== Early life and education ==
Rich grew up in New Jersey and attended Deerfield Academy and Princeton University. After graduating from Princeton, he studied moral philosophy at King's College, Cambridge as a Keasbey Scholar and then received his Juris Doctor degree at the University of Virginia School of Law.

== Career ==
=== Law ===
Rich practiced law at the international corporate law firm, Sullivan & Cromwell LLP, from 1981 through 2014, becoming a partner in 1989, leading the firm's project development and finance practice for 25 years, and serving as co-head of the firm's corporate, financial, and transactional practice from 1999 through 2005. In 2010 Chambers USA called Rich "the preeminent project finance lawyer in the world," and in 2011 he was named "Dealmaker of the Year" by American Lawyer.

=== Books and other writing ===
Rich has stated that his writing, both fiction and non-fiction, aims to probe contemporary political and moral issues from a perspective that is independent, non-partisan, and pragmatic. In addition to his books, Rich is a blogger on Huffington Post and other sites. His other writing includes book reviews and a proposal for a permanent site for the Olympic Games. He has also composed an environmental oratorio, The Hudson Oratorio.

== Environmental activism and interests ==
Rich has served on many not-for-profit boards, mostly of organizations working in the fields of environment, land conservation, and parks. He is Vice Chair of the Washington D.C.–based national Land Trust Alliance, Chair of the Scenic Hudson Land Trust, founding Chair of the Foundation for Landscape Studies, and Vice Chair of The Battery Conservancy in Manhattan. He serves as head of the Environmental Leaders Group in New York State, and he is on the Advisory Board of The Hastings Center (bioethics) and the Dean's Advisory Committee for the City University of New York School of Public Health.

In 2010 Rich developed an experimental rooftop food garden on the green roof of a LEED Platinum condominium building in Manhattan and began to chronicle its successes and failures in his blog, Battery Rooftop Garden, which has received attention from the media.

== Honors and awards ==
- 2010 The Frances Reese Medal from Scenic Hudson for "service to the Hudson Valley"
- 2011 American Lawyer "Dealmaker of the Year"
- 2011 Environmental Advocates of New York Advocates Award
- 2012 The Battery Conservancy Urban Farmer Award
- 2014 The Patricia Adams Award for Community Service from Desmond-Fish Library
