= Starr Foundation =

Charitable foundation established in 1955

- Founded: 1955
- Founder: Cornelius Vander Starr
- Purpose: Human needs, culture, public policy, medicine and healthcare, education and the environment.
- Location: New York, New York, United States
- Method: Grants
- Chairman: Jeffrey W. Greenberg
- President: Courtney O'Malley
- Endowment: $1.7 billion
- Website: www.starrfoundation.org

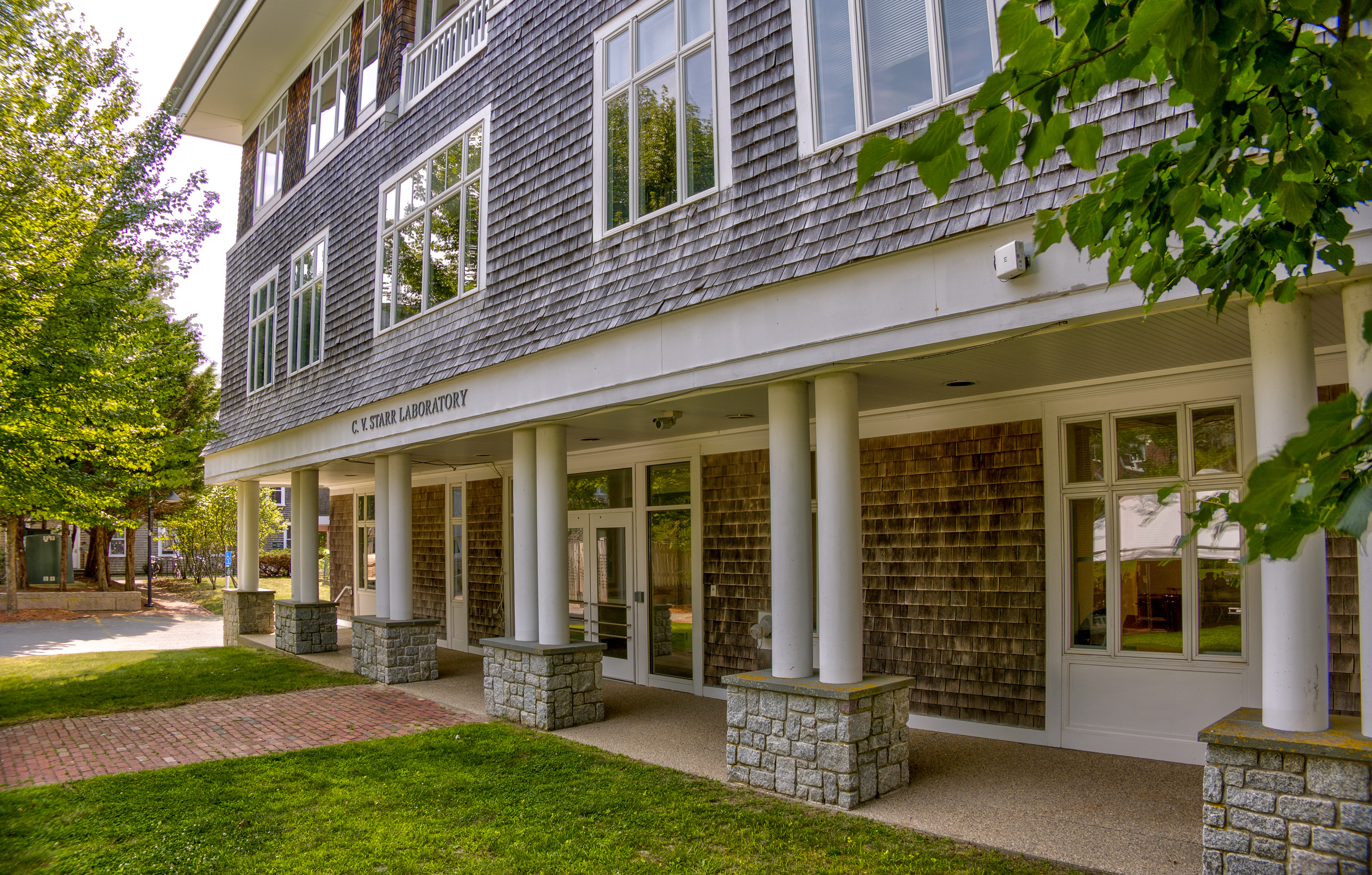
C.V. Starr Laboratory at the Marine Biological Laboratory in Woods Hole, Massachusetts

The Starr Foundation was established in 1955 by Cornelius Vander Starr, an insurance entrepreneur who founded C.V. Starr & Co. and other companies later combined by his successor, Maurice R. Greenberg, into what became the American International Group. Starr, a pioneer of globalization, set up his first insurance venture in Shanghai in 1919. Upon his death in 1968 his estate was passed on to the foundation. Today, it gives between US$100 million and $200 million each year to charities and causes globally.

The foundation, once one of the largest in the country with an endowment of some $6 billion in 2000, has disbursed over $3.8 billion since its founding. As of 2024, it had assets of $1.7 billion. It specializes in Asian arts and cultural philanthropy, but also makes grants in other areas, including education, medicine and healthcare, and public policy.

The foundation is no longer affiliated with AIG.

== Grants ==
The following is a partial list:

Grant Size	Use	Time Frame	Link
US$17 million	Community Center in Fort Bragg, California	2001 - 2008	https://web.archive.org/web/20090919054007/http://www.mendocoastrec.org/aquatic_center-newsnav.html
US$100 million	Create a multi-institutional cancer research consortium	September 2006	http://www.mskcc.org/mskcc/html/70702.cfm
US$50 million	Starr Fund for Collaborative Science	November 2006	http://newswire.rockefeller.edu/?id=544&page=engine
US$25 million	Expand Harlem Children's Zone Project	October 2006	https://web.archive.org/web/20081119145212/http://www.starrfoundation.org/pr_harlem.html
US$15 million	Scholarships at Brown University	March 2002	https://www.brown.edu/Administration/News_Bureau/2001-02/01-104.html
US$5 million	Increase the size and quality of the search inventory - New York Blood Center	February 2003
US$25 million	National September 11 Memorial & Museum New York City	2007	https://www.nytimes.com/2007/06/02/nyregion/02foundation.html?&pagewanted=print
US$1.5 million	Support additions to the Korean and Tibetan collections - Columbia University	October 2002	http://www.columbia.edu/cu/lweb/news/libraries/2002/2002-10-31.starr_grant.html

== See also ==
- List of wealthiest foundations
- Florence A. Davis, Foundation President
