= Mission Indradhanush =

Health mission of the government of India

- Country: India
- Prime Minister(s): Narendra Modi
- Ministry: Ministry of Health and Family Welfare
- Key people: J. P. Nadda; Dr. Harsh Vardhan
- Launched: 25 December 2014
- Status: Active
- Website: nhp.gov.in

Mission Indradhanush is a health mission of the Government of India. It was launched by Union Health Minister J. P. Nadda on 25 December 2014. The scheme this seeks to drive towards 90% full immunisation coverage of India and sustain the same by year 2022. Vaccination is being provided against eight vaccine-preventable diseases nationally, i.e. Diphtheria, Whooping Cough, Tetanus, Polio, Measles, severe form of Childhood Tuberculosis and Hepatitis B and meningitis & pneumonia caused by Haemophilus influenza type B; and against Rotavirus Diarrhea and Japanese Encephalitis in selected states and districts respectively.

201 districts will be covered in the first phase. Of these, 82 districts are in the states of Uttar Pradesh, Bihar, Rajasthan, and Madhya Pradesh. The 201 districts selected have nearly 50% of all unvaccinated children in the country. The mission follow planning and administration like PPI (Pulse Polio immunisation). Mission Indradhanush may be regarded as one of the key schemes of the NDA government in India.

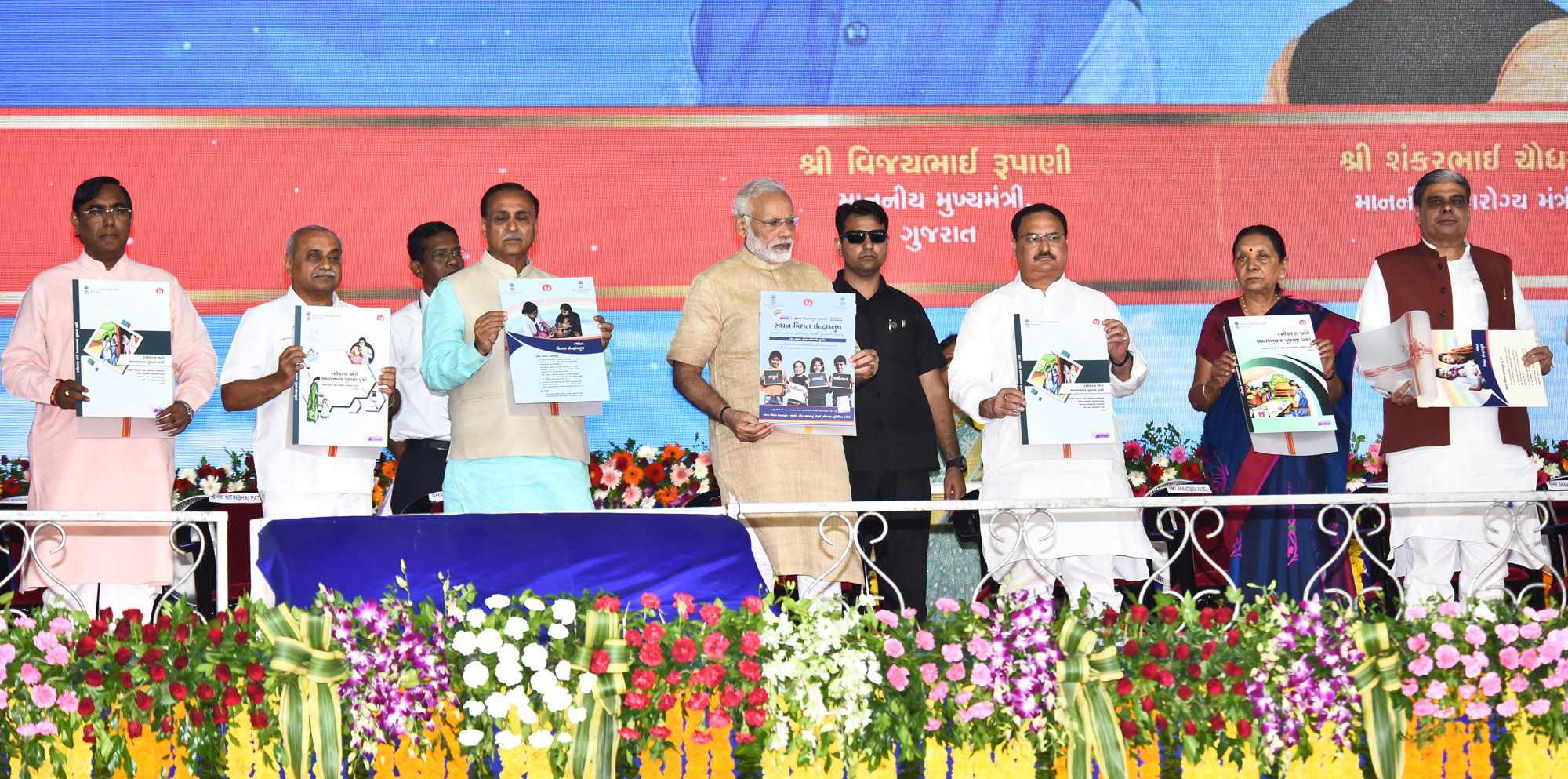
PM Narendra Modi launching the Mission Intensified Indradhanush, at Vadnagar

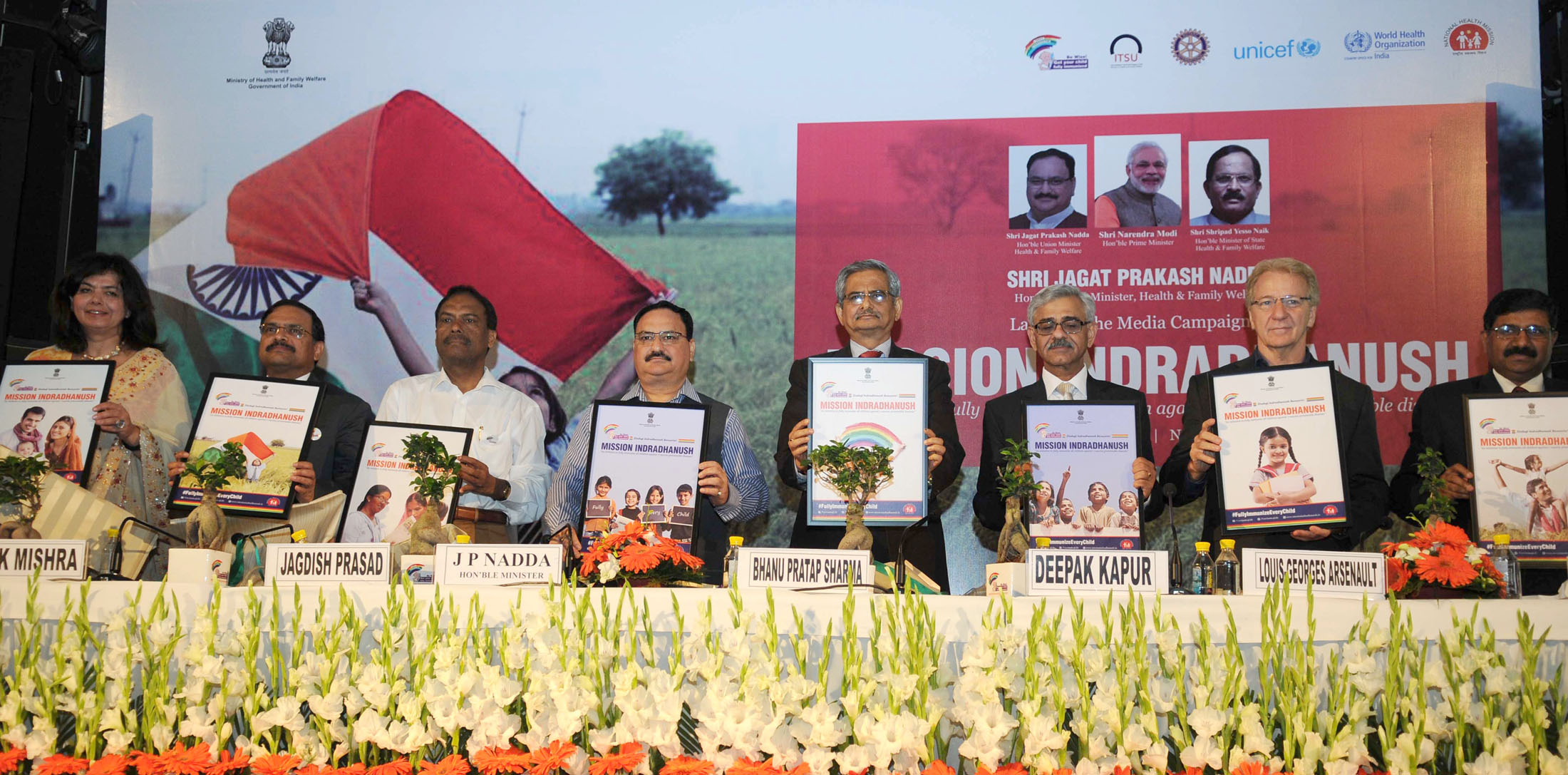
J. P. Nadda launching the Media Campaign of “Mission Indradhanush”, in New Delhi with The UNICEF Representative for India, Mr. Louis-Georges Arsenault, the Secretary

== History ==
Immunisation Programme in India was introduced in 1978 as ‘Expanded Programme of Immunisation’ (EPI) by the Ministry of Health and Family Welfare, Government of India. In 1985, the programme was modified as under National Health Mission (NHM) since 2005. Despite being operational for many years, UIP has been able to fully immunise only 65% children in the first year of their life.

== Goal of Mission Indradhanush ==
Launched on 25 December 2014, this seeks to drive towards 90% full immunisation coverage of India and sustain the same by year 2020. The ultimate goal of Mission Indradhanush is to ensure full immunisation with all available vaccines for children up to two years of age and pregnant women. The Government has identified 600 high focus districts across 28 states in the country that have the highest number of partially immunised and unimmunised children.

Earlier the increase in full immunisation coverage was 1% per year which has increased to 6.7% per year through the first two phases of Mission Indradhanush. Four phases of Mission Indradhanush have been conducted till August 2017 and more than 2.53 crore children and 68 lakh pregnant women have been vaccinated.

It aims to immunise all children under the age of 2 years, as well as all pregnant women, against seven vaccine preventable diseases(like 7 colors of a rainbow/indradhanush). The diseases being targeted are diphtheria, whooping cough, tetanus, poliomyelitis, tuberculosis, measles, meningitis and Hepatitis B. In addition to these, vaccines for Japanese encephalitis and Haemophilus influenzae type B are also being provided in selected states. In 2016, four new additions have been made namely Rubella, Japanese Encephalitis, Injectable Polio Vaccine Bivalent and Rotavirus. In 2017, Pneumonia was added to the Mission by incorporating Pneumococcal conjugate vaccine under Universal Immunisation Programme.

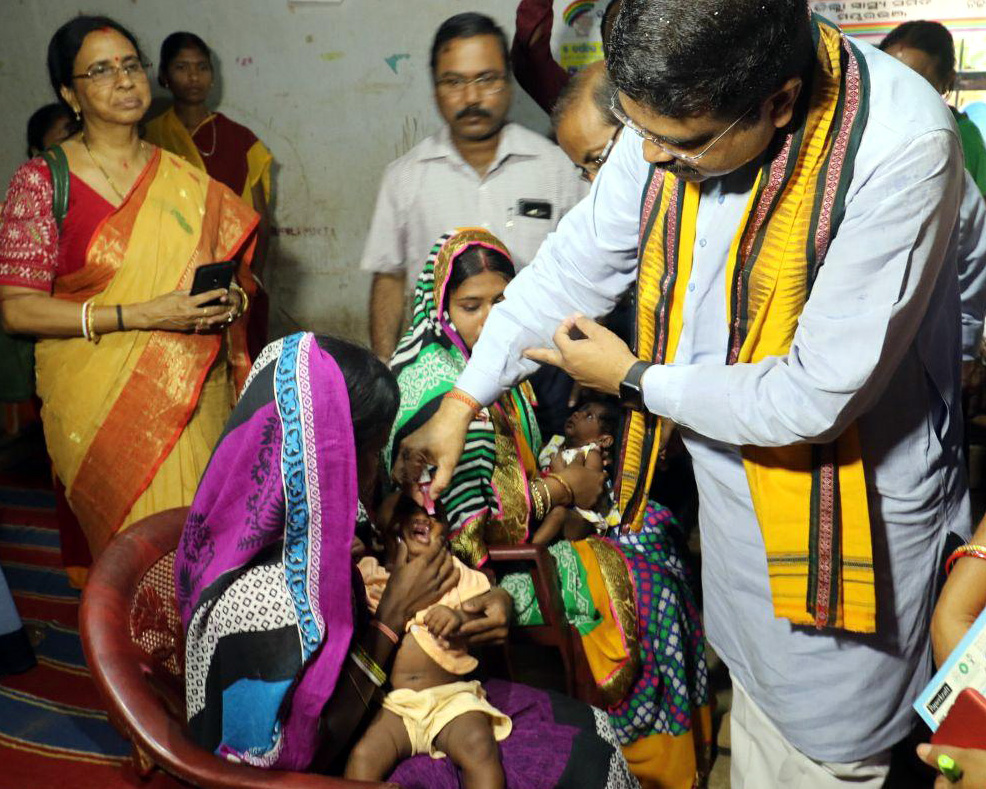
Vaccination programme under Mission Indradhanush, at a tribal village Haripur in Badsahi Block of Mayurbhanj witnessed by Dharmendra Pradhan

== Intensified Mission Indradhanush ==
To further intensify the immunisation programme, PM Narendra Modi launched the Intensified Mission Indradhanush (IMI) on 8 October 2017. Through this the Government aims to reach each and every child up to two years of age and all those pregnant women who have been left uncovered under the routine immunisation programme/UIP.

The focus of special drive was to improve immunisation coverage in select districts and cities to ensure full immunisation to more than 90% by December 2018 instead of 2020.

== Intensified Mission Indradhanush 2.0 ==
To boost the routine immunisation coverage in the country, the minister of Health and Family welfare Dr. Harsh Vardhan introduced Intensified Mission Indradhanush 2.0 to ensure reaching the unreached with all available vaccines and accelerate the coverage of children and pregnant women in the identified districts and blocks from December 2019-March 2020. This aims to achieve the Sustainable Development Goal of ending preventable child deaths by 2030.

It aims at immunising 272 districts in 27 States and at block level (652 blocks) in Uttar Pradesh and Bihar because of its hard to reach and tribal populations.

Ministry of Women and Child Development, Panchayati Raj, Ministry of Urban Development, Ministry of Youth Affairs and others have come together to ensure the benefits of vaccines reach the last mile.

== Status ==
In December 2014, Mission Indradhanush was launched for a targeted approach to immunisation in India, in a bid to change the tardy annual growth rate of 1 per cent. Between 2014 and 2018, India's annual immunisation growth rate has risen to 4 per cent, with an unprecedented 16 per cent rise in the number of fully immunised children.

Official data on India's immunisation coverage still stands at 62 per cent as per the National Family Health Survey 4 (2015–16). However, the Union Health Ministry's internal data, presented recently at the 4th Partners’ Forum meeting in New Delhi, stands at 83 per cent, with just 2 per cent unimmunised children.

Concurrent monitoring is a combination of provider reporting and supervisor surveys done within the system to estimate how a programme is working. The concurrent data for 2014 showed a full immunisation coverage of 67%, according to documents available with The Indian Express.

The 83 per cent coverage figure is till November 2018. However, the target that the ministry had set for itself was to touch 90 per cent by December 2018, when Prime Minister Narendra Modi launched an upgraded version of the mission during the run-up to the Gujarat Assembly elections. A scientific study published in 2021 showed that the first two phases of Mission Indradhanush increased full immunisation rates of children by 27% and on-time receipt of vaccines by 8%.
