= Dividend distribution tax =

Indian tax on company dividends

Dividend distribution tax was a tax previously imposed by the Indian Government on Indian companies according to the dividend paid to a company's investors. The dividend distribution tax has been abolished since 2020 according to the Union Budget of India.

The Finance Act, 2020 changed the method of dividend taxation. Now all dividend received on or after 1 April 2020 is taxable in the hands of the investor/shareholder. The DDT liability on companies and mutual funds stand withdrawn. Similarly, the tax of 10% on dividend receipts of resident individuals, HUF and firms in excess of Rs 1 million (Section 115BBDA) also stands withdrawn.

The Finance Act, 2020 also imposes a TDS on dividend distribution by companies and mutual funds on or after 1 April 2020. The normal rate of TDS is 10% on dividend income paid in excess of Rs 5,000 from a company or mutual fund. However, as a COVID-19 relief measure, the government reduced the TDS rate to 7.5% for distribution from 14 May 2020 until 31 March 2021.
