= Market abuse =

Any action which unreasonably disadvantages other investors in a financial market

In economics and finance, market abuse may arise in circumstances in which investors in a financial market have been unreasonably disadvantaged, directly or indirectly, by others who:

- have used information which is not publicly available (insider dealing)
- have distorted the price-setting mechanism of financial instruments
- have disseminated false or misleading information (market manipulation)

Market abuse is split into two different aspects (under EU definitions):

1. Insider dealing: where a person who has information not available to other investors (for example, a director with knowledge of a takeover bid) makes use of that information for personal gain
2. Market manipulation: where a person knowingly gives out false or misleading information (for instance, about a company's financial circumstances) in order to influence the price of a share for personal gain

In 2013/2014, the EU updated its legislation on market abuse, and harmonised criminal sanctions. In the 2015 Danish European Union opt-out referendum, the Danish population rejected adoption of the 2014 market abuse directive (2014/57/EU) and much other legislation.

In the UK, the market abuse directive (MAD) was implemented in 2003 to reduce market abuse. It applied to any financial instrument admitted to trading on a regulated market or in respect of which a request for admission to trading had been made. MAD was subsequently replaced by the Market Abuse Regulation (MAR) in 2016.

== See also ==
- Anti-competitive practices
- Insider trading
- Financial Services and Markets Act 2000
- EU law
- ISO 37001 Anti-bribery management systems
- Group of States Against Corruption
- International Anti-Corruption Academy
- United Nations Convention against Corruption
- OECD Anti-Bribery Convention
