= Rural Business Investment Program =

The Rural Business Investment Program, established by the 2002 farm bill, (P.L. 107–171, Sec. 6029), guarantees the funds raised by companies that make equity investment in rural businesses, with an emphasis on smaller businesses. The program is modeled after the SBA Small Business Investment Program. (7 U.S.C. 2009cc).
