= Mondaq =

Legal content aggregator service

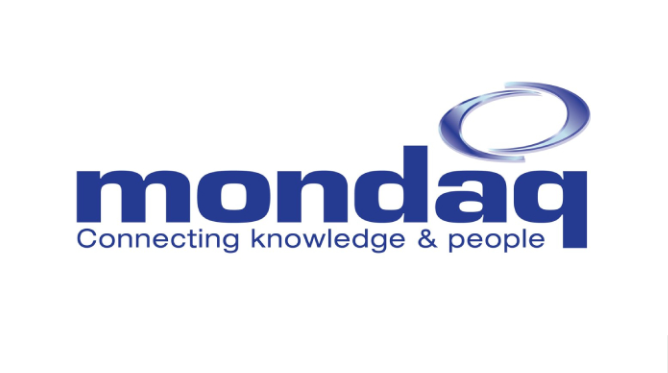
- Formation: 1994; 32 years ago
- Legal status: Active
- Headquarters: Bristol UK,
- Services: Communication
- Fields: Financial, and regulatory, and legal information
- Official language: English
- Website: www.mondaq.com

Mondaq Ltd. is a content aggregator service in the legal industry. Launched in 1994, the company is headquartered in Bristol UK, and operates worldwide. Through its online publications, Mondaq provides financial, regulatory, and legal information on topics such as employment, tax, litigation, healthcare, government, and real estate through online publications.

== Background ==
Mondaq is a content aggregator that organizes and publishes curated content from professional advisers, such as law firms and financial institutions. Mondaq provides information on topics such as employment, tax, litigation, healthcare, government, and real estate. By 2008, Mondaq was one of three main services in the aggregation market, along with Lexology, and Linex Legal—"mining" law firm publications for information and republishing the results. These three had the "broadest coverage" at that time. By 2017, Mondaq was still recommended along with Lexology and JD Supra among the top three Law Firm Newsletter Aggregators.

The company’s Thought Leadership Award aims to recognize the most popular articles and blogs, measured by total readership, over a six-month period of time. Articles are chosen from a wide variety of topics across 17 different countries.
