= Anil Sharma (Uttar Pradesh politician) =

Indian politician (1963–2026)

Anil Kumar Sharma

Member of the Uttar Pradesh legislative assembly
- In office 11 March 2017 – 2 September 2026
- Preceded by: Mukesh Sharma
- Constituency: Shikarpur, Bulandshahr
- In office May 2007 – March 2012
- Succeeded by: Banshi Singh
- In office February 2002 – May 2007
- Preceded by: Harpal Singh
- Constituency: Khurja, Bulandshahr

Minister of State for Forest, Environment, Zoological Garden Government of Uttar Pradesh
- In office 21 August 2019 – 12 March 2022
- Chief Minister: Yogi Adityanath

Personal details
- Born: Guddu Sharma; 26 June 1963 Surjawali, Bulandshahr district, Uttar Pradesh, India
- Died: 2 September 2026 (aged 63)
- Party: Bharatiya Janata Party
- Spouse: Moirta Sharma (m. 1987)
- Children: 2
- Parent: Vijay Kumar Sharma
- Education: Intermediate
- Occupation: MLA
- Profession: Politician

Anil Sharma (26 June 1963 – 2 September 2026) was an Indian politician who was a member of 18th and 17th Legislative Assembly of Uttar Pradesh. He represented the Shikarpur (Assembly constituency) in Bulandshahr district of Uttar Pradesh and was a member of the Bharatiya Janata Party.

== Background ==
Sharma was born in Surjawali village Bulandshahr district of Uttar Pradesh on 26 June 1963, to his father Vijay Kumar Sharma. He completed Intermediate education from Board of High School and Intermediate Education Uttar Pradesh.

In 1987, he married Moirta Sharma; they had one son and one daughter. Sharma died after a long illness on 2 September 2026, at the age of 63.

== Political career ==
Sharma started his journey in politics from the village head (Pradhan). In 1989, Anil Sharma was elected unopposed village head of the ancestral village Surjawali for the first time. After that, he became the village head for the second consecutive time.

In 2002, Anil Sharma was elected MLA from Khurja Assembly seat on Bahujan Samaj Party ticket for the first time. Then for the second consecutive time in 2007, Anil Sharma became MLA from Khurja. In the year 2012, Khurja seat was secured. He contested on the Bahujan Samaj Party ticket from Shikarpur Assembly seat but lost to SP's Mukesh Sharma. In the year 2017, he was elected MLA from Shikarpur Assembly seat as a member of Bharatiya Janata Party.

== Posts held ==
#	From	To	Position	Comments
1	February 2002	May 2007	Member, 14th Legislative Assembly of Uttar Pradesh	
2	May 2007	March 2012	Member, 15th Legislative Assembly of Uttar Pradesh	
3	March 2017	March 22	Member, 17th Legislative Assembly of Uttar Pradesh	
4	August 2019	March 2022	Minister of State for Forest, Environment, Zoological Garden in Government of Uttar Pradesh	
5	March 2022	Incumbent	18th Uttar Pradesh Assembly	
