= Dharpa =

Dharpa Dharpa Chuharpur
- village
- Location in Uttar Pradesh, India Dharpa (India)
- Coordinates: 28.30°N 77.90°E
- Country: India
- State: Uttar Pradesh
- District: Bulandshahr

Population
  - Total: approx. 3,500

Languages
  - Official: Hindi
- Time zone: UTC+5:30 (IST)
- PIN: 203131
- Nearest city: Khurja
- Lok Sabha constituency: Gautam Buddha Nagar
- Vidhan Sabha constituency: Khurja

Dharpa (also known as Dharpa Chuharpur) is a village in Khurja Tehsil in Bulandshahr District of Uttar Pradesh, India. It is situated on the Grand Trunk Road between Bulandshahr and Khurja, 14 km from Bulandshahr (south-east) and 5 km from Khurja (north-west).
