= Vijendra Singh Khatik =

Indian politician (born 1974)

Member of the Uttar Pradesh Legislative Assembly
- In office 2017–2022
- Preceded by: Banshi Singh
- Constituency: Khurja constituency

Personal details
- Born: 22 June 1974 (age 51) Umasamur, Bulandshahr, Uttar Pradesh
- Party: Bhartiya Janata Party
- Spouse: Dayawati Singh (m. 1994)
- Parent: Hari Singh (father)
- Education: Literate
- Occupation: Politician
- Profession: Business

Vijendra Singh Khatik is an ex member of the Uttar Pradesh Legislative Assembly from the Khurja constituency in Bulandshahar district.

== Early life and education ==
Khatik was born 22 June 1974 in Umasamur village Bulandshahr district of Uttar Pradesh to his father Hari Singh. In 1994, he married Dayawati Singh Khatik, they have two sons. He is literate.

== Political career ==
Khatik started his journey in politics from the Block pramukh of Khurja. In 2017, 17th Legislative Assembly of Uttar Pradesh he was elected MLA from Khurja Assembly Constituency in Bulandashahar district of Uttar Pradesh. He defeated his nearest rival Bahujan Samaj Party candidate Arjun Singh by a huge margin of 64,299 votes.

== Post held ==
| # | From | To | Position | Comments |
|---|---|---|---|---|
| 1 | March 2017 | Incumbent | Member, 17th Legislative Assembly of Uttar Pradesh | |
