= Shahzadpur Kanaini =

Shahzadpur Kanaini is a village 8 km from Khurja town in Bulandshahr District, Uttar Pradesh, India. It is mainly inhabited by scheduled castes and a Jat community of the Balyan & Narwar clan. Nearby villages include Samaspur and Sarangpur.
