= Culture of Uttar Pradesh =

Indian culture with roots in Hindi and Urdu culture

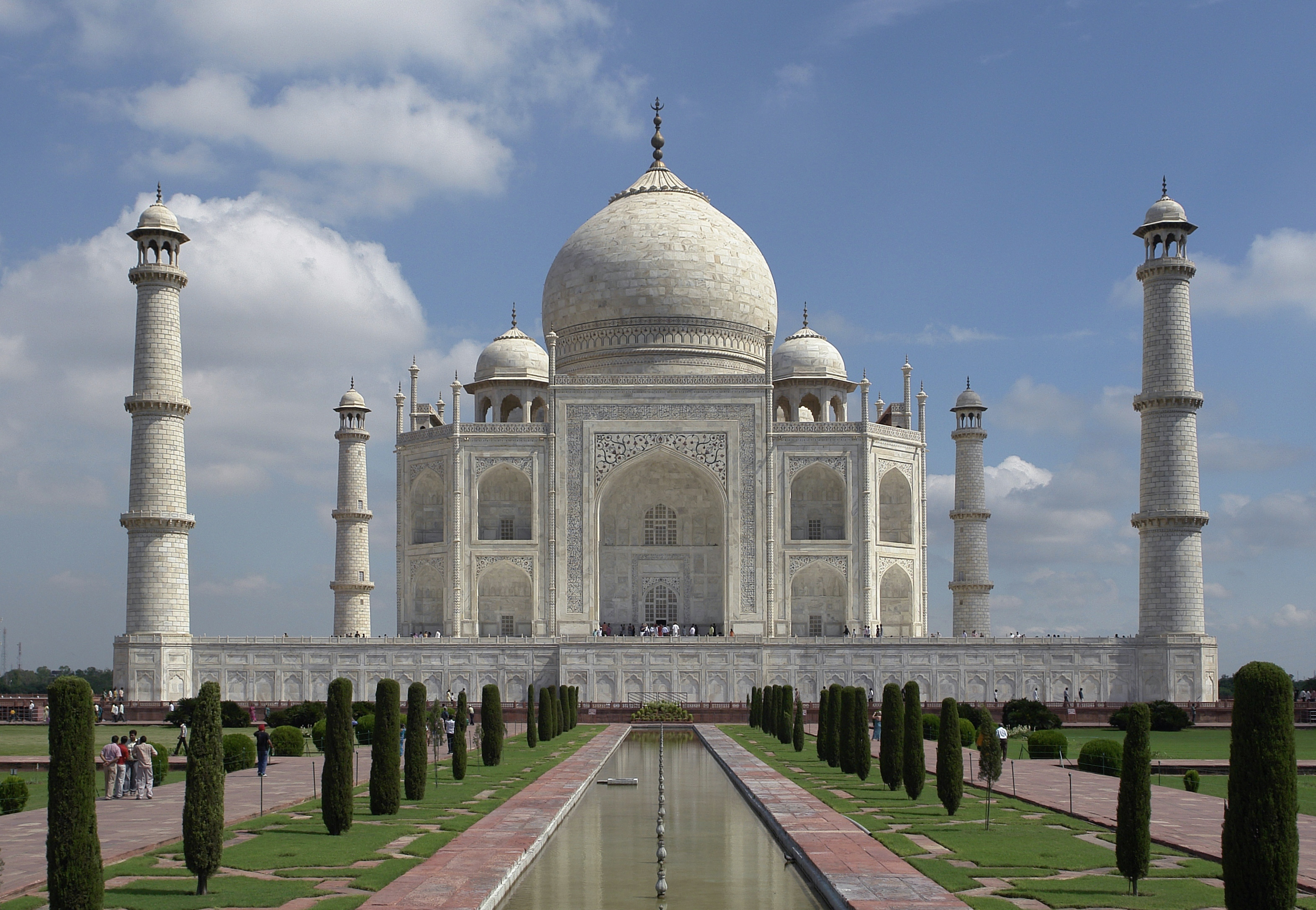
The Taj Mahal, a mausoleum in Uttar Pradesh, draws many visitors

The culture of Uttar Pradesh has been shaped by its ancient Hindu roots, medieval and early modern Muslim empires, and its place in the struggle for independence from colonial rule. Modern Uttar Pradesh citizens are largely rural Hindu agriculturalists, with a large minority of Muslims concentrated in its cities.

== Languages ==
A 2023 survey of the linguistic diversity of Uttar Pradesh found 101 different languages in the region out of the 122 languages found across India. Hindi and Urdu are collectively spoken by 80% of the population. Six varieties of Hindi are found in the region: Kauravi, Awadhi, Braj Bhasha, Bundeli, Bagheli and Kanauji. Bhojpuri is the second most spoken language in the state, spoken by 11% of the population. It is the native language of eastern Uttar Pradesh.

Standard Hindi was declared the official language of Uttar Pradesh in 1968 and is widely spoken in the region today. As of 2025 legislators in Uttar Pradesh may also communicate in four of the widely-spoken native languages Awadhi, Bhojpuri, Bundeli, and Braj Bhasha while in session. Widely spoken among the Muslim population of Uttar Pradesh, Urdu was recognized as the second official language of the state in 1989, although the law limited its official use to specific contexts.

== Religion ==
Uttar Pradesh is home to important Hindu, Muslim, and Buddhist holy sites and associated pilgrimages, including the holy city of Varanasi, the sacred Ganges river, and Mathura, regarded in some traditions as the birthplace of Krishna and Rama.

An estimated 400 million pilgrims arrived in Prayagraj (Allahabad) to take part in the 2025 Maha Kumbha Mela, making it the world's biggest religious gathering. The event takes place once every 12 years, but smaller gatherings occur more frequently.

Another significant Hindu pilgrimage site, Varanasi, is strongly associated with death and reincarnation. Mourners bring the ashes of loved ones to be scattered here, and those near death make the pilgrimage in hopes of dying in what they regard as the home of Lord Shiva. Although a variety of funerary traditions take place in Varanasi, it's common to carry the dead down the ghats to bathe in the Ganges prior to a funeral pyre.

Holi celebrations also draw visitors to Uttar Pradesh with unique local traditions like the Lathmar Holi. The Lathmar Holi celebrates a story of the courtship of Krishna and Radha in which Radha and her friend drove the god from Barsana with sticks. Today, the residents of Barsana recreate this event, as the women hurl sticks at the men participating in the ritual. Chhath Puja is the biggest festival of eastern Uttar Pradesh.

== Architecture ==
Uttar Pradesh is home to multiple World Heritage Sites celebrating the historical architecture of the region, including the Taj Mahal, Agra Fort and the nearby Fatehpur Sikri.

- The Agra Fort (also called the Red Fort of Agra) was the imperial city of the 16th century Mughal rulers and contains several palaces, audience halls, and mosques.
- Fatehpur Sikri ("The City of Victory") was built in three years on the order of the Mughal emperor Akbar between 1571 and 1573 to serve as the new capital city of the Mughal empire.
- The Taj Mahal is a 17th-century mausoleum built by Mughal Emperor Shah Jahan in memory of his beloved wife, Mumtaz Mahal.

== Dance and Music ==
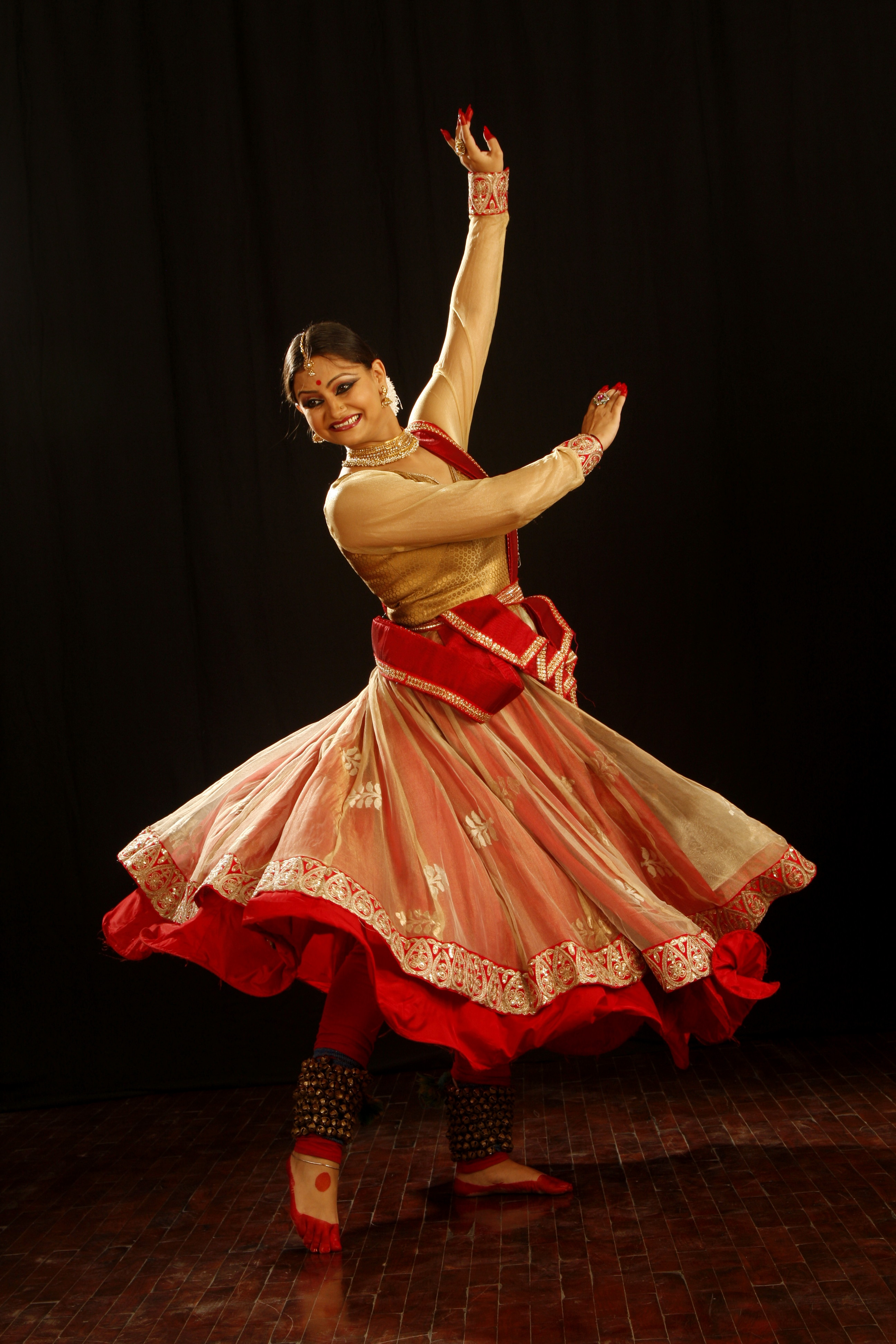
Kathak

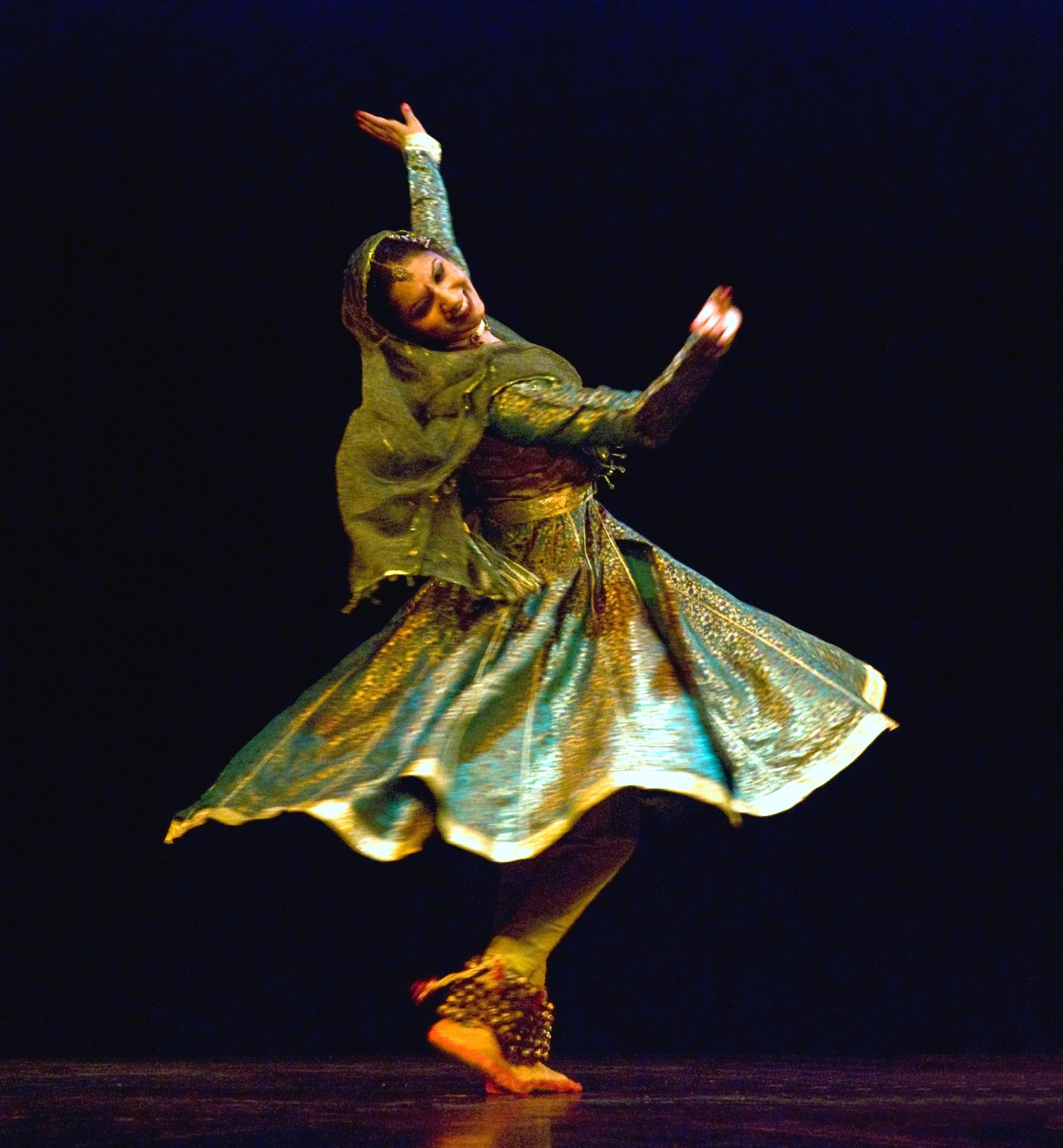
Clothing and dance indigenous to Uttar Pradesh.

During the Gupta and Harsh Vardhan eras, Uttar Pradesh was a centre for musical innovation. Swami Haridas was a musician who championed Hindustani Classical Music. Tansen, a musician in Mughal Emperor Akbar's court, was a disciple of Swami Haridas.

A popular form of classical dance in Northern India, Kathak originated in Uttar Pradesh in the 18th century as part of temple worship in Vrindavan and Mathura. Wajid Ali Shah, the last Nawab of Awadh, was a patron and champion of Kathak. Today, the state is home to three prominent schools of this dance form, Lucknow Gharana, Jaipur Gharana and Banaras Gharana.

Music personalities including Naushad Ali, Talat Mehmood, Begum Akhtar, Anup Jalota, Shubha Mudgal, Bismillah Khan, Ravi Shankar, Kishan Maharaj, Vikash Maharaj, Hari Prasad Chaurasia, Gopal Shankar Misra, Siddheshwari Devi, Girija Devi and Sir Cliff Richard were originally from Uttar Pradesh.

The region's folk heritage includes songs called rasiya (especially popular in Braj), which celebrate the mythological love of Radha and Krishna. These songs are accompanied by large drums known as bumb and are performed at many festivals. Other folk dances or folk theater forms include Raslila, Swang, Ramlila (a dramatic enactment of the entire Ramayana), Nautanki, Naqal (mimicry) and Qawwali.

The Bhatkhande Music Institute is situated in Lucknow.

== Tourism ==
Uttar Pradesh attracts large number of visitors, both national and international; with more than 71 million domestic tourists (in 2003) and almost 25% of the All-India foreign tourists visiting Uttar Pradesh, it is one of the top tourist destinations in India. There are two regions in the state where a majority of the tourists go, the Hindu pilgrimage circuit and the Agra circuit.

The pilgrimage circuit includes the most religiously prestigious of the cities considered holy in Hinduism on the banks of the Ganges and Yamuna, rivers which are also considered sacred: Varanasi, Ayodhya ( the birthplace of Rama), Mathura ( the birthplace of Krishna), Vrindavan (where Lord Krishna spent his childhood), and Allahabad (Prayagraj) (the confluence or 'holy-sangam' of the Ganges-Yamuna rivers).

Dayal Bagh in Agra is a modern-day temple and tourist site with lifelike marble sculptures.

Prem Mandir, Vrindavan, is called the "temple of love."

== Protected areas ==
Some of the main natural protected areas in Uttar Pradesh are:-

- Dudhwa National Park is one of the best tiger reserves in the country.
- Pilibhit Tiger Reserve – home to the Tiger Reserve.situated in district Pilibhit.
- Sandi Bird Sanctuary – houses about 20,000 migratory birds annually.
- Katarniaghat Wildlife Sanctuary – the most concentrated sanctuary in India with a large population of tigers as well as leopards – situated in Bahraich and bordering Nepal is also worth a visit.

Some areas require a special permit for non-Indians to visit.

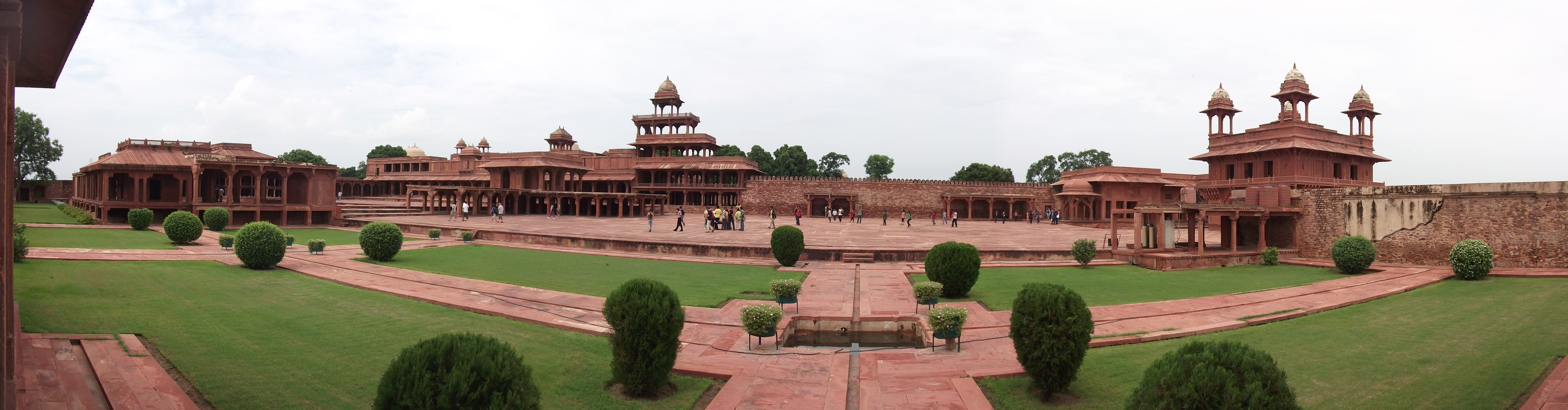
Panoramic view of a part of the Fatehpur Sikri Palace

== Dress ==
The people of Uttar Pradesh wear a variety of native- and Western-style dress. Traditional styles of dress include colourful draped garments – such as sari and ghagra choli for women and dhoti or lungi for men – and tailored clothes such as salwar kameez for women and kurta-pyjama for men. Men also often sport a headgear like topi or pagri. Sherwani is a more formal male dress and is frequently worn along with chooridar on festive occasions. European-style trousers and shirts are also common among men. Young adults are most commonly found in jeans and t-shirts.

== Arts and crafts ==
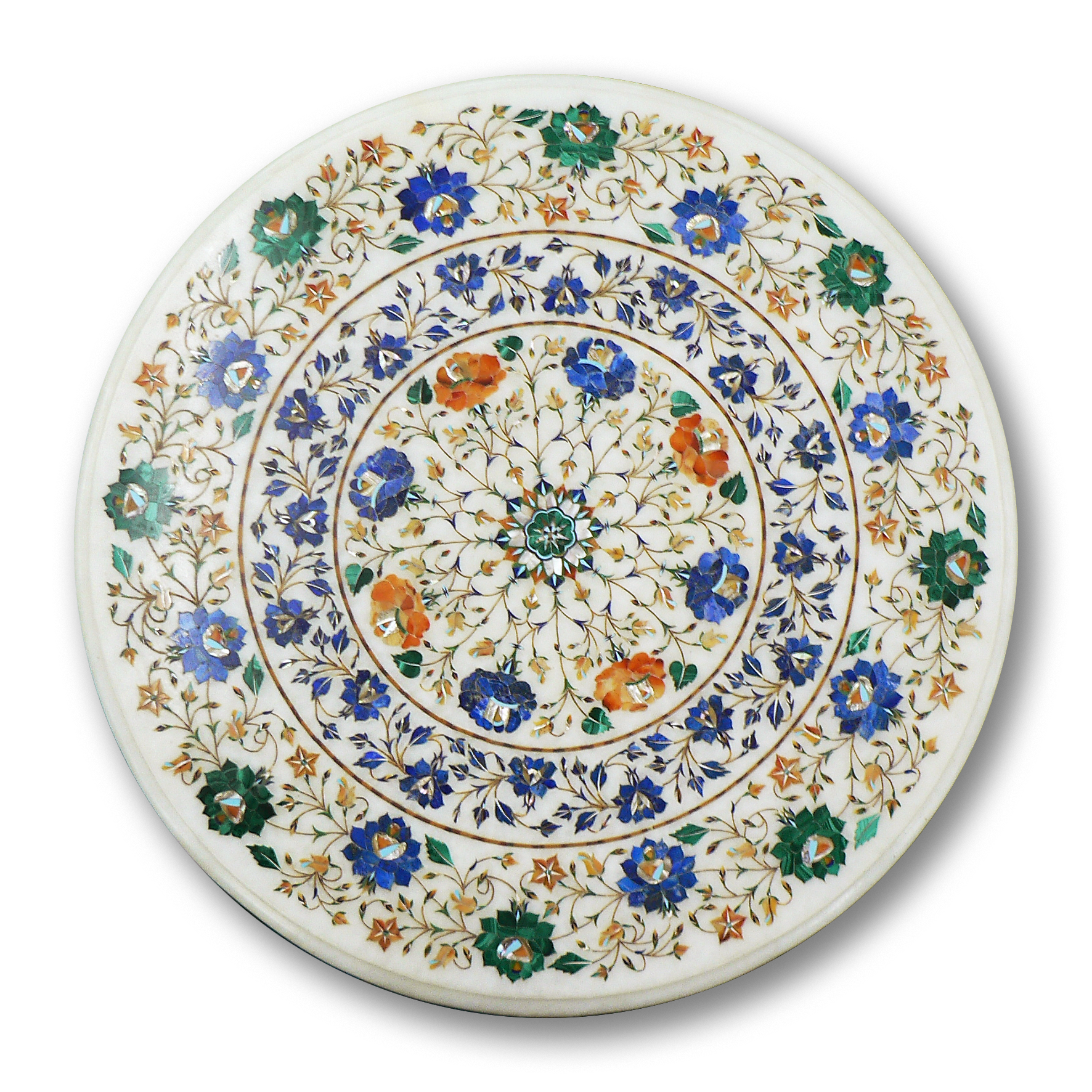
A Pietra Dura marble table top (Agra)

Uttar Pradesh includes many historical and modern centres of artistic movements and crafts, and Allahabad (Prayagraj) is home to the National Institute of Art & Craft College.

=== Textile arts ===
Zardozi and chikankari are both traditions of embroidery that employ metal wire.

Banarasi saris are similarly notable for their use of metal thread in weaving the brocade.

Bhadohi produces carpets, a craft which dates back to the 16th century during the reign of Mughal Emperor, Akbar Bhadohi carpets received the Geographical Indication (GI) tag in 2010, and it is one of the highest revenue-generating districts of UP.

=== Pottery ===
Introduced by an Afghan military campaign over 500 years ago, Khurja pottery is often confused with a similar tradition in Jaipur, but received its Geographic Indication tag recognizing its uniqueness in 2015. Its artisans closely guard the secret of its distinctive blue glaze.

Gorakhpur's animal sculptural tradition commonly depicts horses, elephants, camels, and oxen. It received its Geographic Indication tag in 2020.

Characterized by its recognizing the metallic black finish and silvery etched designs inspired by medieval Bidriware, the origins of the black pottery of Nizamabad remain unclear. Local folklore generally places its origin in the Mughal period and attributes it to Gujarat artisans who immigrated to the Uttar Pradesh. The tradition received its Geographic Indication tag in 2015.

=== Jewelry and metalwork ===
The region is famous for its Jhumka earrings and bangles from Firozabad.

=== Other traditions ===
- Agra, home since the Mughal era to Mughal crafts, including the Pietra Dura, still practised today.
- Aligarh is known for its Manja and Surma (Kohl).
- Firozabad is known for its glasswork.
- Moradabad produces metal-ware, especially brass artefacts.
- Pilibhit produces wooden footwear (locally called Paduka or Khadaon) and also flutes made of wooden pipes which are exported to Europe, America and other countries.
- Saharanpur produces wood-carving items.

At Sarnath are also the Pillars of Ashoka and the Lion Capital of Ashoka, archaeological artefacts with national significance. Ghazipur, 80 km from Varanasi, has Ganges Ghats and the Tomb of British potentate Lord Cornwallis, maintained by the Archaeologic survey of India.

== Gallery of tourist sites ==
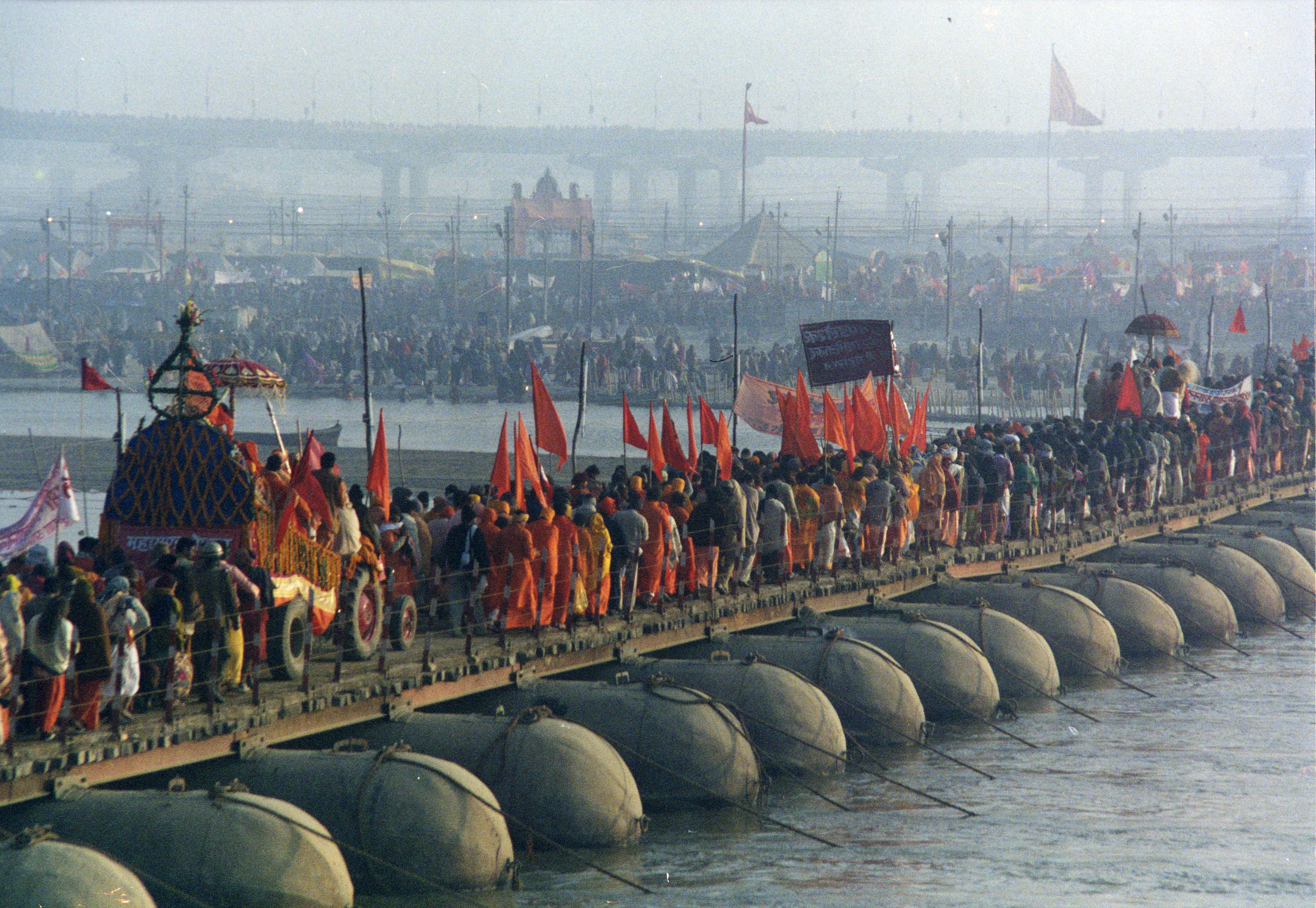
Kumbh Mela, at Prayagraj is the largest gathering anywhere in the world.

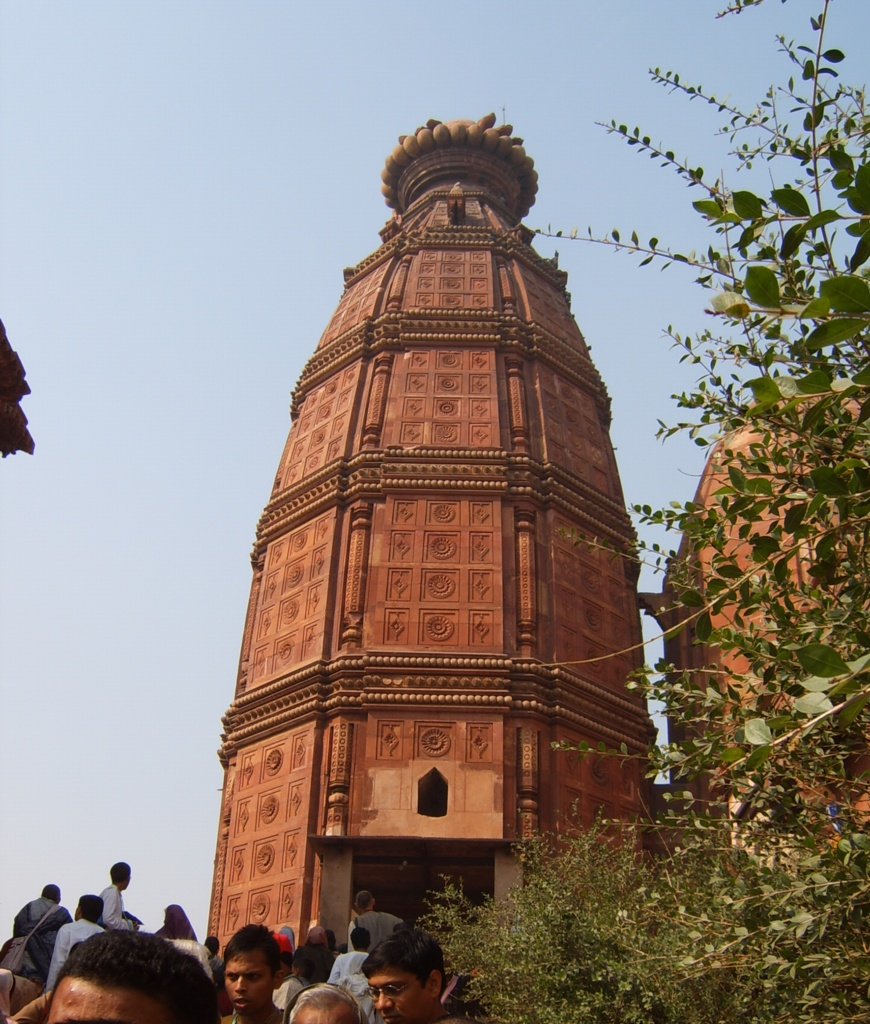
Madan Mohan temple in Vrindavan.

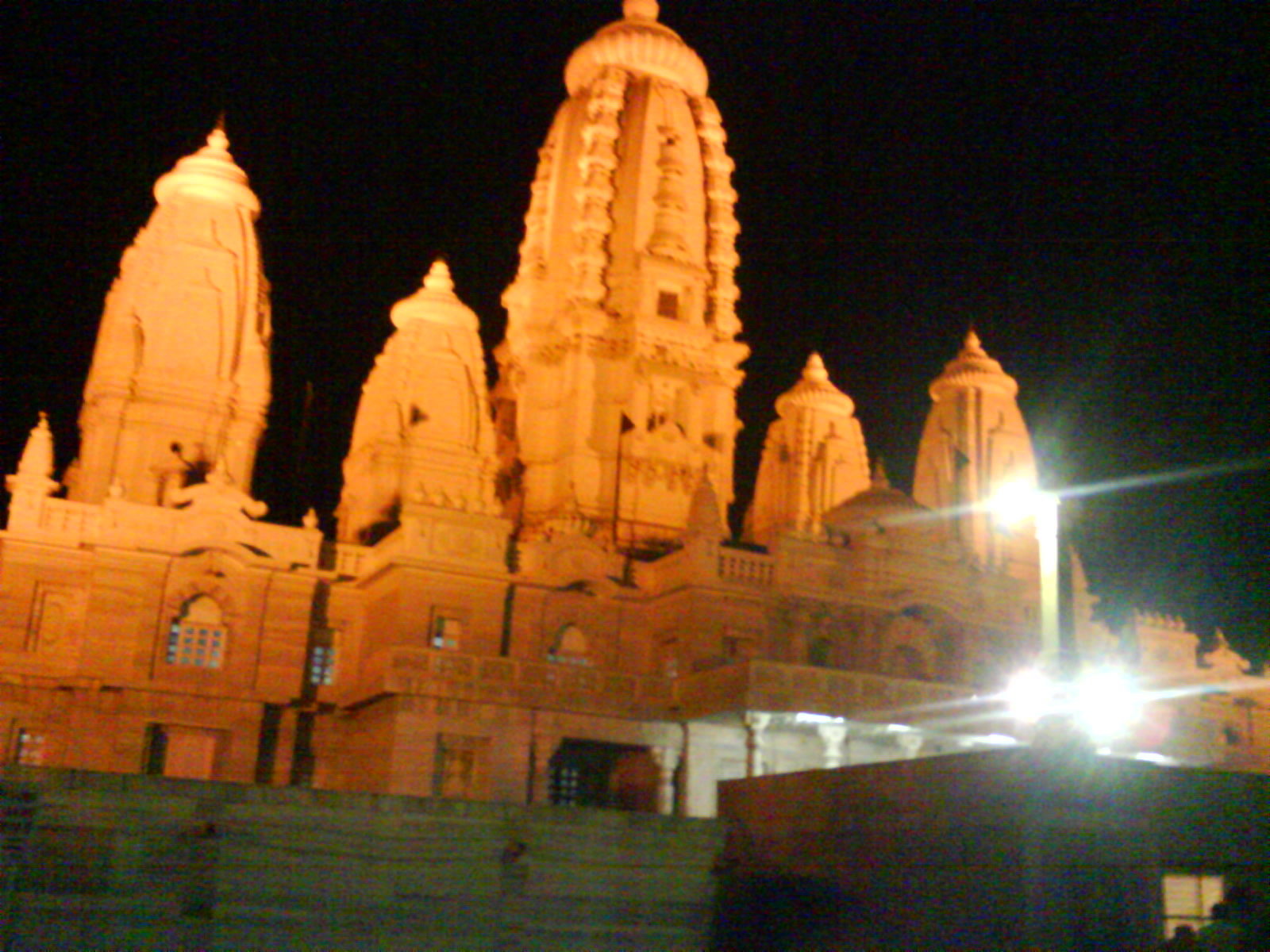
JK Temple (RadhaKrishna Temple), Kanpur

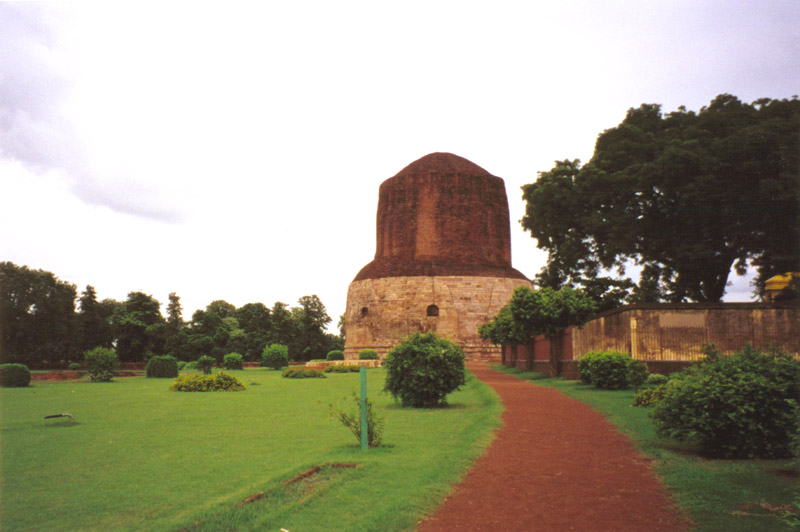
The Dhamekh Stupa is located in Sarnath where Gautama Buddha first taught the Dharma

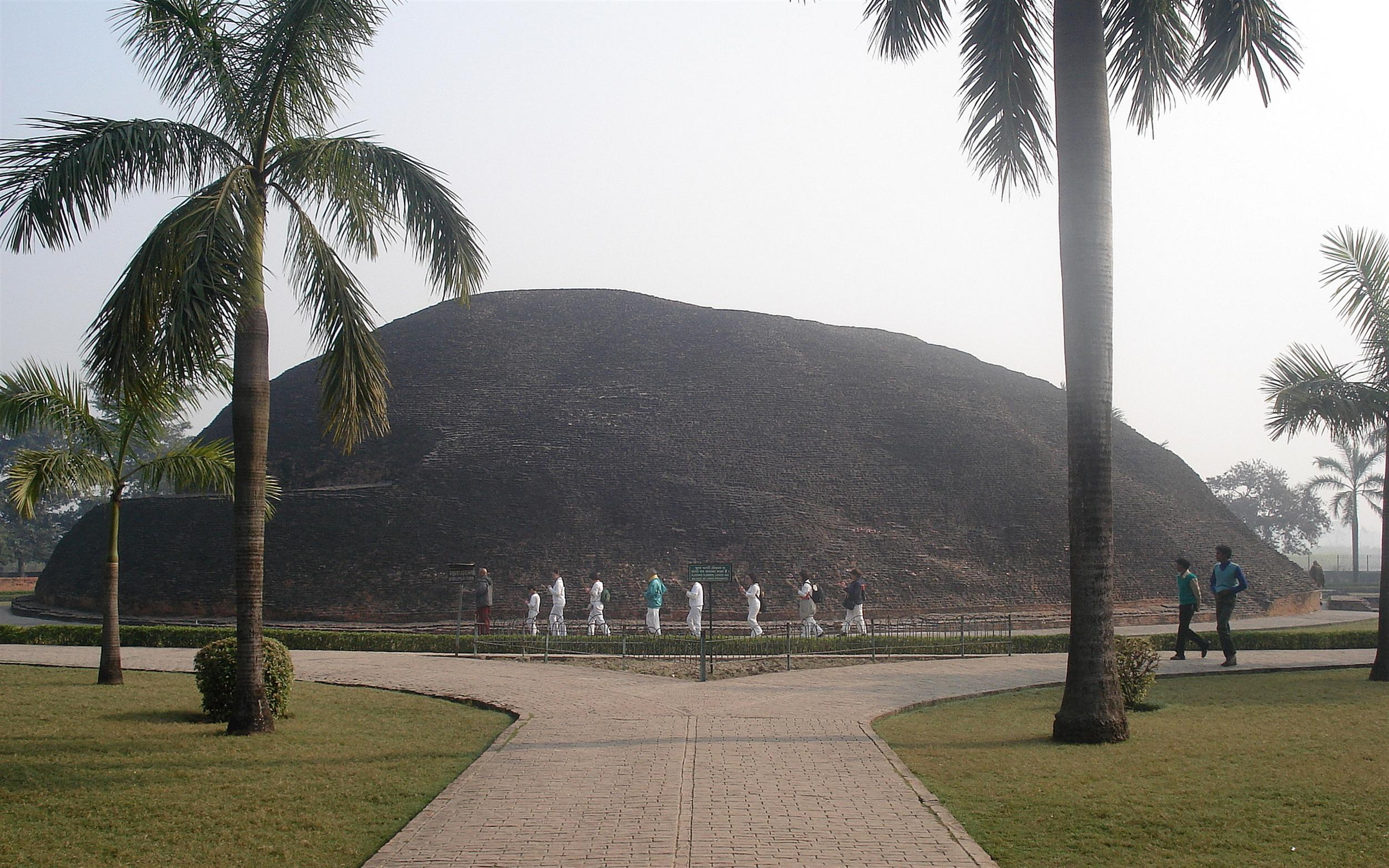
Kushinagar is a town where Gautama Buddha died

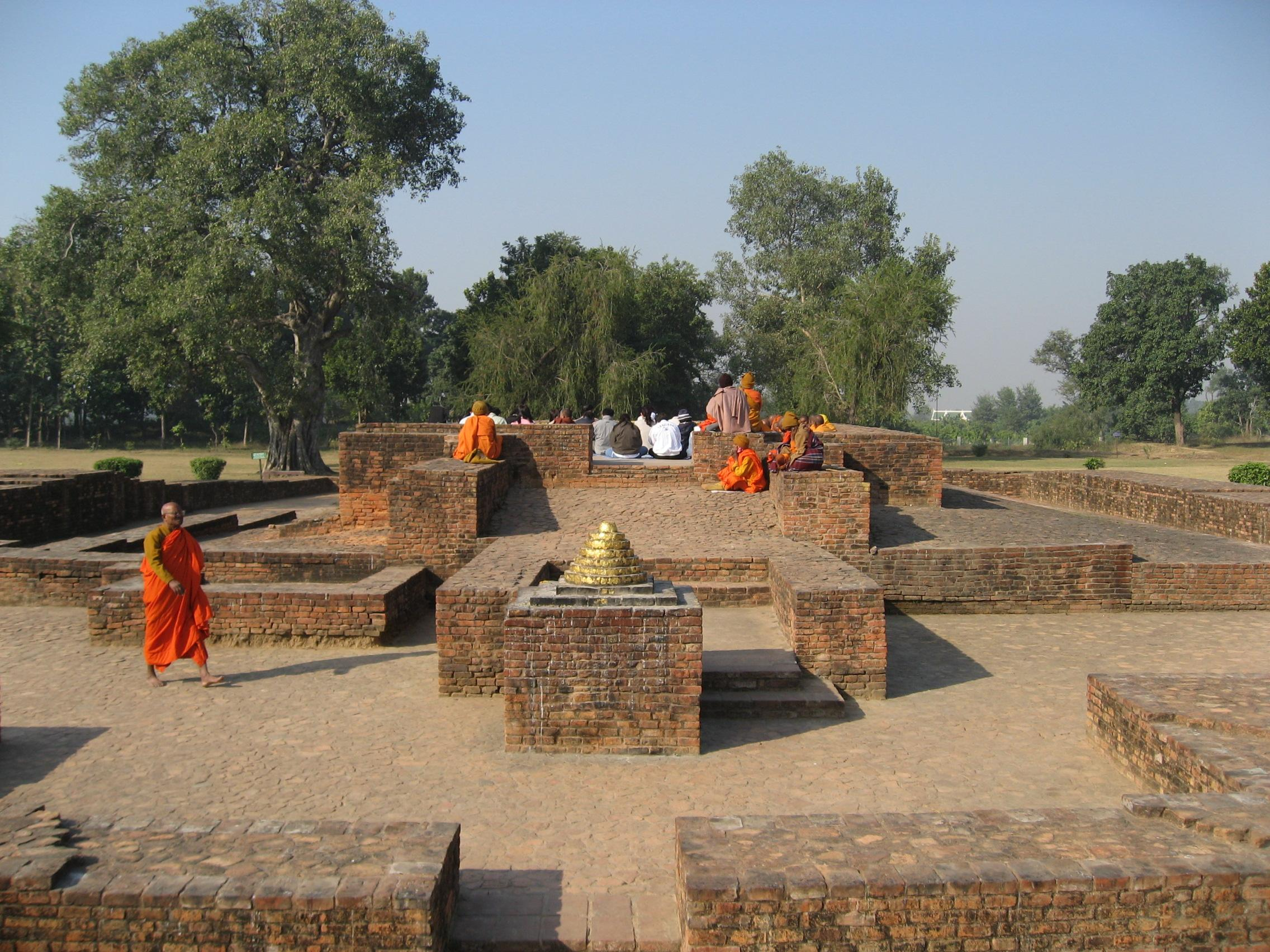
Gandhakuti (Buddha's hut) in Jetavana, Shravasti.

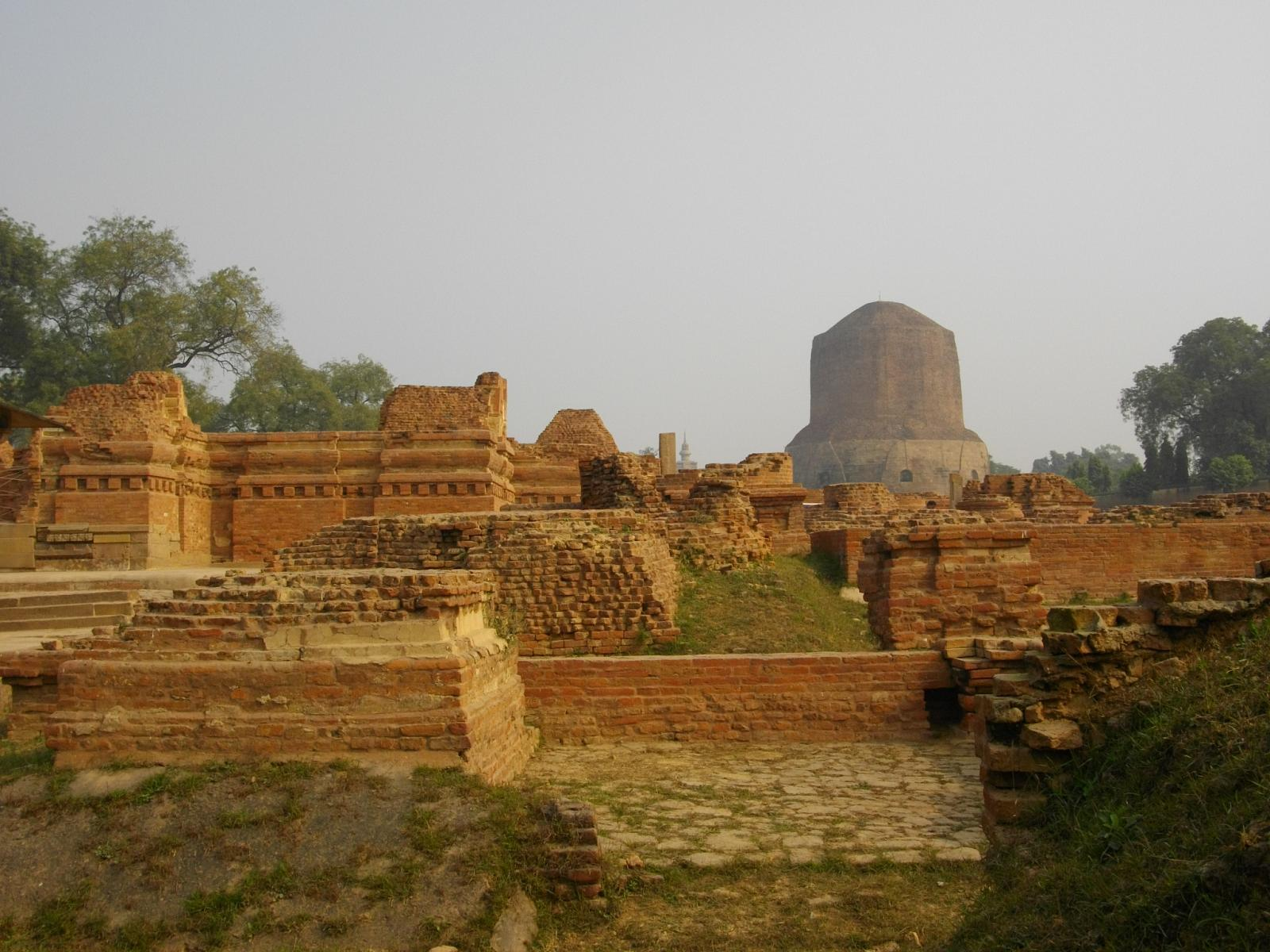
Ancient Buddhist monasteries near Dhamekh Stupa, Sarnath.

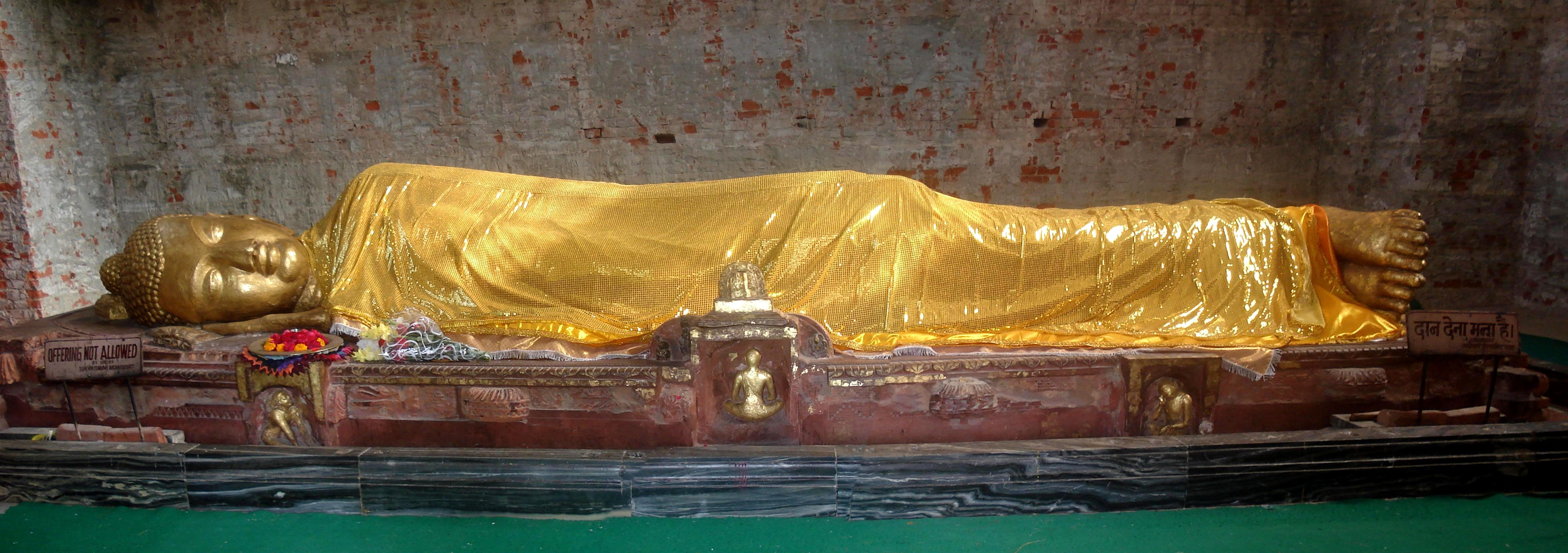
The ancient excavated Buddha inside the Parinirvana Temple, Kushinagar.

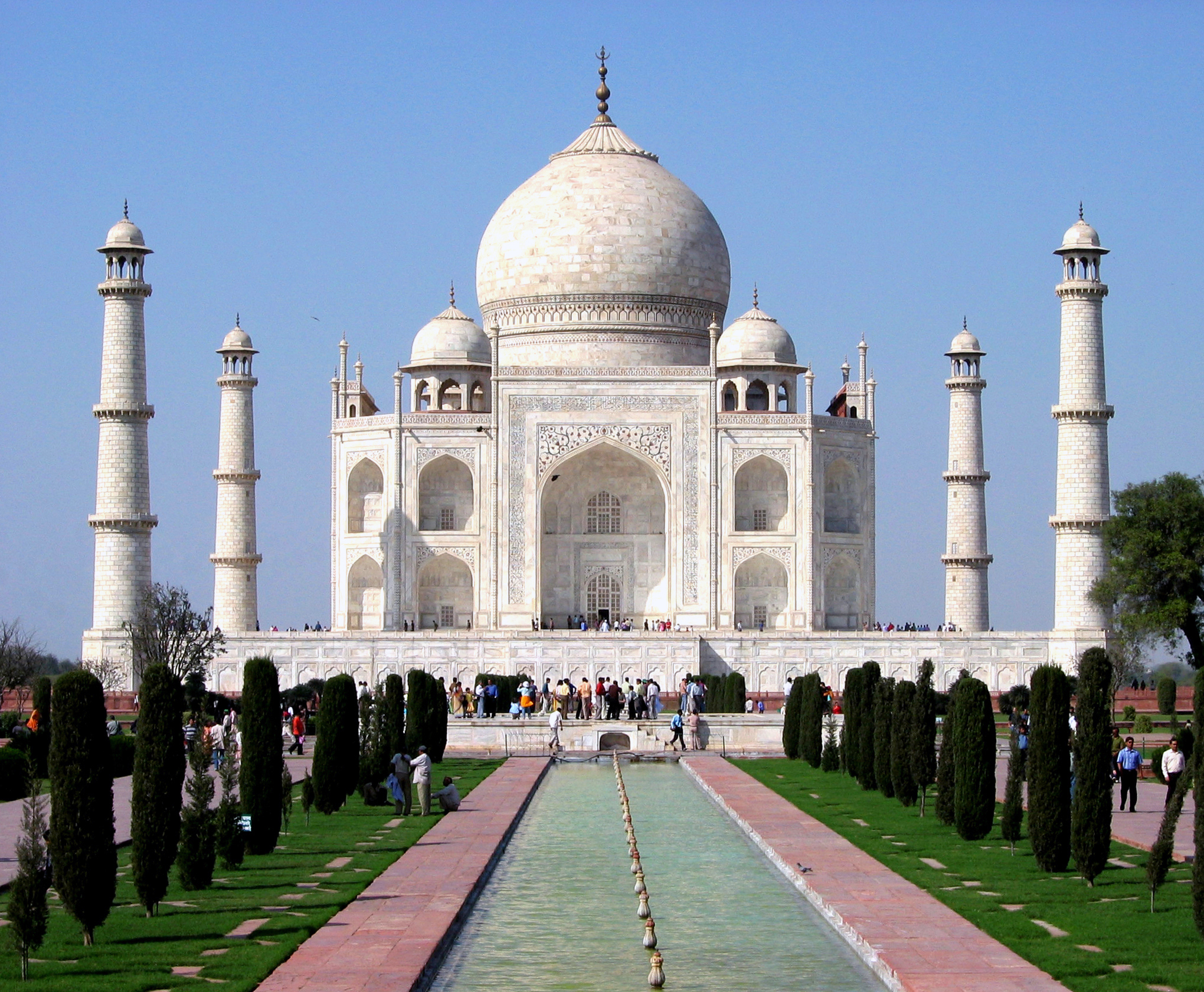
Taj Mahal, Agra

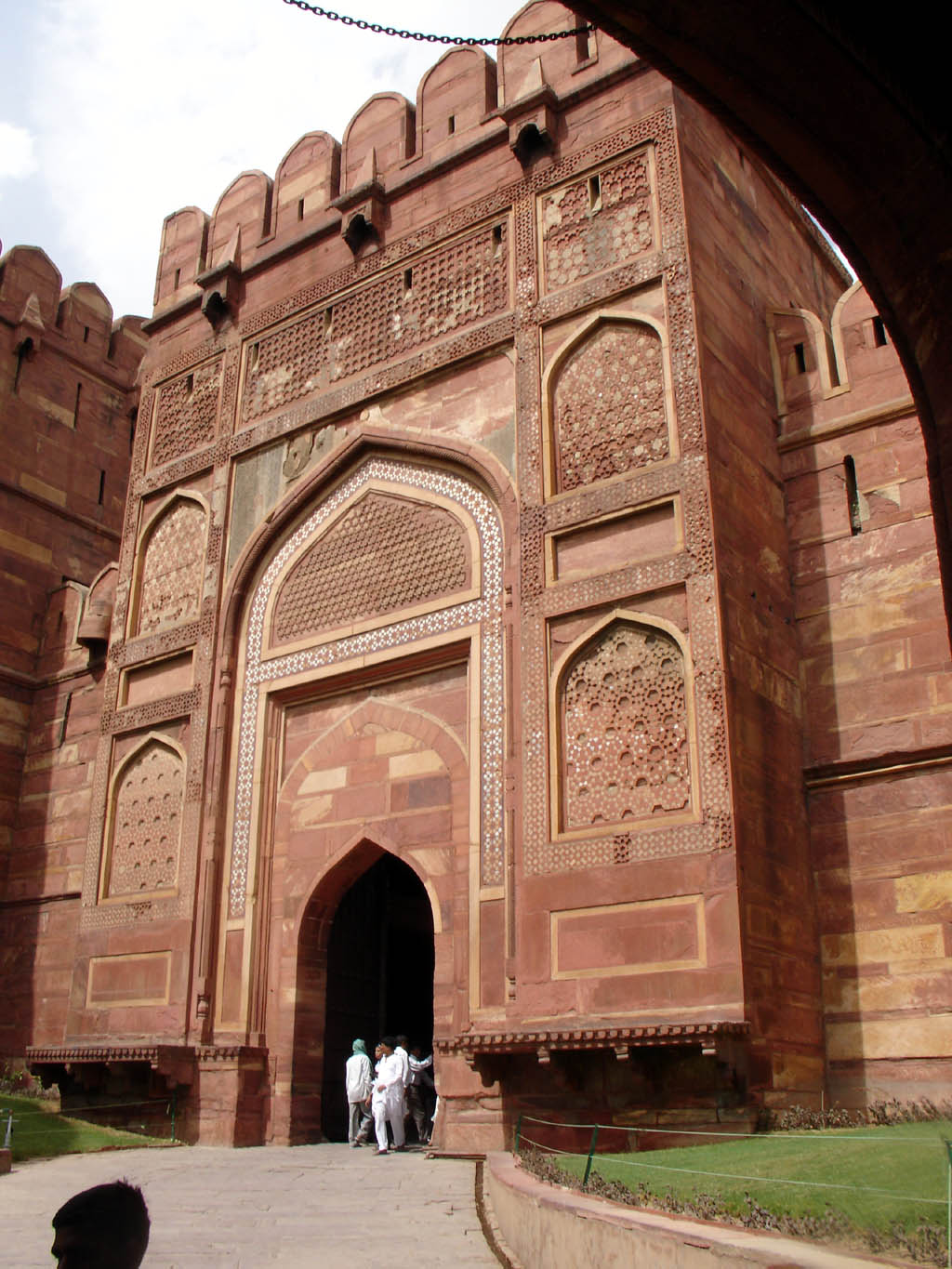
Amar Singh Gate at Agra Fort

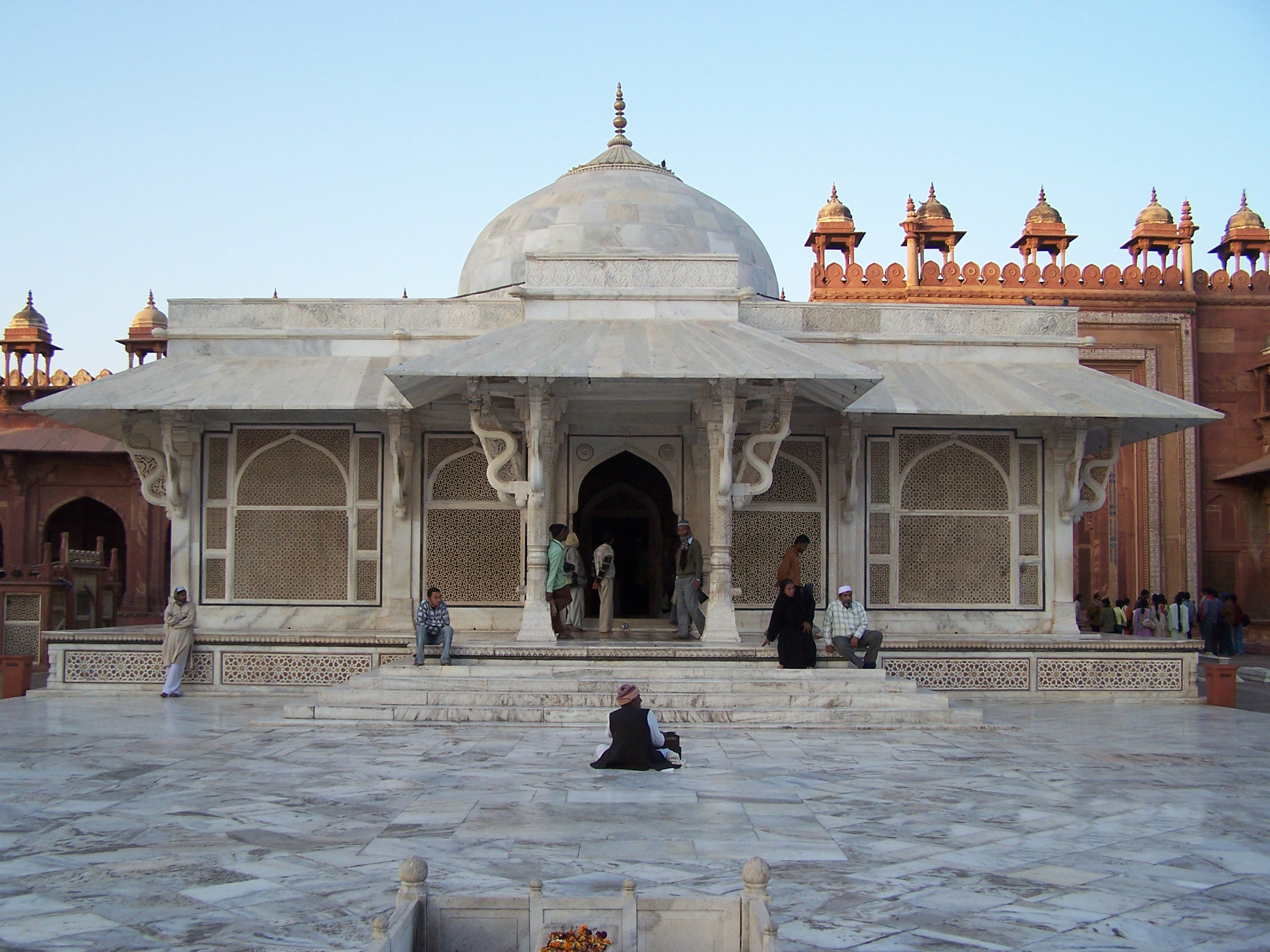
The Tomb of Salim Chisti

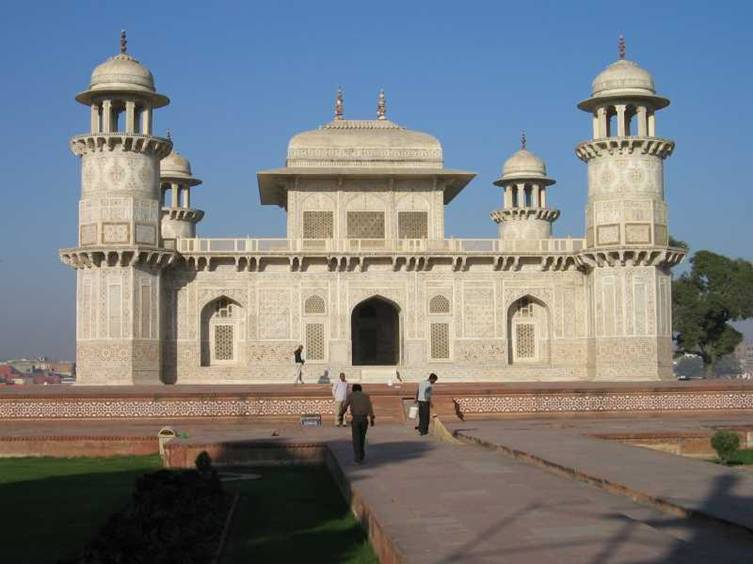
Itmad-Ud-Daulah's Tomb at Agra

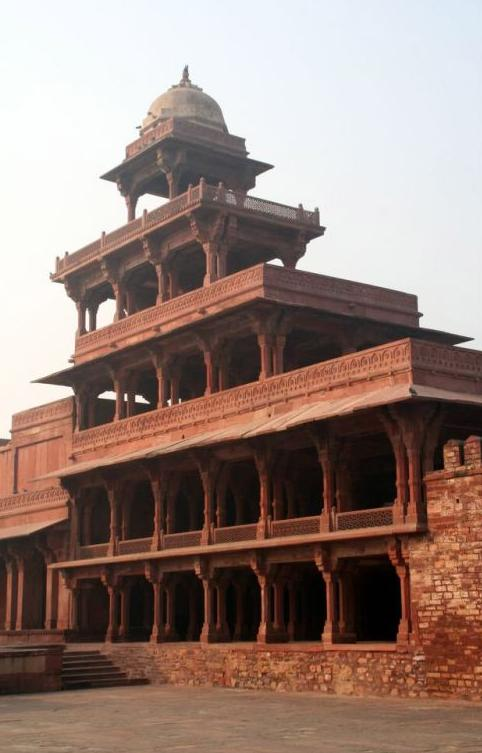
The five-storey Panch Mahal at Fatehpur Sikri

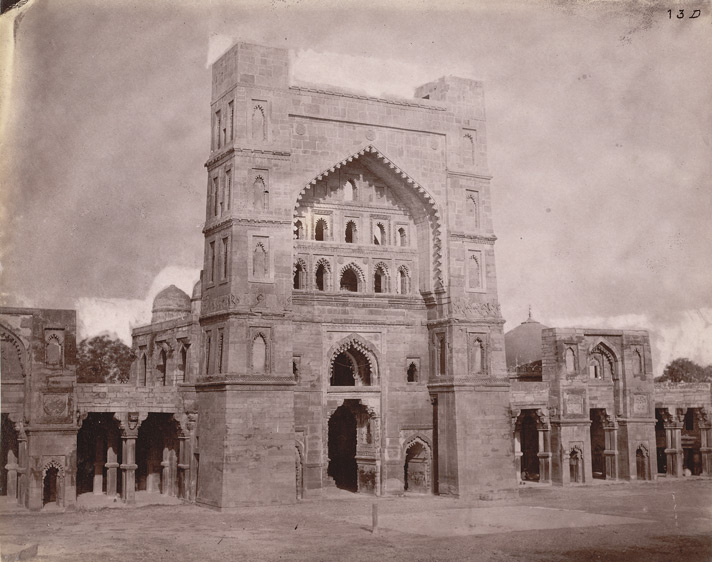
The historical Atala Masjid built by 'Sultan Ibrahim', Sultan of Jaunpur.

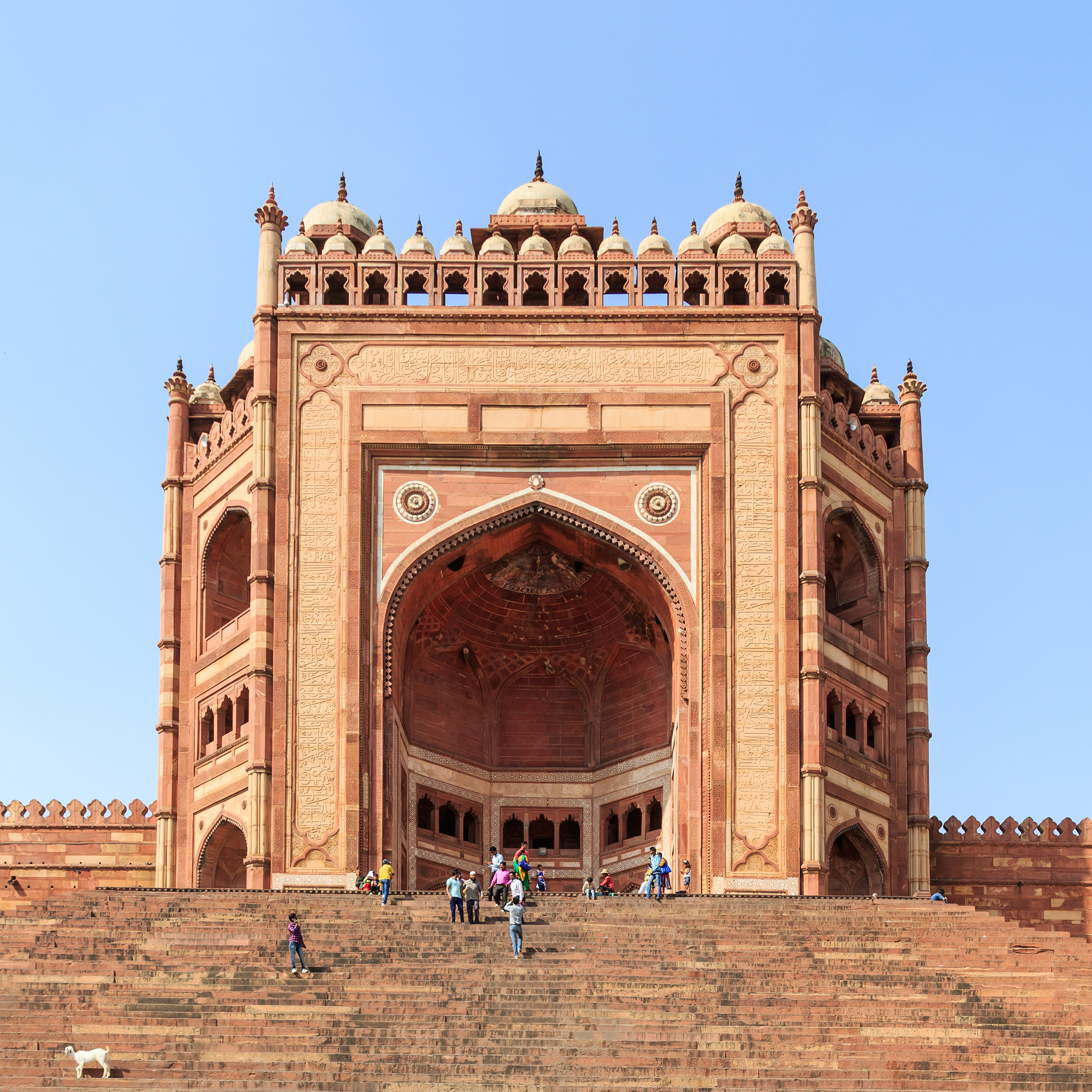
Buland Darwaza (Great Gate), Fatehpur Sikri

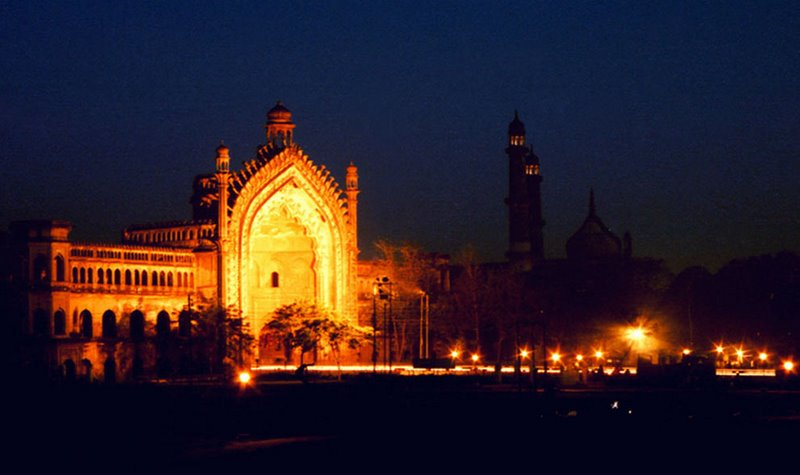
Roomi Darwaza, Lucknow

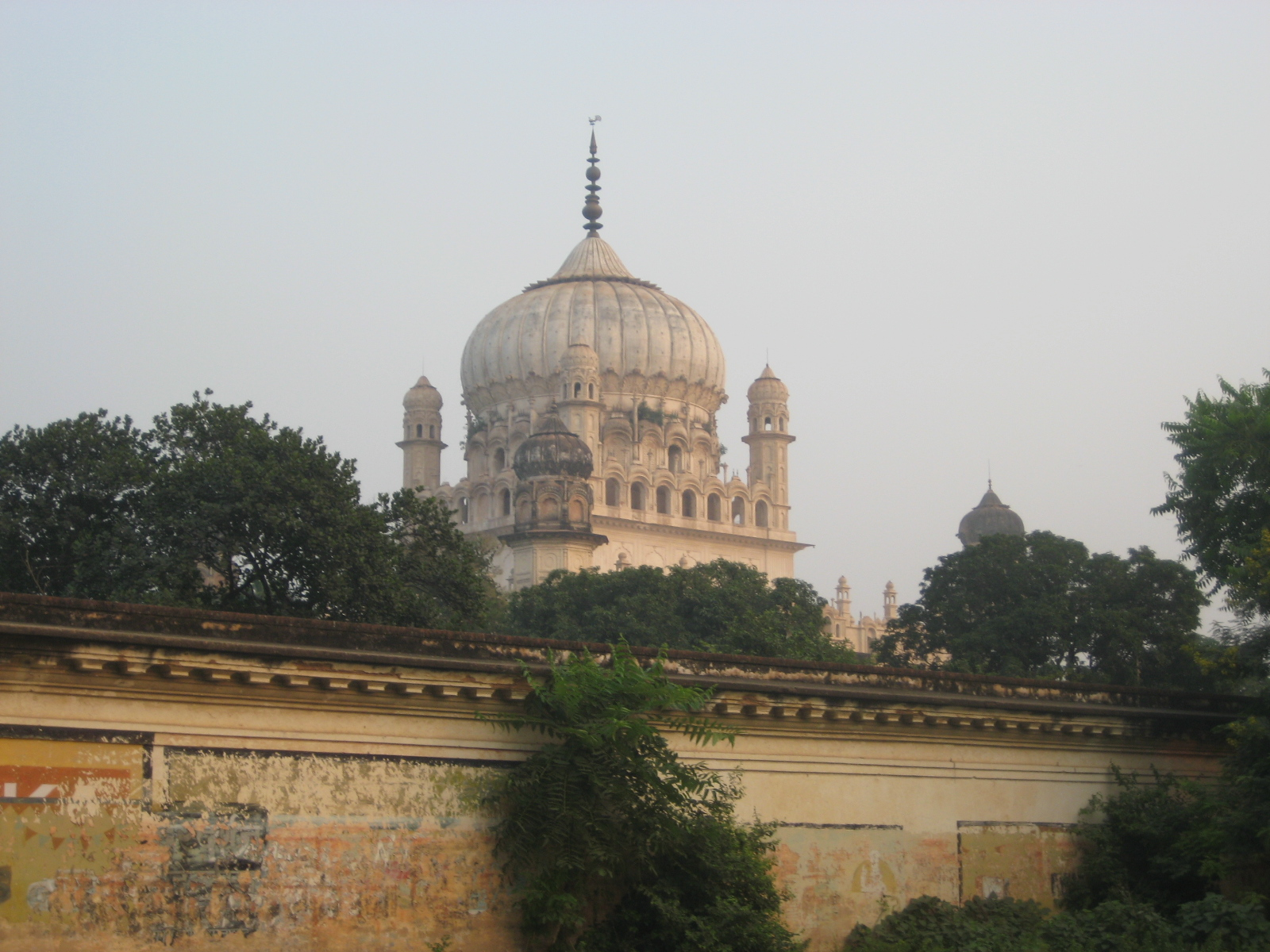
Tomb Queen Bride in Faizabad.

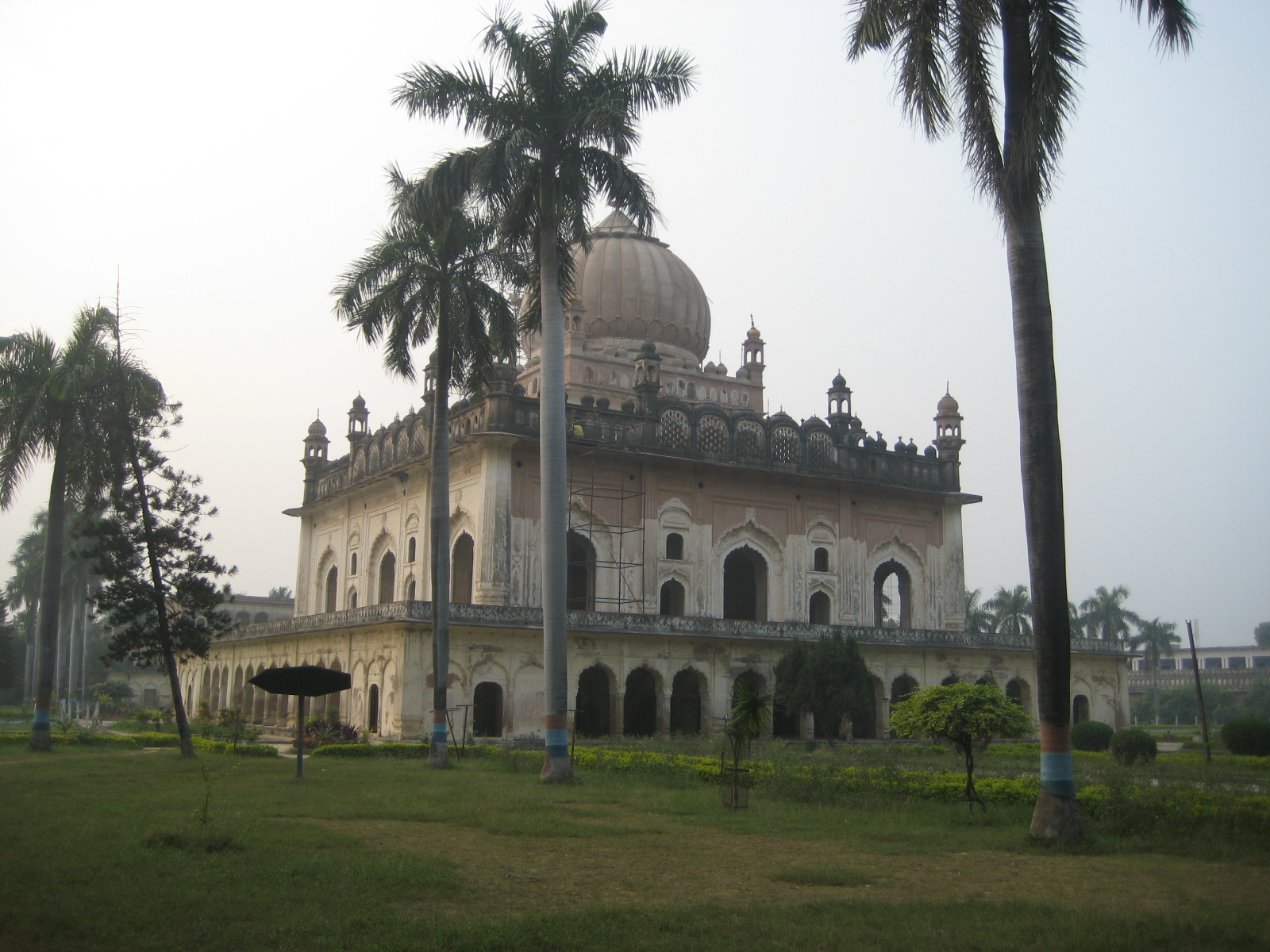
Mausoleum of Nawab Shuja-ud-Daula in Faizabad Gulabbadi.

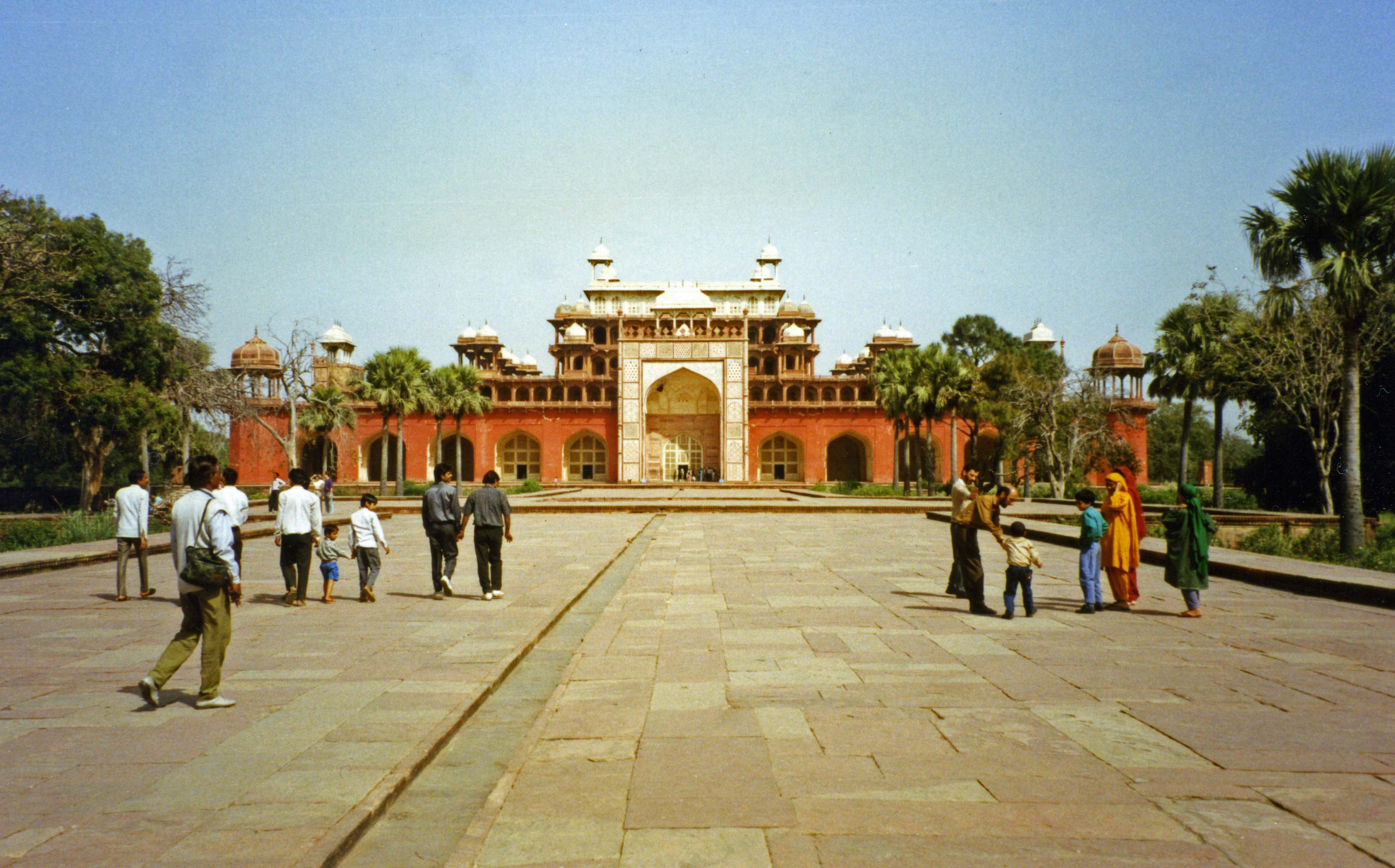
Tomb of Akbar the Great, Agra

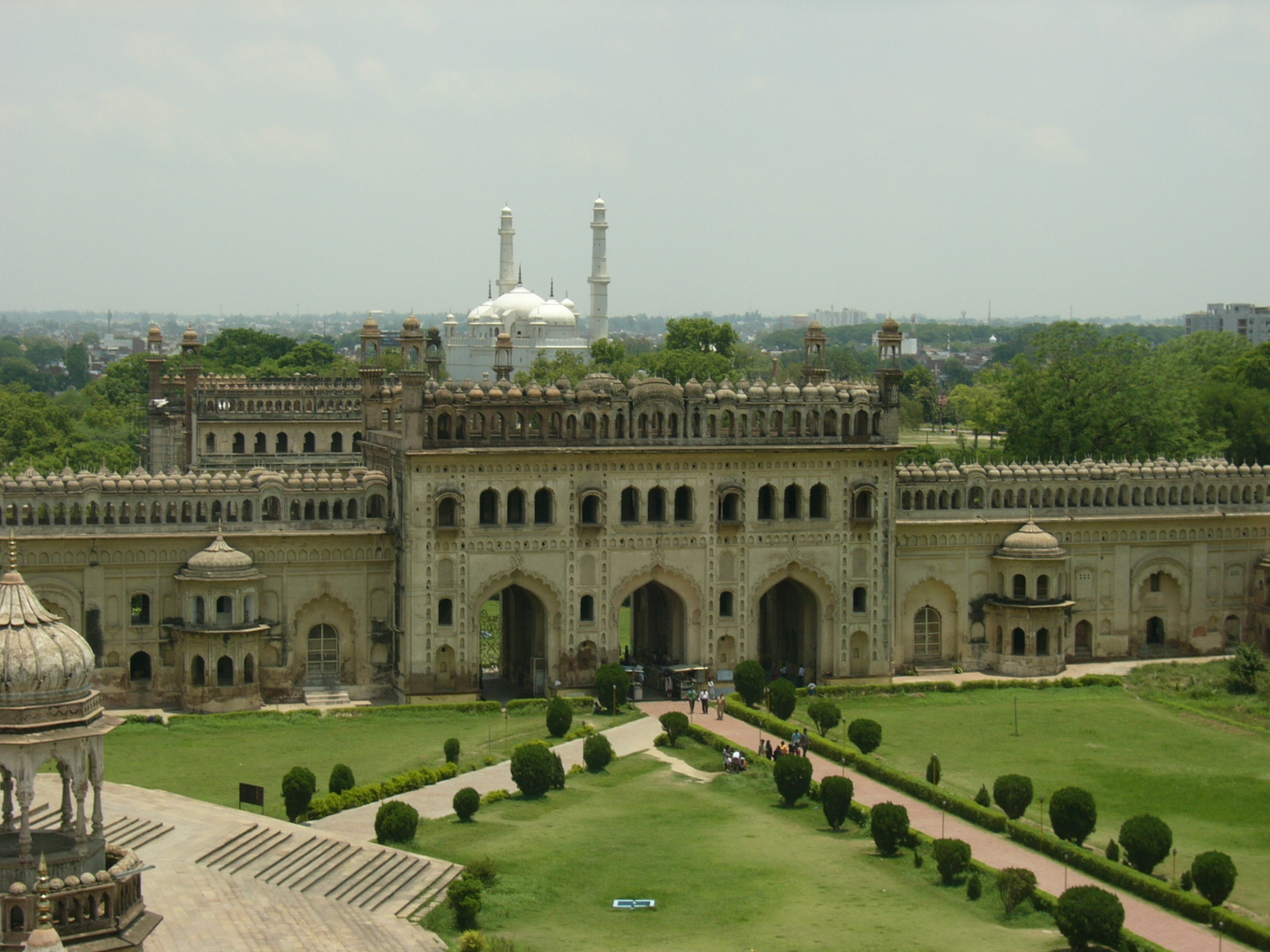
Gateway to Bara Imambara, Lucknow

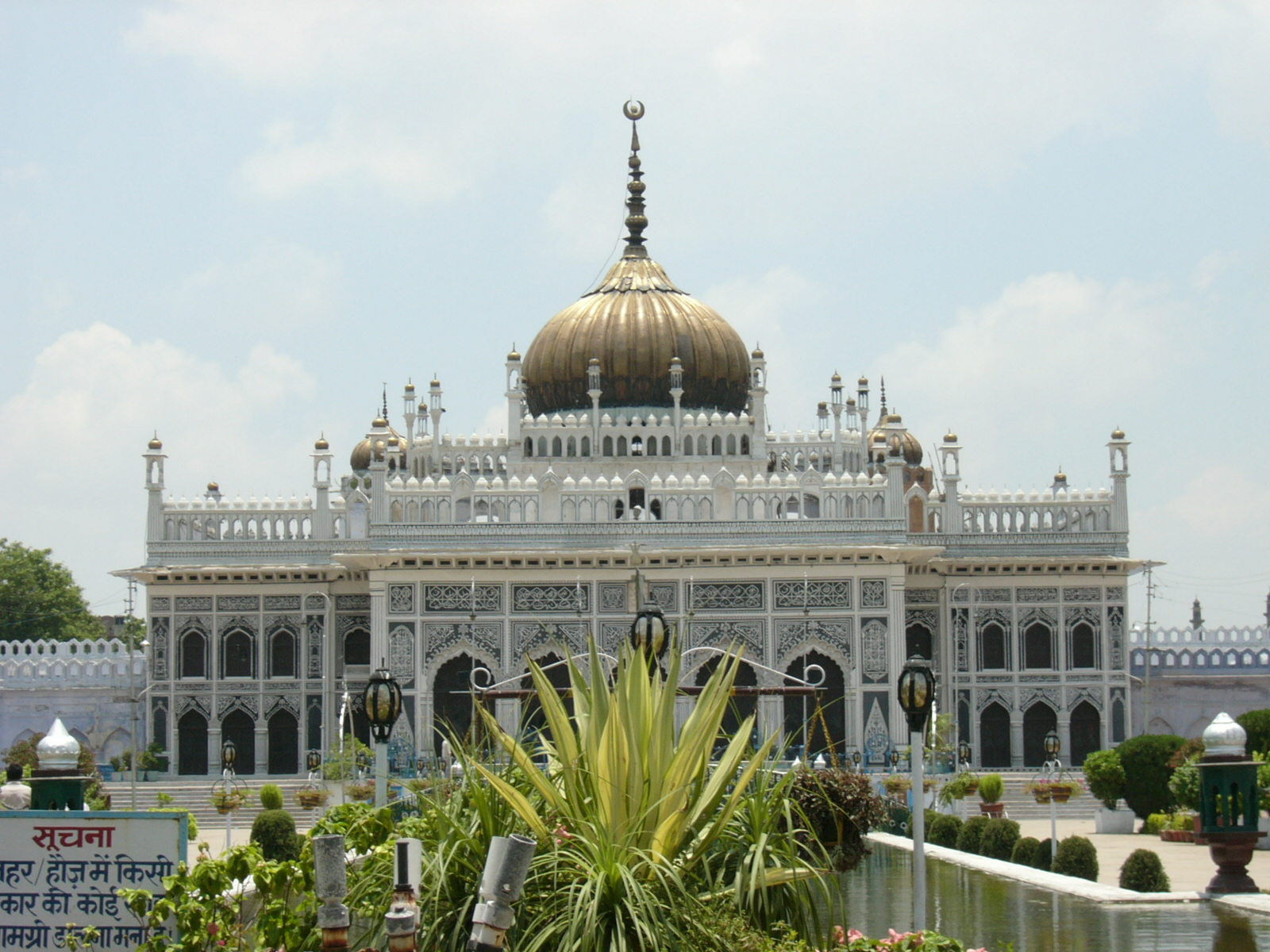
The Chhota Imambara, Lucknow

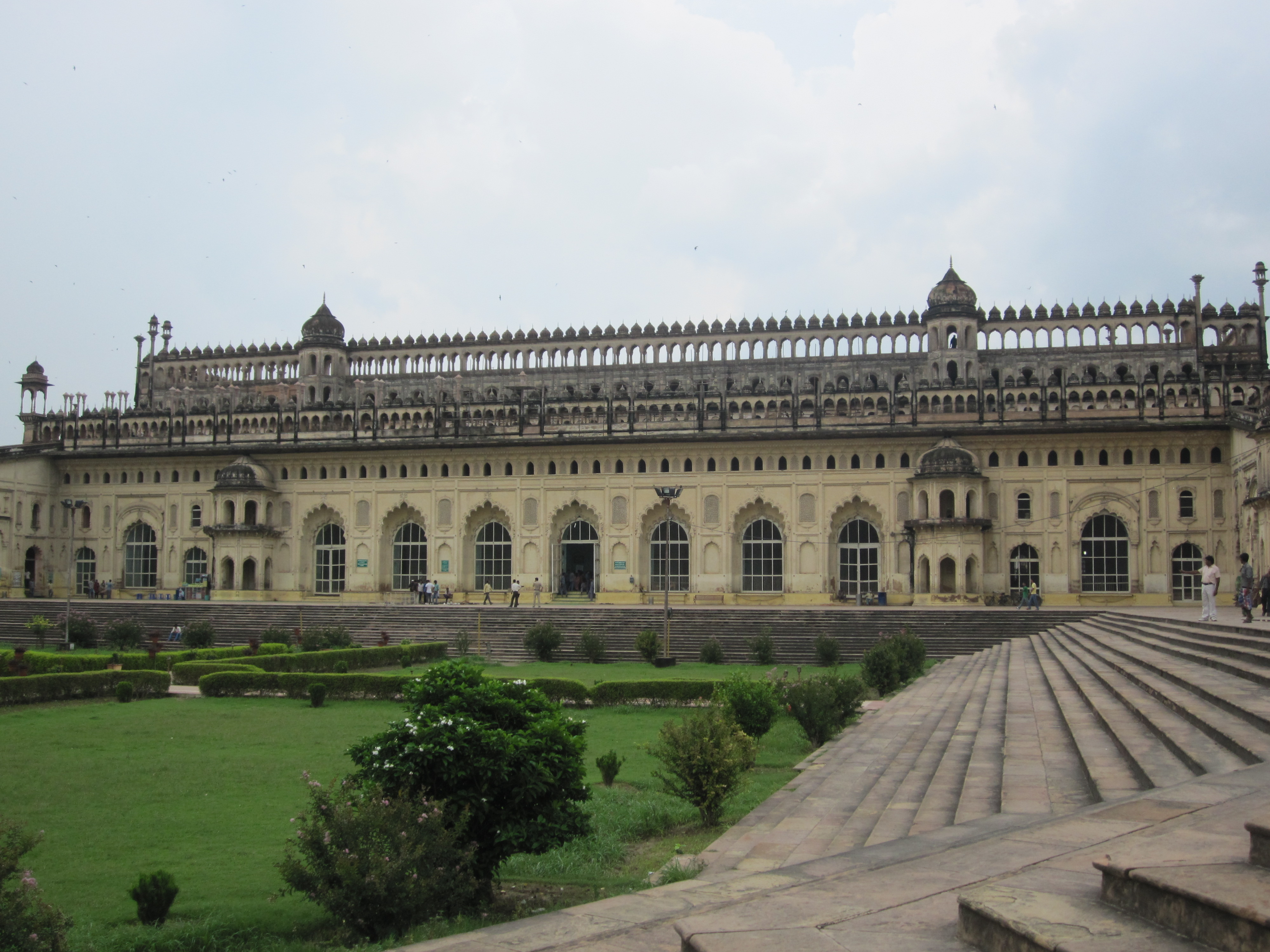
The Bhool Bhulaiyya Front View, Lucknow

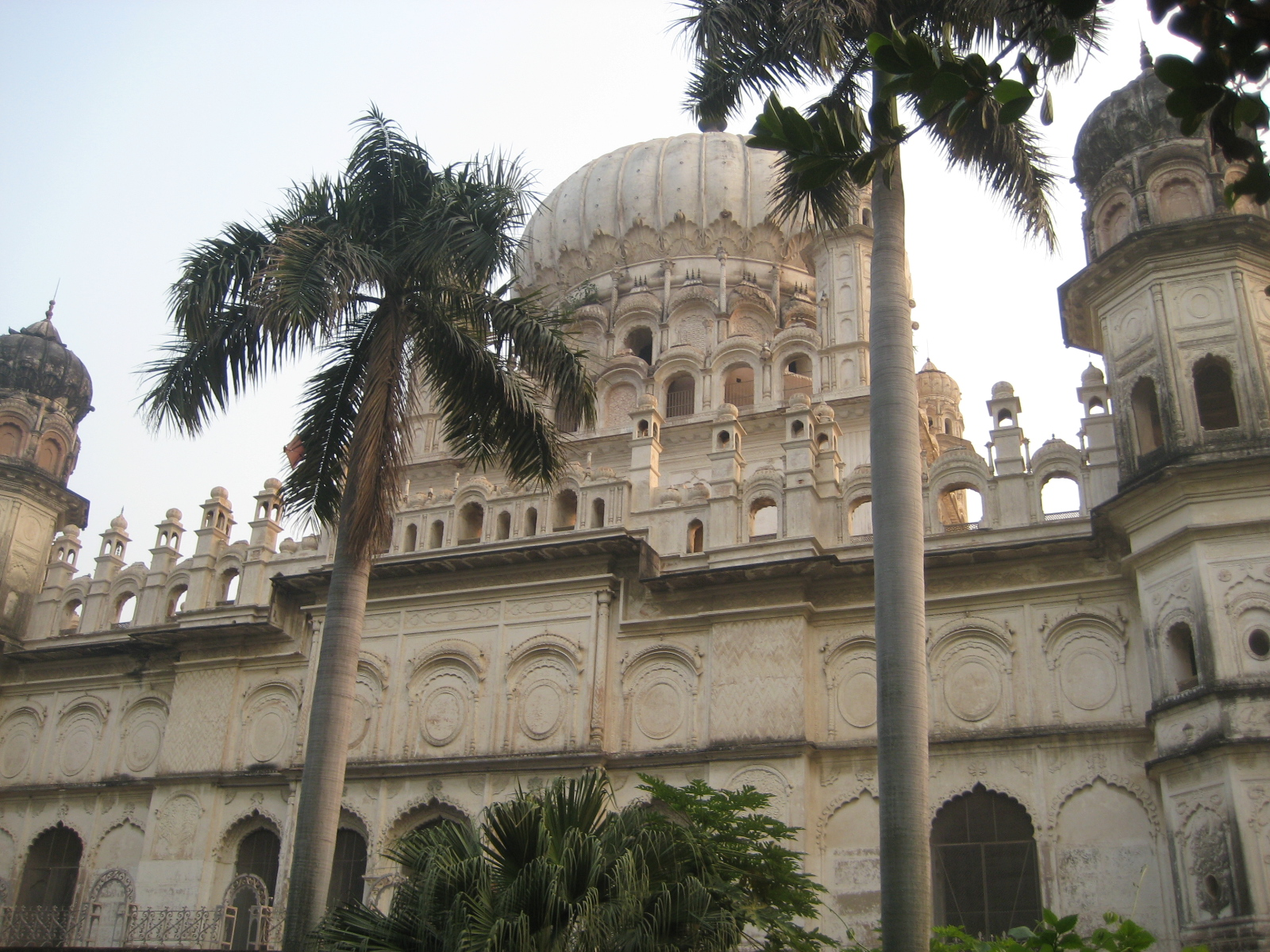
Bahu Begum ka Maqbara, Faizabad.

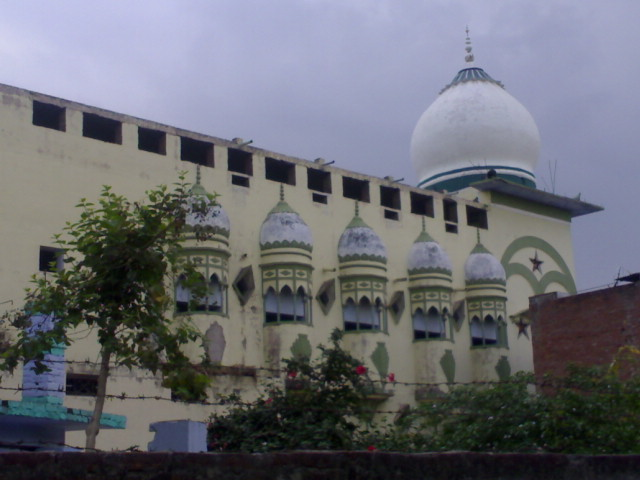
Kakrala is the town where Sufi Shah Sharafat Miyan was born.

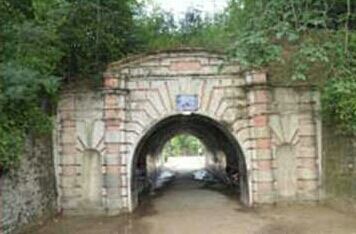
Moat at the Aligarh Fort, Aligarh.
