= Meenakshi Singh =

Indian politician

Member of the Uttar Pradesh Legislative Assembly
- Incumbent
- Assumed office 2022
- Constituency: Khurja

Personal details
- Born: 26 January 1989 (age 37)
- Party: Bharatiya Janata Party

Meenakshi Singh (born 26 January 1989) is an Indian politician from Uttar Pradesh. She is a member of the Uttar Pradesh Legislative Assembly, representing the Khurja Assembly constituency in Bulandshahr district. She is a member of the Bharatiya Janata Party.

== Early life and education ==
Singh is from Khurja, Bulandshahr district, Uttar Pradesh. She married Anubhav Singh. She completed law from M. J. P. Rohilkhand University, Bareilly in 2012, and is a practicing advocate.

== Career ==
Singh won the 2022 Uttar Pradesh Legislative Assembly election from Khurja Assembly Constituency, a seat reserved for SC community in Bulandshahr district, representing Bharatiya Janata Party. She defeated Banshi Singh of Samajvadi Party by a huge margin of 67,084 votes.
