= Shikarpur Assembly constituency =

Constituency of the Uttar Pradesh legislative assembly in India

Shikarpur
- Constituency No. 69 for the Uttar Pradesh Legislative Assembly

Constituency details
- Country: India
- Region: North India
- State: Uttar Pradesh
- District: Bulandshahar
- Total electors: 294,460 (2012)
- Reservation: None

Member of Legislative Assembly
- 18th Uttar Pradesh Legislative Assembly
- Incumbent Vacant
- Elected year: 2022

Shikarpur Assembly constituency is one of the 403 constituencies of the Uttar Pradesh Legislative Assembly, India. It is a part of the Bulandshahar district and one of the five assembly constituencies in the Bulandshahr Lok Sabha constituency. First election in this assembly constituency was held in 1957 after the "DPACO (1956)" (delimitation order) was passed in 1956. After the "Delimitation of Parliamentary and Assembly Constituencies Order" was passed in 2008, the constituency was assigned identification number 69. The constituency was not in existence from 1967 to 1973. In 1957, the constituency had two concurrent MLAs and the seat was reserved (till 2008) for candidates from SC community.

== Wards / Areas ==
Extent of Shikarpur Assembly constituency is Shikarpur Tehsil; PC Katiyawali of Jahangirabad KC of Anupshahr Tehsil.

== Members of the Legislative Assembly ==
#	Term	Name	Party	From	To	Days	Comments	Ref
01	02nd Vidhan Sabha	Badam Singh	Indian National Congress	Apr-1957	Mar-1962	1,800	-	
02	02nd Vidhan Sabha	Rajendra Datt	Indian National Congress	Apr-1957	Mar-1962	1,800	-	
03	03rd Vidhan Sabha	Sugan Chand	Indian National Congress	Mar-1962	Mar-1967	1,828	-	
04	04th Vidhan Sabha	-	-	Mar-1967	Apr-1968	402	Constituency not in existence	
05	05th Vidhan Sabha	-	-	Feb-1969	Mar-1974	1,832	Constituency not in existence	
06	06th Vidhan Sabha	Dharam Singh	Indian National Congress	Mar-1974	Apr-1977	1,153	-	
07	07th Vidhan Sabha	Trilok Chand	Janata Party	Jun-1977	Feb-1980	969	-	
08	08th Vidhan Sabha	Dharam Singh	Indian National Congress (I)	Jun-1980	Mar-1985	1,735	-	
09	09th Vidhan Sabha	Trilok Chand	Lok Dal	Mar-1985	Nov-1989	1,725	-	
10	10th Vidhan Sabha	Ganga Ram	Janata Dal	Dec-1989	Apr-1991	488	-	
11	11th Vidhan Sabha	Ganga Ram	Janata Dal	Jun-1991	Dec-1992	533	-	
12	12th Vidhan Sabha	Ram Prasad	Bharatiya Janata Party	Dec-1993	Oct-1995	693	-	
13	13th Vidhan Sabha	Mahendra Kumar	Bharatiya Janata Party	Oct-1996	May-2002	1,967	-	
14	14th Vidhan Sabha	Munshi Lal Gautam	Bharatiya Janata Party	2002	May 2007	1,902	-	
15	15th Vidhan Sabha	Vasdev Singh	Bahujan Samaj Party	May 2007	March 2012	1,762	-	
16	16th Vidhan Sabha	Mukesh Sharma	Samajwadi Party	March 2012	March 2017	1,829	-	
17	17th Vidhan Sabha	Anil Sharma	Bharatiya Janata Party	March 2017	March 2022	1790		
18	18th Vidhan Sabha	Anil Sharma	Bharatiya Janata Party	March 2022	September 2026	1637	Died on 2 September 2026	

== Election results ==
=== 2027 ===
2027 Uttar Pradesh Legislative Assembly election: Shikarpur
Party	Candidate	Votes	%	±%
INDIA				
NDA				
BSP				
NOTA	None of the above			
Majority				
Turnout				
gain from		Swing		

=== 2022 ===
2022 Uttar Pradesh Legislative Assembly election: Shikarpur
Party	Candidate	Votes	%	±%
BJP	Anil Kumar	113,855	53.04	▲2.78
RLD	Kiranpal Singh	58,172	27.1	▲23.29
BSP	Mohammed Rafiq	37,358	17.4	▼8.08
NOTA	None of the above	1,452	0.68	▼0.37
Majority		55,683	25.94	▲1.16
Turnout		214,653	64.18	▼1.05
BJP hold		Swing		

=== 2017 ===
17th Vidhan Sabha

2017 Assembly Elections: Shikarpur
Party	Candidate	Votes	%	±%
BJP	Anil Sharma	101,912	50.26	
BSP	Mukul Upadhyay	51,667	25.48	
INC	Uday Singh Dalal	32,914	16.23	
RLD	Mukesh Sharma	7,734	3.81	
Independent	Shanti Sharma	2,908	1.43	
NOTA	None of the above	2,115	1.05	
Majority		50,245	24.78	
Turnout		202,785	65.23	
BJP gain from SP		Swing		

=== 2012 ===
2012 Assembly Elections: Shikarpur
Party	Candidate	Votes	%	±%
SP	Mukesh Sharma	64,498	34.98	Steady
BSP	Anil Sharma	56,095	30.43	Steady
RLD	Kiranpal Singh	45,312	24.58	Steady
BJP	Jai Prakash Gupta	9,884	5.36	Steady
Independent	Subhash	3,160	1.71	Steady
PECP	Mukesh	1,092	0.59	Steady
	Remainder 7 Candidates	4,320	2.35	Steady
Majority		8,403	4.55	Steady
Turnout		1,84,361	62.61	Steady
SP gain from BSP		Swing		

== See also ==
- Bulandshahar district
- Bulandshahr Lok Sabha constituency
- Sixteenth Legislative Assembly of Uttar Pradesh
- Uttar Pradesh Legislative Assembly
