= Banshi Singh =

Indian politician (born 1962)

MLA, 16th Legislative Assembly of Uttar Pradesh
- In office March 2012 – March 2017
- Preceded by: Anil Sharma
- Succeeded by: Vijendra Singh
- Constituency: Khurja

Personal details
- Born: 1 February 1962 (age 64) Gautam Budh Nagar district
- Party: Samajwadi Party
- Spouse: Anita Singh (wife)
- Children: 1 son
- Parent: Bihari Singh (father)
- Education: Not available
- Profession: Farmer & politician

Banshi Singh (known as Banshi Singh Pahadiya) is an Indian politician and a member of the 16th Legislative Assembly of India. He represents the Khurja constituency of Uttar Pradesh

== Early life and education ==
Banshi Singh was born in Gautam Budh Nagar district. He is educated till eighth grade. Singh belongs to the Khatik community.

== Political career ==
Banshi Singh has been a MLA for one term. He represented the Khurja constituency and is a member of the Indian National Congress political party.

In 2019, he got Loksabha ticket by Indian National Congress from Bulandashahar (Lok Sabha constituency), he contested against Bhola Singh (Current MP of Bulandashahar). However he lost the election and came in third position with 29,465 votes followed by BJP's Bhola Singh won with 6,81,321 votes and BSP's Yogesh Verma with 3,91,264 votes on the second.

== Posts held ==
#	From	To	Position	Comments
01	March 2012	March 2017	Member, 16th Legislative Assembly	

== See also ==
- Khurja (Assembly constituency)
- Sixteenth Legislative Assembly of Uttar Pradesh
- Uttar Pradesh Legislative Assembly
