= Khurja pottery =

Traditional pottery from Khurja, Uttar Pradesh, India

- Geographical indication
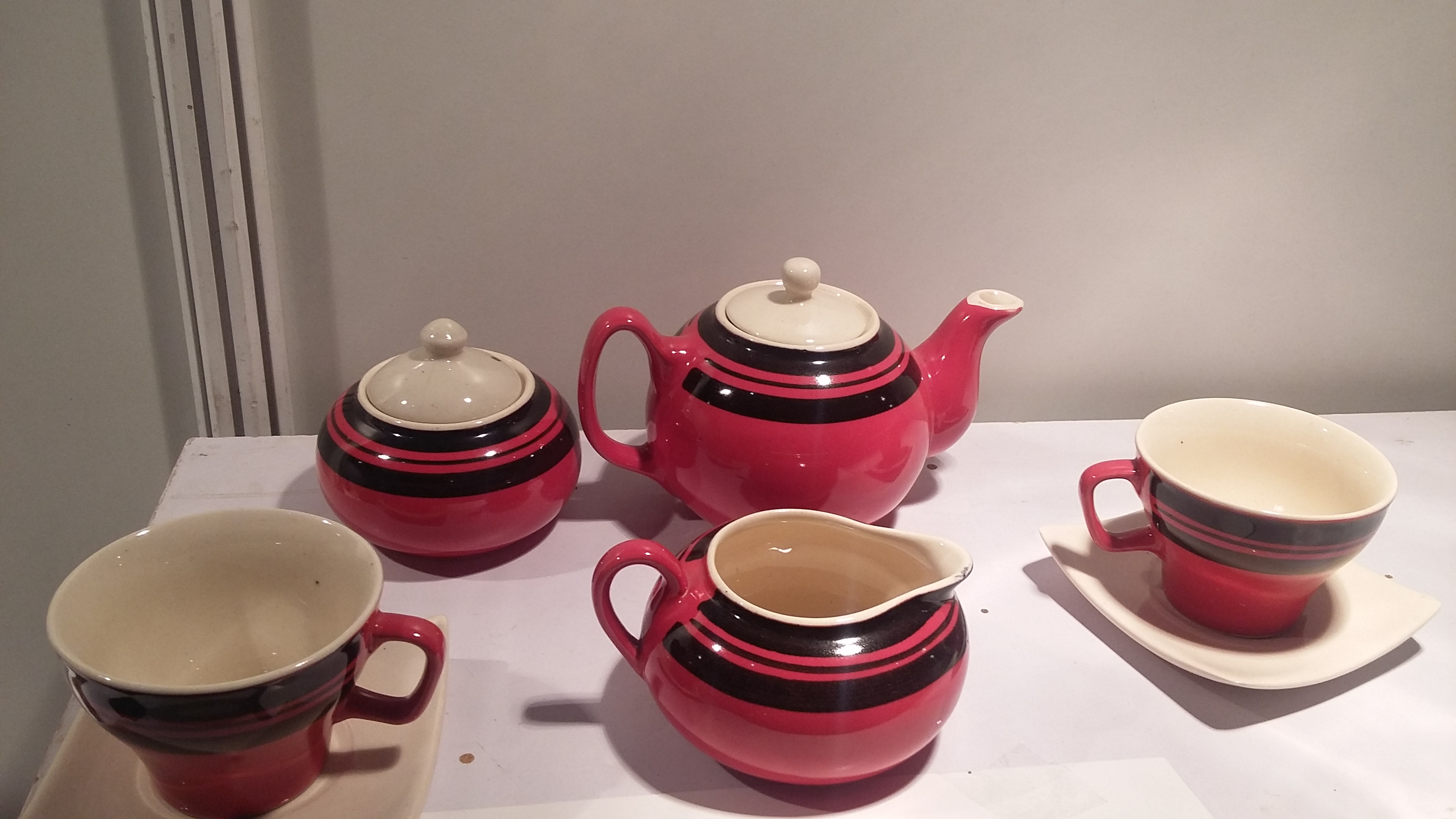
- Type: Handicraft
- Area: Khurja, Bulandshahr, UP
- Country: India
- Registered: 2008–2009
- Material: Clay

Khurja pottery is traditional pottery work manufactured in Khurja of the Bulandshahr district in Uttar Pradesh state, India. Khurja pottery has been protected under the Geographical indication (GI) of the Agreement on Trade-Related Aspects of Intellectual Property Rights (TRIPS) agreement. It is listed at item 178 as "Khurja Pottery" of the GI Act 1999 of the Government of India with registration confirmed by the Controller General of Patents Designs and Trademarks.

== History ==
Khurja was founded in the 1400s by the Kheshgi family, the ruling family of the large Pashtun tribe of the same name. The Kheshgi family was among the many Pashtun families and tribes which settled in the Northwest Region of present day India during the Muslim conquests in the Indian subcontinent.

Origin of Khurja’s pottery work has been said with at least two different stories. In one legend, the Afghan King Timur and his Military of Pashtuns during their Islamic Invasion of Northwest India over 600 years ago accompanied Egyptian and Syrian potters. In another legend, potters had been moved to the region in the 1500s during the era of the Mughal Empire.

Khurja in Bulandshaher is one of the oldest centers for glazed pottery in South Asia. Some potters often call themselves as Multani Kumhars suggesting that their origin was Multan and that they were employed by the Pashtuns who settled in Khurja.

Modern-day pottery manufacture flourished in the 1940s, and the United Provinces government set up a pottery factory in 1942. Later, the factory was closed in 1946–47 due to lack of quality. In 1952, the factory was changed as Pottery Development Centre. From 1942 until now, some adoption, transformation, initiative were taken by various actors for the betterment of pottery manufacture that resulted an importance role of Khurja pottery in national level as well as export to foreign countries.

== Production ==
There are about 15,000 people as official employees while about 25,000 unofficial employees who work in 500-odd units and nearly 400 factories. They produce several kinds of items such as crockery wares, art wares, electrical goods, sanitary wares, tiles, household items, etc.

Khurja pottery has market in India and foreign countries. There are nearly 23 export oriented units. Reports say that production has received around 2,500 million Indian Rupees worth of item in 1999–2000 including 148.2 million Indian Rupees worth of export.

== See also ==
- List of Geographical Indications in India
