= Mukesh Sharma =

Indian politician

Hon'ble Mukesh Sharma

MLA, 16th Legislative Assembly, Uttar Pradesh
- In office Mar 2012 – Mar 2017
- Preceded by: Vasdev Singh
- Succeeded by: Anil Kumar
- Constituency: Shikarpur

Personal details
- Born: 15 June 1981 (age 45) Gautam Budh Nagar district
- Party: Samajwadi Party (2012–2017)(2024-Present) Rashtriya Lok Dal (2017-2022)
- Spouse: Shilpi Shamra (wife)
- Children: 1 son
- Parent: Mishri Lal Sharma (father)
- Education: Not available
- Profession: Businessman & politician

Mukesh Sharma is an Indian politician and a member of the 16th Legislative Assembly in Uttar Pradesh state of India. He represents the Shikarpur constituency of Uttar Pradesh and was a member of the Samajwadi Party political party until 2017.

== Early life and education ==
Sharma was born in Gautam Budh Nagar district. He is educated till twelfth grade (alma mater not known).

== Political career ==
Sharma has been a MLA for one term. He represented the Shikarpur constituency and was a member of the Samajwadi Party political party. Sharma was expelled from the SP along with his brother Bhagwan Sharma for defying the party whip by cross-voting in favor of a Bharatiya Janata Party nominee and attempted to contest with the BJP, but were denied tickets, after which, they joined the Rashtriya Lok Dal.

== Posts held ==
#	From	To	Position	Comments
01	2012	Mar-2017	Member, 16th Legislative Assembly	

== See also ==
- Shikarpur (Assembly constituency)
- Sixteenth Legislative Assembly of Uttar Pradesh
- Uttar Pradesh Legislative Assembly
