= Khurja Assembly constituency =

Constituency of the Uttar Pradesh legislative assembly in India

Khurja
- Constituency No. 70 for the Uttar Pradesh Legislative Assembly

Constituency details
- Country: India
- Region: North India
- State: Uttar Pradesh
- District: Bulandshahr
- Total electors: 326,538 (2012)
- Reservation: SC

Member of Legislative Assembly
- 18th Uttar Pradesh Legislative Assembly
- Incumbent Meenakshi Singh
- Party: Bharatiya Janata Party
- Elected year: March 2022

Khurja is one of the 403 constituencies of the Uttar Pradesh Legislative Assembly, India. It is a part of the Bulandshahr district and one of the five assembly constituencies in the Gautam Buddha Nagar Lok Sabha constituency,. First election in this assembly constituency was held in 1952 after the "DPACO (1951)" (delimitation order) was passed in 1951. After the "Delimitation of Parliamentary and Assembly Constituencies Order" was passed in 2008, the constituency was assigned identification number 70. During the 01st and 02nd legislative assemblies, the constituency had two seats (MLAs) concurrently.

== Wards / Areas ==
Extent of Khurja Assembly constituency is Khurja Tehsil.

== Members of the Legislative Assembly ==
Year	Name	Party
1952	Kishan Swarup Bhatnagar	Indian National Congress
1952	Bhim Sen	Indian National Congress
1957	Chhattar Singh	Independent politician
1957	Gopali	Independent politician
1962	Mahabir Singh	Indian National Congress
1967	Mahabir Singh	Indian National Congress
1969	Chhattar Singh	Bharatiya Kranti Dal
1974	Mahabir Singh	Indian National Congress
1977	Chhattar Singh	Janata Party
1980	Mahabir Singh	Indian National Congress
1985	Mahabir Singh	Indian National Congress
1989	Chhattar Singh	Janata Dal
1991	Mahabir Singh	Independent politician
1993	Chhattar Singh	Bharatiya Janata Party
1996	Chhattar Singh	Bharatiya Janata Party
2002	Vijendra Singh	Bahujan Samaj Party
2007	Vijendra Singh	Bahujan Samaj Party
2012	Banshi Singh	Indian National Congress
2017	Vijendra Singh	Bharatiya Janata Party
2022	Meenakshi Singh	Bharatiya Janata Party

== Election results ==
=== 2027 ===
2027 Uttar Pradesh Legislative Assembly election: Khurja
Party	Candidate	Votes	%	±%
SP	Sakib Petal	TBD	TBD	TBD
NDA	Meenakshi Singh	TBD	TBD	TBD
BSP	Vinod Jatav	TBD	TBD	TBD
NOTA	None of the above	TBD	TBD	TBD
Majority		TBD	TBD	TBD
Turnout		TBD	TBD	TBD
SP gain from BJP		Swing		

=== 2022 ===
2022 Uttar Pradesh Legislative Assembly election: Khurja
Party	Candidate	Votes	%	±%
BJP	Meenakshi Singh	137,461	52.99	▲2.56
SP	Banshi Singh	70,377	27.13	
BSP	Vinod Jatav	45,325	17.47	▼5.82
INC	Tukki Mal Khatik	2,643	1.02	▼21.38
NOTA	None of the above	1,031	0.4	▼0.33
Majority		67,084	25.86	▼1.28
Turnout		259,387	66.64	▲1.14
BJP hold		Swing		

=== 2017 ===
2017 Assembly Elections: Khurja
Party	Candidate	Votes	%	±%
BJP	Vijendra Singh	119,493	50.43	
BSP	Arjun Singh	55,194	23.29	
INC	Banshi Singh	53,084	22.4	
RLD	Manoj Kumar	3,921	1.65	
NOTA	None of the above	1,716	0.73	
Majority		64,299	27.14	
Turnout		236,970	65.5	
BJP gain from INC		Swing		

=== 2012 ===
2012 Assembly Elections: Khurja
Party	Candidate	Votes	%	±%
INC	Banshi Singh	98,913	47.13	Steady
BSP	Horam Singh	61,609	29.36	Steady
BJP	Satish Balmiki	38,181	18.19	Steady
SP	Nand Kishor Balmiki	2,550	1.22	Steady
	Remainder 12 candidates	8,607	4.10	Steady
Majority		37,304	17.78	Steady
Turnout		209,860	64.27	Steady
INC gain from BSP		Swing		

== See also ==
- Bulandshahr Lok Sabha constituency
- Gautam Budh Nagar district
- Sixteenth Legislative Assembly of Uttar Pradesh
- Uttar Pradesh Legislative Assembly
