= Khurja =

- City
- Location in Uttar Pradesh, India
- Coordinates: 28°15′8″N 77°51′6.41″E
- Country: India
- State: Uttar Pradesh
- District: Bulandshahr
- Founded by: Kheshgi Dynasty of the Mughal Empire

Government
  - MLA: Minakshi Singh (BJP)
  - MP: Dr Mahesh Sharma(BJP)

Population (2011)
  - Total: 142,636

Languages
  - Official: Hindi
- Time zone: UTC+5:30 (IST)
- PIN: 203131
- Telephone code: (+91)5738
- Vehicle registration: UP-13

Khurja is a city (and a municipal board) in Bulandshahr district in the Indian state of Uttar Pradesh. It is situated around 20 km from Bulandshahr and 85 km from Delhi. Khurja supplies a large portion of the ceramics used in the country, hence it is sometimes called The Ceramics City. The city is also famous for a special sweet, known as "khurchan".

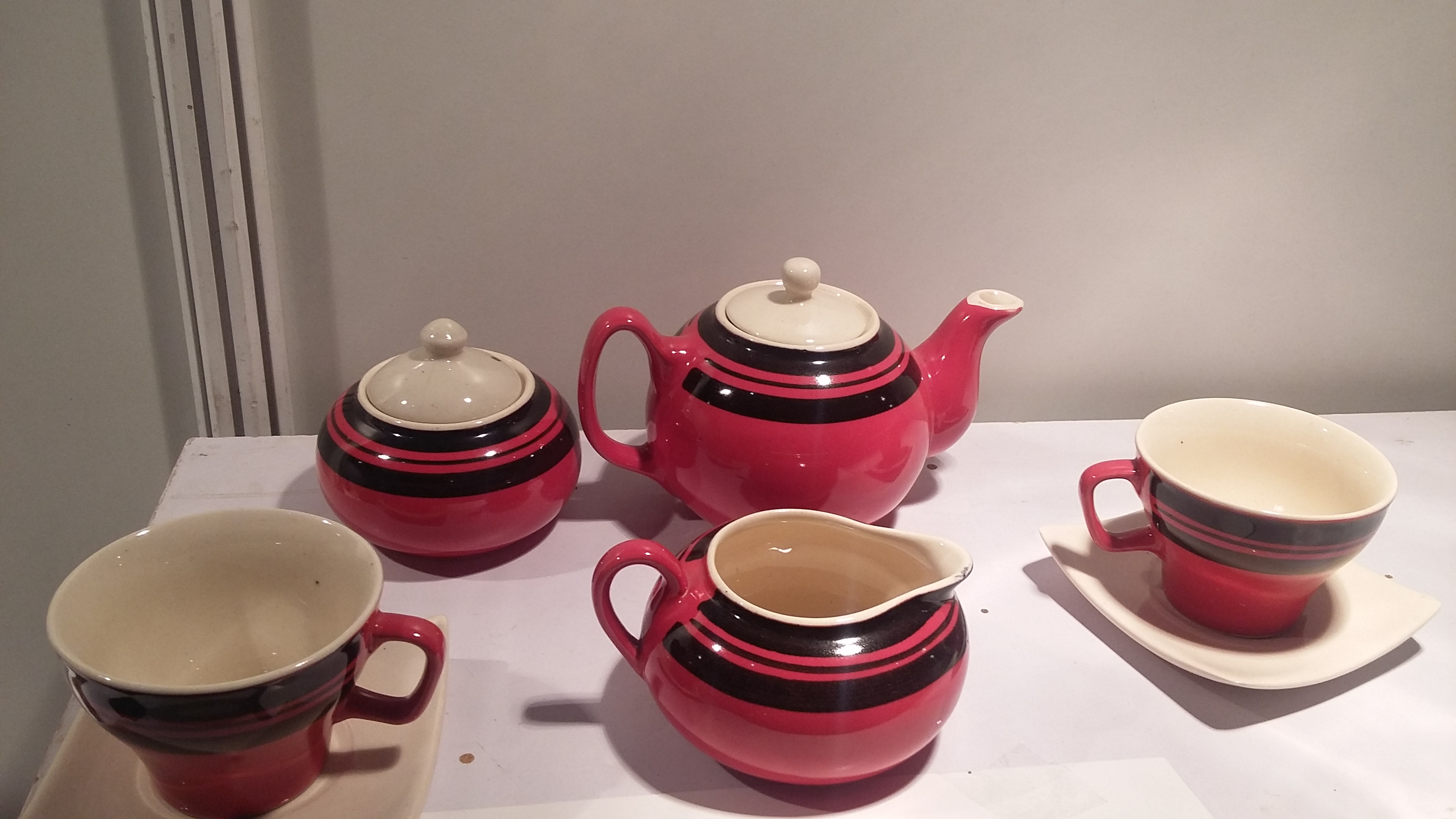
Khurja pottery

The principal inhabitants of Khurja are the Pashtuns, mainly members from the Kheshgi Dynasty of Timur's army.

The name Khurja is derived from the Persian and Urdu word kharja which means foreign.

Khurja is known for ceramics production. With over 500 factories producing ceramic works, its skyline is dotted with chimneys.

== Geography ==
Khurja is located at 28.25°N 77.85°E. It has an average elevation of 197 metres (646 foot).

== Climate ==
Khurja has been ranked 16th best “National Clean Air City” under (Category 3 population under 3 lakhs cities) in India.

== Demographics ==
As per provisional data of the 2011 census, Khurja urban agglomeration had a population of 142,636, out of which males were 75,384 and females were 67,252. The literacy rate was 72%.

Religions in Khurja
Religion	Percent
Hindus	60%
Muslims	38%
Jains	1.0%
Others†	1.0%
Distribution of religions †Includes Sikhs (0.2%), Buddhists (<0.2%).

This compares with the 2001 India census, when Khurja had a population of 98,403. Males constituted 53% of the population and females 47%. Khurja had an average literacy rate of 57%, lower than the national average of 60.5%: male literacy was 65%, and female literacy was 55%. 16% of the population was under 6 years of age.

== Governance and Politics ==
Khurja is administratively governed by a Municipal Council (Nagar Palika), which is responsible for managing civic infrastructure, sanitation, waste management, water supply, and public works. The Nagar Palika is headed by a chairperson, who is elected by the residents of Khurja.

Current Chairperson: Mrs. Anjana Singhal

Khurja is part of the Bulandshahr district and falls under the jurisdiction of the District Magistrate of Bulandshahr for higher administrative oversight. The Sub-Divisional Magistrate (SDM) for Khurja supervises revenue collection and maintains law and order at the local level.

Current SDM: Mr. Durgesh Singh

In Khurja, Durgesh Singh currently serves as both the Sub-Divisional Magistrate (SDM) and the Executive Officer of the Municipal Council.

=== Local Governance and Wards ===
Khurja Municipal Council is divided into 31 wards, each represented by an elected councilor (Sabhasada). These councilors form the Nagar Palika's governing body, focusing on issues specific to their wards, such as road maintenance, waste disposal, and water supply. Elections are held every five years.

=== Legislative Representation ===
Khurja is part of the Khurja Assembly Constituency (Vidhan Sabha), represented in the Uttar Pradesh Legislative Assembly.

Current MLA: Mrs. Meenakshi Singh

Khurja is also a segment of the Gautam Buddha Nagar Lok Sabha constituency for national parliamentary representation.

Current MP: Dr. Mahesh Sharma

== History ==
The history of Khurja pottery goes back to around 14th century, when some retreating (wounded) soldiers and commanders from Timur's army decided to remain. They had officially established Khurja as a town. These men were mainly from the imperial Kheshgi Dynasty of the Mughal Empire, descendants of the Kheshigs, who were senior officials throughout the Empire.

A number of these soldiers were potters and they brought this craft with them. Starting with red clay pottery they moved on to blue glaze and on red clay articles with a white engobe, painted floral designs with cupric oxide and applying a soft glaze containing glass and borax etc.

During World War II, ban was imposed on various metals for making household utensils and import of ceramic goods was drastically curtailed. To meet the demand of ceramic wares mainly for war hospitals, the Government of Uttar Pradesh established a ceramic unit. After the war, the factory was closed in 1946 due to lack of demand of its products. The factory was equipped with three small kilns, two chimneys and three ball mills. Instead of closing the factory completely the Government of Uttar Pradesh converted it into a Pottery Development Centre.

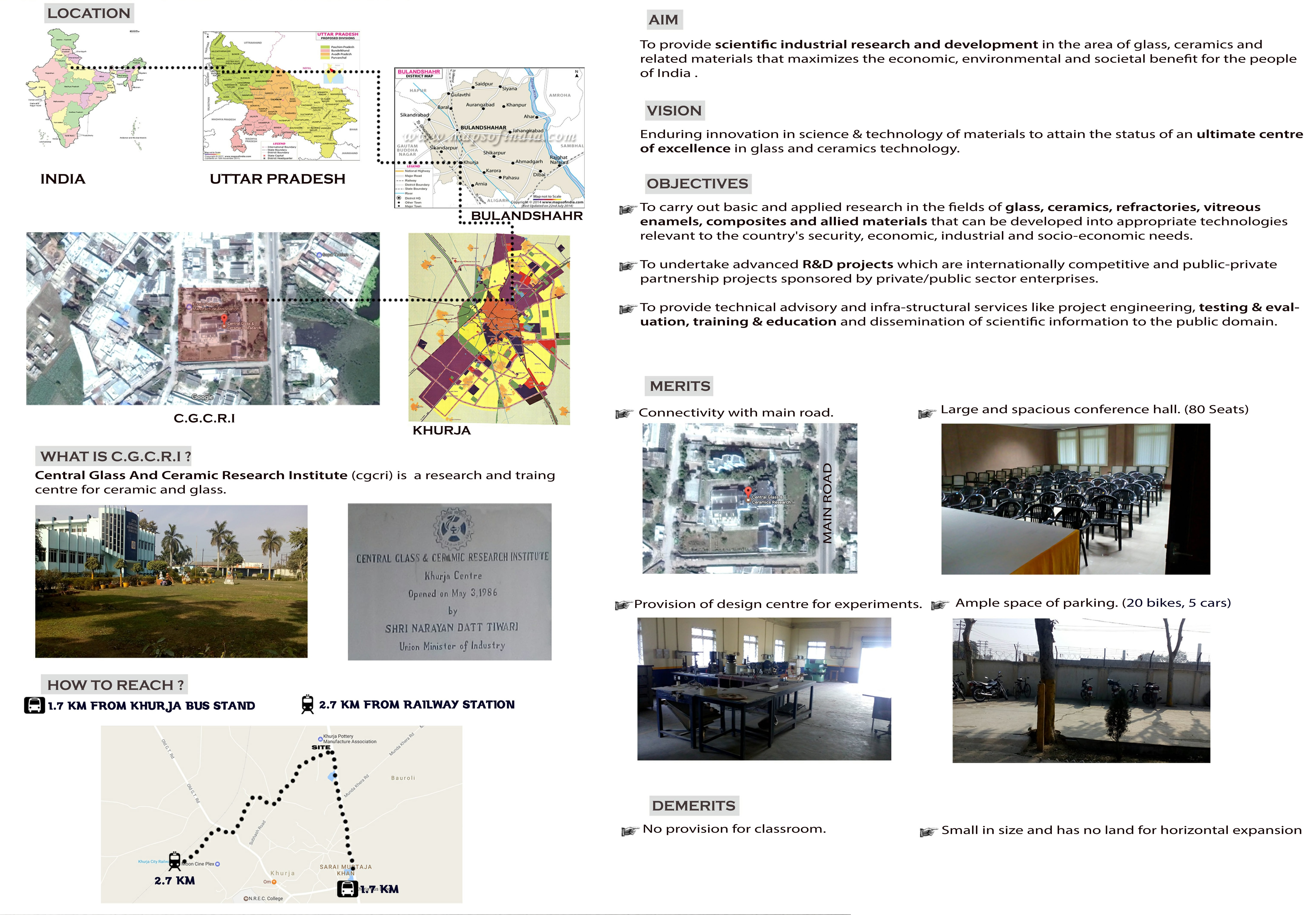

== Industry ==
The development activities of U.P. Small Industrial Corporation Ltd. resulted in setting up of UPSIC Potteries Ltd. in 1976–77. There was a widespread complaint about the efficiency of the UPSIC Potteries Ltd., primarily because of high costs. The Government of Uttar Pradesh set up a panel in Nov.1990 to examine the working of the corporation and to consider the proposal of the passing of the commercial activities back to the Pottery Development Centre (Local Office of Directorate of fisheries.)

Though an industrial region, Khurja lacks the infrastructure for good industry by European standards. Since there are often power cuts lasting around eight hours, all factories and most homes have private generators. The municipality water supply is insufficient or everybody's need so many have water pumps to extract groundwater.

== Markets and fairs ==
Khurja is a small town, with shops open until 21:00 in the Bindawala Chowk and Tareenan. There are many small markets which are important for the residents. Some markets are: Anaj mandi, Bindawala Chawk, Sabzi Mandi (town's biggest and main Vegetable Market), subhash road, Shaheed Dataram marg, Gandhi Road, Raniwala Chawk, Kabadi Bazar (timber and hardware market), Jewar Adda, Moodha-Kheda, Bajaja Bazar (town's biggest textile market), Nayi Basti, Shaheed Dataram Chowk, Bus Adda (Bus Terminus) etc. The city has a cyber market called Sri Ram Complex, near NREC Degree College.

The weekly market called Budh Bazar or The Wednesday Market is popular, There is Sunday(Itwaar Bazar) market also on Navalty Road and the surrounding area is closed to traffic to become a pedestrian zone.

Khurja annually holds a town fair called Ramlila during the festive season of Diwali which goes through the whole festive season and each day of the festival there is theatrical portrayal of the religious stories by various drama groups along with the town's biggest fair, the location of this fair is called the Panchvati which is mainly a group of agricultural farms which is transformed into the fair ground during the season. The second biggest annual fair of Khurja is held during the Hindu festival of Navratri after the establishment of a new temple Nav Durga Shakti Mandir.

== Heritage buildings ==
(Devi mandir) Khurja has a visibly scenic countryside with old buildings and houses along the road. You can find houses more than 100 years old in many parts of the town which are considered as the heritage of the town but now are the victims of negligence. Some of the famous buildings are: Lala Mewaram ka Kamra (the room of Mr. Mewaram, it is taken over by some residents), Seth Gangaram Bhawan (which now has been converted into a banquet hall), the building of J.A.S. Inter college is also a piece of art and Diwan Ji Ka Mandir Near Padam Singh gate. The Temple dates back 100-150 years.

== Khurja Super Thermal Power Project ==
Towards diversification of the company into other energy sectors, THDCIL has entered into a MoU on 31 December 2010 with Govt. of U.P and UPPCL for setting up 2 x 660 MW Super critical Thermal Power Project in Tehsil Khurja, District Bulandshahar, U.P. About 1,200 acres of land was acquired by UPSIDC earlier at Khurja for industrial use which shall be utilized for construction of the project. As per MOU, GoUP / UPPCL will assist in transfer of this land.

== Khurja Logistic Park ==
Khurja is a meeting point of eastern and western dedicated freight rail corridor. Arshiya International Ltd's upcoming FTWZ (Free Trade and Warehousing Zone) in Khurja is strategically located connecting the Western and Eastern freight corridors with the manufacturing hub of India in the NCR. These special zones offer customized warehousing facilities to help add value or store, before organized shipment. As part of a fully integrated infrastructure, Arshiya plans to additionally invest in creating a dedicated Rail Terminal with the FTWZ in Khurja that would allow pan-India connections for its customers through its Rail Infrastructure service.

== Transport ==
Khurja being a significant town is linked by rail on the Delhi – Calcutta line and via the old GT Road to many major cities in India. There are two train stations, Khurja Junction which is on the main Delhi – Kolkata line and Khurja City which serves to district headquarter Bulandshahr & Meerut.

Khurja can be reached by road or train. A drive from Delhi on a direct route has heavy traffic and takes about two and a half hours. Time can be saved by taking the expressway from Delhi to Noida, then the Dankaur station road to Sikandrabad, which is 37 km from Khurja.

Khurja has three bus terminals: Bus Adda; which is the main bus terminus, Jewar Adda; the second terminus and Pahansu Adda; the third terminus. The latter 2 terminals are named after their locations and the routes of buses which they provide. Apart from these Bus terminals, this town has two railways stations one of which is the Khurja Junction (the main station linking Khurja with the major routes of the country) and the other is called Khurja City(a station established for most of the local routes to take off the rail traffic from the main junction).

== Notable people ==
- Swami Avdheshanand Giri, Indian Hindu spiritual guru
- Ashok Chakradhar, Hindi writer and poet
