= Uneven Justice =

2021 memoir by Raj Rajaratnam

Uneven Justice: The Plot to Sink Galleon
- Hardcover edition
- Author: Raj Rajaratnam
- Language: English
- Subject: Autobiography
- Genre: Non-fiction
- Publisher: Post Hill Press
- Publication date: December 14, 2021
- Publication place: United States
- Media type: Print, e-book, audiobook
- Pages: 336 pp.
- ISBN: 978-1637582817

Uneven Justice: The Plot to Sink Galleon is a memoir by Raj Rajaratnam, founder of the Galleon Group, a New York-based hedge fund management firm now ceased in operation; the book was first published in December, 2021 by Post Hill Press.

Raj Rajaratnam is seen during the release of the Tamil version of the book Uneven Justice with Jaffna Teaching Hospital Director Dr. Thangamuthu Sathiyamoorthy (right) and Fintech Association of Sri Lanka President Rajkumar Kanagasingam (left) on January 20, 2024 at the Hoover Auditorium, Faculty of Medicine, University of Jaffna.

== Background ==
Raj Rajaratnam served seven and half years in prison of an 11-year sentence after being convicted for insider trading and was released in the summer of 2019.

In 2021, he published his memoir, Uneven Justice: The Plot to Sink Galleon, detailing the events surrounding his insider trading conviction and the prosecutorial overreach he claims led to it.

Uneven Justice tries to shine a light on the US criminal justice system of which the author is critical and knew little until the FBI knocked on his door with guns and placing him under arrest.

In his preface to the book, Rajaratnam says:

“Empirical studies have shown that the trial penalty is just about double that handed to those who plead guilty. If a defendant agrees to become a cooperating witness, helping the government with testimony – irrespective of the truth – to convict another defendant, the co-operating witnesses gets a much reduced-sentence and in many cases just parole,”

In a 2014 interview with Frontline, sentencing judge Richard Holwell acknowledged concerns over aspects of the government's wiretap application, stating that prosecutors had not provided the complete background to the judge who approved the wiretap. Holwell, however, declined to suppress the evidence, concluding that the wiretaps would still have been authorized and were important to establishing the scope of the insider trading case.

== Review ==
In a review, Glenn Greenwald, Pulitzer Prize winning journalist and former constitutional lawyer, wrote:

“The book, Uneven Justice, makes a persuasive case that this prosecution served to cover up the embarrassment of the Obama DOJ's malfeasance and advance the ambitious Bharara's career. But its most important point is that the entire justice system is rigged against defendants.

Obviously, few people are going to sympathize with a billionaire hedge fund manager. But that's the point. That's not the book's goal. His case is done. The book is a genuine, serious, in-depth study of all the ways federal prosecutors have unchecked power to destroy people.

Federal prosecutors routinely threaten people's families, conceal exculpatory evidence, exploit the fact that almost anything is a crime, and in general have rigged the system to make acquittal almost impossible. If it takes Rajaratnam to help expose that, this book is welcomed.”

Financial and legal commentators also framed Uneven Justice within the broader political and regulatory climate that followed the 2008 financial crisis. In a 2021 Forbes column, contributor John Tamny argued that heightened public anger toward Wall Street after the crisis created pressure for high-profile prosecutions of financial executives, and that Rajaratnam’s case became a symbolic example of this environment. Financial media likewise noted that the Galleon investigation and Rajaratnam’s prosecution occurred during a wider post-crisis crackdown on hedge funds and Wall Street by U.S. authorities.

In a 2014 interview with Frontline, sentencing judge Richard Holwell also described insider trading cases as comparatively easier for prosecutors to pursue than more complex financial misconduct cases, noting that investigations involving sophisticated financial products connected to the 2008 financial crisis presented greater challenges for establishing criminal liability.
