= Rajaratnam =

Rajaratnam ராஜரத்தினம் இராசரத்தினம்
- Pronunciation: /ɾɑːʥəɾət̪nəm/
- Gender: Male
- Language: Tamil; Kannada

Origin
- Meaning: Royal gem
- Region of origin: Southern India; North-eastern Sri Lanka

Other names
- Alternative spelling: Rajarathnam; Rajarathinam

Rajaratnam (Tamil: ராஜரத்தினம், romanized: Rājarattiṉam; Kannada: ರಾಜರತ್ನಂ) is a South Indian and Sri Lankan male given name. Due to the South Indian tradition of using patronymic surnames it may also be a surname for males and females.

== Notable people ==
=== Given name ===
- D. Rajarathinam, Indian politician
- F. M. Rajarathnam, Indian politician
- G. P. Rajarathnam (1909–1979), Indian writer and poet
- J. M. Rajaratnam (1927–2014), Sri Lankan accountant and corporate executive
- S. Rajaratnam (1884–1970), Ceylonese lawyer and politician
- S. Rajaratnam (1915–2006), Singaporean politician
- T. N. Rajarathinam Pillai (1898–1956), Indian musician

=== Surname ===
- Raj Rajaratnam (born 1957), American banker convicted of insider trading
- Rajaratnam Kumaravadivel, Sri Lankan physicist and academic
- Rengan Rajaratnam (born 1971), American banker
- T. W. Rajaratnam (1920–1994), Sri Lankan lawyer, judge and politician
- Thenmozhi Rajaratnam (died 1991), assassin
- Brian Rajaratnam (born 1991), American audio engineer
