= David Palecek =

American management consultant

David Vaclav Palecek
- Born: August 8, 1972; Richmond, Virginia, US
- Died: February 16, 2010 (aged 37); Stanford, California, US
- Education: Stanford Graduate School of Business; University of California, Davis; Menlo-Atherton High School
- Occupation: Consultant
- Employer: McKinsey & Company, Inc.
- Title: Junior Partner
- Spouse: Melissa Black
- Children: 4

David Vaclav Palecek (August 8, 1972 – February 16, 2010) was a junior partner at management consultancy McKinsey & Company and a protégé of Anil Kumar accused in the related Galleon Group insider trading cases with Kumar and former classmate Rengan Rajaratnam of leaking inside information about semiconductor company AMD while head of the semiconductor practice at McKinsey. He graduated with a BS from UC Davis and an MBA from the Stanford Graduate School of Business. He died in 2010 from complications of a staphylococcus infection.

== Career ==
Palecek was born in Virginia and grew up in the wealthy suburb of Atherton, California. He graduated from Menlo-Atherton High School, UC Davis, and the Stanford Graduate School of Business before working at McKinsey and Company in the Palo Alto office, where he rose to junior partner and head of the semiconductor practice. Palecek was described by colleagues as a likely candidate for eventual promotion to senior partner before dying from a staphylococcus infection in 2010.

== Galleon Group implications ==
Palecek was a protégé of senior partner Anil Kumar and the business school classmate of Rengan Rajaratnam, a portfolio manager at the Galleon Group hedge fund and the younger brother of its owner Raj Rajaratnam. Trial testimony revealed Palecek telling Rengan that "my best ideas are inside information." Rengan Rajaratnam also described Palecek as "dirty" and tried to hire Palecek's wife as a consultant to Galleon. His family's lawyer has denied all involvement. Raj Rajaratnam is currently serving a 14-year sentence for securities fraud; Kumar pleaded guilty and was sentenced to probation; Rengan Rajaratnam was arrested by the FBI in March 2013 but was acquitted in 2014 after being found not guilty at trial.

As the third McKinsey partner—in addition to former mentor Kumar and Kumar's mentor (and former McKinsey CEO) Rajat Gupta — implicated in the criminal investigation of the Galleon Group, Palecek's involvement prompted media speculation and pressure as to McKinsey's wider role in the investigation.
