= Palecek =

Palecek is a surname. Notable people with the surname include:

- David Palecek (1972–2010), American management consultant
- Emil Paleček (1930–2018), Czech biochemist
- Ivan Paleček (1868–1945), Croatian and Yugoslav politician
- Jeremiah Palecek (born 1984), American artist
- Josef Paleček (born 1949), Czech ice hockey player and coach
