= SEC v. Rajaratnam =

American legal case

- Court: United States Court of Appeals for the Second Circuit
- Full case name: Securities and Exchange Commission v. Raj Rajaratnam, Danielle Chiesi, Galleon Management, LP, Ali Hariri, Ali T. Far, Anil Kumar, Choo-Beng Lee, David Plate, Deep Shah, Far & Lee LLC, Gautham Shankar, Mark Kurland, New Castle Funds LLC, Rajiv Goel, Robert Moffat, Roomy Khan, S2 Capital Management, LP, Schottenfeld Group LLC, Spherix Capital LLC, Steven Fortuna, Zvi Goffer
- Decided: September 29, 2010
- Citation: 622 F.3d 159

Court membership
- Judges sitting: Raggi, Lynch, and Chin, Circuit Judges

Case opinions
- The court held that while an order to compel the disclosure of wiretap communications is lawful, the district court exceeded its discretion in the current case because it failed to determine the legality of the wiretaps before issuing the order, and did not limit the disclosure to only relevant conversations.

SEC v. Rajaratnam, 622 F.3d 159 (2d Cir. 2010), is a United States Court of Appeals for the Second Circuit case in which defendants Raj Rajaratnam and Danielle Chiesi appealed a discovery order issued by a district court during a civil trial against them for insider trading filed by the Securities and Exchange Commission (SEC). The district court compelled the defendants to disclose to the SEC the contents of thousands of wiretapped conversations that were originally obtained by the United States Attorney's Office (USAO) and were turned over to the defendants during a separate criminal trial.

The Second Circuit court held that although it is lawful to order such a disclosure, and the SEC indeed had a right to access the conversations in preparation for the civil trial, the district court exceeded its discretion by failing to limit the disclosure to conversations relevant to the current case. Citing the significant privacy implications of such a disclosure, the Second Circuit court granted a writ to vacate the discovery order, and remanded the case back to the district court.

== Background ==
On October 16, 2009, the defendants (Rajaratnam and Chiesi) were arrested and indicted for insider trading and conspiracy. The charges stemmed from an investigation by the United States Attorney's Office into allegations that Rajaratnam and Chiesi conspired in insider trading of stock for several large companies. Rajaratnam was found guilty on all 14 charges and sentenced to 11 years in prison. Chiesi was sentenced to 30 months in prison with 2 years of supervised release.

During the discovery phase of the criminal trial, the USAO turned over to the defendants the contents of 18,150 wiretapped communications involving 550 different people, which were recorded over the course of sixteen months from ten telephones, including home, office and mobile lines belonging to the defendants.

=== Civil case ===
On the same day the USAO filed criminal charges against the defendants, the Securities and Exchange Commission filed a civil case against them based on the same allegations, claiming that the defendants engaged in "widespread and repeated insider trading" at several hedge funds, including the now-defunct Galleon Group, during which time they received tips from insiders regarding "market moving events such as quarterly earnings announcements, takeovers, and material contracts" and allegedly used that information to earn over $25 million in illegal profits.

The SEC was not given the contents of the wiretaps, since the USAO had no legal right to share them. The SEC instead attempted to obtain the wiretap contents by ordering the defendants, who had obtained a copy during the criminal trial, to turn them over during discovery in the civil case. The defendants objected, claiming that such disclosure was prohibited by Title III of the Omnibus Crime Control and Safe Streets Act of 1968 (18 U.S.C. §§ 2510–2522), which governs the authorization of wiretaps and provides limits on how and under what conditions the contents of wiretaps can be shared and disclosed. The district court dismissed the objection, noting that the defendants had already shared the wiretap contents with other defendants as part of a joint defense agreement. The district court ordered the defendants to disclose the wiretapped conversations to the SEC, declaring that "the notion that only one party to a litigation should have access to some of the most important non-privileged evidence bearing directly on the case runs counter to basic principles of civil discovery in an adversary system". The defendants appealed this order to the Second Circuit court.

=== Appeal of disclosure order ===
In their objection to the discovery order, the defendants argued that Title III of the Omnibus Crime Control and Safe Streets Act of 1968 forbids implicitly (i.e., because it does not explicitly permit) forced disclosure of wiretap materials during discovery phase in civil cases when the wiretap materials were obtained from separate criminal cases. They additionally claimed that the wiretaps were illegal since Title III does not specifically authorize wiretaps for investigations into insider trading or securities fraud. The defendants also argued that the SEC did not constitute an "aggrieved person" for the purposes of demonstrating "good cause" for disclosure of the fruits of wiretapping, as required by Title III. Finally, they argued that even if the SEC had good cause to obtain the wiretap contents, Title III still prohibited the disclosure, since it prohibited the USAO from providing the wiretap contents directly to the SEC (a contention that neither the USAO nor SEC disputed) and this, in turn, implicitly barred the SEC from obtaining the wiretap contents from the defendants. The SEC argued that they had a right to access the materials and, pursuant to United States v. Miller, the discovery order could be remedied by the defendants on appeal.

== Appeals court ruling ==
The Second Circuit court ruled on four separate issues: whether they had appellate jurisdiction to review the district court's order, whether a writ of mandamus was appropriate to vacate the order, whether Title III of the Omnibus Crime Control and Safe Streets Act of 1968 prohibits discovery orders in civil trials (in general), and whether the district court exceeded its discretion in issuing the order in this particular instance.

=== Interlocutory jurisdiction ===
The court concluded that they lacked jurisdiction to hear an appeal of the discovery order issued by the district court. This decision was based on an interpretation of a prior ruling by the same court in In re City of New York, during which the court ruled that they lacked interlocutory jurisdiction to review any orders "allegedly adverse to a claim of privilege or privacy" and that, despite the disagreement between the parties about how to categorize the discovery order being challenged, it did not fit in the category of claims that the Supreme Court has previously ruled are subject to interlocutory orders—prejudgement orders that are "collateral to the merits of an action" and "too important to be denied immediate review".

=== Writ of mandamus ===
The court noted that even though they lacked interlocutory jurisdiction to review the discovery order, a writ of mandamus was still appropriate to prevent the disclosure because of the privacy issues at stake. The court disagreed with the SEC's interpretation of the United States v. Miller ruling, citing the fact that in the present case, the privacy rights of hundreds of innocent individuals was at risk if the wiretaps were forced to be disclosed—in contrast to United States v. Miller, where the tapes had already been played at trial and consequently, the only issue at stake was the protection against unlawful interception. The court noted that in the present case, "the cat is not yet out of the bag" and a writ was appropriate if the disclosure order was deemed erroneous, since no alternative remedies would be available to the defendants (in particular, an appeal of the ruling after the case would not adequately vindicate the privacy violations). The court explicitly limited the scope of their finding to the present facts, noting that the ruling "does not mean that a writ of mandamus will always be appropriate to remedy an erroneous disclosure order".

=== Title III provisions ===
The court rejected the defendants' claim that Title III forbids the forced disclosure of wiretapped communications, concluding that such disclosure is permitted "where the defendants have received those conversations lawfully". In response to the argument that Title III provides no explicit provision for disclosures under the present facts, the court noted that "[Title III] does not prohibit all that it does not permit". Regarding the defendants' claim that the order is indirectly prohibited, the court determined that "Title III does not prohibit the disclosure of wiretap materials in a situation such as this one: where the government has previously disclosed the contents of wiretaps to a party, and a civil enforcement agency seeks access to those contents from that party, not from the government". The court cautioned that although it determined that such a disclosure, in general, is not unlawful based on Title III, this did not imply that the discovery order in the current case was legal.

=== District court order ===
The court noted that in issuing the discovery order, the district court was obliged to determine both whether the SEC had a right to access the wiretap contents, and whether that right outweighed the privacy implications of such a disclosure. They found that while the district court was correct in determining that the SEC had a right to the materials, it was incorrect in its determination that this right outweighed the privacy implications—especially since the district court did not first ascertain the legality of the wiretaps or limit the discovery order to conversations relevant to the current case. The court cited a previous Supreme Court ruling in Gelbard v. United States that "although Title III authorizes invasions of individual privacy under certain circumstances, the protection of privacy [is] an overriding congressional concern".

The Second Circuit court felt that the district court had an obligation to wait until a court had ruled on the legality of the wiretaps before issuing the discovery order. They also felt that even if the wiretaps were determined to be legal, the irrelevant conversations from the wiretap did not fit within the scope of fair pre-trial discovery since they would not benefit the SEC in the civil case. Consequently, the Second Circuit court ruled that the district court "clearly exceeded its discretion" in ordering the discovery; owing to their decision that a writ of mandamus was the only effective remedy for such a circumstance, they granted a writ to vacate the discovery order and remanded the case back to the district court for further proceedings consistent with their decision.

== See also ==
- Civil discovery under United States federal law
- Bartnicki v. Vopper
