= Preet Bharara =

American attorney and prosecutor (born 1968)

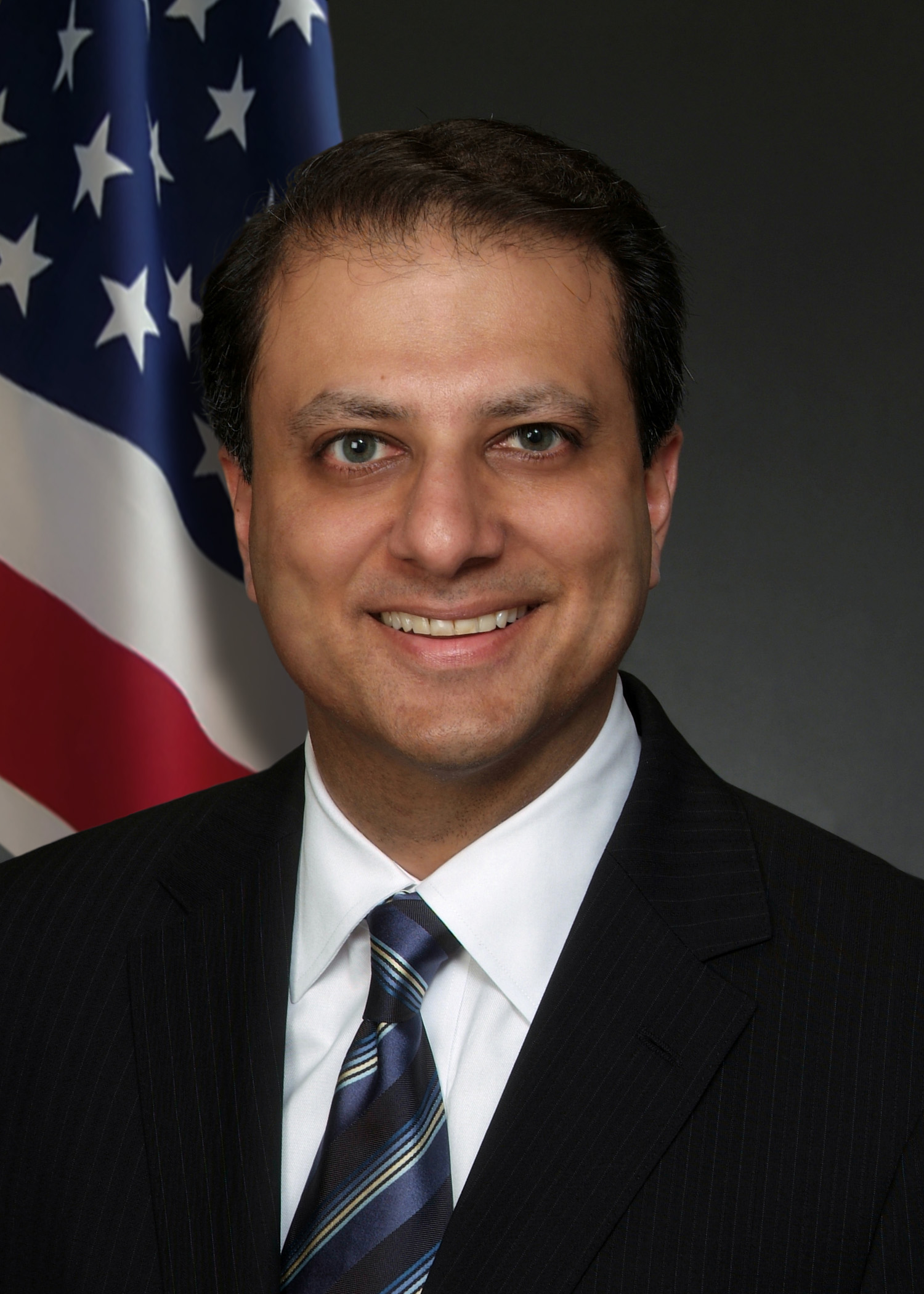
- Official portrait, 2009

United States Attorney for the Southern District of New York
- In office August 13, 2009 – March 11, 2017
- President: Barack Obama; Donald Trump
- Preceded by: Michael J. Garcia
- Succeeded by: Joon Kim (acting)

Personal details
- Born: Preetinder Singh Bharara; October 13, 1968 (age 58) Firozpur, Punjab, India
- Party: Democratic
- Spouse: Dalya Bharara
- Children: 3
- Education: Harvard University (BA); Columbia University (JD)
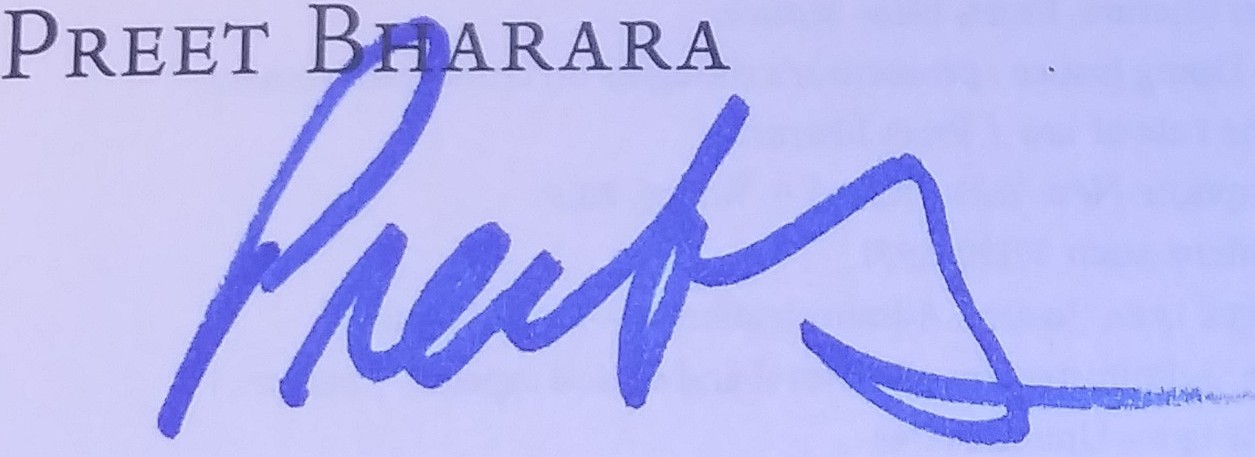
- Signature

Preetinder Singh Bharara (/priːt bəˈrɑːrə/; born October 13, 1968) is an Indian-born American attorney and former federal prosecutor who served as the U.S. attorney for the Southern District of New York from 2009 to 2017. As of 2025, he is a partner at the law firm WilmerHale.

A graduate of Harvard College and Columbia Law School, Bharara worked as an attorney in private practice during his early career. From 2000 to 2005, he served as an assistant U.S. attorney. Bharara then worked as chief counsel to Senator Chuck Schumer from 2005 to 2009; during this time, Bharara was heavily involved in Schumer's investigation of the 2006 presidential dismissal of U.S. attorneys.

In 2009, Bharara was appointed by President Barack Obama to the position of U.S. attorney for the Southern District of New York. His office prosecuted the Italian mafia, convicting four out of the Five Families. Bharara similarly headed various counter-terrorism probes and cases, particularly against Al-Qaeda. His office used a variety of unconventional tactics such as wiretapping and asset seizure; he prosecuted nearly 100 Wall Street executives for insider trading and securities fraud using these legal methods. Bharara closed settlements with the four largest banks in the country and shut down multiple hedge funds. Known for his technocratic approach to prosecution, he convicted a number of Democratic and Republican politicians on public corruption charges. Bharara occasionally pursued criminals extraterritorially. Following a 2013 Russian money laundering investigation, Russian officials permanently banned him from entering Russia. The prosecution of Indian diplomat Devyani Khobragade by his office in 2013 led to a strain in India–United States relations. On March 11, 2017, during the administration of President Donald Trump, Bharara was dismissed after refusing to submit his resignation.

== Early life, education, and early career ==
Bharara was born in 1968 in Firozpur, Punjab, India to a Sikh father and a Hindu mother. He and his parents immigrated to the United States in 1970. Bharara became a U.S. citizen at age 12. He grew up in Eatontown in suburban Monmouth County, New Jersey and attended Ranney School in Tinton Falls, New Jersey, where he graduated as valedictorian in 1986.

Bharara received a Bachelor of Arts degree magna cum laude from Harvard College in 1990. He then received a Juris Doctor degree from Columbia Law School in 1993, where he was a member of the Columbia Law Review.

In 1993, Bharara joined the law firm of Gibson, Dunn & Crutcher as a litigation associate. In 1996, Bharara joined the firm of Shereff, Friedman, Hoffman & Goodman, where he did white-collar defense work. He was an assistant United States Attorney in Manhattan for five years, from 2000 to 2005, bringing criminal cases against the bosses of the Gambino crime family, Colombo crime family, and Asian gangs in New York City. From 2005 to 2009, Bharara served as chief counsel to Senator Chuck Schumer and played a leading role in the United States Senate Committee on the Judiciary investigation into the firings of United States attorneys.

== U.S. Attorney for the Southern District of New York ==
Bharara was nominated to become U.S. Attorney for the Southern District of New York by President Barack Obama on May 15, 2009, and unanimously confirmed by the U.S. Senate. His nomination to the post was welcomed across the political spectrum, as he was regarded as an "apolitical and fair-minded" figure. Bharara was sworn in as U.S. Attorney on August 13, 2009.

During his time as U.S. Attorney, Bharara was named India Abroad's 2011 Person of the Year. In 2012, he was named as one of "The 100 Most Influential People in the World" by Time. Bharara was also included in Bloomberg Markets Magazine's 2012 "50 Most Influential" list as well as Vanity Fair's 2012 and 2013 annual "New Establishment" lists.

=== International investigations ===
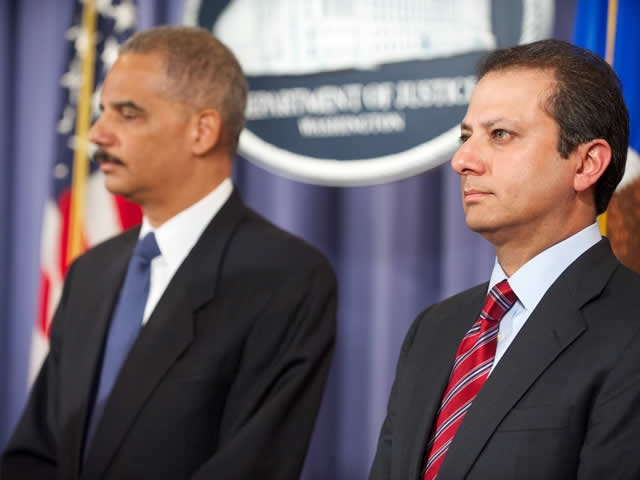
Bharara (right) waits with Attorney General Eric Holder to announce charges related to the 2011 alleged Iran assassination plot

Bharara's office sent out agents to more than 25 countries to investigate suspects of arms and narcotics trafficking and terrorists, and to bring them to Manhattan to face charges. One case involved Viktor Bout. Bout was an arms trafficker, who lived in Moscow and had a deal involving selling arms to Colombian terrorists. Bharara argued that this aggressive approach was necessary in post 9/11 era. Defense lawyers criticized the stings, calling Bharara's office "the Southern District of the World". They also argued that American citizens would not appreciate being treated similarly by other countries.

=== Actions against financial crime ===
==== Insider trading ====
In 2012, Bharara was featured on a cover of Time magazine entitled "This Man is Busting Wall Street" for his office's prosecutions of insider trading and other financial fraud on Wall Street. From 2009 to 2012 (and ongoing), Bharara's office oversaw the Galleon Group insider trading investigation against Raj Rajaratnam, Rajat Gupta, Anil Kumar and more than 60 others. Rajaratnam was convicted at trial on 14 counts related to insider trading. Bharara is said to have "reaffirmed his office’s leading role in pursuing corporate crime with this landmark insider trading case, which relied on aggressive prosecutorial methods and unprecedented tactics."

In 2011 when hedge fund portfolio manager Chip Skowron pleaded guilty to insider trading, Bharara said: "Chip Skowron is the latest example of a portfolio manager willing to pay for proprietary, non-public information that gave him an illegal trading edge over the average investor. The integrity of our market is damaged by people who engage in insider trading...." Skowron was sent to prison for five years. Bharara has often spoken publicly about his work and written an op-ed about the culture surrounding corporate crime and its effect on market confidence and business risk.

After 85 straight convictions for insider-trading cases, he finally lost one on July 17, 2014. This was when a jury acquitted Rajaratnam's younger brother, Rengan, of such charges.

On October 22, 2015, Bharara dropped seven insider-trading cases two weeks after the U.S. Supreme Court refused to a review a lower court decision that would make it harder to pursue wrongful-trading cases. The conviction of Michael S. Steinberg was dropped; Steinberg was the highest-ranking officer of SAC Capital Advisors who had previously been convicted of insider trading.

In 2013, Bharara announced criminal and civil charges against one of the largest and most successful hedge-fund firms in the United States, SAC Capital Advisors LP, and its founder Steven A. Cohen. At USD$1.8 billion, it was the largest settlement ever for insider trading, and the firm also agreed to close down.

==== Citibank ====
Citibank was charged numerous times by Bharara's office and other federal prosecutors. In 2012, the bank reached a settlement with Bharara's office to pay $158 million for misleading the government into insuring risky loans. Bharara also made a criminal inquiry into Citibank's Mexican banking unit In 2014, Citi settled with federal prosecutors for $7 billion for ignoring warnings on risky loans.

==== JPMorgan Chase ====
Almost as soon as he took office, Bharara began investigating the role of Bernie Madoff's primary banker, JPMorgan Chase. Eventually, Bharara and JPMorgan reached a deferred prosecution agreement that called for JPMorgan to forfeit $1.7 billion—the largest forfeiture ever demanded from a bank in American history—to settle charges that it and its predecessors violated the Bank Secrecy Act by failing to alert state and federal authorities about Madoff's actions.

Bharara's office also handled the criminal prosecutions of several employees at Madoff’s firm and their associates. They were convicted by a jury on March 24, 2014.

==== Bank of America ====
In 2012, federal prosecutors under Bharara sued Bank of America for $1 billion, accusing the bank of carrying out a mortgage scheme that defrauded the government during the depths of the financial crisis in 2008. In 2013, the jury found Bank of America liable for selling Fannie Mae and Freddie Mac thousands of defective loans in the first mortgage-fraud case brought by the U.S. government to go to trial. The civil verdict also found the bank’s Countrywide Financial unit and former Countrywide executive Rebecca Mairone liable. However, in 2016 the U.S. Court of Appeals for the Second Circuit ruled that the finding of fact by the jury that low-quality mortgages were supplied by Countrywide to Fannie Mae and Freddie Mac supported only "intentional breach of contract," not fraud. The action, for civil fraud, relied on provisions of the Financial Institutions Reform, Recovery and Enforcement Act. This decision turned on lack of intent to defraud at the time the contract to supply mortgages was made.

==== Russian money laundering fraud ====
In 2013, Bharara began investigating a money laundering fraud scheme in New York City operated by a Russian criminal organization. The alleged fraud links a $230 million Russian tax refund fraud scheme from 2008 to eleven U.S. real estate corporations. The underlying tax refund fraud was first discovered by whistleblower and Russian lawyer. His name was Sergei Magnitsky, who was arrested under tax evasion charges, and within a year he was found dead in his prison cell—a suspicious circumstance.

In April 2013, Bharara authorized the FBI to raid the apartment of businessman Alimzhan Tokhtakhunov in Trump Tower.

On April 13, 2013, Bharara was on a list released by the Russian Federation containing Americans banned from entering the country over their alleged human rights violations. The list was a direct response to the so-called Magnitsky list made public by the United States, which included 18 Russians who were subject to asset freezes and visa bans.

On September 10, 2013, with help from the Immigration and Customs Enforcement’s Homeland Security Investigations and Cyrus Vance Jr., the District Attorney for New York County, Bharara's office announced that they had filed a civil forfeiture complaint, freezing $24 million in assets.

==== Holocaust survivor fund fraud ====
During his first year in office, Bharara charged 17 managers and employees of the Conference on Jewish Material Claims for defrauding Germany $42.5 million by creating thousands of false benefit applications for people who did not suffer in the Holocaust. This fraud, which had been occurring for 16 years, was related to the $400 million that Germany paid out each year to Holocaust survivors.

==== Art fraud ====
During his time in office, Bharara oversaw multiple notable art-fraud cases including the $80-million Knoedler Gallery case, which was the largest art-fraud scheme in American history involving forged masterworks. of artists Mark Rothko, Robert Motherwell and others. Bharara brought charges in the $2.5-million case of John Re, a man from East Hampton, New York, who sold forged artwork by Jackson Pollock and others and was sentenced to five years in federal prison. Also Bharara charged Eric Spoutz, an American art dealer. Spoutz was charged with selling hundreds of fake paintings falsely attributed to American masters. Spoutz was sentenced to 41 months in federal prison and ordered to forfeit the $1.45 million he made from the scheme and to pay $154,100 in restitution.

==== Toyota deferred prosecution ====
In March 2014, the U.S. Attorney's Office charged Toyota by information with one count of wire fraud for lying to consumers about two safety-related issues in the company’s cars, each of which caused unintended acceleration. Under the terms of a deferred prosecution agreement (DPA) that Toyota entered into the same day the information was filed, Toyota agreed to pay a $1.2-billion financial penalty, the largest criminal penalty ever imposed on an auto manufacturer. The company also admitted the truth of a detailed statement of facts accompanying the DPA, and agreed to submit to a three-year monitorship.

=== Public corruption ===
During his tenure, Bharara "successfully prosecuted a dozen current or former state legislators, as well as 15 local officials, party leaders, political consultants and fund-raisers, including two current or former New York City Council members. Only one was acquitted". Bharara charged Republican Senator Vincent Leibell, Democratic Senator Hiram Monserrate, Democratic New York City Councilman Larry Seabrook, and Democratic Yonkers City Councilwoman Sandy Annabi. Bharara’s office uncovered an alleged corruption ring involving New York State Senator Carl Kruger, a Democrat. In April 2012, Kruger was sentenced to seven years in federal prison. In February 2011, Bharara announced the indictment of five consultants working on New York City’s electronic payroll and timekeeping project, CityTime, for misappropriating more than $80 million from the project.

On April 2, 2013, Bharara unsealed federal corruption charges against Democratic New York State Senator Malcolm Smith, Republican New York City Councilman Dan Halloran, and several other Republican party officials. The federal complaint alleged that Smith attempted to secure a spot on the Republican ballot in the 2013 New York City mayoral election through bribery and fraud.

==== New York Moreland Commission ====
In 2014, Bharara's office began an inquiry into Gov. Andrew Cuomo's decision to end the work of the Moreland Commission, an anticorruption panel. After a New York Times report documenting Cuomo's staff's involvement with the commission and subsequent statements by commissioners defending the Governor, Bharara warned of obstruction of justice and witness tampering.

==== Assembly Speaker Sheldon Silver ====
Bharara made national headlines after investigating 11-term Speaker of the New York State Assembly Sheldon Silver, a Democrat, for taking millions of dollars in payoffs. Silver was arrested in January 2015. Silver was subsequently convicted on all counts, triggering his automatic expulsion from the Assembly. During the Silver prosecution, Judge Valerie Caproni criticized Bharara's public statements, writing that "while castigating politicians in Albany for playing fast and loose with the ethical rules that govern their conduct, Bharara strayed so close to the edge of the rules governing his own conduct."

==== Senate Majority Leader Dean Skelos ====
Republican Senate Majority Leader Dean Skelos and his son, Adam Skelos, were arrested and charged with six counts of corruption on May 4, 2015. The criminal complaint included extortion, fraud, and bribe solicitation charges. Bharara accused Skelos of taking official actions to benefit various businesses in return for payments to his son. On May 28, 2015, Skelos and his son were indicted by a federal grand jury on six counts of bribery, extortion, wire fraud, and conspiracy. In July 2015, in an expanded indictment, federal prosecutors added bribery charges.

On December 11, 2015, a unanimous jury convicted Dean and Adam Skelos of all eight counts of bribery, extortion, and corruption. The trial verdict automatically terminated Dean Skelos from the state legislature. On September 26, 2017, the U.S. Court of Appeals for the Second Circuit vacated the convictions of the Skeloses and ordered a retrial. The retrial of Skelos and his son began on June 19, 2018. Following a retrial, Skelos and his son were found guilty of eight felonies on July 17, 2018. On October 23, 2018, Skelos was sentenced to four years and three months in federal prison.

=== Gang crimes and organized crime ===
From 2009 to 2014, the U.S. Attorney's Office for the Southern District of New York has convicted more than 1,000 of approximately 1,300 people charged in 52 large-scale takedowns of street drug and drug trafficking organizations. On lowering violent crime rates, Bharara has said, "You can measure the number of people arrested and the number of shootings, but success is when you lift the sense of intimidation and fear." Bharara also oversaw the largest criminal sweep of gangs in Newburgh, New York, working with the FBI, the Department of Homeland Security's Immigration and Customs Enforcement and local law enforcement agencies to bring charges against members of the Newburgh Bloods and Newburgh Latin Kings gangs, among others. In 2010, Bharara oversaw the prosecution of eight longshoremen on charges of participation in a multimillion-dollar cocaine trafficking enterprise along the Waterfront, operated by a Panamanian drug organization.

In January 2011, Bharara's office participated in a multi-state organized crime takedown, charging 26 members of the Gambino crime family with racketeering and murder, as well as narcotics and firearms charges. This action was part of a coordinated effort that also involved arrests in Brooklyn; Newark, New Jersey, and Providence, Rhode Island; according to the FBI, this was the largest single-day operation against the Mafia in U.S. history. In August 2016, Bharara's office charged 46 leaders, members, and associates of La Cosa Nostra—including four out of the Five Families (Gambino, Genovese, Lucchese, and Bonanno)—in an extensive racketeering conspiracy.

At a news conference on September 7, 2016 following the arrests of Shimen Liebowitz and Aharon Goldberg, which were two rabbis implicated in the Kiryas Joel murder conspiracy, Bharara called it a "chilling plot," wherein the plotters "met repeatedly to plan the kidnapping and to pay more than $55,000 to an individual they believed would carry it out." The rabbis were convicted and sentenced to prison in 2017.

=== Terrorism prosecutions ===
Under Bharara, the U.S. Attorney's Office for the Southern District of New York "won a string of major terrorism trials." Bharara was an advocate of trying terrorists in civilian federal courts rather than in the military commissions at the Guantanamo Bay detention camp. He contrasted his office's record of successfully convicting terrorists with the lengthy, secretive, and inefficient Guantanamo practice. In a 2014 interview, Bharara said the historical record would show that "greater transparency and openness and legitimacy" leads to "more serious and appropriate punishment." Citing his success in terrorism trials, Bharara stated: "These trials have been difficult, but they have been fair and open and prompt...in an American civilian courtroom, the American people and all the victims of terrorism can be vindicated without sacrificing our principles."

Some of the high-profile terrorist figures convicted and sentenced to life imprisonment during Bharara's term include Sulaiman Abu Ghaith, Osama bin Laden's son-in-law; They also included Khalid al-Fawwaz and Ahmed Khalfan Ghailani, Osama bin Laden aides who plotted the 1998 United States embassy bombings that killed 224 people; Mostafa Kamel Mostafa, a cleric who masterminded the 1998 kidnappings of 16 American, British and Australian tourists in Yemen; and Faisal Shahzad, the attempted Times Square bomber. Bharara also won a massive conviction and 25-year sentence for international arms smuggler Viktor Bout.

=== Cybercrime ===
In June 2012, The New York Times published an op-ed written by Bharara about the threat posed to private industry by cybercrime and encouraged corporate leaders to take preventive measures and create contingency plans.

Bharara's tenure saw a number of notable prosecutions for computer hacking:

- Bharara's office worked with Hector Xavier Monsegur ("Sabu"), a computer hacker who later became a federal informant. Because Monsegur's cooperation "helped the authorities infiltrate the shadowy world of computer hacking and disrupt at least 300 cyberattacks on targets that included the United States military," Bharara's office recommended a greatly reduced sentence to the judge, and in 2014 Monsegur was freed with only some of the time served.
- In May 2014, Bharara's office was part of an international crackdown, led by the FBI and authorities in 19 countries, on the "Blackshades" creepware hacking, in which hackers illicitly access users' systems remotely to steal information.
- In November 2015, Bharara's office charged three Israeli men in a 23-count indictment that alleged that they ran an extensive computer hacking and fraud scheme that targeted JPMorgan Chase, The Wall Street Journal, and ten other companies. According to prosecutors, the operation generated "hundreds of millions of dollars of illegal profit" and exposed the personal information of more than 100 million people.
- In May 2016, Bharara's office secured a guilty plea from Alonzo Knowles, a Bahamian man who had hacked into the email accounts of celebrities and athletes in order to steal unreleased movie and television scripts, unreleased music, "nude and intimate images and videos," financial documents, and other personal and sensitive information. Knowles was sentenced to five years in prison.
- In November 2016, Bharara's office filed charges against a Phoenix, Arizona man, Jonathan Powell, for hacking into thousands of email accounts at Pace University and another university and mining those accounts for users' confidential information.
- In December 2016, Bharara's office charged three Chinese citizens with hacking into the system of New York law firms advising on mergers and acquisitions, and making more than $4 million by trading on information they gained.
- Also in December 2016, Bharara's office charged an executive of the Pakistani-based company Axact with conspiracy to commit wire fraud and aggravated identity theft in connection. Prosecutors say that the company carried out a $140 million diploma mill that defrauded thousands of consumers across the world.

Bharara moved to shut down several of the world's largest Internet poker companies. He prosecuted several payment processors for Internet poker companies. He effectively secured guilty pleas for money laundering. In April 2011, Bharara charged 11 founding members of internet gambling companies and their associates involved with pay processing with bank fraud, money laundering and illegal gambling under the Unlawful Internet Gambling Enforcement Act of 2006 (UIGEA). The case is United States v. Scheinberg.

=== Devyani Khobragade incident ===
Bharara and his office came to the limelight again in December 2013 with the arrest of Devyani Khobragade, the Deputy Consul General of India in New York, who was accused by prosecutors of submitting false work visa documents for her housekeeper and paying the housekeeper "far less than the minimum legal wage." The ensuing incident caused protests from the Indian government and a rift in India–United States relations; Indians expressed outrage that Khobragade was strip-searched (a routine practice for all U.S. Marshals Service arrestees) and held in the general inmate population. The Indian government retaliated for what it viewed as the mistreatment of its consular official by revoking the ID cards and other privileges of U.S. consular personnel and their families in India and removing security barriers in front of the U.S. Embassy in New Delhi.

Khobragade was subject to prosecution at the time of her arrest because she had only consular immunity (this which gives one immunity from prosecution only for acts committed in connection with official duties) and not the more extensive diplomatic immunity. After her arrest, the Indian government moved Khobragade to the Indian's mission to the U.N., upgrading her status and conferring diplomatic immunity on her; as a result, the federal indictment against Khobragade was dismissed in March 2014, although the door was left open to refiling of charges. A new indictment was filed against Khobragade, but by that point she had left the country.

Speaking at Harvard Law School during its 2014 Class Day ceremony, Bharara said that it was the U.S. Department of State, rather than his office that initiated and investigated proceedings against Khobragade and who asked his office to prosecute.

=== Reason magazine subpoena ===
During Bharara's term, the U.S. Attorney's Office investigated six Internet comments made on the website of Reason magazine in which anonymous readers made comments about U.S. District Judge Katherine B. Forrest of the Southern District of New York like "Its [sic] judges like these that should be taken out back and shot" and "Why waste ammunition? Wood chippers get the message across clearly." (The comments were made under an article in the magazine of Forrest's sentencing of Silk Road owner Ross William Ulbricht to life in prison without parole.) In June 2015, a federal grand jury issued a subpoena to the libertarian magazine, demanding that it provide identifying information for the commenters. Following the issuance of the subpoena, federal prosecutors applied for an order from a U.S. magistrate judge forbidding the magazine from disclosing the existence of the subpoena to the commenters.

The subpoena became public after being obtained by Popehat's Ken White. The nondisclosure order caused controversy, with critics saying that it infringed the constitutional right to free speech and questioning whether the comments were actually serious threats or merely hyperbolic "trolling." Federal prosecutors dropped the matter as moot. Reason magazine editors Matt Welch and Nick Gillespie characterized the subpoena and nondisclosure order as "suppressing the speech of journalistic outlets known to be critical of government overreach."

=== Dismissal ===
Following the 2016 election, Bharara met with then-president-elect Donald Trump at Trump Tower in November 2016. Bharara said that Trump asked him to remain as U.S. Attorney, and he agreed to stay on.

On March 10, 2017, U.S. Attorney General Jeff Sessions ordered all 46 remaining United States Attorneys who were holdovers from the Obama administration, including Bharara, to submit letters of resignation. Bharara declined to resign. He was fired the next day from Trump's administration. He was succeeded by his deputy attorney, Joon Kim, as acting U.S. Attorney for the Southern District of New York.

In a public statement at the time, Bharara said that serving as U.S. Attorney was "the greatest honor of my professional life" and that "one hallmark of justice is absolute independence and that was my touchstone every day that I served". There were expressions of dismay over the firing from Howard Dean, U.S. Senators Chuck Schumer and Elizabeth Warren, as well as from New York State Republican Assemblymen Steve McLaughlin and Brian Kolb, the Assembly Minority Leader.

On June 13, 2017, ProPublica reported that in the spring of 2017, Trump's personal attorney Marc Kasowitz told associates that he had been responsible for getting Bharara fired. Kasowitz reportedly had warned Trump, "This guy is going to get you." In September 2017, however, Bharara said a series of conversational telephone calls from Trump made him increasingly uncomfortable about the appearance of potential improper contact between his office and the Trump office. Bharara added that he finally refused to take a telephone call from Trump and was dismissed 22 hours later.

== Later career and other endeavors ==
On April 1, 2017, Bharara joined New York University School of Law as a distinguished scholar in residence.

In September 2017, Bharara started a weekly podcast called "Stay Tuned with Preet", which features long-form interviews with prominent guests. In 2018, Bharara started a second podcast with former New Jersey Attorney General and fellow law professor Anne Milgram, "Cafe Insider", which also provides legal commentary on the latest news. After Milgram was nominated by President Joe Biden to serve as Administrator of the Drug Enforcement Administration, she was replaced as co-host with former U.S. Attorney for the Northern District of Alabama Joyce Vance.

Bharara was an executive producer on the Zeshan B 2024 album, O Say, Can You See?.

As of 2025, Bharara is a partner at the WilmerHale law firm.

== In popular culture ==
The Showtime television series Billions gives a fictional portrayal of the U.S. Attorney's Office of the Southern District of New York's prosecution of financial crimes. The series is loosely based on the investigation of hedge fund manager Steven A. Cohen of S.A.C. Capital Advisors by Bharara's office. The show's fictional SDNY U.S. Attorney Charles "Chuck" Rhoades Jr., played by Paul Giamatti, was partly inspired by Bharara.

== Personal life ==
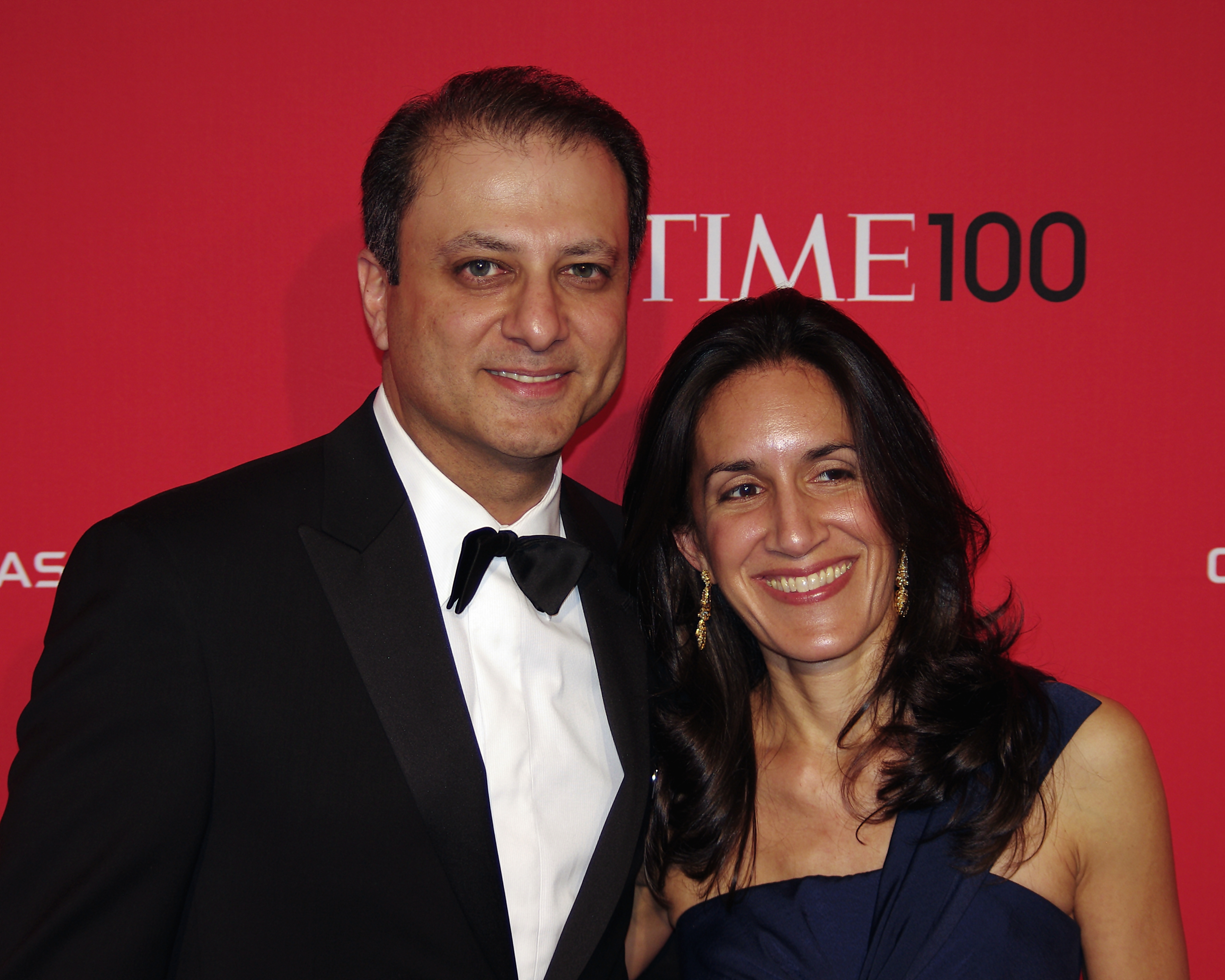
Bharara with his wife at the 2012 Time 100 gala

Bharara is married to Dalya Bharara, a non-practicing attorney. As of 2016, the Bhararas lived in Scarsdale, New York with their three children. In interviews, Bharara "has reflected on his family's diverse religious heritage: Sikh (his father), Hindu (his mother), Muslim (his wife's father) and Jewish (his wife's grandmother)."

Bharara is a registered Democrat but "not considered a strong partisan."

Bharara's younger brother Vinit "Vinnie" Bharara, also a graduate of Columbia Law School, is an entrepreneur. Vinnie Bharara and Marc Lore co-founded Quidsi, the parent company of Diapers.com and Soap.com, which they sold in 2010 to Amazon.com for $540 million.

Bharara is a fan of Bruce Springsteen. The admiration seems to be reciprocal as at an October 2012 concert in Hartford, Connecticut Springsteen shouted, "This is for Preet Bharara!" before launching into his song "Death to My Hometown".

== Works ==
- Bharara, Preet (March 19, 2019). Doing Justice: A Prosecutor's Thoughts on Crime, Punishment, and the Rule of Law. New York: Knopf. ISBN 9780525521129. OCLC 1073034857.
- Bharara, Preet (January 25, 2022). Justice Is... A Guide for Young Truth Seekers. New York: Crown Books for Young Readers. ISBN 9780593176627.

== See also ==
- Indians in the New York City metropolitan region
- Legal affairs of the first Donald Trump presidency

Legal offices
Preceded by Lev Dassin; Acting	United States Attorney for the Southern District of New York; 2009–2017	Succeeded by Joon Kim; Acting
