= Raj Rajaratnam, Galleon Group, Anil Kumar, and Rajat Gupta insider trading cases =

Civil and criminal actions by the U.S. SEC and DOJ

The Raj Rajaratnam/Galleon Group, Anil Kumar, and Rajat Gupta inside trading cases are parallel and related civil and criminal actions by the U.S. Securities and Exchange Commission and the United States Department of Justice against three friends and business partners: Galleon Group hedge fund founder-owner Raj Rajaratnam and former McKinsey & Company senior executives Anil Kumar and Rajat Gupta. In these proceedings, the men were confronted with insider trading charges: Rajaratnam was convicted, Kumar pleaded guilty and testified as key witness in the criminal trials of Rajaratnam and Gupta, and Gupta was convicted in United States District Court for the Southern District of New York in Manhattan in June 2012.

== Rajaratnam charges and trial ==
On October 16, 2009, defendants Raj Rajaratnam and Anil Kumar were arrested and indicted for insider trading and conspiracy. The charges stemmed from an investigation by the United States Attorney's Office (USAO) into allegations that Rajaratnam conspired in insider trading of stock for several large companies. Rajaratnam was found guilty on all 14 charges and sentenced to 11 years in prison for profiting from tips he received from Robert Moffat, Anil Kumar, Rajiv Goel, and Roomy Khan. Danielle Chiesi was sentenced to 30 months in prison with 2 years of supervised release.

During the discovery phase of the criminal trial, the USAO turned over to the defendants the contents of 18,150 wiretapped communications involving 550 different people, which were recorded over the course of sixteen months from ten telephones, including home, office and mobile lines belonging to the defendants.

Kumar maintained a low profile outside McKinsey until an October 2009 arrest in conjunction with an ongoing and wide-ranging US governmental investigation into insider trading. Former mentor Rajat Gupta was later arrested by the FBI in a related case, prompting inquiries into McKinsey's senior leadership and business model.

As of December 2009, Kumar was no longer at the consultancy. In January 2010 he pleaded guilty to insider trading charges and was the government's star witness in March 2011 in U.S. v Rajaratnam against his billionaire friend and Galleon Group founder Raj Rajaratnam. In the sprawling case his involvement was unusual; according to a Reuters blog, “He’s the only informant who could be considered even more successful than Raj was, at least professionally if not in terms of raw cash. Raj had money, more money than he really knew what to do with, but Kumar had much more societal acceptance and prestige.” He settled with the SEC in May 2010 for $2.8 million, the amount after gains he received from Rajaratnam through a Swiss bank account in a domestic worker's name. Gupta, Rajaratnam, and Kumar were all close friends and had founded the $1.3-billion private equity firm New Silk Route together, though Rajaratnam and Kumar withdrew before the firm began operation.

On October 26, 2011 the United States Attorney's Office filed charges against Rajat Gupta. He was arrested in New York City by the FBI and pleaded not guilty. He was released on $10 million bail (secured by his Connecticut house) on the same day. Gupta's lawyer wrote in an e-mail quoted in Bloomberg, “Any allegation that Rajat Gupta engaged in any unlawful conduct is totally baseless .... He did not trade in any securities, did not tip Mr. Rajaratnam so he could trade, and did not share in any profits as part of any quid pro quo.” "The tips generated 'illicit profits and loss avoidance' of more than $23 million, the [SEC] alleged in [the] lawsuit. 'Rajat Gupta was entrusted by some of the premier institutions of American business to sit inside their boardrooms, among their executives and directors and receive their confidential information so that he could give advice and counsel,' said Manhattan U.S. Attorney Preet Bharara, whose office is prosecuting the case."

=== Origins of the case ===
On Friday October 16, 2009, Raj Rajaratnam was arrested by the FBI and accused of conspiring with others in insider trading in several publicly traded companies. U.S. Attorney Preet Bharara put the total profits in the scheme at over $60 million, telling a news conference it was the largest hedge fund insider trading case in United States history. Jim Walden, an attorney for Mr. Rajaratnam, said his client is innocent and will fight the insider-trading charges.

Rajaratnam allegedly profited from information received from:

- Robert Moffat, a senior executive of IBM considered next in line to be CEO
- Anil Kumar, a senior executive of McKinsey and close friend of Gupta (its former CEO) who was later also accused of passing information to Rajaratnam
- Rajiv Goel, a midlevel Intel Capital executive
- Roomy Khan, previously convicted of wire fraud for providing inside information from her employer, Intel, to Rajaratnam.

It was reported that Rajaratnam, Goel and Kumar were all part of the class of 1983 from Wharton school.

The Sri Lankan stock market fell sharply after his arrest on insider trading charges in October 2009. Sri Lanka's Securities and Exchange Commission is reviewing the active stock trading of Raj Rajaratnam with a view of identifying any insider trading.

It said he also conspired to get confidential information on the $5 billion purchase by Warren Buffett’s Berkshire Hathaway of Goldman Sachs preferred stock before the September 2008 announcement of that transaction. The Wall Street Journal reported in April that a former member of the board of directors of Goldman Sachs and former McKinsey & Company chief executive Rajat Gupta told Rajaratnam about Berkshire's investment before it became public. Gupta stood to profit as would-be chairman of Galleon International, a co-founder of New Silk Route with Rajaratnam, and as a friend of Rajaratnam. In March 2011 Gupta was charged in an administrative proceeding by the SEC. Gupta maintained his innocence, countersued, won dismissal of the administrative charge, then was arrested on criminal charges.

== Gupta charges and trial ==
On March 19, 2010, it was announced that Gupta had decided not to stand for re-election to the Goldman Sach's board of directors. At the time this was seen as a reaction to the insider trading implications; however, wiretaps released over a year later in U.S. v Rajaratnam of Anil Kumar speaking to Rajaratnam reveal an anticipated conflict-of-interest with a senior advisory role at Kohlberg Kravis Roberts. Gupta has since stepped down as senior advisor to KKR.

On April 15, 2010, the Wall Street Journal reported that federal prosecutors in the United States were investigating Gupta's involvement in providing insider information to Rajaratnam during the 2008 financial crisis, in particular the $5 billion Berkshire Hathaway investment in Goldman Sachs at the height of the crisis. Coverage of the event noted that Anil Kumar — who, like Gupta, had graduated from IIT, was a longtime highly regarded senior partner at McKinsey, and had also co-founded the ISB — had already pleaded guilty to charges in the same case. Gupta, Kumar, and Rajaratnam were all close friends and business partners.

When Goldman Sachs CEO Lloyd Blankfein asked Gupta about his insider trading rumors breaking in the press, Gupta replied, “I wouldn’t have had anything to do with that."

On March 1, 2011, the SEC filed an administrative civil complaint against Gupta for insider trading. It is alleged that he illegally tipped Rajaratnam with insider information about Goldman Sachs and Procter & Gamble while serving on the boards of both companies. Rajaratnam, it is alleged, "used the information from Gupta to illegally profit in hedge fund trades. ... The information on Goldman made Rajaratnam's funds $17 million richer. ... The Procter & Gamble data created illegal profits of more than $570,000 for Galleon funds managed by others," the SEC said.

"After a [Goldman Sachs] board call ... Mr. Gupta is said to have hung up the phone and called Mr. Rajartnam 23 seconds later. The next morning, the SEC says, Galleon funds sold their Goldman holdings, avoiding losses of more than $3 million," The New York Times continued.

Gupta "vigorously denied the SEC accusations." His white-collar criminal attorney Gary Naftalis of Kramer Levin Naftalis & Frankel LLP "strongly denied that [Gupta had] done anything wrong" in 2010 when Gupta's name was first mentioned relative to the case and said in March 2011 that the SEC charges were "totally baseless." Naftalis went on to say "that Gupta is not accused of receiving anything in exchange for information provided [and that] Gupta lost his entire investment in Galleon by fall 2008." The lost investment was specified to be "USD 10 million ... in the Galleon Buccaneers Voyager Fund."

Naftalis said on March 1 that "Gupta is not accused of receiving anything in exchange for information." Yet a week later in U.S. v Rajaratnam it emerged that "Mr Rajaratnam ... might pay Mr Gupta with a large stake in the fund, and that Mr Rajaratnam loaned Mr Gupta money so he could increase his investment in a Galleon fund.” It also emerged that Mr. Gupta was in talks to become chairman of Galleon International, and therefore also stood to profit. Wiretaps in U.S. v Rajaratnam were later played of Gupta asking Rajaratnam, "I want ... us to keep having the dialog as to ... how I can be helpful in Galleon International [and] Galleon Group."

After Rajaratnam's conviction and the revelations about to Gupta in the Rajaratnam trial, the difficulty of SEC's proving even the civil charges against Gupta was still deemed considerable by observers. Among other aspects, the May, 2011, Bloomberg report noted that, "[r]emarkably, none of Gupta's alleged criminal tips to Rajaratnam appear to have been captured on the FBI's wiretaps." But the report also noted a March 2010 e-mail from Gupta to Ajit Rangnekar, dean of the Indian School of Business, with denials, assertions and, in the reporter's opinion, "obvious inaccuracies," leaving many questions on how the cases and story would yet unfold.

In the immediate aftermath of the SEC's filing of charges on March 1, 2011, "[s]pokesmen at American Airlines and Harman said they had no comment. Genpact, where Gupta is chairman, issued a statement saying he 'has made invaluable contributions to Genpact, and has always sought to hold Genpact to the highest standards of integrity and corporate governance.’” Gupta also served on the board of and Procter & Gamble (P&G), but stepped down immediately on March 1, 2011 "to prevent any distraction to the P&G board and our business," said a spokesman. On March 7, 2011 he resigned from the boards of AMR Corp, American Airlines, Harman International and ultimately Genpact Ltd.

On March 10, 2011, Gupta stepped down as chair of the International Chamber of Commerce “until a satisfactory resolution of the case." On March 15 he stepped down as chairman of the Public Health Foundation of India. On March 20 he resigned as chairman of the Indian School of Business, after some controversy at the school and in India. On March 29 he stepped down as advisor to the Gates foundation. By April 2011 he had resigned from every board chairmanship or membership.

In the high-profile insider trading case U.S. v Rajaratnam unfolding near the same time (March 2011), wiretaps were played of Gupta describing to Rajaratnam elements of the confidential meetings of the board of directors of Goldman Sachs, including its possible willingness to purchase commercial bank Wachovia or insurer AIG. On March 15, 2011 an FBI wiretap from July 28, 2008 was played in the U.S. v Rajaratnam trial between Rajat Gupta and Raj Rajaratnam in which the two men discuss Goldman Sachs, Anil Kumar, Galleon International and Kohlberg Kravis Roberts. The tapes caused concern for several reasons:

- confidentiality Gupta revealed board-privileged material on Goldman Sachs to Rajaratnam, after a 34-year career respecting client confidentiality at McKinsey. This by itself, however, is unlikely to be sufficient to criminally charge Gupta, as it may not meet the standard for insider trading. The call can simply be construed as one friend calling another for help in preparing for a meeting with Gary Cohn, Goldman's president. (“AIG was definitely in the discussion mix.”)
- habituality Gupta's information to Rajaratnam was delivered very casually, as though it were not uncommon. A Bloomberg profile quotes a CEO saying the wiretaps "sounded to him just like Gupta consulting a client."
- gain A key notion in insider trading is that of benefit to the tipper. This benefit does not have to be monetary; in the case of Galleon co-conspirator Robert Moffat of IBM, the gain was relational with Danielle Chiesi. Here the gain is clearly a chairman role in Rajaratnam-owned Galleon International and further investment opportunities with Rajaratnam, including New Silk Route and other Galleon funds. (“You’ve given me a position at Galleon International…that’s good enough.”)
- complicity Gupta, as head of McKinsey for a decade, was well aware of McKinsey's rules prohibiting outside consulting. Yet he was neither surprised nor upset at protégé and business partner Anil Kumar’s illegal (by McKinsey rules) external dealings with Rajaratnam, particularly the offshore cash payments. It remains unclear whether Gupta was aware Rajaratnam was paying Kumar for inside information. (“I think you're being very generous...he [Kumar] should sometimes say thank you for that.”)
- legal maneuvering Gupta's lawyer had released statements saying "There are no tapes or any other direct evidence of me tipping Mr Rajaratnam" and that "the business relationship between Mr Rajaratnam and I were strained." Yet the tapes reveal Gupta divulging confidential (if not material nonpublic) information, and Gupta asking Rajaratnam for career advice. (“I wanted to get your straight opinion on whether you think I should do this KKR thing.”)
- fragmentation In another tape, Anil Kumar asks Rajaratnam, "It’s now reached a point where it’s physically and humanly impossible to do the things he’s doing, right?" and the two wonder about Gupta's "fragmented" state. In another wiretap, Rajaratnam suggests to Kumar that Gupta "seemed tormented" at their last meeting.

As the tapes were released McKinsey was holding its regular annual partners conference, and according to a spokeswoman was "monitoring the matter and taking it seriously as you would expect.” They later released a statement saying they were "appalled and deeply dismayed." The firm has come under heavy criticism for having its former longtime senior partners and leaders (Gupta and Kumar) as well as a junior partner (Palecek) all involved in the insider trading scandal. On March 18, 2011 Gupta countersued the SEC (SDNY 11 Cv. 1900). The court filing read, "Mr. Gupta denies all allegations of wrongdoing and stands ready to mount a defense against each and every one of the Commission's charges. Yet under current Commission rules, Mr. Gupta would be deprived of a jury trial, the right to use the discovery procedures of the federal court to shape his defense and the protections of the federal rules of evidence, which were crafted to bar unreliable evidence." The countersuit said the SEC action "'unfairly and unconstitutionally' singles him out,” as he is to date the only person not employed by a broker-dealer ever charged by the SEC in administrative proceedings. It is not known whether the provisions of Dodd-Frank (the law allowing for SEC administrative proceedings in this instance) may be applied retroactively to before the law's existence, as the SEC has claimed in charging Gupta.

On March 23, 2011 Goldman Sachs CEO Lloyd Blankfein testified that Gupta had in fact divulged board-privileged material to Rajaratnam, though the particular information was allegedly confidential and not material nonpublic (the legal standard for insider trading).

In July 2011, U.S. District Judge Rakoff refused to throw out the countersuit against the SEC and in August, Gupta and the SEC agreed to drop their respective actions against each other. The judge had drawn attention to the fact that all 28 other SEC actions stemming from the Galleon case had been filed in federal court. As part of the August agreement, the SEC agreed to file any future charges against Gupta in federal court in New York where they would be assigned to Rakoff. There was no comment on whether such charges would be filed.

Just over three months after the SEC allegations of insider trading, Goldman Sachs shareholder James Mercer filed suit against Gupta "seeking to recover any 'short-swing' profits on Goldman's behalf."

In late September, 2011, The Wall Street Journal reported that federal prosecutors were "fully committed" to filing criminal charges and were "moving closer toward bringing" them. They had previously sparred over how, when, and whether to arrest or sue Gupta, in "a bitter dispute between federal prosecutors and securities regulators."

On October 26, 2011 the United States Attorney's Office filed charges against Gupta. He was arrested in New York City by the FBI and pleaded not guilty. He was released on $10 million bail (secured by his Connecticut house) on the same day. Gupta's lawyer wrote in an e-mail quoted in Bloomberg, “Any allegation that Rajat Gupta engaged in any unlawful conduct is totally baseless .... He did not trade in any securities, did not tip Mr. Rajaratnam so he could trade, and did not share in any profits as part of any quid pro quo.” "The tips generated 'illicit profits and loss avoidance' of more than $23 million, the [SEC] alleged in [the] lawsuit. 'Rajat Gupta was entrusted by some of the premier institutions of American business to sit inside their boardrooms, among their executives and directors, and receive their confidential information so that he could give advice and counsel,' said Manhattan U.S. Attorney Preet Bharara, whose office is prosecuting the case."

Former Federal prosecutor Douglas Burns, who in March had said he expected an SEC-Gupta consent agreement, also previewed a Gupta no-quid pro quo defense plan on Bloomberg the day of the arrest.

Three days before Gupta's arrest, Rajaratnam was reported to have said that the prosecutors had wanted him to wear a wire and tape his conversations with Gupta. "It was Rajaratnam’s understanding that were he to plead guilty and wear a wire, he might be offered a sentence of as little as five years. With good behavior, he could be out in 85 percent of that time," the report continued. Rajaratnam did not — and has not ever, at time of writing — cooperated with federal prosecutors. He has been sentenced to 11 years in prison.

The trial on six counts of securities fraud and one count of conspiracy will commence before Judge Rakoff May 21, 2011. The case is U.S. v. Gupta, 11-cr-00907, U.S. District Court, Southern District of New York (Manhattan). The date represents a six-week delay granted the defense after the prosecution broadened the indictment, adding a new charge based on a March 12, 2007, conference call and also regarding Goldman information. Each of the fraud counts carries up to 20 years in prison and the conspiracy count up to five years. Gupta also faces a fine of as much as $5 million, prosecutors said. They also said that his "investments with Rajaratnam -- $10 million and an ownership stake in at least two funds -- gave him the motive to engage in insider trading", according to one news report. The parties also discussed another possible Rajaratnam "tipster" being investigated at Goldman. The second individual had no relation to the Gupta charges and the judge agreed with the prosecution to keep the witness statements on the individual under seal. David Loeb, a Goldman Sachs managing director, Henry King, a Goldman Sachs analyst, and Matthew Korenberg, a Goldman Sachs analyst, are being investigated by the government as tippers to hedge funds.

The same day as US v. Gupta, the SEC sued Gupta again (this time not in an administrative proceeding) over civil claims related to the criminal charges in US v. Gupta.

In April, 2012, another charge relating to passing P&G information was added by the prosecution. Gupta's lawyers said that "newly added charges -- like the ones brought last year -- are not based on any direct evidence, but rely on supposed circumstantial evidence". More new charges based on new information may follow. Also in April, CNBC reported that the U.S. Attorney's office in Los Angeles was investigating an unnamed current Goldman employee for providing inside information about Apple and Intel to Rajaratnam. The defense has maintained that "the wrong person is on trial".

In early May, 2012, a pre-trial defense motion for access to SEC settlement-negotiation documents was denied by Judge Rakoff. Also in early May, the prosecution made a motion to play in trial three FBI wiretaps of two Rajaratnam "conversations with his principal trader and another with Galleon's then portfolio manager" related to the Goldman Sachs information. As well, details of wiretap recordings and trading activity related to the charges were analyzed at length in the media, assessing the strengths and weaknesses of the prosecution's and defense's cases.

On June 15, 2012, Gupta was found guilty of conspiracy and three counts of securities fraud. He was acquitted on two counts of securities fraud in federal court in New York. He was sentenced to two years in prison and fined $5 million. In March 2016, Gupta completed the last two months of his sentence under house arrest.

=== FriendsofRajat.com ===
"[W]orld-renowned speaker Deepak Chopra and Mukesh Ambani, the ninth-richest man in the world [and] ... chairman of Reliance Industries", were among supporters of Gupta's registered on a friendsofrajat.com website prior to the trial. The site was established by retired McKinsey associate of Gupta's Atul Kanagat. This has come into play in the trial of Gupta for character witness purposes.

== Relationships of Rajaratnam, Gupta and Kumar ==
Rajat Gupta and Anil Kumar were senior partners together at McKinsey & Company for over a decade, among the earliest and best-regarded Indian-Americans in management consulting. They became friends and enjoyed a mentor-protégé relationship early into Kumar's career as senior partner. The two men co-founded the Indian School of Business in 1997 and "were the face of McKinsey in India."

According to The Financial Times, "the two operated as a forceful double-act to secure business for McKinsey, win access in Washington and build a brotherhood of donors around the Hyderabad-based ISB and a handful of social initiatives."

Gupta first met Raj Rajaratnam while fundraising with Kumar for the Indian School of Business in 1999. Rajaratnam and Kumar had attended Wharton business school together in the 1980s. Two years later Gupta and Rajaratnam served together on the board of directors of the American India Foundation.

In 1999 Rajaratnam filed a lawsuit against the Gupta-advised TeleSoft partners and its founder Arjun Gupta (no relation), a former McKinsey consultant himself

Gupta, Rajaratnam, and Kumar were all involved to varying degrees in the creation of private-equity firms Taj Capital and New Silk Route. Gupta had written Rajaratnam's home address as his own in the fund formation papers. Rajaratnam and Kumar were founding partners of the private-equity firms but left before they began operation. Kumar testified that he was "treated...poorly" by his friends in the formation of the firms. Gupta remained founding partner and chairman of New Silk Route, and Rajaratnam eventually invested $50 million in New Silk Route.

While they were both senior partners, Gupta and Kumar "created a company called Mindspirit LLC in 2001 as a vehicle for their two families to make investments." Mindspirit consulted with Infogroup and its then-CEO Vinod Gupta (also no relation) in return for stock options, though an Infogroup SEC filing would later question the payment and the business relationship between the two companies. Vinod Gupta would also say that Mindspirit was "created by the wives of Rajat Gupta and Anil Kumar." Rajat Gupta and Anil Kumar's work at Mindspirit and the relationship with Genpact both broke McKinsey's own rules on external for-profit involvements, according to McKinsey's head of communications — though it was later shown that McKinsey had no rule explicitly prohibiting such consulting. Former President Bill Clinton was also an investor in the Infogroup transaction; his daughter Chelsea previously worked under Gupta and Kumar at McKinsey. Clinton had also served as chairman of the American India Foundation with Gupta and Rajaratnam.

During the dot-com bubble of the late 1990s, Gupta and Kumar had created a program to allow McKinsey to accept stock in lieu of consulting fees.

Rajaratnam intended to make Gupta chairman of "Galleon International," an expansion of the Galleon Group. Rajaratnam considered paying Gupta "with a large stake in the fund."

Gupta was "a regular presence at Galleon’s offices ... and showed up there periodically for lunch. Mr. Rajaratnam’s secretary would order in Indian or Chinese food and the two men would sit in Mr. Rajaratnam’s office and chat." Gupta visited Rajaratnam "biweekly" in September 2008 during the 2008 financial crisis.

Rajaratnam and Kumar vacationed together in Kenya, Africa and Miami, Florida. Kumar was a regular visitor to Gupta's houses in Connecticut, Colorado, Manhattan and Florida. Gupta was "regularly invited" to Rajaratnam's house in Manhattan and for Galleon parties.

Gupta and Rajaratnam were also connected through Goldman Sachs. From 2006 - 2010 Gupta served on the board of the bank, by which point Rajaratnam's Galleon Group "paid hundreds of millions of dollars a year to its Wall Street banks and in return regularly received market information that would not have been disclosed to most investors." Gupta and Rajaratnam also used their Goldman Sachs relationships to market New Silk Route.

Gupta and Kumar both personally invested in Rajaratnam's Galleon funds, though Gupta lost a $10 million investment in Galleon's Voyager fund. Rajaratnam also "loaned Mr Gupta money so he could increase his investment in a Galleon fund."

Gupta knew that Rajaratnam was sending money to Kumar against McKinsey policies and possibly illegally.

The three men were also not above gossip: Rajaratnam said Gupta "seemed tormented" while on the phone with Kumar, then turned around and called Kumar a "mini-Rajat" while on the phone with Gupta. Rajaratnam also told Kumar that "there had been a lot of innuendos" about Gupta and Lata Krishnan, with whom Gupta had co-founded the American India Foundation.

== Other concurrent insider-trading cases ==
With the conviction of Gupta, the US attorney in Manhattan Bharara's office had the case of Anthony Chiasson, a co-founder of the once-prominent hedge fund Level Global Investors, still ahead of it.

== Other cases stemming from Rajaratnam original case ==
The president of Insight Research, a privately held investment research company, has been arrested and charged with insider trading as part of the US government's investigation into illegal trading by the Galleon Group hedge fund. Tai Nguyen surrendered to the Federal Bureau of Investigation's New York office on June 26, 2012 according to an FBI spokesman. He later pleaded guilty to one count of conspiracy to commit securities fraud.

== See also ==
- Chip Skowron, hedge fund co-portfolio manager convicted of insider trading
- Mathew Martoma, hedge fund trader and portfolio manager convicted of insider trading
