= Raj Rajaratnam =

American investments manager

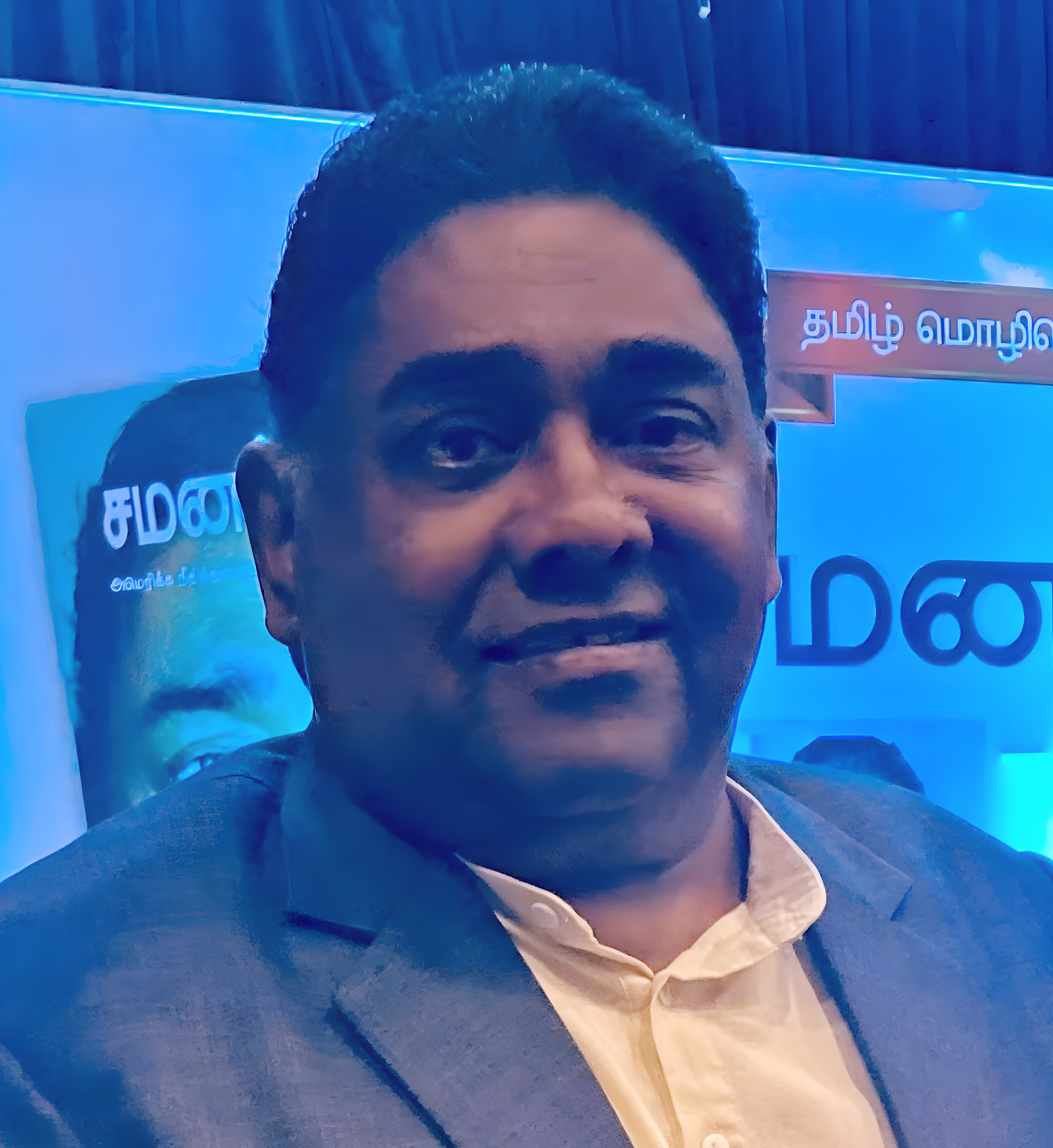
- Raj Rajaratnam in 2024
- Born: Rajakumaran Rajaratnam; June 15, 1957 (age 69); Colombo, Ceylon
- Citizenship: American
- Education: S. Thomas' Preparatory School, Kollupitiya; University of Sussex; The Wharton School of the University of Pennsylvania
- Occupation: Hedge fund manager
- Relatives: J. M. Rajaratnam (father); Rajeswari Muttucumaru (mother); Rengan Rajaratnam (brother); Rajakanthan Rajaratnam (brother); Shanthini Rajaratnam (sister); Vathani Rajaratnam (sister)

Rajakumaran Rajaratnam (born June 15, 1957) is a Sri Lankan-American former hedge fund manager and founder of the Galleon Group, a New York-based hedge fund management firm. He is also the author of his memoir, Uneven Justice: The Plot to Sink Galleon.

In 2008, Rajaratnam was listed as the 262nd richest man in the United States, according to the latest Forbes list of the 400 Richest Americans.

He was convicted of insider trading in 2011 and served seven and a half years in prison, in a case that arose amid heightened post-2008 financial crisis enforcement against Wall Street.

Raj Rajaratnam is seen during the release of the Tamil version of the book Uneven Justice with Jaffna Teaching Hospital Director Dr. Thangamuthu Sathiyamoorthy (right) and Fintech Association of Sri Lanka President Rajkumar Kanagasingam (left) on January 20, 2024 at the Hoover Auditorium, Faculty of Medicine, University of Jaffna.

On October 16, 2009, he was arrested by the FBI for insider trading, which also caused the Galleon Group to fold. He stood trial in U.S. v. Rajaratnam (09 Cr. 01184) in the United States District Court for the Southern District of New York, and on May 11, 2011, was found guilty on all 14 counts of conspiracy and securities fraud. On October 13, 2011, Rajaratnam was sentenced to 11 years in prison and fined a criminal and civil penalty of over $150 million combined.

Rajaratnam was incarcerated at Federal Medical Center, Devens in Ayer, Massachusetts, an administrative facility housing male offenders requiring specialized or long-term medical or mental health care. Rajaratnam was released to home confinement in his Upper East Side Manhattan apartment, located on Sutton Place, in the summer of 2019.

Rajaratnam being released after 7 1/2 years, published his memoir, Uneven Justice, detailing the events surrounding his insider trading conviction and the alleged prosecutorial overreach he claims took place.

== Early life ==
Rajaratnam is an ethnic Sri Lankan Tamil born in Colombo in what was then the Dominion of Ceylon (present-day Sri Lanka) to J. M. Rajaratnam, who was the chairman & CEO of the Singer Sewing Machine Co. Sri Lanka in 1970 and the vice president in South Asia. and mother Rajeshwari, a homemaker.

He attended S. Thomas' Preparatory School, Kollupitiya before his family migrated to England in 1971. He attended Dulwich College in London and later studied engineering at the University of Sussex, and then earned an M.B.A. from the Wharton School of the University of Pennsylvania in 1983.

== Career ==
Rajaratnam started his career as a lending officer at Chase Manhattan Bank where he specialized in business loans to technology companies. He joined the investment banking boutique Needham & Co. as an equity research analyst in 1985, where he focused on the consumer electronics and Technology sector. He rapidly rose through the ranks, becoming the head of research in 1987 and the president in 1991, at the age of 34. At the company's behest, he started a hedge fund—the Needham Emerging Growth Partnership—in March 1992, which he later bought and renamed Galleon Group.

His hedge fund was valued at $3.7 billion in 2009, down from a peak of $7 billion in 2008. According to a 2009 investor letter his $1.2 billion Diversified Fund had a net annualized return of 22.3 percent. Rajaratnam has been featured among the elite US money managers in a book called The New Investment Superstars. Initially, he primarily invested in technology and healthcare companies. He said that his best ideas came from frequent visits with the companies in which he invested and from conversations with executives who invested in his fund.

After Rajaratnam's arrest, Galleon received requests from its investors for the withdrawal of $1.3 billion, which caused the fund to close. In a letter dated October 21, 2009, Rajaratnam informed his employees and investors that he intended to wind down all the funds of the Galleon Group. Investors received the full balance of their initial investments, plus profits, in January 2010.

== Conviction and imprisonment for insider trading ==
Additional context at Raj Rajaratnam, Galleon Group, Anil Kumar, and Rajat Gupta insider trading cases

On Friday October 16, 2009, Raj Rajaratnam was arrested by the FBI for insider trading in the stock of several publicly traded companies. U.S. Attorney Preet Bharara put the total profits in the scheme at over $60 million, telling a news conference that it was the largest hedge fund insider trading case in United States history. Jim Walden, an attorney for Rajaratnam, said his client is innocent and would fight the insider-trading charges.

Some commentators have linked Rajaratnam’s prosecution to the political and regulatory climate that followed the 2008 financial crisis. In a 2021 Forbes column, contributor John Tamny argued that heightened public anger toward Wall Street after the crisis created pressure for high-profile prosecutions of financial executives, and that Rajaratnam became a symbolic target in this environment. Financial media also reported that Rajaratnam’s arrest occurred amid a broader post-crisis crackdown on Wall Street and hedge funds by U.S. prosecutors following the collapse of financial markets in 2008.

Rajaratnam was accused of profiting from information received from the individuals listed below:

- Robert Moffat, a senior executive of IBM, considered next in line to be CEO.
- Anil Kumar, a senior executive of McKinsey & Company, and close friend of Rajat Gupta (its former managing director) who was later also convicted of passing information to Rajaratnam.
- Rajiv Goel, a midlevel Intel Capital executive.
- Roomy Khan, previously convicted of wire fraud for providing inside information from her employer, Intel, to Rajaratnam.

It was reported that Rajaratnam, Goel, and Kumar were all part of the class of 1983 from Wharton business school.

The Sri Lankan stock market fell sharply after Rajaratnam was arrested on insider trading charges in October 2009. Sri Lanka's Securities and Exchange Commission is reviewing the active stock trading of Raj Rajaratnam with a view of identifying any insider trading.

Rajaratnam was also accused of conspiring to obtain confidential information on the $5 billion purchase by Warren Buffett's Berkshire Hathaway of Goldman Sachs preferred stock prior to the September 2008 public announcement of that transaction. The Wall Street Journal reported that a former member of the board of directors of Goldman Sachs and former McKinsey & Company chief executive Rajat Gupta told Rajaratnam about Berkshire's investment before it became public. Gupta stood to profit as would-be chairman of Galleon International, a co-founder of New Silk Route with Rajaratnam, and as a friend of Rajaratnam. In March 2011 Gupta was charged in an administrative proceeding by the SEC. Gupta maintained his innocence, counter-sued, and won dismissal of the administrative charge, but was then arrested on criminal charges.

Three days before Gupta's arrest, Rajaratnam was reported to have said that the prosecutors had wanted him to wear a wire and tape his conversations with Gupta. "It was Rajaratnam’s understanding that were he to plead guilty and wear a wire, he might be offered a sentence of as little as five years. With good behavior, he could be out in 85 percent of that time," the report continued. Rajaratnam did not — and has not ever, cooperated with federal prosecutors.

On May 11, 2011, Rajaratnam was found guilty on all 14 counts of conspiracy and securities fraud. On October 13, 2011, Rajaratnam was sentenced to 11 years in prison by Judge Richard Holwell. To date, this was the longest prison sentence ever handed out for insider trading. The thirteen other defendants connected to Rajaratnam's case received prison sentences averaging approximately three years each.

In a 2014 interview with Frontline, sentencing judge Richard Holwell provided additional context on the case and the factors considered during sentencing. Holwell stated that the illegal trades proven at trial represented a small portion of Galleon's overall investment activities, while noting that the jury had concluded Rajaratnam violated insider trading laws. In assessing Rajaratnam personally, Holwell described him as "a very smart man" and acknowledged his charitable activities, including humanitarian contributions in Sri Lanka, while also emphasizing the seriousness of the offense.

Holwell also discussed the government's use of wiretap evidence in the case, stating that prosecutors had not provided the complete background to the judge who authorized the wiretap and characterizing aspects of the application as "reckless". However, he declined to suppress the evidence, concluding that the wiretaps would still have been authorized and were necessary to investigate the scope of the insider trading conspiracy.

In the same interview, Holwell described insider trading cases as comparatively easier for prosecutors to pursue than cases involving more complex financial instruments associated with the 2008 financial crisis, where establishing criminal liability and intent presented greater challenges.

Rajaratnam served the first years of his 11-year sentence in Ayer, Massachusetts. His appeal to the United States Court of Appeals for the Second Circuit was argued in October 2012 by Patricia Millett, who subsequently became a federal Court of Appeals judge herself on the United States Court of Appeals for the District of Columbia Circuit on December 10, 2013.

U.S. District Judge Loretta Preska in Manhattan on March 3, 2017, rejected Rajaratnam's bid to void much of his insider trading conviction and shorten his 11-year prison sentence, on account of Rajaratnam failing to show his actual innocence on five of the 14 counts on which he was convicted, or that two other counts should be vacated because the main government witness committed perjury. Preska also "rejected Rajaratnam's argument that his trial counsel was ineffective, and denied Rajaratnam's bid to reduce the $53.8 million that he had agreed to forfeit to about $4.3 million."

== Contributions to charitable and political organizations ==
Rajaratnam alongside other private donors, partnered with the US State Department to fund mine detection dogs for humanitarian demining war-affected areas in Sri Lanka. Rajaratnam was in Sri Lanka when the 2004 Asian Tsunami hit and donated $5 million to for the construction of 400 new homes for the island's various ethnic groups - Sinhalese and Tamils.

The Sri Lankan justice ministry has acknowledged and thanked Rajaratnam for the millions of dollars contributed to rehabilitating child soldiers conscripted by the Liberation Tigers of Tamil Eelam (LTTE). Rajaratnam had pledged a $1 million to rehabilitate former LTTE combatants.

According to the Federal Election Commission, Rajaratnam has made over $118,000 in political contributions in five years. He contributed to the Democratic National Committee and various campaigns on behalf of Barack Obama, Hillary Clinton, Chuck Schumer, and Bob Menendez.

== Post-prison activities ==
Rajaratnam served seven and a half years of an 11-year sentence in prison and was released in the summer of 2019. In December 2021, he published his memoir Uneven Justice detailing the events surrounding his conviction and his criticisms of the US criminal justice system.

Talking to Andrew Ross Sorkin of Squawk Box on CNBC TV Rajaratnam highlights and explains the details of strategies employed to achieve his conviction.

== See also ==
- SEC v. Rajaratnam
- Chip Skowron, hedge fund portfolio manager convicted of insider trading
- Mathew Martoma, hedge fund trader and portfolio manager convicted of insider trading
