= J. M. Rajaratnam =

Sri Lankan Tamil accountant and corporate executive (1927-2014)

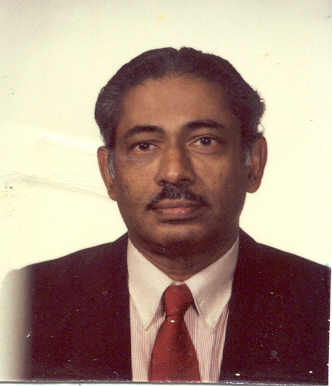
- Born: 23 December 1927; British Ceylon
- Died: 16 June 2014 (aged 86); New Jersey, USA
- Education: University of Ceylon
- Occupation: Accountant

Jesuthasan Mylvaganam Rajaratnam (23 December 1927 – 16 June 2014) was a Sri Lankan Tamil accountant and corporate executive.

== Early life and family ==
Rajaratnam was born on 23 December 1927. He was the son of A. J. Mylvaganam from Alvai near Point Pedro in northern Ceylon. He was educated at Hartley College and Jaffna Central College.

After school Rajaratnam joined the University of Ceylon, graduating with an honours degree in chemistry. He then went to study accountancy in the United Kingdom on a scholarship. He was elected president of the Ceylon Students Association (London) in 1956 and he was also the vice-president of the London Tamil Sangam which he helped establish. Thereafter he studied management accountancy in the United States, again on a scholarship. He was a fellow member (FCA) of the Institute of Chartered Accountants in England and Wales.

Rajaratnam married Rajeswari Muttucumaru. They had three sons (Rajakumaran, Rajakanthan and Rajarengan) and two daughters (Shanthini and Vathani).

== Career ==
Rajaratnam taught briefly at Jaffna Central College. Later he was appointed senior auditor at the accountancy firm Ford Rhodes, Thornton & Co and chief accountant at Brown & Co. He then joined the Singer Company as financial controller. He was chairman and CEO of Singer's operations in Ceylon in the 1970s before being promoted to Vice-President Asia Region for the Singer Company in 1976. During his time in Ceylon he helped establish numerous small businesses in the north of the country. He moved to the USA after being appointed Singer's Vice-President of Finance and Accounting.

After retirement Rajaratnam was involved in various philanthropic projects and was chairman of the Rajaratnam Charity Foundation. He was president of the Illankai Tamil Sangam of the USA, vice-president of the World Tamil Organisation and founding member of the Welfare & Human Rights Committee USA. He was also a consultant to the World Bank, member of the Roster of Experts on matters related to transnational corporations of the United Nations and a member of the US Executive Volunteer Service Corp.

Rajaratnam died on 16 June 2014 in New Jersey.
