= Barrington D. Parker Jr. =

American judge (born 1944)

Barrington Parker

Senior Judge of the United States Court of Appeals for the Second Circuit
- Incumbent
- Assumed office October 10, 2009

Judge of the United States Court of Appeals for the Second Circuit
- In office October 16, 2001 – October 10, 2009
- Appointed by: George W. Bush
- Preceded by: Ralph K. Winter Jr.
- Succeeded by: Susan L. Carney

Judge of the United States District Court for the Southern District of New York
- In office April 26, 1994 – October 18, 2001
- Appointed by: Bill Clinton
- Preceded by: Leonard B. Sand
- Succeeded by: Richard J. Holwell

Personal details
- Born: Barrington Daniels Parker Jr. August 21, 1944 (age 81); Washington, D.C., U.S.
- Education: Yale University (BA, LLB)

Barrington Daniels Parker Jr. (born August 21, 1944) is a senior United States circuit judge of the United States Court of Appeals for the Second Circuit.

== Background ==
Parker's father, Barrington Daniels Parker Sr., was a judge on the United States District Court for the District of Columbia, from 1969 to 1993.

Parker studied at Yale University, where he received a Bachelor of Arts degree in 1965. He received a Juris Doctor from Yale Law School in 1969. He serves on the Yale Corporation, the university's board of trustees. He also was a member of St. Elmo, a secret society at Yale.

== Career ==
He served as law clerk for Judge Aubrey E. Robinson Jr. on the United States District Court for the District of Columbia from 1969 to 1970. Parker had been in private practice as an attorney in New York City for 24 years, from 1970 to 1994. He was also a partner at Parker Auspitz Neesemann & Delehanty and Morrison & Foerster and an associate at Sullivan and Cromwell.

== Federal judicial service ==
On April 26, 1994, President Bill Clinton nominated Parker to serve as a United States district judge the United States District Court for the Southern District of New York, to a seat vacated by Judge Leonard B. Sand, who assumed senior status on July 1, 1993. He was confirmed on September 14, 1994 by voice vote. He received his commission on September 15, 1994. His service as a district judge was terminated on October 18, 2001 when he was elevated to the court of appeals.

Parker was initially nominated to that court by President George W. Bush on May 9, 2001, to fill a seat vacated by Judge Ralph K. Winter, who assumed senior status on September 30, 2000. However, the Democratic-controlled United States Senate returned Parker's nomination just a few months later without considering it. Bush renominated him, along with many other previously returned nominees, on September 4, 2001. This time, the Senate confirmed Parker's nomination a little over a month later, on October 11, 2001, by a 100–0 vote. He received his commission on October 16, 2001. He assumed senior status on October 10, 2009.

On July 9, 2019, Parker was part of a three-judge panel which ruled that President Donald Trump cannot block people from his Twitter account for being critical of him. Writing for the panel, Parker said that the president uses his Twitter account to make official announcements and actions, so that responses to it are protected by the First Amendment. The decision affirmed an earlier ruling by U.S. District Judge Naomi Reice Buchwald.

== Personal life ==
Parker is the son of Barrington D. Parker.

== See also ==
- List of African-American federal judges
- List of African-American jurists

Legal offices
Preceded by Leonard B. Sand	Judge of the United States District Court for the Southern District of New York; 1994–2001	Succeeded by Richard J. Holwell
Preceded by Ralph K. Winter Jr.	Judge of the United States Court of Appeals for the Second Circuit; 2001–2009	Succeeded by Susan L. Carney
