= Joon Kim =

American attorney (born 1971)

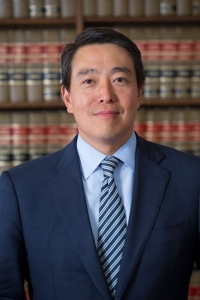

Acting United States Attorney for the Southern District of New York
- In office March 11, 2017 – January 3, 2018
- President: Donald Trump
- Preceded by: Preet Bharara
- Succeeded by: Geoffrey Berman

Personal details
- Born: May 26, 1971 (age 55) Los Angeles, California, U.S.
- Spouse: Mina Kim Yu
- Education: Stanford University (BA); Harvard University (JD)

- Joon Kim
- Hangul: 김준현
- Hanja: 金俊鉉
- RR: Gim Junhyeon
- MR: Kim Chunhyŏn

Joon Hyun Kim (born May 26, 1971) is an American attorney who served as the acting United States Attorney for the Southern District of New York from March 2017 to January 2018. He was Deputy United States Attorney for the Southern District of New York from July 2015 to March 2017 after serving as the chief of the criminal division since July 2014. From April 2013 to July 2014, Kim was the chief counsel to the U.S. Attorney. In March 2021, Kim was chosen by New York Attorney General Letitia James as independent counsel, along with Anne L. Clark, to co-lead the investigation into sexual harassment claims made against New York Governor Andrew Cuomo.

== Education and early career ==
Kim graduated from Phillips Exeter Academy in 1989. He then graduated from Stanford University in 1993 with membership in Phi Beta Kappa and graduated cum laude from Harvard Law School in 1996. After law school, he clerked for Miriam Goldman Cedarbaum of the Southern District of New York.

== Career ==
=== U.S. Attorney's office ===
Kim joined the U.S. Attorney's office for the Southern District of New York in 2000. As an assistant U.S. attorney, he investigated and prosecuted a wide range of federal crimes including racketeering, murder, money laundering, securities fraud, firearms and narcotics offenses, tax evasion, and terrorism. He spent his prior years in the office in the organized crime and terrorism unit, prosecuting violent organized crime syndicates, including Asian gangs and the Mafia.

During his tenure, Kim helped secure convictions of a number of high-ranking organized crime figures including Peter Gotti, boss of the Gambino Family, for conspiring to kill Salvatore "Sammy the Bull" Gravano.

=== Private practice ===
From 2006 to 2013, Kim worked at Cleary Gottlieb Steen & Hamilton LLP, where he was a partner in the litigation and enforcement group, focusing on white-collar criminal defense, regulatory enforcement, commercial civil litigation and international arbitration.

=== Return to the U.S. Attorney's office ===
Kim rejoined the United States Attorney's office for the Southern District of New York as chief counsel in April 2013. After becoming the chief of its criminal division in July 2014, he was promoted to Deputy U.S. Attorney in July 2015. When Preet Bharara was fired as U.S. Attorney in March 2017, Kim replaced him in an acting capacity, but had to be replaced in January 2018 because of a 300-day limit on acting U.S. attorneys. Kim's term was notable for the continued prosecution of high-profile terrorism cases, pursuing a prison term for Anthony Weiner following his guilty plea to a federal obscenity charge, and for securing the conviction of Mehmet Hakan Atilla, a Turkish banker, on fraud and conspiracy charges in a billion-dollar scheme to help Iran evade American financial sanctions via Turkish banks, despite an investigation of the American prosecutors by the government of Turkey.

On November 30, 2017, Kim announced the sentencing of Aharon Goldberg, Shimen Liebowitz and Binyamin Gottlieb, three organizers of the Kiryas Joel murder conspiracy who had tried to force an end to their intended victim's marriage under Jewish marital law.

=== Return to private practice ===
In April 2018, Kim returned as a partner at Cleary Gottlieb Steen & Hamilton LLP.

In coordination with the New York Office of Attorney General, Kim served as an independent investigator into the accusations of sexual assault and harassment against Governor Andrew Cuomo. The investigation ultimately led to Cuomo resigning from his position as Governor on August 10, 2021.

In December 2023, Kim was selected to conduct an independent investigation for the Special Review Committee of the Board of the Federal Deposit Insurance Corporation into allegations of harassment, discrimination, and workplace misconduct in the FDIC.

In October 2026, Kim joined the law firm of Wachtell, Lipton, Rosen & Katz as a partner.

== See also ==
- Federal prosecution of public corruption in the United States
- Korean Americans in New York City

Legal offices
Preceded by Preet Bharara	United States Attorney for the Southern District of New York; Acting; 2017–2018	Succeeded by Geoffrey Berman
