= Rajiv Goel =

American fraudster

- Citizenship: United States
- Education: The Wharton School
- Occupation: Financier
- Employer: Intel
- Title: Director of Strategic Investments, Intel Capital
- Criminal charges: securities fraud, conspiracy (October 16, 2009)
- Criminal penalty: Two years' probation

Rajiv Goel is a former American executive at Intel. He was a managing director in Intel's treasury department and a director of strategic investments at Intel Capital.

In 2009, he was arrested for insider trading with friend and hedge fund founder Raj Rajaratnam, in a sprawling US federal investigation centered on the Galleon Group. He pleaded guilty to securities fraud and conspiracy in February 2010. In 2011 he testified against Rajaratnam and in 2012 was sentenced to two years' probation.

Goel met Rajaratnam while they were both students at Wharton business school. He testified in the high-profile case U.S. v Rajaratnam against the hedge fund billionaire.
