= Valerie E. Caproni =

American judge (born 1955)

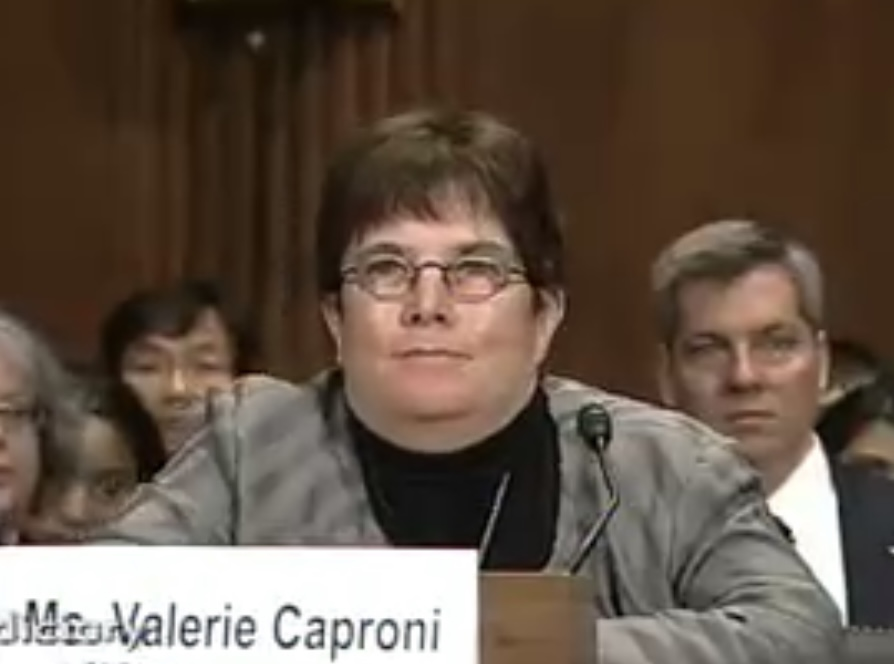

Senior Judge of the United States District Court for the Southern District of New York
- Incumbent
- Assumed office January 7, 2025

Judge of the United States District Court for the Southern District of New York
- In office December 2, 2013 – January 7, 2025
- Appointed by: Barack Obama
- Preceded by: Richard J. Holwell
- Succeeded by: vacant

Personal details
- Born: Valerie Elaine Caproni; August 13, 1955 (age 70) Lee County, Alabama, U.S.
- Education: H. Sophie Newcomb Memorial College (BA); University of Georgia (JD)

Valerie Elaine Caproni (born August 13, 1955) is a senior United States district judge of the United States District Court for the Southern District of New York.

== Early life and education ==
Caproni grew up in Columbus, Georgia, and attended Hardaway High School, graduating in the class of 1973. As a teenager, she also attended the Georgia Governor's Honors Program, a summer program for gifted children. Caproni received a Bachelor of Arts, magna cum laude, in psychology from Newcomb College of Tulane University in 1976. She earned her Juris Doctor, summa cum laude, from the University of Georgia School of Law in 1979. While in law school, she served on the Georgia Law Review, was the winner of the Russell and Talmadge Moot Court competitions and was inducted into Order of the Coif.

== Career ==
Following graduation, Caproni clerked for Judge Phyllis A. Kravitch, United States Court of Appeals for the Eleventh Circuit. In September 1980, she began work as an associate in the litigation department of Cravath, Swaine & Moore in New York City. In 1985, Caproni became an assistant United States attorney in the Criminal Division of the United States Attorney's Office, Eastern District of New York. In early 1989, she became general counsel of the New York State Urban Development Corporation (UDC). In that capacity, she supervised a legal staff of approximately 20 and was involved in many major economic development projects in New York, including the Times Square Redevelopment Project. Caproni returned to the United States Attorney's Office in 1992 after approximately three years away. She was chief of special prosecutions and chief of the Organized Crime and Racketeering Section before becoming chief of the Criminal Division in 1994. As chief of the Criminal Division, she supervised approximately 100 assistant U.S. attorneys until she departed in 1998, to become the regional director of the Pacific Regional Office of the Securities and Exchange Commission (SEC) based in San Francisco. At the SEC, Caproni oversaw the enforcement and regulatory programs of the SEC in the nine far western states, managing a staff of approximately 250 lawyers, accountants and examiners located in Los Angeles and San Francisco. While at the SEC, Caproni increased dramatically the cooperation between the SEC and federal prosecutors in order to maximize the impact of enforcement actions. In 2001 Caproni returned to New York as counsel at the law firm of Simpson Thacher & Bartlett, specializing in white collar criminal defense and SEC enforcement actions.

=== FBI appointment ===
In August 2003, FBI Director Robert Mueller named her general counsel of the FBI, succeeding Kenneth L. Wainstein. Caproni played a leading role in limiting the involvement of FBI officials in interrogations of Guantanamo captives when interrogators from other agencies used "enhanced interrogation techniques".

On April 14, 2010, after the Judiciary Subcommittee hearing on the "Report on the FBI's Use of Exigent Letters and Other Informal Requests for Telephone Records", House Judiciary Committee Chair John Conyers (D-Mich.) issued a statement calling upon FBI Director Mueller to take immediate action to punish and fire those in the FBI Office of General Counsel headed by Caproni, who had unlawfully used exigent letters and provided legal advice that was inconsistent with federal law.

Conyers's statement:

Today's hearing showed that the FBI broke the law on telephone records privacy and the General Counsel's Office, headed by Valerie Caproni, sanctioned it and must face consequences. I call upon FBI Director Mueller to take immediate action to punish those who violated the rules, including firing them from the agency. This must include the FBI Office of General Counsel, headed by Valerie Caproni, which the IG testified today had approved [the] continued use of exigent letters and provided legal advice that was inconsistent with federal law. Between 2003 and 2006, the FBI improperly obtained personal telephone record information from U.S. telephone companies for more than 5,500 phone numbers, including private details protected by federal law. The IG found that, during this period, much of this information was obtained through the use of so-called exigent letters, which do not exist in the Patriot Act and have no statutory basis whatsoever. In some cases agents sent letters with information known to be false."

=== Federal judicial service ===
On November 14, 2012, President Barack Obama nominated Caproni to serve as a United States District Judge of the United States District Court for the Southern District of New York, to fill the seat vacated by Judge Richard J. Holwell, who resigned in early 2012. On January 2, 2013, her nomination was returned to the President, due to the sine die adjournment of the Senate. On January 3, 2013, she was renominated to the same office. Her nomination was approved by a voice vote of the Senate Judiciary Committee on June 13, 2013. The Senate confirmed Caproni's nomination by a 73–24 vote on September 9, 2013. She received her commission on December 2, 2013. She assumed senior status on January 7, 2025. In 2026, she presided over the trial of the Alexander brothers who were on trial for sex trafficking.

Legal offices
Preceded by Richard J. Holwell	Judge of the United States District Court for the Southern District of New York; 2013–2025	Vacant
