= Jeremiah Palecek =

American artist

- Born: February 14, 1984 (age 42); Bismarck, North Dakota
- Known for: Painting

Jeremiah Palecek (1984) is an American artist. He grew up in Bismarck, North Dakota. He attended the Lyme Academy College of Fine Arts, The Glasgow School of Art and The School of the Art Institute of Chicago. He currently resides in Prague, Czech Republic.

Jeremiah's work as a painter is primarily known for rendering the digital world in oil paint. His subject matter includes but isn't limited to paintings of video games, television shows, and film stills. Boingboing.net, and Destructiod have featured his work. Jeremiah has also worked with Curators ranging from Mark Divo (Luxembourg), Jakub Hosek (Czech Republic) and Michael Rade (Germany).

He collaborated with Travis Jeppesen to produce the book Poems I Wrote While Watching TV for BLATT Books. In the book Jeremiah's paintings were a visual accompaniment to Jeppesen's sardonic poetry about watching television. Palecek has received more mainstream media attention for rendering YouTube video stills in oils. Appearing on Canal Television's L'Edition Speciale as well as in Wired magazine in Japan and the US, and NPR's radio program The Bryant Park Project. Palecek's art utilizes symbolism and imagery more common to the digital world and because the subjects are rendered in oils the viewer is forced to look at these images in a new way. In an interview for Print Magazine Clive Thompson wrote that "for Jeremiah Palecek, the computer screens of video games and software are the new landscapes."
