= Anil Kumar =

Indian-American management consultant

- Born: 1958 (age 67–68); Patna, Bihar, India
- Citizenship: United States
- Education: IIT Bombay; Imperial College London; University of Pennsylvania
- Occupations: Consultant, Management expert
- Employer: McKinsey & Company, Inc.
- Known for: Co-Founder of Indian School of Business; Knowledge Process Outsourcing; Business Process Outsourcing
- Spouse: Malvika
- Children: Shubham Kumar

Anil Kumar (born 1958) is an Indian-American former senior partner and director at management consulting firm McKinsey & Company, where he co-founded McKinsey's offices in Silicon Valley and India and created its Internet practice (representing a quarter of McKinsey's business at the time) among others. Kumar is additionally the co-founder of the Indian School of Business with Rajat Gupta and the creator of two different kinds of outsourcing. He graduated from IIT Bombay in India, Imperial College in the UK, and The Wharton School in the US.

In 2010, he pleaded guilty to insider trading in a dramatic "descent from the pinnacle of the business world." He was the government's first cooperator and most important witness "in two of the most important securities fraud trials in history" against close friends and business partners Raj Rajaratnam, the billionaire founder of the Galleon Group family of hedge funds, and Rajat Gupta, the former head of McKinsey and Company and a board member of Goldman Sachs and Procter and Gamble. Rajaratnam and Gupta were both convicted in separate high-profile criminal trials. He was sentenced in 2012 by Judge Denny Chin to two years of probation in exchange for testimony against Rajaratnam and Gupta. Chin stated that "greed wasn't the motive in [Kumar's] case" and that "this was aberrational conduct ... Mr. Kumar has led a law-abiding and productive life." Federal prosecutors called Kumar "one of the best and most important cooperating witnesses" they had ever worked with.

In 2015, an investigation noted that Mr. Kumar had illegally collected funds from insider trading in offshore accounts in the name of his domestic worker, Manju Das. The investigation alleged that Das had no knowledge of these accounts, which were created with identity documents falsified by Mr. Kumar; and that Mr. Kumar had paid Ms. Das far below minimum wage for several years in violation of US law.

== Early life and education ==
Kumar graduated first in his class from The Doon School, high school in India, and ranked among the top 100 students across India for admission to the competitive Indian Institute of Technology colleges. He graduated third in his class from IIT Bombay with a degree in mechanical engineering, writing a thesis on renewable energy. Kumar attended Imperial College at the University of London on "the equivalent of the Rhodes scholarship" sponsored by Cecil Rhodes's De Beers Company. He became the first student to complete Imperial's two-year course in applied mechanics in 10 months, and also graduated first in his class. Kumar attended business school at the Wharton School at the University of Pennsylvania with a self-designed major on the management of technology and international business.

== Career ==
Kumar was a "star senior partner," and "one of McKinsey’s most senior employees [and] brightest stars." He co-founded McKinsey's offices in Silicon Valley and India and created and led the firm's business in three different areas of Internet companies (representing 25-30% of McKinsey's worldwide revenues at its peak), outsourcing, and intrapreneurship. He was the protégé of former chief executive Rajat Gupta, though he was blamed for the collapse of McKinsey's e-commerce initiatives after the dot-com collapse and never ran in the elections for managing partner (chief executive). Gupta and Kumar also co-founded the Indian School of Business in Hyderabad, India.

=== McKinsey and Company ===
Kumar began his career at Hewlett Packard as a product manager before joining McKinsey and Company in 1986 as one of the earliest Indian-Americans at the consultancy. In 1988 he co-founded McKinsey's offices in Silicon Valley with a partner, growing the office "from two people to approximately 35" by 1992. In 1993 as a partner he founded McKinsey's office in New Delhi, which along with the Mumbai office co-founded the consultancy in India. In India he pioneered the concepts of Knowledge Process Outsourcing and Business Process Outsourcing and became the protégé of then-managing director (chief executive) Rajat Gupta. Kumar returned to the United States to found and lead McKinsey's Internet practice during the dot-com bubble. "Under [Kumar's] leadership, McKinsey's e-commerce practice grew to represent a full 25-30% of the firm's revenues," court documents revealed, though Kumar was blamed for the evaporation of this business in the subsequent dot-com collapse. He and Gupta briefly created a program to allow the firm to accept stock in lieu of consulting fees. Kumar was also Chairman of the Knowledge Center and Chairman of the Asia Center. He was a director and corporate officer of the firm. He lived and worked from multiple offices in New Delhi, New York, and Silicon Valley, traveling over thirty thousand miles a month.

He was a member of the Council on Foreign Relations and the Young Presidents' Organization, a founding charter member of TiE, and was the United States chairman of India's largest business lobby, the Confederation of Indian Industry.

Criticism of Kumar centered around his close relationship with Gupta and a perception of arrogance. According to The Financial Times, "the two operated as a forceful double-act to secure business for McKinsey, win access in Washington and build a brotherhood of donors around the Hyderabad-based ISB and a handful of social initiatives." Also according to the Times, "as much as Mr Kumar was admired for his business ability and sharpness, he also drew fire for what was seen as his arrogance."

== Galleon investigation ==
Kumar maintained an intentionally low profile outside McKinsey until an October 2009 arrest in conjunction with an ongoing and wide-ranging US governmental investigation into insider trading. Former mentor Rajat Gupta was later arrested by the FBI in a related case, prompting inquiries into McKinsey's senior leadership and business model.

As of December 2009, Kumar was no longer at the consultancy. In January 2010 he pleaded guilty to insider trading charges and was "the government’s star witness" in March 2011 against billionaire friend and Galleon Group founder Raj Rajaratnam (United States v. Rajaratnam). In the sprawling case his involvement was unusual; according to a Reuters blog, "He’s the only informant who could be considered even more successful than Raj was, at least professionally if not in terms of raw cash. Raj had money, more money than he really knew what to do with, but Kumar had much more societal acceptance and prestige." He settled with the SEC in May 2010 for $2.8 million, the amount after gains he received from Rajaratnam through a Swiss bank account in a domestic worker's name. Gupta, Rajaratnam, and Kumar were all close friends and had founded the $1.3-billion private equity firm New Silk Route together, though Rajaratnam and Kumar withdrew before the firm began operation.

Kumar was represented by the late Robert Morvillo, who had previously led billionaire Martha Stewart’s defense in her own insider trading case.

He testified again as "the Government's key witness" in the May 2012 criminal trial of former mentor Rajat Gupta (United States v. Gupta), where he described the relationships between Gupta, Rajaratnam and himself. To do so was difficult, according to federal prosecutors, "because [Kumar] knew that he could be partially responsible for helping to convict someone with whom he and his family had deep and long-lasting ties." Bloomberg commented, "When business guru Rajat Gupta and his protégé, Anil Kumar, worked together to expand management consultancy McKinsey & Co in the 1990s, a date in court years later surely was not part of the plan."

Both Rajaratnam and Gupta were ultimately convicted in separate high-profile criminal trials.

International media, business, and finance industry observers have analyzed extensively Kumar's actions in aiding Rajaratnam. Consensus remains divided on the precise motivators of money, respect, and relationship, with The New York Times asking, "Why would people who seem to have it all — wealth, prestige, powerful jobs and infinite access to others with the same — risk that, and more, to provide inside information to the Sri Lankan-born billionaire?". Rajaratnam's annual payments were estimated at less than 5% of Kumar's annual income (and just 1-2% excluding a one-time bonus), further raising the question of motivation. Prosecutors wondered "why an incredibly bright, highly accomplished, professional consultant, and senior partner at arguably the world’s leading consulting firm, who contributed considerable time to start the Indian School of Business and to other charities, would betray his profession’s core values." One media source questioned Kumar's sentencing report. Judge Chin would ultimately rule that "greed wasn't the motive in [Kumar's] case."

Federal prosecutors said "Kumar's testimony was nothing short of devastating. Kumar was credible, precise, and fully corroborated." In July 2012 he was sentenced by Judge Denny Chin to two years of probation, ending in July 2014.

== Education and non-profits ==
Kumar co-founded the Indian School of Business with Gupta in 1997. Court documents revealed he personally raised approximately 35% of all money donated to the school and kept a low profile as co-founder: "a large part of the intellectual vision of ISB is in fact Anil's, a point not many outside ISB's leadership will ever be aware of."

In New Delhi, Kumar helped IIT Delhi double its student body with no increase in costs and was a founding board member of the Bharti Foundation. In San Jose, he served on the boards of the Children's Discovery Museum and San Jose Civic Light Opera.

As of 2012, he was working with the Baylor College of Medicine and Max Healthcare to start a medical university, teaching hospital, and nursing school in India, and also with the Hero Group to start an 8000-person engineering college in India.

== Personal life ==
Kumar maintained an intentionally low public profile, and according to prosecutors was "earning significant amounts of money at McKinsey [though] lived relatively modestly, his assets far exceeded his liabilities." He lived and worked for decades in New Delhi, New York, and Silicon Valley, traveling over thirty thousand miles a month for McKinsey. He had a Manhattan apartment in the Time Warner Center and a house in Saratoga, California. He is married and has one son.

== See also ==
- Chip Skowron, hedge fund portfolio manager convicted of insider trading
- Mathew Martoma, hedge fund trader and portfolio manager convicted of insider trading
