= Robert Moffat (businessman) =

Robert "Bob" Moffat
- Born: 1956 (age 69–70)
- Education: Union College
- Occupation: Business executive
- Employer: International Business Machines Corporation (IBM)
- Title: Senior Vice President, Systems and Technology Group
- Criminal charges: securities fraud, conspiracy (October 16, 2009)
- Criminal penalty: six months jail
- Criminal status: served sentence
- Spouse: Amor
- Children: 4

Robert "Bob" Moffat (born 1956) was a senior executive at IBM, the senior vice president of its systems and technology group, and "widely considered" a candidate to be its next CEO. He graduated from Union College in Schenectady, New York.

In October 2009, he and five others were arrested for securities fraud and conspiracy as the first arrests in the wide-ranging Galleon Group insider trading investigation. He pleaded guilty and served six months in prison.

== Career ==
=== IBM ===
Moffat joined IBM in 1978 and was eventually mentored by Sam Palmisano, who would ultimately become the chief executive of IBM. According to Bloomberg, "the close ties between the two men became something of a joke among Moffat's staff." He rose to a senior position in the organization and was global head of supply chain, among other areas. While serving as Senior vice president, Integrated Operations, Moffat was ranked among the 50 Most Powerful People by Network World in 2006.

=== Galleon arrest ===
Moffat was arrested in 2009 on charges that he had shared confidential information with Danielle Chiesi, with whom he had begun an extramarital relationship in 2003.

According to Bloomberg, "Moffat said the stress of the case has exacerbated his wife’s multiple sclerosis. He said he has been ostracized by former friends and colleagues at IBM and lost $65 million in benefits he probably would have received had he stayed at the company."

== Personal ==
Moffat has at least four children and has lived in Minnesota, France, New York, Connecticut and North Carolina over a 30-year career with IBM.
