= Rengan Rajaratnam =

Sri Lankan-American hedge fund manager

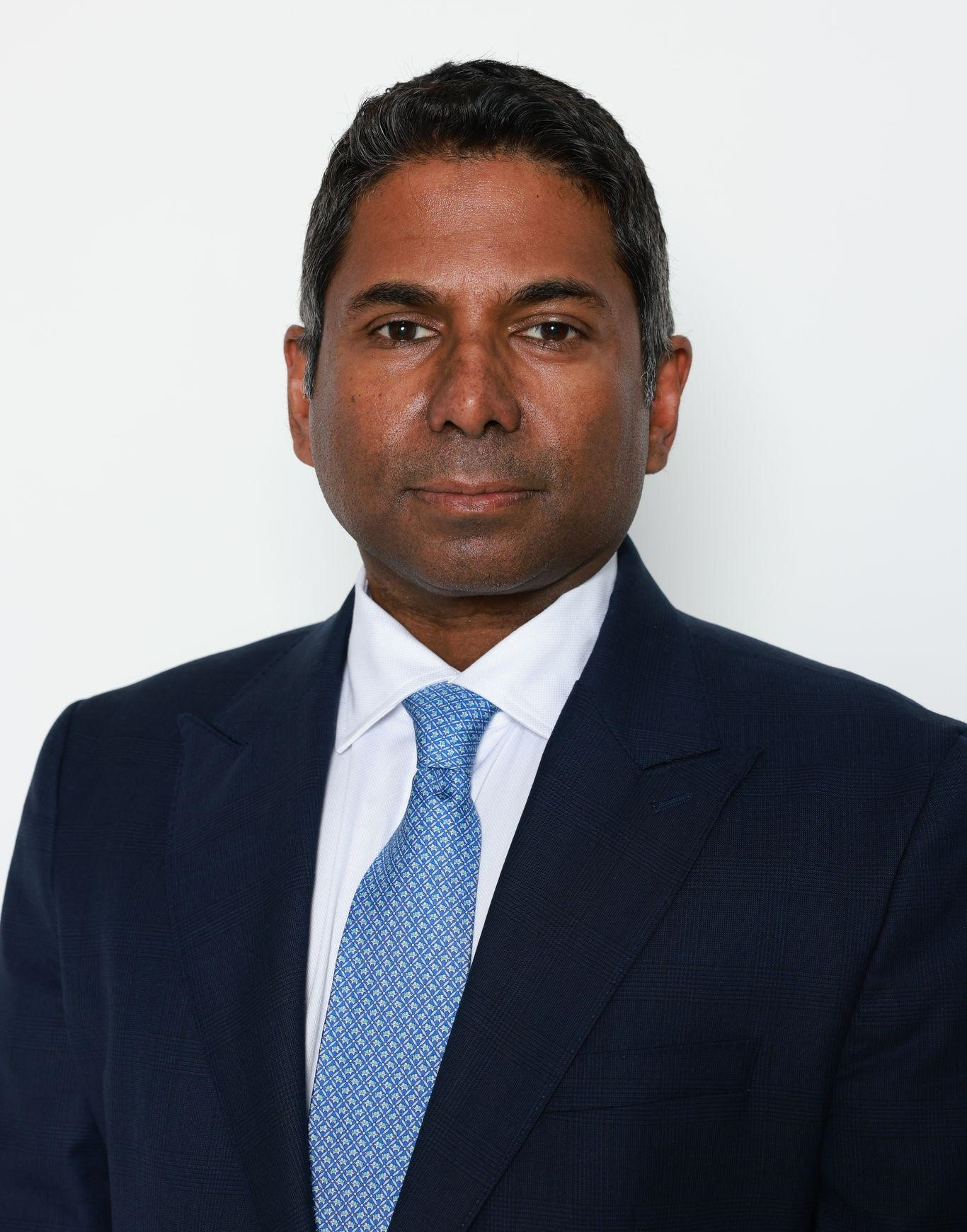
- Rengan in 2025
- Born: Rajarengan Rajaratnam; 1970 (age 55–56); Ceylon
- Education: University of Pennsylvania; Stanford University
- Occupations: Hedge fund manager Entrepreneur; Investor
- Years active: 2003-present
- Employer(s): Galleon Group; SAC Capital; Sedna Capital; Morgan Stanley
- Title: Portfolio Manager
- Relatives: Raj Rajaratnam (brother)

Rajarengan "Rengan" Rajaratnam (born 1970) is a Sri Lankan-American hedge fund manager and the founder of Sedna Capital. He is the younger brother of Raj Rajaratnam, former convicted billionaire hedge fund manager. In March 2013, Rengan was arrested for and charged with securities fraud in connection with alleged insider trading while working at Galleon Group. His trial in commenced in June 2014 in New York City. He was acquitted of all criminal charges by a jury the following month. Rengan has worked with the Mid-Atlantic Innocence Project as its treasurer and member of the executive committee. The project works to prevent and correct the convictions of innocent people.

== Early life and education ==
Rajaratnam was born in 1970 to a Tamil family in Sri Lanka. His father had raised himself from poverty and become a senior executive of a US company. Rengan moved a lot during his childhood, living in multiple countries including India, Singapore, Thailand and the United States. By age 12, Rengan was studying at a boarding school in the US. He attended the University of Pennsylvania and later graduated Stanford Graduate School of Business with an MBA in 1998.

== Career ==
=== Early career ===
After graduating from Pennsylvania, Rengan worked at Mercer Consulting and then Morgan Stanley. After completing his MBA at Stanford, he worked as a Mergers and Acquisitions banker at Robertson Stephens. Embracing the tech boom, he functioned as CEO of Artinsider.com, an online sales start-up. However, the company was subsequently sold in 2000 to Bruce McGaw Graphics.

=== Sedna and Galleon ===
After Artinsider.com was successfully sold, Rengan took a career break for travel and reflection. Returning to the US six months later, he was reportedly caught up in the timeline of 9/11, with all his interviews scheduled for that week being cancelled. As a result, he then joined his brother Raj's hedge fund, Galleon Group. At Galleon, Rengan ran a small-cap technology portfolio.

Rengan then joined S.A.C. Capital Advisors (now Point 72 Capital), a hedge fund group founded by Steven A. Cohen. Cohen is currently the owner of New York Mets of Major League Baseball. Rengan then started Sedna Capital in 2003 with an officemate from Galleon. The company received investment commitments for over US$50 million but ended up getting investments of only US$7 million. Operating from a cheap apartment, the company grew the fund to US$100 million in two years.

After Sedna, Rengan rejoined Galleon in 2007. By 2009, Rengan had left his brother's fund and focused on other initiatives, According to Rengan, his brother Raj continues to owe him pay worth US$13.5 million from his time at Galleon. Later, Rengan was involved in several other endeavours.

=== Mid-Atlantic Innocence Project ===
In 2016, Rengan joined the Mid-Atlantic Innocence Project (MAIP), a non-profit organisation focused on preventing and correcting wrongful convictions in Washington D.C., Maryland and Virginia. Initially, Rengan volunteered to screen cases, although MAIP does not typically use non-lawyers for this role. After two years, he was invited to join MAIP's board of directors. In 2019, he was elected Treasurer and Head of the Audit and Finance Committee, overseeing the organisation's financial management. In 2020, he joined MAIP's executive committee, contributing to its long-term strategic planning. Since its founding, MAIP has helped to secure the release or exoneration of over 40 individuals, with Rengan playing a role in the organisation's financial and operational oversight.

== Insider trading allegations ==
=== Background and Trial ===
Rengan was arrested in 2013 on insider trading charges. The Galleon Group insider trading investigation began with the investigation of Sedna Capital in 2003–2004. Rengan was living in Brazil at the time of the charges. He reportedly immediately volunteered to return to face charges and clear his name. The judge allowed jurors to hear about Rengan's decision to fly from Brazil to the US shortly after being indicted in 2013. The defence argued that this evidence showed Rengan knew he was innocent.

Prosecutors alleged that Rengan regularly shared confidential information with his brother, Raj Rajaratnam but he was cleared by a jury in July 2014.

During Raj Rajaratnam's trial, the jury heard Rengan call former classmate and McKinsey junior partner David Palecek "a little dirty" and "boasted that he [Palecek] 'finally spilled his beans' by sharing corporate secrets." According to Bloomberg, when asked about AMD, Palecek allegedly said "Buy it, buy as much as you can as soon as you can."

Rengan's own trial began before US District Court Judge Naomi Reice Buchwald in June 2014. He was "accused of trading on confidential information related to wireless broadband company Clearwire Corp. and chip maker Advanced Micro Devices Inc. in 2008" while at Galleon. He was said to have acted on information from his brother and profits from the trades were alleged to be about $800,000.

During the trial, Judge Buchwald ruled that there was insufficient evidence to support the key charge of conspiracy to commit insider trading. This was a significant decision because conspiracy charges are often central to insider trading prosecutions, as they allow prosecutors to tie defendants to broader schemes. During a hearing, Judge Buchwald stated that the two counts on the Clearwire stock purchase are based on a flawed legal premise. She stated that no reasonable jury could conclude that Rengan had engaged in insider trading in the stocks of Clearwire.

=== Not Guilty Verdict ===
All counts were thrown out due to insufficient evidence except for two counts for US$34,000. He was found not guilty in July 2014, after four hours of jury deliberation on the original six counts of the indictment for which he was tried. Rengan's not-guilt verdict broke the streak of Manhattan federal prosecutor Preet Bharara. Bharara had held a 85–0 record for straight convictions over five years prior to his loss to Rengan who was found not guilty.

Following his acquittal, jurors and legal experts criticised the strength of the government's case against Rengan. Speaking outside the courthouse, juror Miriam Godreich stated that the evidence was "so underwhelming that you couldn't convict," adding that the trial felt like an attempt to retry Raj Rajaratnam rather than focus on Rengan. The forewoman for the jury, Isabel Tirado, stated to media that "there was no evidence, period." Another juror, Catherine Wolcott, stated that Rengan did not engage in illegal trading like his brother Raj. She said "Raj kept his cards close to the vest. Rengan was sort of a puppy playing in the field, trying to get his attention." She also stated, “"We were waiting to hear more about Rengan, who was the actual person on trial. By the end, we were all like, 'Where's the evidence?'”

Legal scholars also questioned the prosecution's approach, with Thomas Lee Hazen, a professor at the University of North Carolina School of Law, noting that Judge Buchwald's decision to dismiss the two securities fraud counts before the verdict was a pivotal moment.Judge Buchwald ruled that prosecutors had failed to prove that Rengan knew the alleged insider tip had been exchanged for a benefit, calling some of their arguments "singularly unpersuasive." As a result, jurors were left to deliberate only on a conspiracy charge, on which they ultimately found him not guilty.

== Personal life ==
Rengan is married to Dr. Manisha Singal, a healthcare executive and physician based in Washington, DC and has one son. He has older brothers Raj and Rajakanthan and two sisters, Vathani and Shanthini. According to court documents, as of 2025, Rengan has not associated with his convicted brother Raj since 2011.
