= Richard J. Holwell =

American judge (born 1946)

Richard James Holwell

Judge of the United States District Court for the Southern District of New York
- In office September 22, 2003 – February 7, 2012
- Appointed by: George W. Bush
- Preceded by: Barrington D. Parker Jr.
- Succeeded by: Valerie E. Caproni

Personal details
- Born: Richard James Holwell; 1946 (age 79–80) New York City, New York, U.S.
- Education: Villanova University (BA); Columbia University (JD)

Richard James Holwell (born 1946) is a former United States district judge of the United States District Court for the Southern District of New York. Holwell resigned from the bench on February 7, 2012.

== Education and career ==
Born in New York City, New York, Holwell received a Bachelor of Arts degree from Villanova University in 1967 and a Juris Doctor from Columbia University School of Law in 1970. He graduated from Cambridge University School of Criminology in 1971. He was in private practice of law in New York City, from 1971 to 2003, becoming a partner at White & Case LLP. There, his practice concentrated on securities, antitrust, bankruptcy and financial-market matters, as well as civil and criminal investigations before the Securities and Exchange Commission, Justice Department and Federal Trade Commission. Holwell also represented former New York governor George Pataki in a case that upheld the governor's authority to remove a district attorney who opposed the death penalty.

== Federal judicial service ==
On August 1, 2002, Holwell was nominated by President George W. Bush to a seat on the United States District Court for the Southern District of New York, vacated by Barrington D. Parker Jr. The initial nomination having not succeeded, Holwell was renominated for the position on January 7, 2003, and was confirmed by the United States Senate on September 17, 2003, after the White House and New York senator Charles Schumer resolved a long-running feud over the selection process for New York judges. Holwell received his commission on September 22, 2003. On February 7, 2012, Holwell resigned from the bench to found Holwell Shuster & Goldberg LLP, a boutique commercial litigation firm, with two former Kasowitz Benson Torres & Friedman LLP partners.

== Noteworthy cases ==
- In August 2008, Holwell granted habeas corpus relief to a prisoner with a history of mental illness who had served nine years in prison for stealing eight dollars. Holwell ruled that a New York state court violated the prisoner's due process rights when it refused to allow him to contest a social worker's conclusion that he was competent to stand trial.
- In April 2008, Holwell ruled that New York City could lawfully require fast food restaurants to post calorie information on their menus.
- In March 2007, Holwell issued an opinion on the res judicata effects of U.S. class action judgments in jurisdictions outside the U.S., ruling that certain European plaintiffs could join a shareholder lawsuit against Vivendi that asserted claims under U.S. law.
- In January 2004, Holwell ordered the federal Bureau of Prisons to reconsider a policy that precluded a prisoner from being assigned to a halfway house until 90% of his sentence was served.

Legal offices
Preceded by Barrington D. Parker Jr.	Judge of the United States District Court for the Southern District of New York; 2003–2012	Succeeded by Valerie E. Caproni
