= Galleon Group =

American hedge fund caught insider trading (1997–2009)

The Galleon Group
- Industry: Investment management
- Founded: 1997
- Founder: Raj Rajaratnam; Ari Arjavalingam; Gary Rosenbach; Krishen Sud
- Defunct: October 21, 2009
- Headquarters: New York City, U.S.
- Key people: Raj Rajaratnam (investing); Gary Rosenbach (trading)
- Products: Hedge fund
- AUM: over $7 billion (peak)
- Website: www.galleongrp.com

The Galleon Group was one of the largest hedge fund management firms in the world, managing over $7 billion, before closing in October 2009. The firm was the epicenter of a 2009 insider trading scandal which subsequently led to its fall.

The firm was founded by Ari Arjavalingam, Gary Rosenbach, Krishen Sud, and Raj Rajaratnam, a former equity research analyst and eventual president of Needham & Company, in 1997. The New York headquartered firm was named for the galleon, a large sailing ship used from the 16th to 18th centuries by European traders and explorers, especially from Spain.

The rise and fall of Galleon has been the subject of a number of books including The Billionaire's Apprentice (by Anita Raghavan, a journalist with The Wall Street Journal).

== History ==
While working for Needham & Company, Rajaratnam started a hedge fund at the company's request—the Needham Emerging Growth Partnership—in March 1992. He later bought and renamed it Galleon. The fund primarily invested in technology and healthcare companies and quickly increased in value, eventually peaking at $7 billion in 2008.

== Insider trading investigation ==
In October 2009 Rajaratnam and five others were arrested and charged with multiple counts of fraud and insider trading. Rajaratnam pleaded not guilty and remained free on $100 million bail, the largest in United States history. He was indicted by a grand jury in December 2009 and found guilty in U.S. District Court on 14 charges in May 2011. He was sentenced by U.S. District Judge Richard Holwell to 11 years in prison on October 13, 2011.

Other former and current traders at Galleon were subsequently arrested and charged with contributing to the alleged conspiracy. Several former employees of the firm cooperated in the investigation. As of January 2012 over 50 people had been convicted or pleaded guilty in the sprawling probe stemming from Galleon (not all of them Galleon employees).

Zvi Goffer, a former Galleon trader, was found guilty of all 14 counts of conspiracy and securities fraud against him and sentenced by Judge Sullivan "to 10 years in prison for his role in a scheme to trade on inside information provided by lawyers". Goffer had asked for a lenient sentence and prosecutors had recommended more than 10 years.

Adam Smith, a former Galleon trader, pleaded guilty and cooperated in the criminal trial of Raj Rajaratnam. He was sentenced in June 2012 to only a period of probation and no jail time by Judge Jed Rakoff, who took over the case from Judge Richard Holwell when the latter retired from the bench.

David R. Slaine, a former Galleon trader, who had previously been a portfolio manager at the hedge fund Chelsey Capital, and, prior, a trader at Morgan Stanley, was sentenced to three years' probation in January 2012, having provided vital assistance to the government as an FBI informant, since 2007.

Testimony during the trial of illegal inside source Rajat Gupta revealed further detail of how insider trading was pervasive at Galleon. Leon Shaulov, a Senior Portfolio Manager who was left out of one particular insider trading scheme, was livid when he found out – not because the company was breaking the law, but rather because he had been left out, sending internal emails complaining: "Thx for the heads up"; "Not one word from anyone. Thanks very much. All I get is sick dilution."; "What I give vs what I get back is disgusting." Shaulov went on to found Maplelane Capital.

== Aftermath ==
The SEC investigated Galleon for insider trading. This was followed by public court hearings of 2 months (for Raj Rajarathnam) and immediately after Raj's conviction, of 1 month (for Rajat Gupta). This led to the fund's closure and its directors going to jail for 2 to 10 years. Rajat Gupta was convicted in 2012 for his role and served 2 years in jail. Rajarathnam served an 8 year sentence on his original 11-year prison sentence and was released in 2019. Anil Kumar pleaded guilty to all charges and confessed in court about the role he had played.

== See also ==
- SEC v. Rajaratnam
