= Menezes =

Menezes, sometimes Meneses, was originally a Portuguese toponymic surname which originated in Montes Torozos, a region in Tierra de Campos, northeast of Valladolid and southeast of Palencia. The ancestor of the Meneses lineage was Tello Pérez de Meneses. The family wealth and power grew remarkably in the 13th and 14th centuries, through several marriages with the Castilian and Portuguese royal families.

As a surname, Menezes/Meneses may refer to:

== People ==
- Alex Meneses, United States actress and model
- Alexandre Menezes, Brazilian guitarist
- Alfred Menezes, Canadian cryptographer
- Ana Lúcia Menezes, Brazilian voice actress
- Antonio Martínez de Meneses (c. 1612–1661), Spanish playwright
- Antônio Meneses (born 1957), Brazilian cellist
- Armando Menezes (1902–1983), Goan poet, writer, academic and civil servant
- Artur Menezes (born 1997), Brazilian blues and blues rock guitarist, singer and songwriter
- Bernardino Meneses y Bracamonte, Count of Peñalba, Spanish nobleman and military leader
- Buwi Meneses, Filipino musician
- Christianne Meneses Jacobs, United States writer, editor, and teacher
- Daiana Menezes (born 1987), Brazilian actress, model and television host
- Diego Meneses (born 1998), Colombian para-athlete
- Fernão Teles de Meneses, Portuguese fidalgo and soldier
- Filipe Ribeiro de Meneses, Portuguese historian
- Francisco Meneses Osorio, Spanish painter
- Frutos Saavedra Meneses, Spanish soldier, geodesist and politician
- Geo Meneses, Mexican singer and producer
- Gloria Meneses (1910–1996), Uruguayan performer and activist
- Glória Menezes (1934–2026), Brazilian actress
- Gonzalo de Céspedes y Meneses, Spanish novelist
- Guillermo Meneses, Venezuelan writer
- Heloísa Pinheiro (born Heloísa Eneida Menezes Paes Pinto), Brazilian real-life "Girl from Ipanema"
- Herbert Meneses, Guatemalan actor
- Holdemar Menezes, Brazilian writer
- Icarius De Menezes, Brazilian creative director
- Ivan Menezes, Indian-born American/British business executive
- Janis Meneses, Chilean constituent
- Jean Charles de Menezes, Brazilian killed by London police officers who mistook him for a terrorist
- João Cardoso de Meneses e Sousa, Baron of Paranapiacaba (1827–1915), Brazilian poet, translator, journalist, lawyer and politician
- João Costa Menezes, Portuguese actor and filmmaker
- Joana Josefa de Meneses, Portuguese writer
- Jorge de Menezes, Portuguese explorer
- Laura Meneses, first Latin American in 1920 to be accepted into Radcliffe College, the women's educational institution affiliated with Harvard University
- Luís de Meneses, 2nd Viscount of Meneses, Portuguese artist
- Luís de Menezes Bragança (1878–1938), Indian journalist, writer, politician and anti-colonial activist
- Luiz Alberto Dias Menezes, Brazilian geologist, mineralogist and mineral dealer
- Mai Meneses, Spanish singer-songwriter
- Manuel Menezes, Indian business executive, chairman of the Indian Railway Board
- María Elena Meneses Rocha, Mexican journalist
- Maria Emilia Menezes, Indian industrialist
- Mario Menezes, Indian director, triatist and vice president of Tiatr Academy Goa
- Margareth Menezes, Brazilian singer
- Monsueto Menezes, Brazilian sambista, singer, composer and drummer
- Paulo Barreto Menezes (1925–2016), Brazilian civil engineer and politician
- Philadelpho Menezes, Brazilian poet, visual poet, pioneer of new media poetry
- Porfirio Meneses Lazón, Peruvian poet
- Ricardo Meneses, Portuguese actor
- Simone Menezes, Brazilian conductor
- Tobias Barreto de Meneses (1839–1889), Brazilian critic, poet, jurist
- Tyler Menezes, Canadian-American computer programmer and businessperson
- Victor Menezes (1947–2025), Indian banker
- Vidaluz Meneses (1944–2016), Nicaraguan librarian, poet, dean, and social activist

=== Politics ===
- Alfonso Téllez de Meneses el Viejo, nobleman and participant in the key Reconquista Battle of Las Navas de Tolosa
- António de Amaral de Meneses, 19th and last Governor of Portuguese Ceylon
- António Luís de Meneses, 1st Marquis of Marialva (1596–1675), Portuguese general in the Portuguese Restoration War
- António José Manoel de Menezes Severim de Noronha, 1st Duke of Terceira (1792–1860), Portuguese soldier and statesman
- António José Teles de Meneses, Governor of Portuguese Timor
- Apolonio Méndez Meneses, Mexican politician
- Aristide Menezes, political figure in Guinea-Bissau
- Beatriz de Meneses, 2nd Countess of Loulé, Portuguese noble
- Beatriz de Menezes, 2nd Countess of Vila Real, Portuguese noble
- Carlos Alberto Menezes Direito, Brazilian judge of the Supreme Federal Court
- Duarte de Menezes (1488–1539), Portuguese nobleman and colonial officer
- Duarte de Menezes, 3rd Count of Viana (1414–1464), Portuguese nobleman and military figure
- Fernando de Magalhães e Menezes, Portuguese colonial administrator and Chief of Staff in 1891
- Fernando de Meneses, 2nd Count of Ericeira, Portuguese nobleman and military man. He was Governor of Tangier until 1661
- Fradique de Menezes, Former President of São Tomé and Príncipe
- Francisco Barreto de Meneses, Portuguese governor
- Francisco de Meneses, 3rd Governor of Portuguese Ceylon
- Francisco de Meneses Brito, Spanish Governor of Chile
- Henrique de Meneses, Portuguese governor
- Henrique de Meneses, 3rd Marquis of Louriçal, Portuguese nobleman
- Jacquie Menezes, Canadian politician
- João Afonso Telo, 4th Count of Barcelos (died 1381), Portuguese nobleman
- João Afonso Telo de Meneses, 2nd Lord of Albuquerque, Portuguese nobleman
- João Rodrigues de Sá e Menezes (16th century), first Count of Penaguião, a Portuguese title
- Jorge de Meneses Baroche, 6th Captain-major of Portuguese Ceylon
- José António de Melo da Silva César e Meneses, high noble and general in the Portuguese Army
- José Guedes de Carvalho e Meneses, Portuguese colonial administrator
- José Manuel da Cunha Faro Menezes Portugal da Gama Carneiro e Sousa (1788–1849), Portuguese count and Prime Minister
- Julião Menezes, Indian freedom fighter, medical practitioner, author, and nationalist leader
- Leonor de Castro Mello y Meneses (1512–1546), Portuguese noble and court official, the IVth Duchess of Gandia
- Leonor Telles de Meneses, Queen Consort of Portugal
- Luís Filipe Menezes, Portuguese politician
- Luís de Meneses, 3rd Count of Ericeira, Portuguese nobleman
- Manuel de Menezes, Duke of Vila Real (16th century), Portuguese Governor of Ceuta
- Infanta Maria, Lady of Menezes and Orduña, Portuguese noble
- Mark Menezes, American lawyer and Under Secretary of Energy
- Martha Patricia Meneses Zavaleta, Primera Dama Municipio de Benito Juarez, Cancún, Quintana Roo, México
- Martim Afonso Telo de Meneses, Portuguese nobleman
- Omar Fayad Meneses, Mexican politician
- Pedro de Meneses, 1st Count of Vila Real (1370–1437), Portuguese nobleman and military figure
- Rodrigo Anes de Sá Almeida e Meneses, 1st Marquis of Abrantes, Portuguese nobleman and diplomat
- Dom Roque Tello de Menezes, Portuguese nobleman
- Roxana Miranda Meneses, Chilean politician
- Sebastião Lopes de Calheiros e Meneses, Portuguese colonial administrator
- Vasco Guedes de Carvalho e Meneses, Portuguese colonial administrator

=== Religion ===
- Aleixo de Menezes, Portuguese Archbishop of Braga
- Beatrice of Silva Menezes, Saint (1424–1492), Spanish nobleman, foundress of the Order of the Immaculate Conception of Our Lady
- José Ángel Saiz Meneses, Spanish prelate of the Catholic Church who has served as the metropolitan archbishop of Seville since 2021
- Juan Francisco Meneses, Chilean priest and political figure
- Juan González Meneses, Roman Catholic prelate who served as the Bishop of Almería
- María Romero Meneses, Nicaraguan nun
- Mary Noel Menezes, Guyanese Roman Catholic nun and historian
- Rozario Menezes, Roman Catholic Bishop of Lae, Papua New Guinea
- Tello Téllez de Meneses, bishop of Palencia

=== Sports ===
- Agdon Menezes, Brazilian football forward
- Alex Paulo Menezes Santana, known as Alex Santana, Brazilian footballer
- Ademir Marques de Menezes, Brazilian footballer
- Andréa Menezes, Brazilian tennis player
- Ângelo Meneses, Portuguese footballer
- António Menezes, Portuguese sailor
- António de Menezes, Portuguese fencer
- Benedicto de Moraes Menezes, Brazilian football player
- Bia Menezes, Brazilian footballer
- Bruno Marques Menezes, Brazilian footballer
- Bruno Menezes, Brazilian footballer
- Bruno Menezes Soares, also known as Bruno Mineiro, Brazilian football striker
- Carlos Menezes, Peruvian boxer
- Carlos de Menezes Júnior, Brazilian professional footballer
- Cecília Menezes, Brazilian indoor volleyball player
- Christopher Meneses (born 1990), Costa Rican footballer
- Claudio Meneses, Chilean footballer
- Daiane Menezes Rodrigues, Brazilian footballer
- Daiane Menezes Rodrigues (Bagé), Brazilian footballer
- Daltro Menezes, Brazilian football manager
- Débora Menezes, Brazilian taekwondo pratictioner
- Diego Salgado Costa de Menezes, Brazilian footballer
- Eduardo Menezes, Brazilian Olympic show jumping rider
- Eloy de Menezes, Brazilian equestrian
- Enilton Menezes de Miranda, Brazilian footballer
- Erik Jorgens de Menezes, Brazilian-born Emirati footballer
- Esteban Meneses, Argentine rugby union coach
- Felipe Menezes, Brazilian professional footballer
- Fernando Meneses, Chilean footballer
- Francisco Jackson Menezes da Costa, known as Jackson Caucaia, Brazilian footballer
- Frederika Menezes, Goan author, poet and artist
- Gledson da Silva Menezes, Brazilian football defender
- Gustavo Menezes, American racing driver
- Harlei de Menezes Silva, Brazilian goalkeeper
- Helena de Menezes, Brazilian sprinter
- Henry Menezes, Indian football manager
- Igor Caetano Menezes Trindade, Brazilian football player
- Jady Menezes, Brazilian kickboxer
- Jean Meneses, Chilean footballer
- Jeferson Lima de Menezes, known as Gauchinho, Brazilian footballer
- Jeimes Menezes de Almeida, Brazilian footballer
- Jessenia Meneses, Colombian cyclist
- João Menezes (born 1996), Brazilian tennis player
- Joey Meneses (born 1992), Mexican baseball player
- John Meneses (born 1984), Colombian footballer
- José Clayton Menezes Ribeiro, Brazilian-Tunisian footballer
- José Meneses, Guatemalan sprinter
- José Meneses (basketball), Mexican basketball player
- Jude Menezes, Indian field hockey goalkeeper
- Luis Rodolfo López Meneses, Guatemalan footballer
- Luís Vinícius de Menezes, Brazilian footballer
- Luiz Antonio "Mano" Venker Menezes, Brazilian football manager
- Matheus Menezes, Brazilian footballer
- Paulo Menezes (footballer) (born 1982), footballer from Brazil
- Paulo Menezes (football coach) (born 1978), Portuguese football manager
- Luís Cardoso de Menezes, Portuguese equestrian
- Luiz Henrique Ferreira de Menezes, Brazilian former footballer
- Luiz Felipe Costa Meneses, Brazilian football player
- Luís Maia de Bittencourt Menezes, Brazilian former footballer
- Marcos Antonio Menezes Godoi, Brazilian football player
- Óscar Meneses, Chilean football manager
- Oscar Meneses (athlete), Guatemalan sprinter
- Osman Menezes Venâncio Júnior, Brazilian footballer
- Marcela Menezes, Brazilian group rhythmic gymnast
- Matías Meneses, Chilean footballer
- Mauro Menezes, former professional tennis player from Brazil
- Paulo Victor de Menezes Melo, also known as Paulinho, Brazilian footballer
- Ramon Menezes, Brazilian football manager
- Ramon Menezes Roma, Brazilian footballer
- Ria Meneses, Filipino volleyball player
- Rildo da Costa Menezes, Brazilian footballer
- Rodrigo Menezes, Brazilian footballer
- Ronald Menezes, Brazilian freestyle swimmer
- Sarah Menezes, Brazilian judoka
- Sérgio Menezes, Brazilian sprinter
- Sherwin Meneses, Filipino volleyball coach
- Taiberson Ruan Menezes Nunes, Brazilian footballer
- Thaísa Menezes, Brazilian volleyball player
- Thiago dos Santos Menezes, Brazilian footballer
- Tony Menezes, Canadian-Brazilian footballer
- Valeska Menezes, Brazilian volleyball player
- Vergel Meneses, Filipino basketball player
- Vilson Xavier de Menezes Júnior, Brazilian footballer
- Wallace Menezes dos Santos, Brazilian footballer
- Yadir Meneses, Colombian footballer
- Yasmin Menezes, Brazilian female acrobatic gymnast
- Yulitza Meneses, Cuban sprint canoeist
- William Menezes, Brazilian football goalkeeper
- William Douglas Menezes, Brazilian footballer
- Wilson Meneses, Colombian cyclist

== See also ==
- Bezerra de Menezes: O Diário de um Espírito, Brazilian movie
- Colonel Luis Arturo Rodríguez Meneses Air Base, Colombian military air base
- Hospital Ayres de Menezes, main hospital in the capital city of São Tomé in São Tomé and Príncipe
- Institute Menezes Braganza, cultural institution in Goa
- Meneses de Campos, municipality in Spain
- MQV (Menezes-Qu-Vanstone), cryptographic protocol
- Orlando Bezerra de Menezes Airport, airport serving Juazeiro do Norte, Brazil. It is named after a local politician and entrepreneur.
