= Antonio Martínez =

Antonio Martínez may refer to:

== Arts and entertainment ==
- Antonio Martínez de Meneses (c. 1612–1661), playwright of the Spanish Golden Age
- Antonio Martínez Sarrión (born 1939), Spanish poet and translator
- Antonio Alonso Martinez (born 1963), Spanish/Portuguese painter
- Antonio Martínez Menchén (1930–2022), Spanish writer
- Antonio Martínez Ron (born 1976), Spanish journalist and scientific reporter

== Politics ==
- Antonio José Martínez (1793–1867), New Mexican priest, educator and politician
- Antonio María Martínez (died 1823), governor of Spanish Texas
- Antonio Martínez Aneiros (1933–2026), Spanish politician
- Antonio Martínez Luna, attorney general of the Mexican state of Baja California
- Antonio Martínez Rodríguez (born 1980), Spanish politician

== Sports ==
- Antonio Martínez (basketball) (1926–2016), Filipino basketball player
- Antonio Martínez (footballer, born 1977), Mexican football midfielder
- Antonio Martínez (footballer, born 1990), Spanish football midfielder
- Toni Martínez (born 1997), Spanish football forward

== Others ==
- T.J. Martinez (1970–2014), American Jesuit priest
