= Rajat Gupta =

Indian-American business executive (born 1948)

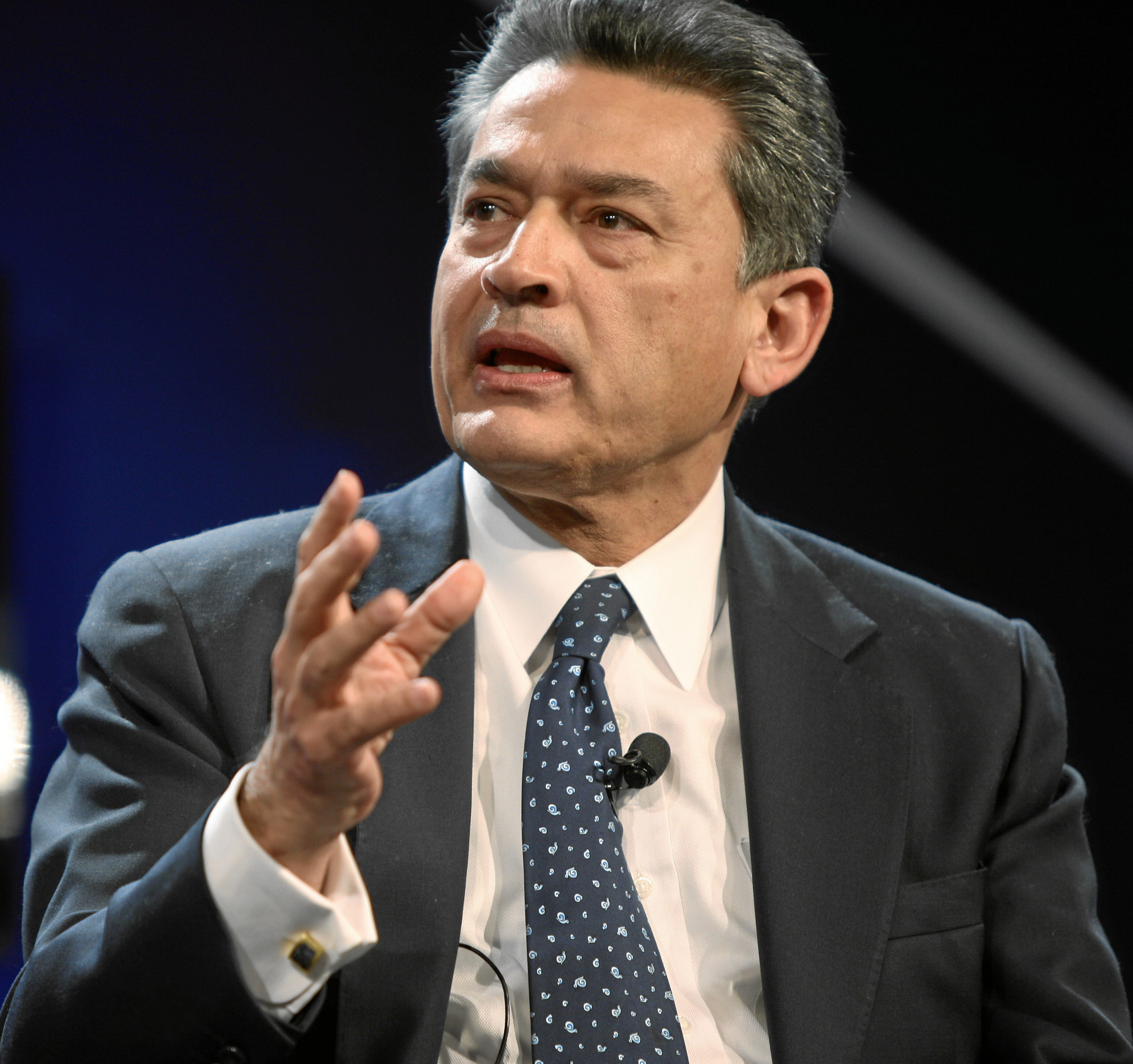
- Gupta in 2010
- Born: Rajat Kumar Gupta; December 2, 1948 (age 77); Calcutta, India (now Kolkata)
- Education: IIT Delhi (BTech); Harvard University (MBA)
- Employer: McKinsey & Company
- Title: Senior partner emeritus, former global managing director
- Criminal charges: Conspiracy (one count); Securities fraud (three counts)
- Criminal penalty: Two years imprisonment; $5 million fine
- Criminal status: Convicted
- Spouse: Anita Mattoo
- Children: 4

Rajat Kumar Gupta (Bengali pronunciation: [ɾɔdʒɔt kumaɾ ɡuptɔ]; born December 2, 1948) is an Indian-American business executive who, as CEO, was the first foreign-born managing director of management consultancy firm McKinsey & Company from 1994 to 2003. In 2012, he was convicted of insider trading and spent two years in prison. Gupta was a board member of corporations including Goldman Sachs, Procter & Gamble and American Airlines, as well as an advisor to non-profit organizations such as the Bill & Melinda Gates Foundation and The Global Fund to Fight AIDS, Tuberculosis and Malaria. He is the co-founder of the Indian School of Business, American India Foundation, New Silk Route and Scandent Solutions.

Gupta was convicted in June 2012 of four criminal felony counts of conspiracy and securities fraud in the Galleon scandal. He was sentenced in October 2012 to two years in prison, an additional year on supervised release and ordered to pay $5 million in fines. His conviction was upheld by a Federal Appeals Court on 25 March 2014. He then lodged an appeal of his conviction with the U.S. Supreme Court which was subsequently upheld in April 2015. An application to remain free until the court determined whether it would hear the appeal was denied in June 2014, leaving Gupta having to commence his two-year prison term that month. He was released on monitored house arrest in January 2016 and from house arrest in March 2016.

== Early life and education ==
Rajat Gupta was born in Calcutta, India, to a Bengali father Ashwini Gupta and a Punjabi mother Pran Kumari. His father was a journalist for Ananda Publishers and a professor in Calcutta's Ripon College prior to that. His mother taught at a Montessori school. Gupta has 3 siblings.

When Gupta was five the family moved to New Delhi, where his father went to start the Delhi-edition of the newspaper Hindustan Standard. Gupta's father died when Gupta was sixteen and his mother died two years later. Now orphans, Gupta and his siblings "decided to live by ourselves. It was pretty unusual in those days."

He was a student at Modern School in New Delhi. After high school, Gupta ranked 15th in the nation in the entrance exam for the Indian Institutes of Technology, IIT JEE. He received a Bachelor of Technology degree in Mechanical Engineering from IIT Delhi in 1971. His economics professor at IIT Delhi was Subramanian Swamy, who wrote his recommendation letter when he applied for Harvard Business School. Declining a job from the prestigious domestic firm ITC Limited, he received an MBA from Harvard Business School in 1973. Gupta graduated with distinction as a Baker Scholar. Gupta remarked that the first time he saw an airplane was when he flew to ITC at their request to inform them he would be attending Harvard.

== Career ==
=== McKinsey & Company ===
Gupta joined McKinsey & Company in 1973 as one of the earliest Indian Americans at the consultancy. He was initially rejected because of inadequate work experience, a decision that was overturned after his Harvard Business School professor Walter J. Salmon called Ron Daniel, then head of the New York office and later also the managing director of McKinsey, wrote on Gupta's behalf.

Gupta's mentors at McKinsey included Ron Daniel, the former managing director who as senior partner first hired Gupta into the New York office, and Anupam (Tino) Puri, the first Indian at the firm and eventual senior partner. He, in turn, mentored Anil Kumar as another early Indian-American at the consultancy. Gupta and Kumar "were the face of McKinsey in India". According to the Financial Times, "the two operated as a forceful double-act to secure business for McKinsey, win access in Washington and build a brotherhood of donors around the Hyderabad-based ISB and a handful of social initiatives."

Gupta began his career in New York before moving to Scandinavia to become the head of McKinsey offices in 1981. He did well in what was then considered a "backwater" area; this is where he first made his mark. Elected senior partner in 1984, he became head of the Chicago office in 1990.

In 1994 he was elected the firm's first managing director (chief executive) born outside of the US, and then re-elected twice in 1997 and 2000. Gupta is widely regarded as one of the first Indians to successfully break through the glass ceiling, as the first Indian-born CEO of a multinational corporation (not just a consultancy). During Gupta's time as head of McKinsey, the firm opened offices in 23 new countries and doubled its consultant base to 891 partners, increasing revenue 280 percent to $3.4 billion. His annual salary was estimated at US$5–10 million.

However Gupta's tenure was marked by controversy. When Gupta joined McKinsey, it was a small partnership run according to the high standards of its early leader, Marvin Bower, but by the time Gupta became managing director, McKinsey was under pressure from an increasingly competitive market, and Gupta's expansion efforts were said to have watered down McKinsey's vaunted principles. Enron, closely identified with McKinsey, collapsed during his time as managing director. During the dot-com bubble he and Anil Kumar created a program for McKinsey to accept payment from its clients in stock. Gupta's accountability for the shifting of standards was weighed differently by different observers, and some defended him noting that the managing director's job was like trying to "herd cats"; Gupta himself described it as "a sort of servant-leader job", with "at least 150, if not 400, leaders". In what was seen as a reaction against Gupta's aggressive firm expansion, Gupta's successor Ian Davis was elected by "emphasizing the need for a return to the McKinsey heritage".

After completing three full terms (the maximum allowed, by a rule he had himself initiated) and nearly a decade as head of the firm, Gupta became senior partner again in 2003 and senior partner emeritus in 2007. According to close friends when he stepped down as McKinsey management director, Gupta lost what NYU's Lechner called "the halo effect" including the tremendous status afforded by his previous role. Gupta reportedly began to express a certain resentment about money, as his peers in Silicon Valley and Wall Street (including McKinsey's private equity clients) at the time "raking in staggering amounts of money while Gupta soldiered on with a mere senior partner's millions".

Gupta maintained an office, executive assistant, email and phone at McKinsey and Company after 2007, and maintained the title "senior partner emeritus" of the firm. He also continued to receive a salary from McKinsey as senior partner emeritus, totaling $6 million in 2008 and $2.5 million for each of the following three years. However, in the wake of subsequent scandals a McKinsey spokesperson was quoted as saying, "Our firm no longer has a professional relationship with Rajat Gupta." According to NDTV, "sources tell us that the firm dropped Mr Gupta from its alumni database, and called clients worldwide to say that they would have nothing to do with him going forward". The manner in which the firm severed ties with its former head attracted some controversy. After his release from prison, Gupta continued to be rebuffed by McKinsey.

=== Outside McKinsey & Company ===
In 1997 Gupta co-founded the Indian School of Business (ISB) with friend and fellow senior partner Anil Kumar. The school was ranked number 13 in the world by The Financial Times in its Global MBA Rankings 2011. Gupta and Kumar later resigned as chairman and executive board director respectively.

Before stepping down as managing director he co-founded Scandent Solutions with Ramesh Vangal and the American India Foundation with Victor Menezes and Lata Krishnan. After McKinsey Gupta co-founded and chaired the private equity firm New Silk Route, formerly named Taj Capital Partners, with Parag Saxena and Victor Menezes.

In 2005, five years after Raj Rajaratnam "gave generously to two of Gupta's favorite Indian causes", Gupta, Rajaratnam and Ravi Trehan, an investor via BroadStreet Group and another friend of Gupta, co-founded Voyager Capital, 80% owned by Rajaratnam and capitalized at $50 million.

Gupta has served on several corporate boards as a director during his career. He became a member of the board of Procter & Gamble in 2007, and held that post until March 2011. He was also a member of the board of investment bank Goldman Sachs from 2006 until the expiration of his term in 2010. Gupta was also the non-executive chairman of Genpact from 2007 until March 2011. He also served on the board of AMR, the parent company of American Airlines, from 2008 until 2011, and on the board of Harman International from 2009 to 2011. Gupta has also served on the board of Russian bank Sberbank, and as a managing advisor to Symphony Technology Group.

Gupta has also served as a director of various financial groups. In addition to his work at Goldman Sachs, Gupta served as an advisory partner with Fjord Capital Partners and as chairman of the advisory board for Clutch Group. Gupta was also a member of the advisory board for OmniCapital Group.

== Philanthropy ==
Gupta's philanthropic, charitable, and volunteer efforts mainly focus on the areas of education, global health, and global business.

In the past, Gupta has been involved with a number of universities and other educational institutions, volunteering and serving as chairman and member of several boards and councils. As of 2011, he has either resigned or taken leaves of absence from the boards on which he served as director or chairman.

In June 1995, Gupta was elected to the University of Chicago's board of trustees. He also served as a member of the Yale President's Council.

Gupta co-founded the Indian Institute of Technology Alumni Association. He was chairman and served on the advisory board.

With Anil Kumar, Gupta co-founded the Indian School of Business, and was chairman of the governing and executive boards.

Gupta served as chairman of the board of associates of the Harvard Business School, and was a member of the board of governors for the Lauder Institute of Management & International Studies at The Wharton School, University of Pennsylvania. Additionally he served on the Dean's advisory council at the MIT Sloan School of Management and on the advisory board of Northwestern University's Kellogg School of Management.

Gupta was a member of the Dean's advisory board of Tsinghua University School of Economics and Management, and was on the board of Skolkovo. Gupta was on the boards of Millennium Promise and the Pratham India Education Initiative.

In 2009, he was elected as a Member of the American Academy of Arts and Sciences. In 2011, he became a founding member of the Young India Fellowship. He is the former Co-Chairman of the United Nations Association of America.

Gupta's activities in global health include serving as a founding board member and then chairman for The Global Fund to Fight AIDS, Tuberculosis and Malaria. He served from April 2007 to March 2011. He was the co-founder and founding chairman of the Public Health Foundation of India. He was on the board of the Emergency Management and Research Institute, Health Management Research Institute, International Partnership for Microbicides, Board for the Global Health Council, the Global Health Council and the Harvard School of Public Health, and the Weill Cornell Medical College. He was chairman of the advisory board and the India AIDS initiative of The Gates Foundation and its Global Health Initiative until 2011. He is a former member of the United Nations Commission on the Private Sector and Development. In March 2006, he was named the founding chairman for the Public Health Foundation of India (PHFI). He remained in that position until resigning in March 2011.

In addition, he was the co-founder and co-chairman of the American India Foundation (AIF), the largest diaspora philanthropy organization focused on India and based out of the US. He began the organization in response to an earthquake that struck India in 2001, with its initial goal to help victims. From 2006 to 2011, he served as a trustee for the Rockefeller Foundation.

Throughout his career, Gupta has been a part of various global business initiatives. He was previously the chairman of the International Chamber of Commerce, and was appointed as special assistant to the Secretary General for Management Reform for UN Secretary General Kofi Annan in 2005. From 2008 to 2010, Gupta was a member of the foundation board for the World Economic Forum. Gupta was chairman of the U.S.-India Business Council from 2002 to 2005. He served on Indian Prime Minister Manmohan Singh's global advisory council from its inception until early 2012.

== Insider trading conviction and prison service ==
On March 1, 2009, the SEC filed an administrative civil complaint against Gupta for insider trading with billionaire and Galleon Group hedge fund founder Rajaratnam. Coverage of the event noted that Anil Kumar – who, like Gupta, had graduated from IIT, was a highly regarded senior partner at McKinsey, and had also co-founded the Indian School of Business – had already pleaded guilty to charges in the same case. Gupta, Kumar, and Rajaratnam were all close friends and business partners. Gupta countersued and both sides eventually dropped charges.

On October 26, 2010 the United States Attorney's Office filed criminal charges against Gupta. He was arrested in New York City by the FBI and pleaded not guilty. He was released on $10 million bail on the same day. Gupta's lawyer wrote, "Any allegation that Rajat Gupta engaged in any unlawful conduct is totally baseless ... He did not trade in any securities, did not tip Mr. Rajaratnam so he could trade, and did not share in any profits as part of any quid pro quo." The SEC alleged, "The tips generated 'illicit profits and loss avoidance' of more than $23 million." Manhattan U.S. Attorney Preet Bharara said, "Rajat Gupta was entrusted by some of the premier institutions of American business to sit inside their boardrooms, among their executives and directors, and receive their confidential information so that he could give advice and counsel."

Details of wiretap recordings and trading activity related to the charges were analyzed at length in the media, assessing the strengths and weaknesses of the prosecution's and defense's cases.

The case focused on the relationship between Rajaratnam, Kumar and Gupta. All were involved to varying degrees as founding partners of private-equity firms Taj Capital and New Silk Route, though Rajaratnam and Kumar left before they began operation. Gupta remained as chairman of New Silk Route, and Rajaratnam eventually invested $50 million in the fund.

Gupta's jury trial began on May 22, 2012. On June 15, 2012, Gupta was found guilty on three counts of securities fraud and one count of conspiracy. He was found not guilty on two other securities fraud charges. At the time, his lawyer told reporters, "We will be moving to set aside the verdict and will, if necessary, appeal the conviction." The maximum sentence for securities fraud is 20 years and the maximum sentence for conspiracy is five years. In arguments in mid-October, prosecutors favored prison time of up to 10 years while defense attorneys favored probation and community service. As one service option, the latter suggested Gupta "work on health care and agriculture in rural Rwanda". Prosecutors based their recommendation in part on $11.2 million profits, or losses avoided, by Rajaratnam based on the tips. The defense argued Gupta "never profited on the alleged trading" per one news account.

On October 24, 2012, Gupta was sentenced to two years in prison by Judge Jed S. Rakoff of the United States District Court in Manhattan for leaking boardroom secrets to Rajaratnam. His conviction was upheld by a Federal Appeals Court on March 25, 2014. His prison sentence began on June 17. On June 11, 2014, the US Supreme Court rejected Gupta's bail plea, a week before his prison term began.

Gupta was released from federal prison on January 5, 2016, on house arrest and required to live at his Manhattan home. He was allowed to go to an office during weekdays starting in January, according to an unnamed source. The house arrest ended in March 2016. Having once rejected the argument, in February 2016 the US Second Circuit Court of Appeals in Manhattan agreed to hear Gupta's appeal to overturn his conviction. The appeal was turned down by the Federal Court on January 7, 2019.

== After release ==
Gupta's memoir, Mind Without Fear, was published by Juggernaut Books in March 2019. In a detailed one-hour interview subsequent to publication, he described his side of the story. He said he did not speak during his trial based on the advice of his lawyers. He also said that there was "no benefit, no establishment of criminal intent. They made up a case, and they succeeded." Interviewer Madhu Trehan asked him about his former protégé Kumar testifying against him. She also asked him why his book lacked any contrition.

== Personal life ==
Rajat Gupta married Anita Mattoo, two years his junior, in 1973 after they had met at IIT Delhi. She was an electrical engineer, and according to him "a much smarter student" than himself. The couple met at college debates and plays. Mattoo came from Srinagar, Kashmir, India. They have four daughters.

Gupta's net worth in 2008 was estimated at US$84 million.

== See also ==
- SEC v. Rajaratnam, also known as U.S. v. Rajaratnam
- Chip Skowron, hedge fund portfolio manager convicted of insider trading
- Mathew Martoma, hedge fund trader and portfolio manager convicted of insider trading

Business positions
Preceded by Fred Gluck	Managing director of McKinsey & Company, Inc. 1994–2003	Succeeded by Ian Davis
