= Aneiros =

Aneiros is a surname. Notable people with the surname include:

- Antonio Martínez Aneiros (1933–2026), Spanish politician
- León Federico Aneiros (1826–1894), Argentine Catholic priest
