= Lacayo =

Lacayo is a surname, from the Spanish language it originally described a footman. Notable people with the surname include:

- Benjamín Lacayo Sacasa (1893–1959), Nicaraguan politician and President of Nicaragua
- Ernesto Lacayo (born 1989), American football player
- José Antonio Lacayo de Briones y Palacios (1679–1756), Spanish general and colonial governor
- Júnior Lacayo (born 1995), Honduran footballer
- Marianela Lacayo (born 1981), Nicaraguan model and journalist
- Rafael Lacayo (born 1998), Nicaraguan sports shooter
- Rossana Lacayo (born 1956), Nicaraguan photographer, scriptwriter, and filmmaker
