= DSQ =

DSQ may refer to:

- Disability Studies Quarterly, the magazine of the Society for Disability Studies
- Donald Sinta Quartet, a saxophone quartet at the University of Michigan
- Dallas String Quartet, an American classical crossover ensemble
- .dsq, the file extension for Corel QUERY files
- Dawsahak language (language code), a language of Mali
- DSQ Software, founded in 1992 in India
- A disqualification
