= Rossana Lacayo =

Nicaraguan photographer and filmmaker

- Born: 3 September 1956 (age 70); Managua, Nicaragua
- Education: Duke University
- Occupations: Photographer, filmmaker, producer
- Years active: Since 1982
- Website: gotafilmsnicaragua.weebly.com

Rossana Lacayo de Herguedas, known professionally as Rossana Lacayo (born 3 September 1956) is a Nicaraguan photographer, scriptwriter, and filmmaker. She is considered a pioneer of Nicaraguan cinema as stated by the Nicaraguan Cultural Institute. In 2003 she founded Gota Films, an independent film company. She is a member of ANCI (Nicaraguan Association of Cinematography, in Spanish Asociación Nicaragüense de Cine). Lacayo resides in Nicaragua with her family.

== Education and professional career ==
Rossana Lacayo was born in Managua but she studied high school and graduated from the Madeira School (1975) located in Virginia, USA. After high school she studied at Duke University, in North Carolina, USA and graduated with a degree in Economy (1979). In 2010 she graduated with a degree in Documentary Production (in Spanish, Documental de Creación) from the Universidad Autónoma del Estado de Morelos, located in Mexico. Although she studied economy she has stated that she was interested in photography since she was a preteen and she was given a camera. During her students university years she participated as photographer in her school's newspaper.

Early in the 1980s she returned to Nicaraguan and got a job as the official photographer of the newly formed Nicaraguan Ministry of Culture (in Spanish, Ministerio de Cultura de Nicaragua. In 1982 she traveled for a short period to El Salvador to cover the war as photographer and she has stated that she almost lost her life. In 1983 she was transferred to the Nicaraguan Institute of Cinematography INCINE (in Spanish, Instituto Nicaragüense de Cine) where she started working in the documentary production department and quickly became its chief.

According to the Nicaraguan film historian, Karly Gaitán Morales, it was in 1982 when Lacayo started to work as a professional filmmaker, when as part of INCINE, she met and worked with international movie directors like the Chilean Miguel Littín. She acquires extensive experience while working with filmmakers and actors from Mexico, France, and Cuba. Her first documentary as director was Estos sí pasarán (1984) a documentary that participated in the film festivals in Canada and Sweden. The film was also selected for the 58th Edition (1985) for the Academy Awards in Hollywood.

Even though Lacayo has worked most of her life as a filmmaker, she never abandoned photography, an activity that she considers her passion and that she maintained during the 1980s while working at INCINE. She shot a large number of movie stills from all the projects in which she was involved. In early 2000s Lacayo started to shoot photos of the daily lives of the people that live in La Chureca which is the dumpster in Managua and the largest of Nicaragua. In 2012 Lacayo was selected by the World Bank to participate, with four of her photos of the dumpster, in an exhibit titled El Cambio in Washington, DC. The following year she made a documentary on the same subject titled San Francisco de La Chureca (2013).

== Recognition ==
On 1 March 2008, Rossana Lacayo received Order of the Cultural Independence Rubén Darío for her work as a pioneer of the Nicaraguan cinema – an award given by the Nicaraguan government to outstanding individuals.

== Awards ==
- Press Award at the DOK Liepzig – XXXI International Festival of Documentary and Animation, Germanu (1988) for her documentary Un secreto para mí sola (1988) about the Nicaraguan poet Vidaluz Meneses.
- Third Coral Award at the X International Film Festival of Havana, Cuba (1988) for her work Vida en el amor, corto sobre Ernesto Cardenal (1988).
- Award for Art Direction at the Festival de Granada Cines del Sur, Spain (2006) for her work Brisa Nocturna (2006) – for this film she also received a Best Actress Award for the leading actress Elena de Sojo at the San Francisco Short Film Festival (2006) and Best Production Award at the Bruxelles Film Festival, Belgium (2006).
- Honor Mention Award at the VI Bienal de Artes Visuales, Managua, Nicaragua (2007) for her short film Equívoco, a film that also received the Special Mention Award at the Festival Internacional de Cine de Barcelona, Spain, Best Actress at the San Francisco Golden Gate Fiction and Documentary Festival, all awards in 2007. In 2008 the film received more awards like the Best Edition Award at the Festival du Cinéma de Paris and the Award for Art Production at the Philadelphia Documentary & Fiction Film Festival.
- Audience Award forBest Documentary for her work Pikineras at the 7th Festival de Cine Político, Social, y de Derechos Humanos (2013), Valparaíso, Chile.

== Complete filmography ==
Year	Title	Notes
1983	Alfabetización en Nicaragua	Member production team at INCINE
1984	Haciendo un Documental	Scriptwriter and director- vídeo (INCINE)
1984	Estos sí Pasarán	Scriptwriter and director – documentary (INCINE) – selected for the 58th Edition (1985) Academy Award
1985	Semblanzas de Julio Cortázar	Director – video documentary (INCINE)
1985	Hablemos a Calzón Quitado	Scriptwriter and director – documentary (INCINE-TV Canada)
1986	Madre Sana Niño Sano	Scriptwriter and director – documentary (INCINE-TV Canadá)
1986	Leche Materna	Scriptwriter and directora – documentary (INCINE-TV Canadá)
1988	Leonel Vanegas	Scriptwriter and director – documentary (INCINE-TV Canadá)
1988	Escuchemos a las Mujeres	Scriptwriter and director – documentary (INCINE)
1988	Vida en el Amor (Ernesto Cardenal)	Scriptwriter and director – documentary (INCINE)
1988	Un secreto para mí sola	Scriptwriter and director (INCINE)
1988	Leoncio Sáenz	Scriptwriter and director – documentary
1991	Ana Clara	Scriptwriter and director– short film (Castaldi)
1999	Uniendo esperanzas	Scriptwriter and director – documentary (Castaldi)
2003	Verdades Ocultas	Scriptwriter and director – documentary (Gota Films)
2004	Raúl y Emir	Scriptwriter and director – short film (Gota Films)
2006	Brisa Nocturna	Scriptwriter and director – short film (Gota Films)
2007	Equívoco	Scriptwriter and director – short film (Gota Films)
2007	YCAZA	Director – documentary (Gota Films)
2008	Daysiry	Scriptwriter and director (Gota Films)
2008	El diálogo permanente	Director – documentary (Gota Films)
2008	Festival de poesía de Granada	Director – documentary (Gota Films)
2008	Minguito el Señor de los Milagros	Scriptwriter and director – documental (Gota Films)
2009	A quién le importa	Scriptwriter and director – documentary (Gota Films)
2009	KAOS Experimental	Scriptwriter and director – video digital (Gota Films)
2009	Belén en Nicaragua	Scriptwriter and director – documentary (Gota Films)
2009	Funerales en el Porvenir	Scriptwriter and director – documentary (Gota Films)
2010	Paraíso Perdido	Scriptwriter and director – documentary (Gota Films)
2011	De macho a macho	Scriptwriter and director – documentary (Gota Films)
2011	Tepoz – Magic	Scriptwriter and director – short film (Iberdoc-México)
2011	El valor de las mujeres: la lucha por el derecho de la tierra	Scriptwriter and director – documentary (2009), new edition (2011), (Gota Films)
2012	Laberinto	Scriptwriter and director – short film (Gota Films)
2012	Pikineras	Scriptwriter and director – documentary (Gota Films)
2013	Sembrando esperanzas	Director – documentary (Gota Films)
2013	San Francisco en La Chureca	Scriptwriter and director – documentary (Gota Films)
