= Manuel Menezes =

Indian business executive (1922–1996)

- Born: 15 February 1922; Goa, Portuguese India
- Died: 15 June 1996 (aged 74)
- Education: University of Bombay (B.E)
- Occupation: Engineer
- Employer: Ministry of Railways
- Title: Chairman of Indian Railway Board
- Children: 4, including Victor and Ivan
- Relatives: Tara Anne Fonseca (daughter-in-law)

Manuel Menezes ICS (15 February 1922 – 15 June 1996) was an Indian business executive, engineer, and chairman of the Indian Railway Board. Having worked for Indian Railway Board, he eventually rose to the position of chairman, holding the rank of principal secretary in the Indian Civil Service.

== Personal life ==
Manuel Menezes was born in Goa, Portuguese India; his parents hailed from Bardes concelho. He had four children, Michael, Marisa Mascarenhas, Ivan, CEO of Diageo, and Victor Menezes, former senior vice chairman of Citigroup. He died on 15 June 1996.
