= Ivan Menezes =

British-American business executive (1959–2023)

Sir Ivan Menezes
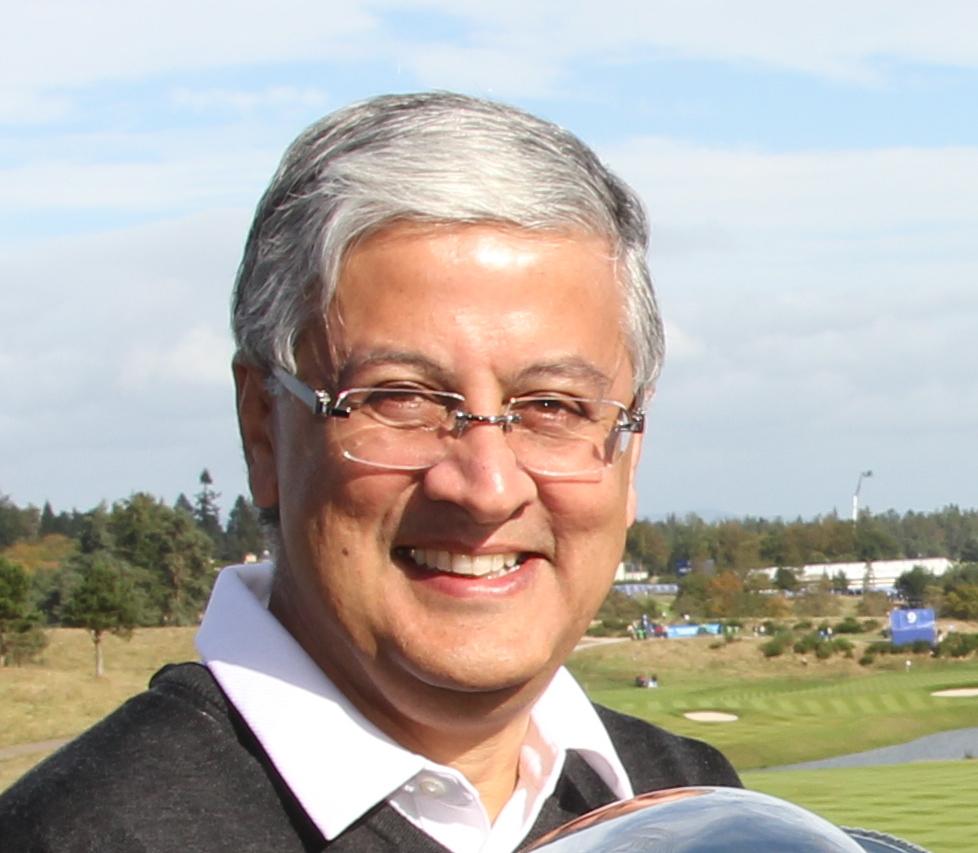
- Menezes in 2014
- Born: Ivan Manuel Menezes; 10 July 1959; Poona, Bombay State, India
- Died: 6 June 2023 (aged 63); London, England
- Education: St. Stephen's College, Delhi; IIM Ahmedabad; Kellogg School of Management
- Title: CEO of Diageo
- Term: 2013–2023
- Spouse: Shibani Menezes
- Children: 2
- Father: Manuel Menezes
- Relatives: Victor Menezes (brother); Tara Anne Fonseca (sister-in-law)

Sir Ivan Manuel Menezes (10 July 1959 – 6 June 2023) was a British-American business executive. He was the CEO of Diageo, a FTSE 100 British multinational alcoholic beverages company, from 2013 until his death in 2023, succeeding Paul S. Walsh.

== Early life ==
Ivan Manuel Menezes was born in Pune, India, on 10 July 1959, to Nina and Manuel Menezes. His mother, Nina, was a French language and music teacher, while his father, Manuel, was the chairman of the Indian Railway Board. The family was from Pomburpa village in Goa (then part of Portuguese India). His brother Victor Menezes was senior vice-chairman and CFO of Citibank.

Menezes completed his schooling from St. Mary's High School, Mt. Abu, where he graduated as a topper in the Indian school certificate examination. He went on to complete his bachelors in economics and mathematics from St. Stephen's College, Delhi, and followed it with a post-graduate degree from the Indian Institute of Management Ahmedabad. He later obtained an MBA from Northwestern University's Kellogg School of Management.

== Career ==
Menezes joined Diageo in 1997 and held various senior positions, including chief operating officer; chairman, Latin America & the Caribbean; chairman, Asia Pacific; president and CEO, Diageo North America; and chief operating officer, Diageo North America before becoming its global CEO.

Menezes joined Diageo from Guinness, when the company merged with Grand Metropolitan in 1997 to form Diageo. As the marketing head at Diageo, he is credited for developing the Keep Walking! marketing campaign for Johnnie Walker. As the CEO, he was credited for building the company to its current position owning over 200 brands in over 180 countries, including driving acquisitions of brands including Don Papa, a Philippine rum, Don Julio and Casamigos tequila brands. During his time as the CEO, the market value of the company grew from £42B to £75B. During this time, he led the company to sell most of its wines business and its low-margin mass-market beers and shift its focus toward premium brands like Guinness and spirits like Johnnie Walker.

Menezes was a non-executive director of the US-based fashion retailer Coach, Inc. and the chair of the Scotch Whisky Association.

Menezes was knighted in the 2023 New Year Honours for services to business and equality. During his tenure at Diageo, Menezes strove to diversify its leadership, making more than 40% of Diageo's senior leadership positions held by women. He held dual UK and United States citizenship. He was also an Overseas Citizen of India.

== Personal life ==
Menezes was married to Shibani Menezes, a journalist. They had met while studying at St. Stephen's College in Delhi. The couple had two children, Nikhil and Rohini. He was known to be a cricket and theatre lover.

Menezes died from complications of stomach ulcer surgery on 7 June 2023 in London, at age 63.
