= Moshe's =

Indian chain of restaurants and cafés

- Type: Private
- Industry: Restaurant
- Founded: Mumbai, Maharashtra, India (2004)
- Founder: Moshe Shek
- Headquarters: Mumbai, Maharashtra, India
- Number of locations: 13 outlets (April 2014)
- Area served: Mumbai Metropolitan Region
- Owner: Prakash Shetty (90%); Moshe Shek (10%)
- Website: Moshes.in

Moshe's is an Indian chain of restaurants and cafés specializing in Mediterranean cuisine. Indian hospitality business magazine Express Hotelier & Caterer describes the cuisine as "Mediterranean fare with a bent on Turkish, Moroccan, Israeli and Italian paired exclusively with wines". Moshe's makes its own bread and dessert items. The cafés are branded Cafe Moshé's and the restaurants are branded Moshe's.

The initial restaurants were opened and operated wholly by signature chef and founder Moshe Shek. In February 2013, Shek sold a 90% interest in the company to Prakash Shetty of Bangalore. Private equity firm New Silk Route acquired a majority stake in the company in September 2013 for an undisclosed amount.

== History ==
Moshe's was founded by Moshe Shek, an Indian Jew who was born and raised in Mumbai. Shek visited Israel in 1988 for a one-month group trip, during which he worked in a Kibbutz (a type of collective community in Israel). He later completed training courses at Sophia Polytechnic and at Richmont, Switzerland. He opened Caterbility, a catering company, in 1992, his first business venture in India. He visited Israel again in 1995. He returned to India in 1999, when he opened "Athena", a combination restaurant and lounge financed by Chateau Indage. He worked there for a year and a half. Shek claims to have "introduced the trend of having a restaurant and lounge under the same roof and a separate members' lounge".

Shek teamed up with restaurateur Farhan Azmi to open "Cafe Basilico" in 2001, where he worked for approximately a year. In 2003, Shek finally opened his own restaurant in New Delhi, called "Moshe's Oliva", without any promoter or associate. It was the first stand alone restaurant in Delhi to be named after a chef. Shek described the decision to go at it alone saying, "Having worked with promoters, I know now that henceforth I would rather not and do my own thing".

Within 6 months of opening "Moshe's Oliva" in New Delhi, two Moshe's branded outlets were opened in Mumbai. The first was opened in Cuffe Parade in 2004. It was located in a 1,600 square feet converted bungalow. The next outlet opened at Bombay Gymkhana. The chain expanded further in Mumbai by opening outlets at Crossword Bookstores at Kemps Corner, as well as restaurants in Fort and Colaba.

The company launched Moshe's Bakery Café at the Gateway of India in South Mumbai in January 2009. The café offers sandwiches, delicatessen cheese, desserts and other take away products as well as short-order meal options. The fifth Moshe's outlet opened in Palladium Mall, Lower Parel on 1 August 2011. In February 2013, Shek sold a 90% interest in the company to Prakash Shetty of Bangalore.

== Cuisine and decor ==
Moshe's cuisine mainly specializes in Mediterranean food. Moshe's also serves food from Portuguese, Greek, North African and Middle Eastern cuisines. Items available on the menu are frequently rotated.

Milk and meat are completely separated in the kitchens of Moshe's outlets, in keeping with Jewish law. However, Moshe Shek is not an observant Jew, and the food is not otherwise kosher.

Shek worked closely with architect Ajit Shilpi, who helped design Moshe's outlets. Shek describes the brand: "Moshe's is an up-market dining destination without being prissy. The tabs are reasonable and the ambience, homely. The high ceiling, dark wooden flooring, patio and garden seating give that away."

== Catering ==
Moshe's sells prepared food to Westside, a department store chain owned by the Tata Group.

== Locations ==
There are currently 13 Moshe's outlets, all located in the Mumbai Metropolitan Region.
