= Esporte Clube São Bento =

São Bento
- Full name: Esporte Clube São Bento
- Nicknames: Azulão; Bentão
- Founded: 14 September 1913; 112 years ago
- Ground: Estádio Walter Ribeiro
- Capacity: 12,525
- President: Almir Laurindo
- Head coach: Paulo Roberto Santos
- League: Campeonato Paulista Série A2
- 2025: Paulista, 14th of 16
- Website: ecsaobento.com.br
Home colors	Away colors

Esporte Clube São Bento, commonly referred to as São Bento, is a Brazilian professional association football club based in Sorocaba, São Paulo. They currently compete in the Campeonato Paulista Série A2, the second tier of the São Paulo state football league.

== History ==
On 14 September 1913, shortly after a yellow fever epidemic in Sorocaba, the club was founded as Sorocaba Athletic Club by Ferreira e Cia. horse tack factory employees. On 14 October 1914, the club was renamed to Esporte Clube São Bento. The club 's new name honors Saint Benedict, because São Bento's first games were played at the city's Saint Benedict's monastery.

In 1953, São Bento professionalized its football section. On 10 June 1953, the club played its first professional match (Campeonato Paulista Second Level), against Ferroviária of Botucatu. São Bento won 4-2.

In 1962, the club won its first title, the Campeonato Paulista Second Level, beating América (SP) in the final.

In 1979, São Bento competed in the Campeonato Brasileiro Série A. The club was eliminated in the third stage, finishing in the 15th place.

In 2001, the club won its second title, the Campeonato Paulista Third Level, finishing four points ahead of Atlético Sorocaba. In 2002, São Bento won its third title, the Copa FPF, beating Jaboticabal in the final.

São Bento reached the Semifinals in the 2016 Campeonato Brasileiro Série D, but it was eliminated by CSA, in the first leg CSA won 2-0 and in the second leg São Bento beat its opponent 1-0.

== Current squad ==
As of 4 April 2022

Note: Flags indicate national team as defined under FIFA eligibility rules; some limited exceptions apply. Players may hold more than one non-FIFA nationality.

No.	Pos.	Nation	Player
—	GK	BRA	Wellison
—	GK	BRA	William
—	GK	BRA	Zé Carlos
—	DF	BRA	Diego Sacoman
—	DF	BRA	Dogão
—	DF	BRA	Douglas Mendes
—	DF	BRA	Fellipe
—	DF	BRA	Victor Pereira
—	DF	BRA	Dênis Neves
—	DF	BRA	Éder Sciola
—	DF	BRA	Eliandro
—	DF	BRA	Foguinho
—	DF	BRA	Ruan
—	MF	BRA	Bruno Formigoni
—	MF	BRA	Lucas Lima

No.	Pos.	Nation	Player
—	MF	BRA	Victor Bolt
—	MF	BRA	Anderson Kunzel
—	MF	BRA	Diogo Oliveira
—	MF	BRA	Everton Dias
—	MF	BRA	Gian
—	MF	BRA	Kayan
—	MF	BRA	Nenê Bonilha
—	MF	BRA	Serginho
—	FW	BRA	Bruninho
—	FW	BRA	Cristiano
—	FW	BRA	Fabinho
—	FW	BRA	Francis
—	FW	BRA	Marcos Nunes
—	FW	BRA	Wilson Júnior
—	MF	BRA	Carlos Jatobá

== Honours ==
=== Official tournaments ===
State
Competitions	Titles	Seasons
Copa Paulista	2	1985, 2002
Campeonato Paulista Série A2	1	1962
Campeonato Paulista Série A3	2	2001, 2013

=== Others tournaments ===
==== State ====
- Torneio João Mendonça Falcão (1): 1966

==== City ====
- Campeonato Amador de Sorocaba (7): 1921, 1922, 1944, 1955, 1959, 1962, 1963
- Torneio Início (1): 1949

=== Runners-up ===
- Campeonato Paulista Série A2 (4): 1944, 1957, 2020, 2022
- Campeonato Paulista Série A3 (1): 1967

== Stadium ==
São Bento's home stadium is Estádio Municipal Walter Ribeiro, inaugurated in 1978, with a maximum capacity of 12,525 people.

Another stadium, named Estádio Humberto Reale is owned by the club, and has a maximum capacity of 20,000 people.

The club also trains at a training ground named Centro de Treinamento Humberto Reale.

== Club colours ==
São Bento's colours are blue and white. The club's home kit is composed of a blue shirt, white short and blue socks.

== Mascot ==
The club's mascot is a blue bird named Azulão wearing São Bento's home kit and carrying a bludgeon.

== Nickname ==
The club is nicknamed Azulão, meaning Big Blue, and Bentão, meaning Big Bento or Big Benedict.

== Ultra groups ==
- Torcida Uniformizada Falcão Azul
- Torcida Uniformizada Sangue Azul
- Torcida Uniformizada Tira Prosa
