= American India Foundation =

American non-profit organization

- Founded: 2001
- Founder: President Bill Clinton, Lata Krishnan, Rajat Gupta, Victor Menezes
- Type: Charitable trust
- Purpose: Education, Livelihood, Public Health
- Headquarters: New York
- Region served: India and United States
- Key people: Lata Krishnan (Co-Chair); Harit Talwar (Co-Chair); Nishant Pandey (CEO); Mathew Joseph (India Country Director)
- Website: AIF.org

The American India Foundation (AIF, founded 2001) is a nonprofit American organization working in India. It is one of the largest secular, non-partisan American organizations supporting development work in India.

It also runs the ServiceCorps Fellowship, renamed the William J. Clinton Fellowship for Service to India on May 11, 2009, which sends skilled young Americans in an immersive volunteer service program training and placing young professionals to support development organizations across India for 10 months.

== History ==
It was founded in 2001 at the initiative of US President Bill Clinton following a suggestion from Indian Prime Minister Atal Bihari Vajpayee by a group of Indian-Americans responding to the Gujarat earthquake.

It has offices in New York City and California, twelve chapters across the U.S., and India operations headquartered in New Delhi.

== AIF's Emergency Response ==
In cases of major national disasters in India, AIF has been involved in relief and rehabilitation efforts. It has undertaken several campaigns for relief and rehabilitation:

1. In 2001, after the Gujarat earthquake
2. In 2004, after the tsunami
3. In 2005, after the Kashmir earthquake
4. In 2019, after the Pulwama attack
5. In 2020, during the COVID-19 pandemic

AIF takes a multi-phased approach to disaster relief: relief, reconstruction and rehabilitation. AIF's focus is the long-term rehabilitation of communities, and it dedicates most of its resources to this phase. In Gujarat and Tamil Nadu, AIF funded organizations in affected communities for up to three years following the earthquake so that NGO partners could identify long-term solutions to improve the lives of people affected by disaster.
