= CodeDay =

US non-profit organization

- Formation: 2009
- Type: 501(c)(3) non-profit
- Registration no.: 26-4742589
- Purpose: STEM Education
- Headquarters: Seattle, Washington
- Location: US
- Region served: US
- Official language: English, Spanish
- Origin: Sammamish, Washington
- CEO: Tyler Menezes
- Founder: Edward Jiang
- Board of Directors: Charlie Kindel, Tyler Menezes, Fisher Adelakin, Anthony Toreson, Adele Miller, TJ Horner
- Budget: $300,000
- Staff: 17
- Volunteers: 82
- Website: CodeDay website
- Formerly called: StudentRND, SRND

CodeDay (formerly StudentRND or SRND) is a non-profit organization created to promote STEM education for high school and college students.

The organization is headquartered in Seattle, Washington and runs several programs for 55,000 students in 50 cities around the world focusing on "providing welcoming and diverse opportunities for under-served students to explore a future in tech and beyond."

== History ==
CodeDay was founded in 2009 by Edward Jiang as "Student Research and Development" (which is still the organization's legal name), and was initially a makerspace for students and high school accelerator, helping to start several successful companies. The early days of the organization were profiled in the book, Be a Changemaker: How to Start Something That Matters.

The original mission of CodeDay was to "create the next generation of technologists" through makerspaces, however CodeDay closed its makerspace in 2013, citing lack of attendance and high costs, and began focusing entirely on CodeDay.

Around the same time, CodeDay adopted a mission of increasing interest in Computer Science, as well as focusing on attracting diverse students. Despite this focus on diversity, it does not promote to any single demographic, reporting a combined diversity of 68% women, low-income, African American, and Latino students (compared to the industry norm of 14%).

As of 2020, 36,594 students without experience had taken part in CodeDay's programs, and 25,681 continued to code.

== CodeDay (event) ==
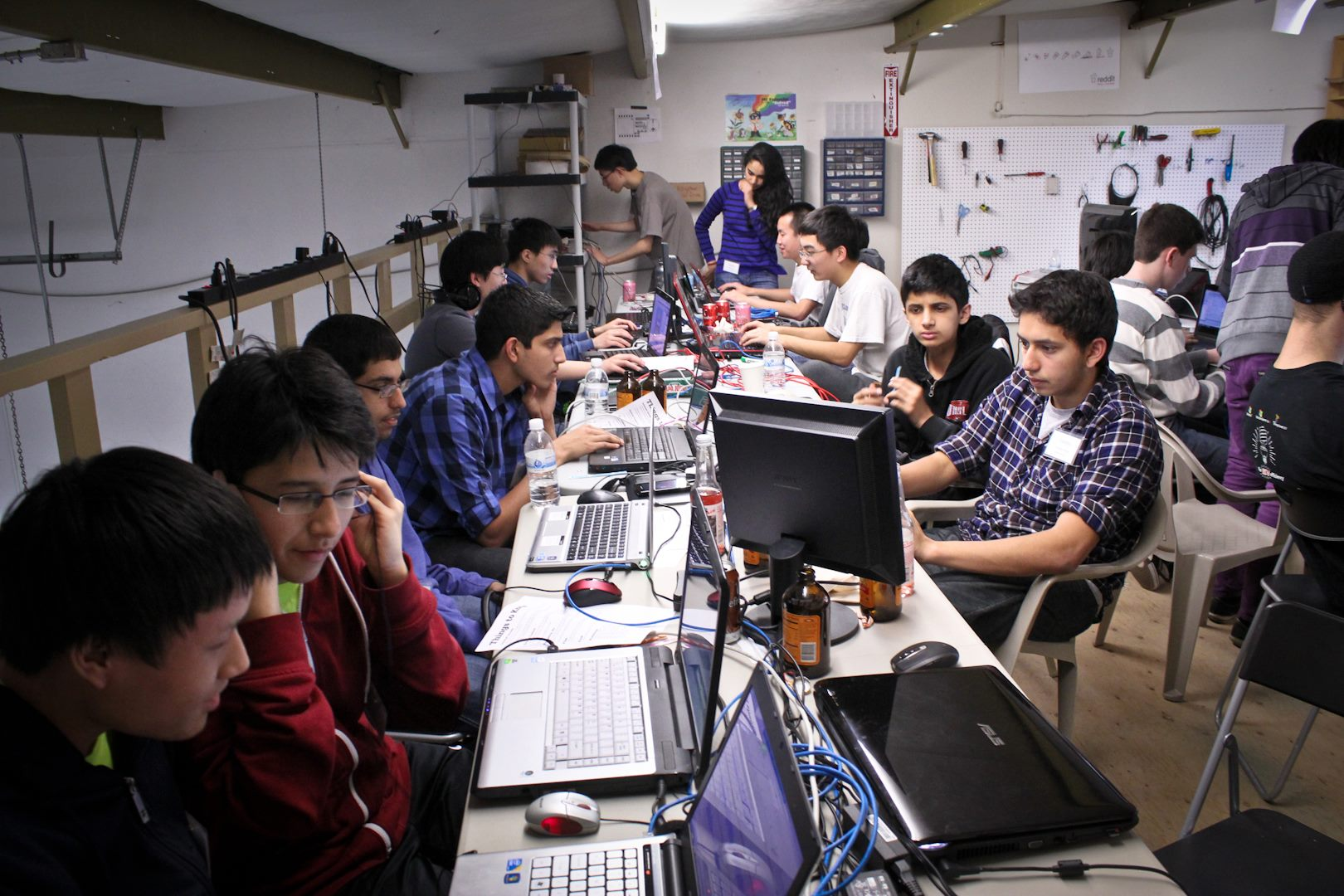
CodeDay February 2012

CodeDay started its core event program in 2012, a series of 24-hour programming competitions run across the US every few months, usually on long weekends.

CodeDay is currently hosted in 48 cities, focusing on regions without robust tech sectors. All cities run CodeDays simultaneously, and are hosted at local tech companies or co-working spaces, and funded by local donations, sponsorships, and a $10 entrance fee, which some consider controversial.

Events are 24-hours-long with pitches at the beginning and presentations at the end. Many students do not sleep and program for the entire event. During the events, there are workshops on various subjects, as well as a CTF called CodeCup. Many students who attend CodeDay have little or no experience before attending. The goal of CodeDay is to get these students to continue to pursue Computer Science after they leave.

In response to COVID-19, CodeDay began hosting online CodeDay events in April 2020, called Virtual CodeDay. CodeDay started hosting its in-person events again in November 2021, but continued to host Virtual CodeDay.

In early 2022, CodeDay expanded into Asia with the introduction of events in Singapore and Mumbai.

In 2023, CodeDay hosted its event on Lucknow, Amritsar and will host events on Kolkata, Durg, Bangalore and many other cities.

CodeDay Locations
Location	Active
Atlanta	Yes
Baltimore	Yes
DC	Yes
Phoenix	Yes
Pittsburgh	Yes
San Francisco	Yes
New York
Singapore
Mumbai	No (Impacted by COVID)
Georgia	No (Impacted by COVID)
El Paso	No (Impacted by COVID)
Erie	No (Impacted by COVID)
Birmingham	No (Impacted by COVID)
New Hampshire	No (Impacted by COVID)
Virginia	No (Impacted by COVID)
Minneapolis-St. Paul	No (Impacted by COVID)
Baltimore	No (Impacted by COVID)
Valdez	No (Impacted by COVID)
Anchorage	No (Impacted by COVID)
Boston	No (Impacted by COVID)
New Jersey	No (Impacted by COVID)
Philadelphia	No (Impacted by COVID)
Boca Raton	No (Impacted by COVID)
Orlando	No (Impacted by COVID)
Columbia	No (Impacted by COVID)
Toronto	No (Impacted by COVID)
Detroit	No (Impacted by COVID)
Dayton	No (Impacted by COVID)
Nashville	No (Impacted by COVID)
Wisconsin	No (Impacted by COVID)
Chicago	No (Impacted by COVID)
Bloomington-Normal	No (Impacted by COVID)
St. Louis	No (Impacted by COVID)
Iowa	No (Impacted by COVID)
Omaha	No (Impacted by COVID)
Kansas City	No (Impacted by COVID)
Houston	No (Impacted by COVID)
Austin	No (Impacted by COVID)
Dallas	No (Impacted by COVID)
Colorado	No (Impacted by COVID)
Yuma	No (Impacted by COVID)
Tucson	No (Impacted by COVID)
Flagstaff	No (Impacted by COVID)
Salt Lake City	No (Impacted by COVID)
Las Vegas	No (Impacted by COVID)
Sacramento	No (Impacted by COVID)
San Diego	No (Impacted by COVID)
Los Angeles	No (Impacted by COVID)
Corvallis	No (Impacted by COVID)
Portland	No (Impacted by COVID)
Seattle	No (Impacted by COVID)
Vancouver	No (Impacted by COVID)

== CodeDay Labs ==
In 2013 CodeDay launched a summer program called StudentRND Labs which taught students skills of entrepreneurship. In 2017 the organization relaunched the Labs program as an entirely online program with focused on technology education and providing an experience similar to an internship, working on open-source software.

The program runs from June through August and pairs college students up with full-time programmers from the technology industry to contribute to open source software. Though the program claims to try to replicate a traditional technology internship, some differences include that only 20 hours per week is required to participate, students are not hired by a particular company, and most students are not paid. There is also a "beginner track" which pairs high school students up with college interns.

== Other programs ==
CodeDay also runs several other programs:

- a computer science fair with workshops and demonstrations called CS Fairs
- cybersecurity and data science challenges for schools
- an online community for students
