= New Silk Route =

Private equity firm

New Silk Route partners
- Company type: Private
- Industry: Private equity
- Predecessor: Taj Capital
- Founded: 2006
- Founder: Rajat Gupta; Parag Saxena; Victor Menezes
- Headquarters: New York, United States; Mumbai, India; Bengaluru, India; Dubai, United Arab Emirates
- Key people: Parag Saxena (CEO); Victor Menezes
- Products: Private equity, growth capital
- AUM: $1.4 billion
- Website: nsrpartners.com

New Silk Route Partners LLC (NSR) is an Indian private equity firm that invests in private companies in India, Asia, and the Middle East.

== History ==
In early 2006, Parag Saxena, Rajat Gupta, and Raj Rajaratnam joined Mark Schwartz, the former chairman of Goldman Sachs Asia, to start a blended hedge fund and private equity company called Taj Capital Partners Asia Fund. By December 2006, plans had changed; the hedge fund was dropped and the firm was renamed New Silk Route, focused on investing in South Asian companies. By mid 2010 the fund owned stakes in more than 10 Indian companies.

Kumar, Rajaratnam, and Schwartz resigned as founding partners before the firm began operation.

The firm enjoyed close relationships with both Goldman Sachs and the Galleon Group: "A month before joining Goldman’s board, Rajat Gupta began marketing a $2 billion hybrid private-equity and hedge fund vehicle called Taj Capital Partners with one of Goldman’s biggest hedge fund clients, Raj Rajaratnam." According to Fortune, "New Silk Route's original fundraising was for $2 billion (under the name Taj Capital) -- and [...] the first $600 million or so went into Galleon hedge funds."

== Management ==
- Parag Saxena, CEO and founding general partner
- Sanjeev Chachondia, operating partner
- Anand Dorairaj, partner
- Jacob Kurian, partner
- Jens Yahya Zimmerman, partner
- Vivek Sett, partner

== Advisory board ==
The fund formed a strategic advisory board in January 2012 comprising:

- Dr. Herbert Henzler, former Senior Partner and Chairman of Europe at McKinsey & Company
- Nina Shapiro, VP Finance at International Finance Corporation
- Supratim Bose, President of Asia-Pacific at Boston Scientific and former Partner at New Silk Route

== Investments ==
In 2007, it invested in Reliance Telecom Infrastructure and Ascend Telecom. In 2008, it invested in Augere, Beaconhouse School System, Destimoney, and Orissa Television Communications. In 2010 NSR invested in Café Coffee Day, Nectar Lifesciences, and Amonix.

In 2013 it invested in Moshes Fine Foods. It had large stakes in 9X Media and Ascend Telecom Infrastructure as of 2016. Its other investments at the time included VRL Logistics, Rolex Rings, KS Oils, Varsity Education Management and Vasudev Adiga’s Fast Food.
