= Parag Saxena =

- Born: April 27, 1955 (age 71); Pune, Bombay State, India
- Education: IIT Bombay (BTech); University of Pennsylvania (MBA)
- Occupation: Venture capitalist

Parag Saxena (Hindi: पराग सक्सेना; born April 27, 1955) is an Indian-American investment manager who is the co-founder and general partner of Vedanta Capital. He had previously founded Invesco Private Capital, a subsidiary of Invesco. He also co-founded and is CEO of New Silk Route, an Asia-focused venture capital firm.

== Early life and education ==
Saxena earned a B.Tech from the Indian Institute of Technology, an M.S. in Chemical Engineering from the West Virginia College of Graduate Studies and an M.B.A. from the Wharton School of the University of Pennsylvania.

== Career ==
Saxena started his career at Becton Dickinson as a product manager in 1978. He joined Citicorp Investment Management in 1983; the company became Chancellor Capital Management in 1988. Invesco acquired the company in 1998, and Saxena became the managing partner and founder of Invesco Private Capital, a subsidiary of Invesco. Over the course of four years, he was on Forbes Midas List.

He spent 23 years at Invesco Private Capital. He stepped down as managing partner of Invesco Private Capital in April 2006, with the New York Times noting many investors had been leaving the company, and quoting him as noting that conflict among management and lawsuits against Invesco had made it increasingly hard to raise funds.

In May 2006, Saxena launched the New York-based diversified venture capital firm Vedanta, along with former Invesco executives Alessandro Piol and Howard Goldstein. In 2007, a $275-million collateralized fund obligation (CFO), originally founded in 2004, was acquired from Invesco by Vedanta, making Vedanta a spin-out of Invesco.

In 2006, he co-founded New Silk Route, an Asia-focused venture capital firm, with Rajat Gupta and Raj Rajaratnam, as well as Mark Schwartz, a Goldman Sachs veteran who left New Silk Route in 2008. Saxena is CEO of the company. The fund closed to investors in late 2008. Gupta filed a lawsuit against Saxena in 2013, alleging Saxena in 2012 started limiting his access to New Silk Route after Gupta had been sentenced in 2012 for securities fraud; the lawsuit was dismissed by a judge in 2013 for being irrelevant.

== Personal life ==
Saxena is married to Usha Saxena, and they have several children together. In 2022 the couple gave $10 million to Brown University to expand the study of South Asia, and the university renamed its Center for Contemporary South Asia to the Saxena Center for Contemporary South Asia.
