= Icarius De Menezes =

Brazilian fashion designer

- Born: April 20, 1975; Curitiba, Brazil
- Occupations: Creative director, fashion designer
- Known for: ICARIUS label, Diesel Black Gold, Lancetti revival

Icarius De Menezes (born 20 April 1975, Curitiba, Brazil) is a Brazilian creative director. He lives and works in Milan.

== Development ==
As a student, Icarius caught the attention of the Brazilian press with the presentation of his conceptual and polemical collections, with subjects such as cancer and plastic surgery. His works also included reflections on the social and political decadence so rife in Brazil at the time giving his collections a broader, more sophisticated, and cleaner allure. During this time he also worked as a collaborator for Vogue Brazil and Casa Vogue. Following his graduation from the Santa Marcelina Fine Arts School in the late 1990s, he launched his prêt-à-porter label ICARIUS. During this same period, he also worked as head designer for Ellus, the foremost denim label, and thus had the opportunity to develop his versatility as both labels had a strong impact.

At the age of 24, Icarius presented his prêt-à-porter collections at Carrousel du Louvre in Paris from 2000 to 2002. The collections were characterized by his artist's obsession with the human body in all its forms, mixed with experimental prints and a delicate style of minimal and new age. The Icarius label enjoyed worldwide success and praise from the international press and buyers, and was immediately snapped up by such stores as Barneys, Neiman Marcus, Maria Luisa, Joseph, Selfridges, Joyce and Daslu.

Icarius took part in Enka Mania, a project to promote new designers, sponsored by Vogue Italia. It was on this occasion that Franca Sozzani, the prestigious head of the jury, gave him the task of renewing Lancetti, the historic Italian maison, with the responsibility of restoring it to a respectable position in Italian fashion. As creative director, he successfully relaunched Lancetti, giving it a fresh, clean and sophisticated line, and once again igniting the attention of buyers and the press, and broadening its client list with boutiques such as Antonia and Saks Dubai.

Icarius was given the role of creative director for all Diesel lines: denim, female and male collections, accessories, underwear and beachwear. He was also made brand creator, style coordinator and head designer for "Diesel Black Gold" in New York's official calendar, giving him the opportunity to compare aligned strategies for different markets.

After his large contributions, Icarius decided to retire for a period to concentrate on a new project which consisted of a mix of all his experiences and future visions. He created an online platform which gives minds a possibility to express themselves by interpreting the DNA of ICARIUS; it is a search for male beauty and perfection connecting fashion, science, art and technology.
