= Igor Caetano =

Brazilian footballer (born 1995)

Personal information
- Full name: Igor Caetano Menezes Trindade
- Date of birth: 5 July 1995 (age 31)
- Place of birth: Brazil
- Height: 1.78 m (5 ft 10 in)
- Position: Midfielder

Senior career*
Years	Team	Apps	(Gls)
2012–2013	Santa Cruz	4	(0)
2014	União de Leiria	0	(0)
2014–2015	Torreense	18	(0)
2015–2016	Coruchense	28	(6)
2016–2018	Mirandela	27	(1)
2018	Cesarense	2	(0)
2018–2019	União Sport Club	15	(2)
2020	Brasil de Farroupilha	2	(0)
- * Club domestic league appearances and goals as of 17:58, 14 October 2020 (UTC)

Igor Caetano Menezes Trindade, known as Igor Caetano (born 5 July 1995) is a Brazilian football player.

== Club career ==
He made his professional debut in the Campeonato Gaúcho for Santa Cruz on 24 March 2012 in a game against Canoas.
