= William Menezes =

Brazilian footballer

Personal information
- Full name: William Amorim Martins de Menezes
- Date of birth: 5 April 1989 (age 37)
- Place of birth: Campanha, Brazil
- Height: 1.93 m (6 ft 4 in)
- Position: Goalkeeper

Team information
- Current team: Aparecidense

Youth career
- 2000–2008: Cruzeiro

Senior career*
Years	Team	Apps	(Gls)
2008	Cruzeiro	0	(0)
2008	→ Itaúna (loan)	0	(0)
2008–2009	Juventude	0	(0)
2009–2011	Santo André	0	(0)
2009	→ São Bernardo (loan)	0	(0)
2011–2012	Boa Esporte	0	(0)
2012	Noroeste	0	(0)
2013	Taubaté	19	(0)
2014–2017	Coritiba	6	(0)
2016	→ Maringá (loan)	3	(0)
2018	Oeste	15	(0)
2019	Anapolina	7	(0)
2019	Boavista	0	(0)
2020	Taubaté	16	(0)
2020–2021	Ituano	0	(0)
2021–2022	São Bento	5	(0)
2023	Taubaté	14	(0)
2023–	Aparecidense	0	(0)
- * Club domestic league appearances and goals as of 24 August 2023

William Amorim Martins de Menezes (born 5 April 1989), known as William Menezes, is a Brazilian footballer who plays as a goalkeeper for Boavista.
