= La Chureca =

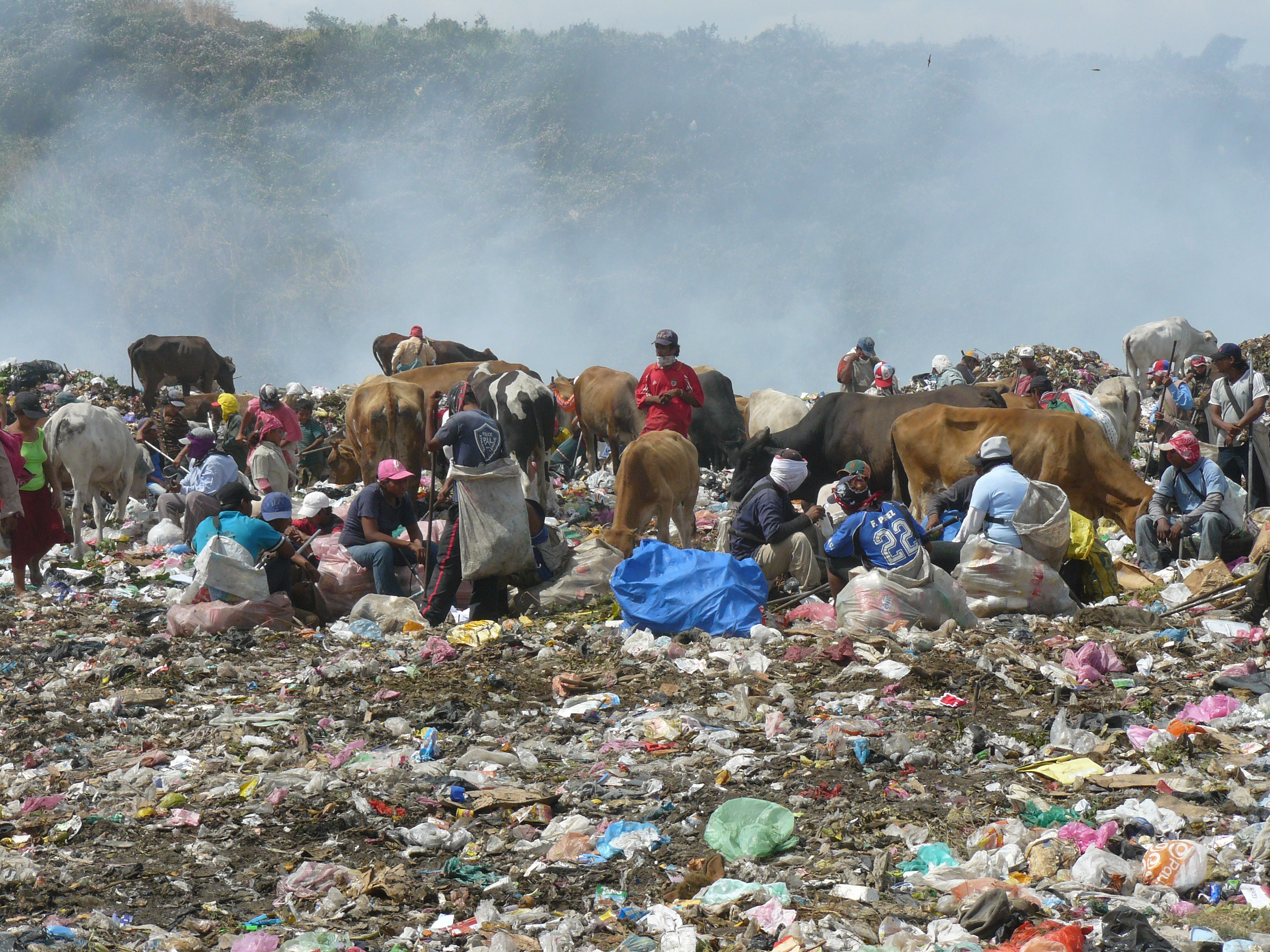
"Churequeros" working in La Chureca

La Chureca (Spanish slang word for city dump) was the municipal domestic and industrial waste-disposal site in Managua, Nicaragua. It was the largest open-air landfill in Central America, covering 7 km^{2} in the north-western corner of Managua. It is located on the south shore of Lake Managua, and it is near Acahualinca, home to the famous ancient footprints of Acahualinca. Out of the approximately 1,000 persons who reside at the dump, 50% are children under age 18. These children and families work at La Chureca sorting through the waste. Approximately 400 to 440 families live in La Chureca.

== History ==
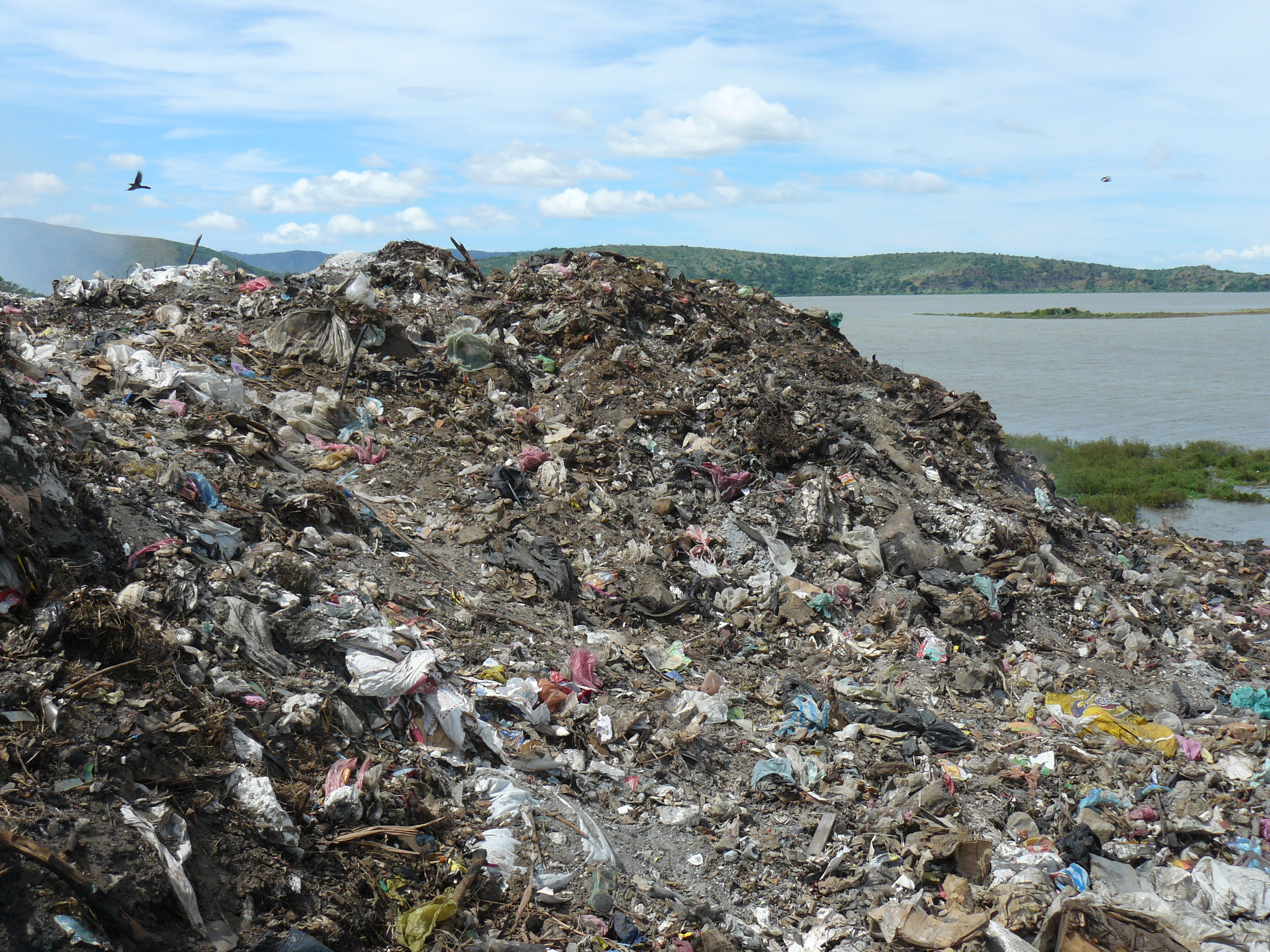
Mountain of trash next to Lake Managua

It is difficult to say when La Chureca was created as there is no exact date recorded. Most remember it growing significantly after a devastating earthquake hit Managua on December 23, 1972 (Bergin, 2008). According to Science News (1972), the Managuan earthquake devastated approximately 70% of the city, left thousands dead and many others injured. In addition, tens of thousands were left unemployed and this led to a large a rise in extreme poverty. The combination of unemployment and extreme poverty led many families to scavenge for metals and building materials left in the rubble of the earthquake (Bergin, 2008). The majority of these materials ended up in La Chureca, prompting its rapid growth (ibid). In order to feed themselves, people from all over Managua who had no other alternatives went to La Chureca in the morning and worked long days, looking for salvageable materials for their own use or to sell (ibid). Though some people returned home after their long days at work, other who were left homeless after the earthquake constructed their houses out of the rubble itself and stayed in La Chureca. La Chureca has continuously grown since the 1970s.

== Characteristics ==
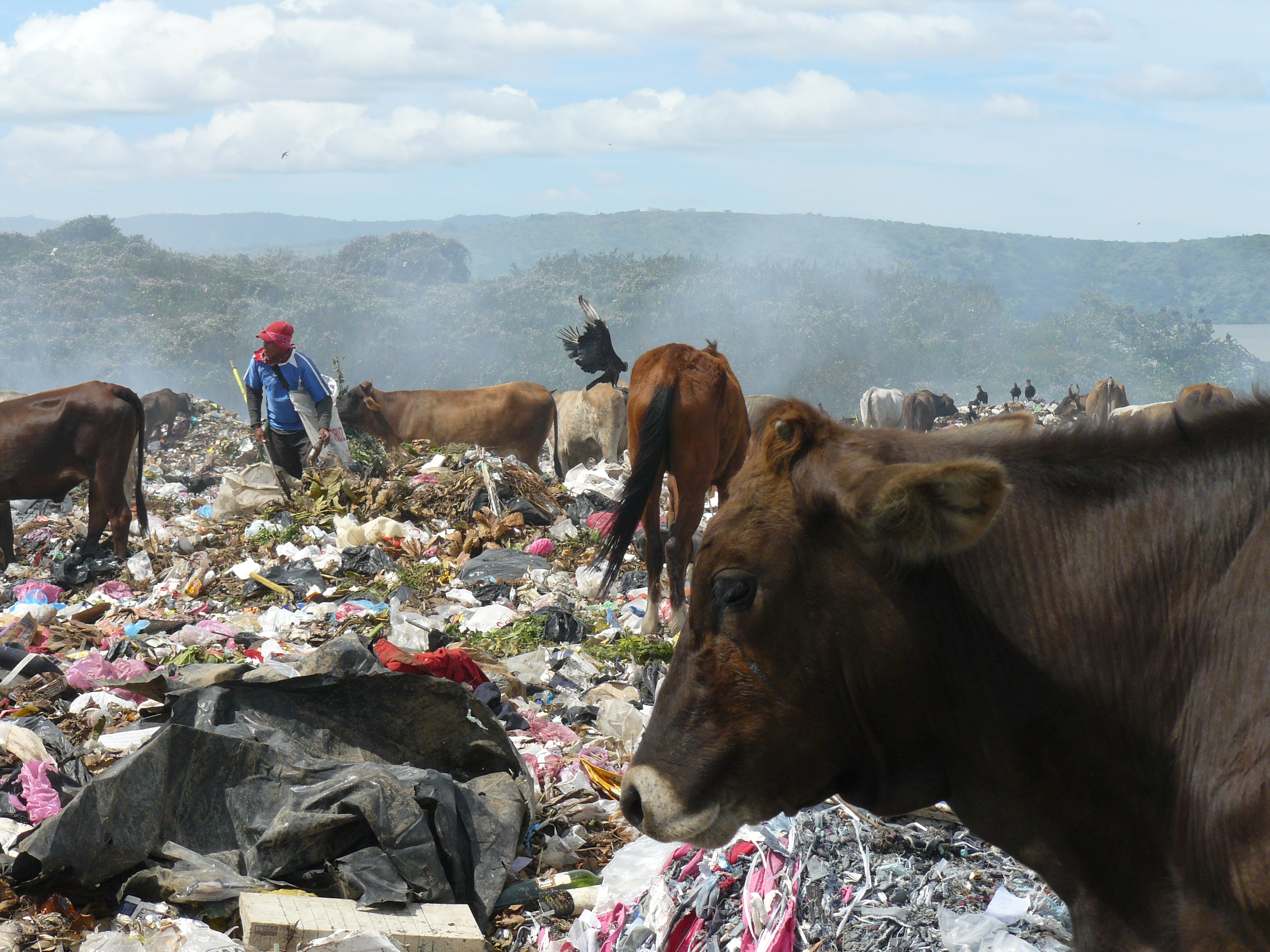
Coexistence of wildlife and humans at the La Chureca landfill

La Chureca is a slang term for the city trash dump in Managua, Nicaragua, referring to a community of people who live and work there, "sifting" or "filtering" through the garbage daily. La Chureca is the municipal domestic and industrial waste disposal site in Managua, the capital of Nicaragua. Managua, which is in the south western part of Nicaragua, is situated at the shore of Lake Managua. Lake Managua is the second largest lake in Nicaragua and is used as the recipient of domestic and industrial wastewater from the city. La Chureca is located on the south shore of Lake Managua and covers an area of 7 km^{2}. It is beside the museum that contains the famous 6,000-year-old Acahualinca footprints, the oldest remaining human and animal footprints on the American continent. La Chureca is the largest open air dumpster in Central America. It is surrounded by high brick walls, covering 42 hectares of Managua. Grisby Vergara describes this area as a war zone and an “enormous breeding ground for flies, microbes, rotting food, burnt trash, hundreds of plastic bags..”. Thick smoke covers the area, as a result of the fires that are set by the Mayor and municipal government office to keep the garbage from piling up and retrieve iron and other materials. In addition, there is constant stench in the air of shoe glue, lead, and excrement.

Managua's population has considerably expanded since 1995. Consequently, garbage production has also increased. Managua produces over 1,200 tons of garbage daily. There are big trucks full of garbage that arrive in La Chureca every day at all hours of the day. There are approximately 3000 individuals who make their living working in La Chureca. Of these, approximately 115–180 families live within La Chureca. The individuals who work and live in La Chureca are named ‘churequeros’ and they are some of the poorest people of the country. Of these, more than 50% are children under the age of 18. Children are most often involved in more than one activity, most frequently: handling glass, metals, and plastics. Working in La Chureca is considered one of the worst forms of child labour in Nicaragua. Some of the most common activities of La Chureca workers of all ages include: recollection, classification, selling, storing, and cleaning of recyclable waste. Over the years, ‘churequeros’ have figured out ways of organizing the trash and making small profits off salvageable and recyclable materials. These individuals swarm all around La Chureca with makeshift spears which are used to pick through the garbage which is then sorted and sold to suppliers of recyclable materials. Workers in La Chureca are self-employed individuals and, or families who collect salvageable items such as plastic, aluminum cans, and scrap metals such as copper and iron. These workers are highly organized labour chains. That is, if one person collects glass, the other will clean it, another will crush and recycle it and another will sell it to a collector who will then sell it to different companies. It is clear that the existing piles of garbage would be much larger if it were not for the individuals that work there. La Chureca produces approximately US$20 million a year in marketable garbage and Churequeros earn between US$1.50 and US$2 a day. Materials are often sold by the pound. For example, eleven pounds of aluminum equates to roughly twelve córdoba profits (US$0.63) for garbage sorters.

Living and working in La Chureca brings health hazards to churequeros. Often, families need to scavenge food from the waste as they lack the means necessary to purchase food. The food that is scavenged is mostly from restaurants dumping meat, dairy products, vegetable, and fruits. The consumption of this rotting food frequently leads to intestinal and digestive problems for Churequeros. Because there used to be a slaughterhouse across the lagoon which merges with La Chureca, remains of farm animals pollute the land, water, and air in and surrounding La Chureca. In addition, much of the garbage from La Chureca often spills over into Lake Managua, affecting its natural resources. Fish from Lake Managua are an important part of the diet of the population living in poverty at lakeshore yet, there have been high levels of mercury found in native fish species in Lake Managua.

== Planned demolition and status ==
There are a number of international organizations and NGOs that have been working in La Chureca for a number of years. Many of these organizations have succeeded in building community centers, community libraries, and schools. Some of these NGOs include: ProNica-Quakers in Solidarity with Nicaraguans, Iglesia De Avivamiento Pentecostal (I.D.A.P), Los Quinchos, Project Chacocente, Colegio Cristiano La Esperanza, Mision Cristiana Corazones Abierto, Austin Samaritans and Manna Project International (MPI) work with a local NGO FUNJOFUDESS and sponsor the only health clinic in La Chureca: Casa Base de Salud, Children's Smile and Hope Association, NICA, Catholic Youth Advocates, Inc. and HOPE. In August 2007, radical change got underway in La Chureca due to a visit by María Teresa Fernández de la Vega, the Vice President of Spain’s government, during an official visit to Nicaragua. A few months after the Vice President's visit, the AECID (the Spanish Agency of International Development Collaborations), revealed a 30 million Euro integral development project for La Chureca. This is a three part project which includes: firstly, closing down the existing dumpster; secondly, creating a new alternative recycling industry for the waste; and thirdly, housing and social integration alternatives for those living or working in or around La Chureca. The idea of the project is to bring dignity to people. This project is seen as a threat to many of the people working in La Chureca because many of them are scared of being left without any means of livelihood.
