= Tyler Menezes =

Canadian-American computer programmer (born 1992)

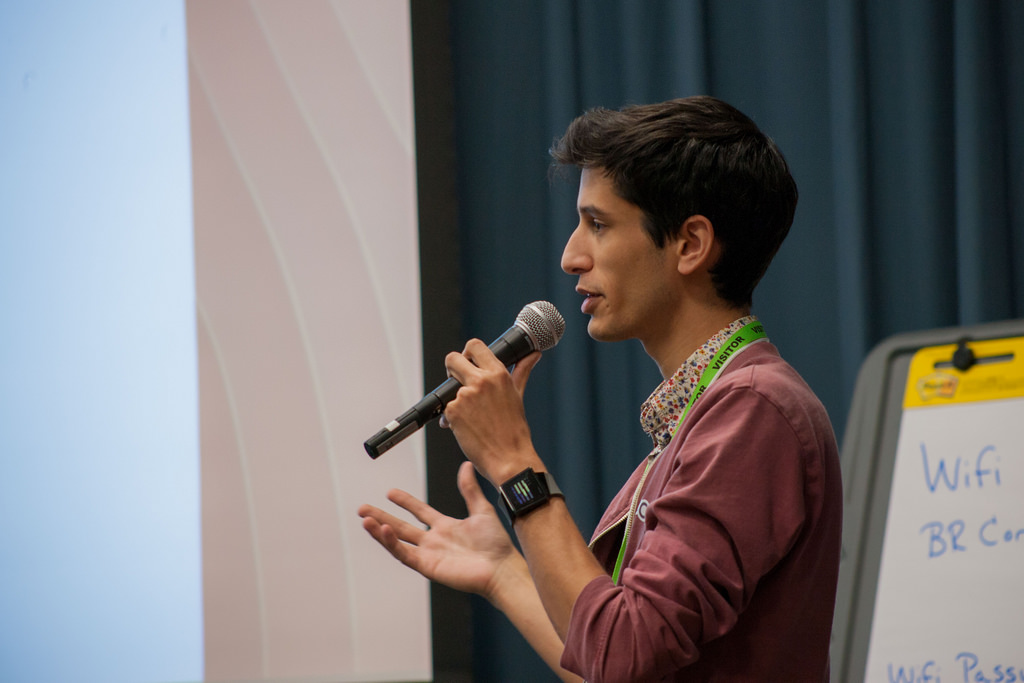
- Menezes speaking at CodeDay in Atlanta, 2017
- Born: July 10, 1992 (age 34); Toronto, Ontario
- Education: University of Washington, Y Combinator
- Occupation: Executive director at CodeDay
- Known for: CodeDay
- Website: tyler.vc

Tyler Menezes is a Canadian–American computer programmer and businessperson. He co-founded several startups, and is currently executive director of the nonprofit organization CodeDay.

== Early life and education ==
Menezes was born in Toronto, Ontario, and moved to Spokane, Washington, when he was young.

He has stated that his interest in technology started during a period of long social isolation while living in Spokane and being uninterested in sports like the rest of his classmates. He was introduced to computer programming after moving to Redmond, Washington, when he stumbled on a book offering to teach the creation of a slot machine in Visual Basic.

Menezes has said his later interest in STEM education was a result of realizing his luck in finding that book at that particular time.

In high school, Menezes participated in a video game programming competition organized by Microsoft, which would later serve as the inspiration for the CodeDay program.

Menezes worked on CAPTCHA research in Microsoft Research's Machine Learning and Applied Statistics department while attending the University of Washington.

== Career ==
In early 2012, he dropped out of university to create a startup focused on live video streaming, and in mid-2012 he moved to East Palo Alto, California to attend Y Combinator for it. In 2013 the startup switched its focus to providing live video infrastructure as a service.

During his time in the technology sector, Menezes was volunteering at CodeDay (then StudentRND), a not-for-profit headed by Edward Jiang which operated a 3,500 sq.ft. makerspace in Bellevue, Washington. As a volunteer he helped start the CodeDay event. In 2013 he left the startup to join CodeDay and in 2014 became the executive director of CodeDay. Speaking to Forbes about this career change, he stated "There was this huge inequity in Silicon Valley. People were working on big problems but they weren’t necessarily serving a lot of the U.S. population who come from marginalized, lower-income backgrounds.". He was profiled during this period in the book Be a Changemaker: How to Start Something That Matters.

Menezes has become known for eating KitKat candy bars without splitting them into pieces in all his videos and many students have created satirical games as a result.

Additionally, he is a programmer and is the author and maintainer of several open-source projects.

== Work in education ==
Menezes' work in education is focused on educational motivation. He has said he believes that creativity and excitement are important to motivate students, and that schools have ignored this when teaching STEM disciplines, resulting in inequity in the technology industry.

Menezes has stated he focuses on computing as a useful way to increase equality. In an interview with Tech&Learning Magazine he is quoted as saying of programming "It takes almost no resources, it creates wealth, and it’s very empowering."

== Recognition ==
Menezes was recognized in 425 Magazine's "30 Under 30" in 2015, as a Game Changer and Most Inspiring in EdTech by Tech&Learning Magazine, and by Forbes Magazine as a top "30 Under 30" and "Canada Under 30 Innovators You Need to Know".
