= Porfirio Meneses Lazón =

Porfirio Meneses Lazón (Huanta, 1915 – Lima, 2009) was a Peruvian author famous for his writings in Quechua.

A collection of Lazón's Quechua stories were published in a bilingual edition in French as Contes du Lever du Jour (2001). He was the author of two collections of Quechua poems, Suyaypa Llaqtan (1988) and Yapa Tinkunakuy (2009); 30 sonnets with Spanish translations; and a collection of Quechua stories, Achikyay Willaykuna (1998). He translated César Vallejo's poetry (Los Heraldos Negros) into Quechua.
