= Antonio Martínez Ron =

Spanish journalist and science writer (born 1976)

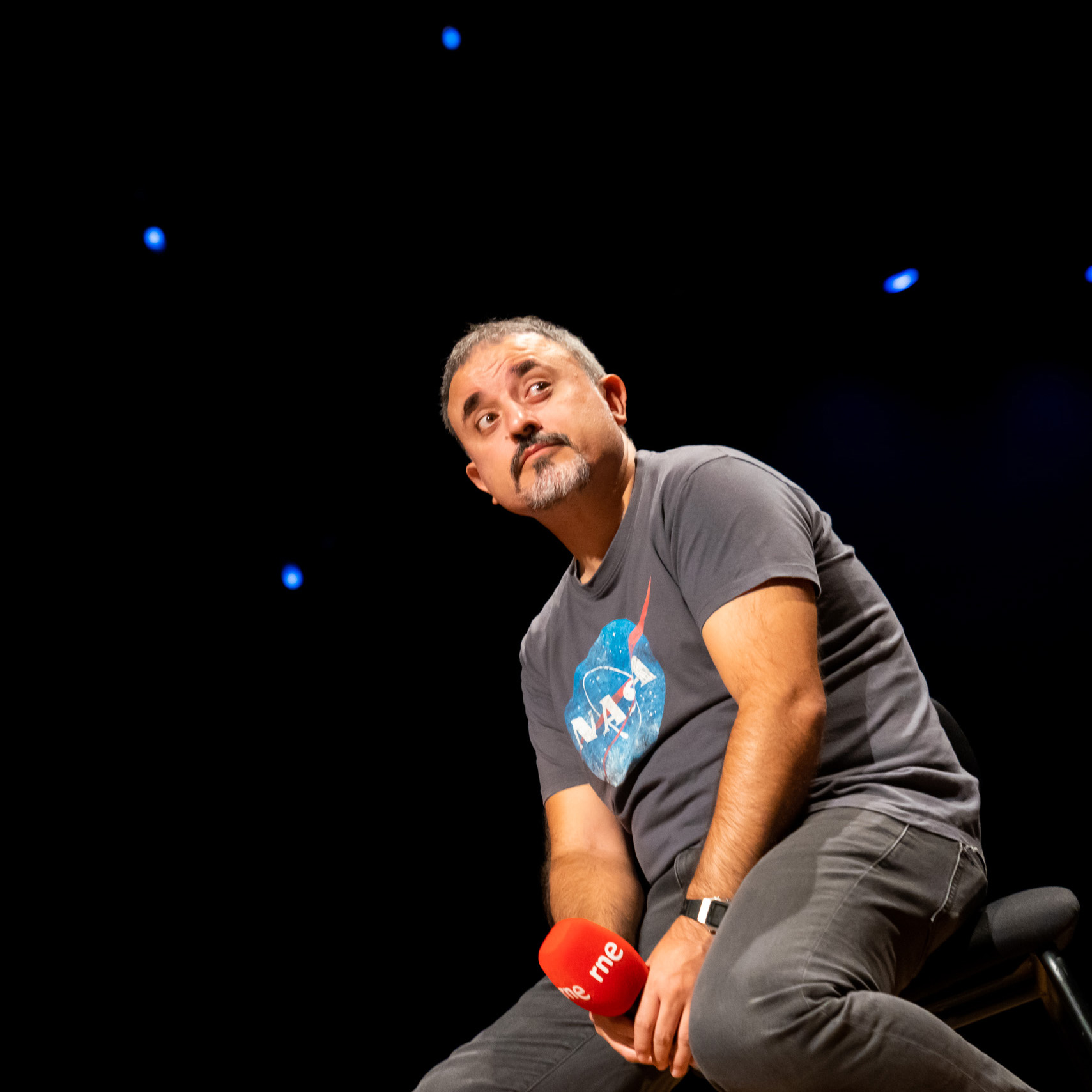
- Born: 3 May 1976; Madrid
- Education: Complutense University of Madrid
- Occupations: Writer, science journalist

Antonio Martínez Ron (born 3 May 1976 in Madrid) is a Spanish journalist and scientific reporter. He's graduated in journalism from the Universidad Complutense de Madrid. He has collaborated in different media such as Cadena SER, La2 and RNE. He is also responsible for the digital projects of scientific dissemination Naukas and Fogonazos. In 2015 he presented his first book "¿Qué ven los astronautas cuando cierran los ojos?" And in 2016 he published "El ojo desnudo".

He has been awarded several prizes in recognition of his scientific work, such as the Bitácoras Awards or the 20Blog Awards. As director of the documentary El mal del cerebro, he won the 2013 Boehringer Award for best journalism work; This documentary received a review of the British magazine The Lancet.

== Biography ==
He holds a degree in journalism from the Complutense University of Madrid (UCM) and works as editor in the Science section of the digital newspaper Vozpopuli in April 2017. He is also an active contributor to Quo magazine and the program "I give you my word" (Spanish: Te doy mi palabra) on the radio channel Onda Cero. Between 2009 and 2011 he worked as chief editor of science in lainformación.com.

In September 2003 he published the blog Fogonazos, where he writes a compilation of his "daily astonnments", articles on science, curiosities and current impressions of the same.

In La 2 de Televisión Española (transl. Spanish Television) he presented the section The demonstration (Spanish: La demostración, a space designed to explain concepts of physics, chemistry and neuroscience through simple experiments, in the program Orbita Laika, presented by Ángel Martín.

On 28 December 2009, he published in Fogonazos an article entitled National Geographic destapa el fraude de Stonehenge. In it he claimed that 90% of the stones of Stonehenge had been placed in successive "restorations", that is to say, a montage. He accompanied this article with photographic evidence and narrated how archaeologist Mike Parker Pearson had discovered that several of the dolerite rocks contained a variety of feldspar that had nothing to do with those located in Perseli, where the oldest megaliths were extracted. What was a joke for the day of the innocent took immediate relevance internationally and National Geographic had to intervene to deny it.

He is one of the creators of Naukas, an online scientific outreach platform, in which he is also a publisher. It has been active since 2010 and has more than 150 collaborators, mostly scientists and disseminators. This network has held outreach events in cities such as A Coruña and Bilbao.

In 2014 he created together with Javier Peláez and Javier Álvarez the radio project "Ultraviolet Catastrophe". This series of programs seeks to promote science through various fields of knowledge, showing experiments and speaking with their creators. He also published his first book, ¿Qué ven los astronautas cuando cierran los ojos? (transl. What see the astronauts when they close the eyes?, a compilation of more than fifty stories published in the Fogonazos blog. It deals with topics such as astronaut experiences and neuroscience stories. It is also available for free in electronic version.

In 2016 he published The Naked Eye (Crítica, Drakontos Collection), a reconstruction of the history of science from the understanding of vision and light, through a critical vision, storytelling and illustration of scientific experiments.

In 2017 the Academia de las Ciencias y las Artes de Televisión of Spain grants to him the Scientific Journalism Award Concha García Campoy in the category of Digital Press for the article Plasticidad a la carta para salvar cerebros.

== Work ==
El mal del cerebro

He directed the documentary El mal del cerebro, which reviews major research on the treatment of brain diseases and improved mental performance.

In the first part of this documentary, Brains repaired, Martinez Ron attends an electrode implant operation for the recovery of mobility and elimination of compulsive tremor in Parkinson's patients. Shows the latest advances in technology to replace limbs amputated by bionic devices or move objects with thought.

In the second part, In search of memory, talks about the new methods of investigation to try to detect early dementia and to stop the cognitive deterioration, it is looked for how to retain the memories the maximum possible time.

In the third part, Trastornos de la mente, presents some disorders of the mind as the ezquizophrenia, the syndrome of Gilles de la Tourette, a case of amnesia by brain damage and several patients with aphasia triggered by cerebrovascular accidents.

=== Books ===
- "¿Qué ven los astronautas cuando cierran los ojos?" (2014)
- "El ojo desnudo" (2016)
- "Door" (2017)

=== Periodicals ===
- Editor in the Science section of Vozpopuli.com.
- Creator of Fogonazos and Naukas.
- Contributor in Yahoo!, Jot Down and the magazine Quo.
- Ex-editor in the Science section of lainformacion.com.
- Ex-editor in ADN.es.

=== Media ===
- Director of the documentary El mal del cerebro.
- Collaborator of Orbit Laika (TVE) in the section "The demonstration" during 2 seasons.
- Collaborator in Onda Cero's "Te doy mi palabra" program.
- Creator of the podcast Catástrofe ultravioleta.

=== Awards ===
- Boehringer Award for Medical Journalism 2013.
- Prismas 2012 Award.
- Bitácoras Award 2010 and 2011.
- 20Blogs 2007 and 2008.
- Blasillo Award to the ingenuity in Internet 2012.
- Scientific Journalism Award Concha García Campoy 2017.
- Ondas Award to the podcast Catástrofe Ultravioleta 2017.
