= Bruno Menezes =

Brazilian footballer (born 1984)

Bruno Marques Menezes
Personal information
- Full name: Bruno Marques Menezes
- Date of birth: March 20, 1984 (age 42)
- Place of birth: Santos, Brazil
- Height: 1.77 m (5 ft 10 in)
- Position: Defender

Youth career
- 2002: Mogi Mirim

Senior career*
Years	Team	Apps	(Gls)
2002–2005	Mogi Mirim		
2006	União São João		
2007	São Carlos		
2007–2008	Chicago Fire	3	(0)
2008	Miami FC		
2009	ASA		
2010	Cuiabá		
2010	Marília		
2011	Cuiabá		
- * Club domestic league appearances and goals

Bruno Marques Menezes (born March 20, 1984) is a Brazilian footballer who last played for Cuiabá Esporte Clube. He formerly played with Major League Soccer side Chicago Fire. He is primarily utilized on the right side.

Menezes has spent his first five years as a professional in the Campeonato Paulista. He began his youth career with local club Mogi Mirim. Upon turning professional with that club, Menezes played first team football for the next three years, leaving the club in 2005 for another São Paulo club: União São João. After a season with the Macaws, he then joined São Carlos where he again played first-team football.

After an already lengthy career in his home country, Menezes opted for the United States, signing for the Chicago Fire in Major League Soccer on June 30, 2007. He was upgraded from the developmental to the senior roster early in the 2008 season, but was waived on May 7.
