= Antonio Martínez Aneiros =

Spanish politician (1933–2026)

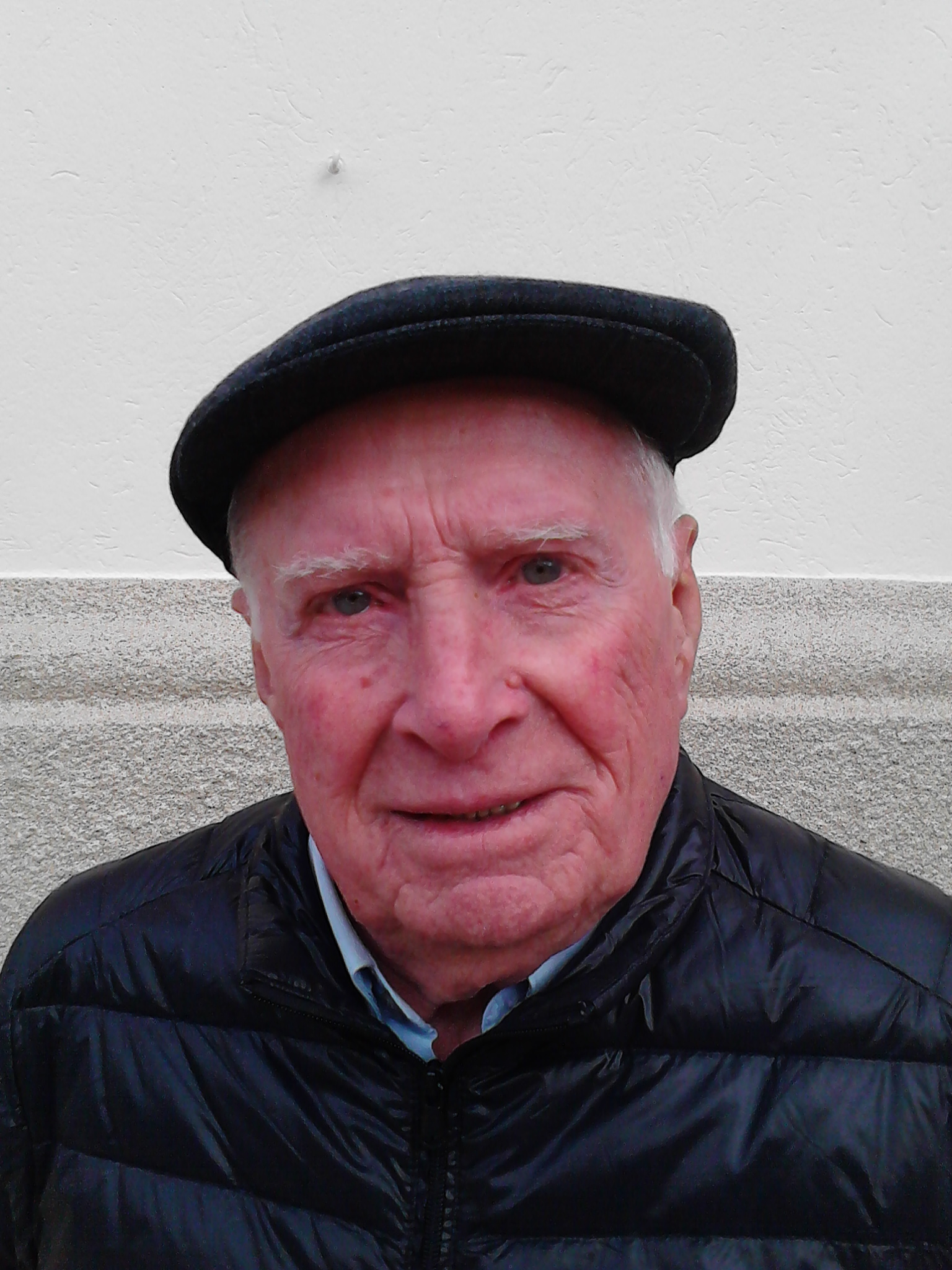
- Martínez in 2018

Member of the Parliament of Galicia for A Coruña
- In office 17 December 1985 – 24 October 1989

Mayor of Narón
- In office 19 April 1979 – 13 December 1985

Personal details
- Born: 3 June 1933 Narón, Spain
- Died: 19 July 2026 (aged 93) Narón, Spain
- Party: PSG-EG
- Occupation: Priest

Antonio Martínez Aneiros (3 June 1933 – 19 July 2026) was a Spanish politician. A member of the Galician Socialist Party–Galician Left, he served in the Parliament of Galicia from 1985 to 1989. He previously served as mayor of Narón 1979 to 1985.

He was a priest affiliated with the progressive Somos Igrexa movement. In 1972 he was arrested under suspicion of communism for his work with the Catholic charity group Caritas Spain.

Martínez died in Narón on 19 July 2026, at the age of 93.
