= DSQ Software =

Defunct Indian software company

DSQ Software Ltd
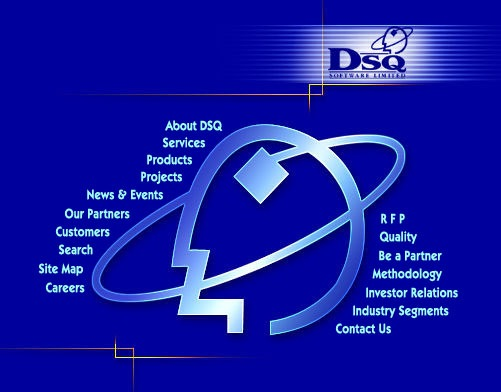
- Formerly: Square D Software Ltd
- Type: Publicly listed traded
- Traded as: NSE: SQRDSFWARE; (archive)
- Industry: IT Services
- Founded: 1992 in Chennai, Tamil Nadu, India
- Founder: Dinesh Dalmia
- Defunct: 2004
- Fate: Defunct (Services and operations were privately sold in 2002)
- Successor: Scandent Solutions, later became Cambridge Solutions, acquired by Xchanging Plc, acquired by CSC now operating as DXC Technology
- Headquarters: Chennai, India
- Area served: International
- Number of employees: 2000+ (2001)

DSQ Software Ltd, established in 1992 and headquartered in Chennai (formerly Madras), India was a publicly listed IT and software services consulting company, mainly operated overseas with its base in India. DSQ was in the top league of Indian IT companies that operated abroad during the tech-boom of 1990s and mainly catered to demands from western markets for project services, technical manpower and IT skills. The company was first known as Square D Software Ltd and changed its name to DSQ Software in 1997.

The company offered service offerings in mainframe and midrange computing, telecommunications, CAD, and various other IT service areas. DSQ had clients in US, Europe and the Asia-Pacific region. In 2000, it employed around 2000 people and reported revenues in the region of $60m. Hewitt Associates, a leading US based human resources consultancy firm valued the human resources capital of DSQ at $1bn. DSQ had an impressive list of international clients and it posted year-on-year increasing revenues until 2000. In 2000, DSQ was also the first to establish itself as an application service provider, providing Internet based services and operating from India via DSQworld.com.

From 2002 onwards, DSQ's market presence diminished when its lucrative operations and client service contract agreements were sold to a privately held company. DSQ shares were suspended in 2001 and its India operations ceased in 2002. 2003 saw DSQ's collapse, with minimal business activities. Between 2001-2004, DSQ continued to trade under various renamed entities based in the UK, with reported group revenues of £76m GBP for year ending March 2004. The US entity accounted over 98% of reported group revenue for the 2004 financial year, which coincides with promoter's physical presence in the US. The company was called AllServe Systems Plc when it entered administration in November 2004 and liquidation was completed in 2010. DSQ Software is operationally dormant, as per the trading information submitted for the year 2005 at BSE. The public holding in DSQ Software was over 70% and it had an equity capital of over ₹300 million.

== Promoter-led issues ==
Dinesh Dalmia, the company's founder, promoter and managing director, became entangled in a series of share market controversies in relation to various partisan share allotments and transfers of equity made by DSQ between 1998 and 2001. Dalmia fled from India to the US sometime in 2003 and, in 2006, was arrested in Delhi, India, on various fraud charges. It was later established that Dalmia had been in the United States from 2003 to 2006, trying to perpetuate fraud in the computer equipment leasing market by setting up businesses using fake names and purportedly money laundering. He was constantly seen in the New Brunswick area of New Jersey, driving luxury cars and often eating at Udipi Cafe. He was indicted in 2006 by the FBI in the United States on multiple charges of fraud. However, in 2011, he was released on bail in all cases in India. There are rumors that he has also entered into a settlement in the United States. Some social commentators see the lack of corporate governance as a part of a broader problem relating to India's family-owned corporate environment. DSQ is cited in the list of major corporate scams of India, along with the Satyam scandal.

In October 2013, SEBI barred Dinesh Dalmia and DSQ Software for a period of 7 further years. In Jan 2019, SEBI further imposed a ₹1 crore fine for failing to comply with its directions. In 2024, a corporate fraud investigation revealed that Dalmia's name had appeared in another alleged scam, purportedly using fake company names to secure and default on bank loans in the dairy export business.
