= Vidaluz Meneses =

Nicaraguan poet and social activist

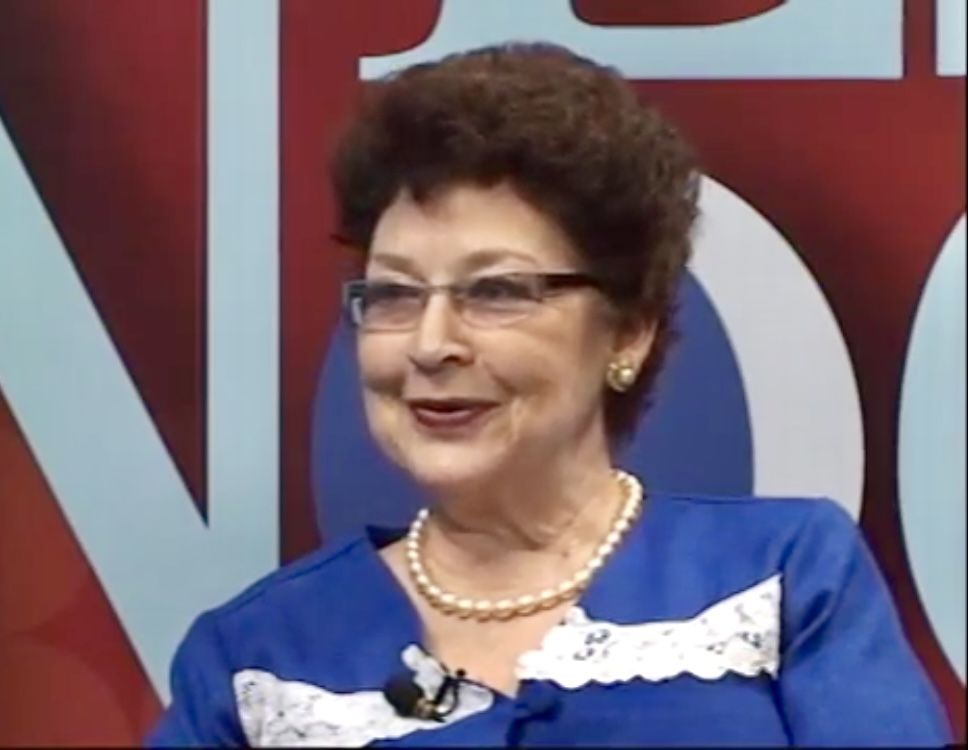
- Vidaluz Meneses in 2013
- Born: Vidaluz Meneses Robleto; 28 May 1944; Managua, Nicaragua
- Died: 27 July 2016 (aged 72); Nicaragua
- Education: Central American University
- Parents: Edmundo Meneses Cantarero (father); Vida Robleto Valle (mother)
- Awards: Latino Book Award (2013); Chevalier of the Legion of Honor (2014)

Vidaluz Meneses Robleto (28 May 1944 – 27 July 2016) was a Nicaraguan librarian, poet, academic, and social activist.

== Biography ==
Vidaluz Meneses Robleto was the daughter of Vida Robleto Valle and General Edmundo Meneses Cantarero. She attended the Colegio La Asunción for Baccalaureate studies, and joined the Sandinista National Liberation Front in 1977. She held a bachelor's degree in humanities with a minor in library science from Central American University, and became a dean of its Faculty of Arts and Letters. She was co-founder of the Nicaraguan Association of Writers (ANIDE) and its first president. She also chaired its board at various times, the last from 2007 to 2009. She was director of the Nicaraguan chapter of PEN International.

Along with Gioconda Belli, Michele Najlis, and Daisy Zamora, Meneses is considered to be one of the most prominent Nicaraguan poets of the 1970s.

In 2013 she won the International Latino Book Award for her bilingual poetry book Flame in the Air (Llama guardada), and in 2014 she received the Order of Chevalier of the Legion of Honor of France for her contribution to arts and letters. Her work was translated into six languages. It includes Llama en el Aire – Antología poética 1974 al 1990 (1991), Literatura para niños en Nicaragua (1995), the poetry book Todo es igual y distinto (2004), and the anthologies Sonreír cuando los ojos están serios and La lucha es el más alto de los cantos, both in 2006.

Vidaluz Meneses Robleto died on 27 July 2016 at the age of 72.

== Books ==
- 1974 – Llama guardada
- 1982 – El Aire que me llama
- 1991 – Llama en el Aire – Antología poética 1974 al 1990
- 1995 – Literatura para niños en Nicaragua
- 2005 – Todo es igual y distinto
- 2006 – Sonreír cuando los ojos están serios
- 2006 – La lucha es el más alto de los cantos
- 2013 – Flame in the Air (Llama guardada)

== Awards ==
- 2013 – International Latino Book Award
- 2014 – Chevalier of the Legion of Honor
