= Victor Menezes =

Indian-American banker (1947–2025)

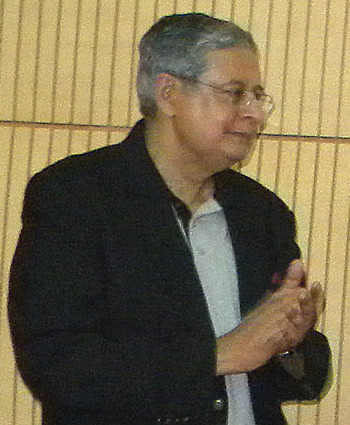
- Menezes in 2011
- Born: Victor Joseph Menezes; May 14, 1947; Poona, British India
- Died: February 3, 2025 (aged 77); Miami, Florida, U.S.
- Citizenship: United States
- Education: IIT Bombay; MIT Sloan School of Management (MBA)
- Occupation: Banker
- Spouse: Tara Anne Fonseca
- Parent: Manuel Menezes (father)
- Relatives: Ivan Menezes (brother)

Victor Joseph Menezes (May 14, 1947 – February 3, 2025) was an Indian-American banker. He began his career in 1972 by joining the American financial services company Citicorp (now Citigroup) in corporate banking and went on to serve as the Senior Vice Chairman of Citigroup, working for the company for 32 years until his retirement.

== Early life ==
Victor Joseph Menezes was born in Poona, British India on 14 May 1947, the son of Manuel Menezes, who was the chairman of the Indian Railway Board. His younger brother Ivan Menezes was CEO of Diageo. He received his degree in electrical engineering from the Indian Institute of Technology, Bombay in 1970. He received an MBA from the MIT Sloan School of Management in 1972.

== Career ==
In 1972, Menezes joined Citicorp in Corporate Banking. Later, he was posted in "practically every continent" – as one bio-sketch put it. He rose to the post of chief financial officer in 1995. He retired from Citigroup as senior vice chairman after a 32-year global career there. Until his death, he chaired the Advisory Board for Citi India. He was senior adviser of New Silk Route, an international private equity firm. Menezes chaired the American India Foundation, was a vice chairman of the Asia Society and of Catholic Charities in New York. He chaired the executive committee of the Eisenhower Fellowships. He was a board member of Educational Testing Service and the MIT Corporation and was on the advisory boards of IIT, Indian School of Business (ISB), MIT Sloan and INSEAD. He has a convention centre named after him at the Indian Institute of Technology Bombay known as the Victor Menezes Convention Centre (VMCC) which was inaugurated by Mr. Kapil Sibal on 8 January 2011.

Menezes was the chairman of the Clearing House Association; served as a trustee of the Asia Society, the Eisenhower Fellowships and the American India Foundation. He was named chairman of the board of governors of the National Center for Asia Pacific Economic Cooperation (APEC). He was a member of Citigroup's Management Committee and Business Heads Committee. The IIT Bombay called Menezes its "product" who reached the highest levels of banking and finance.

== 2022 Insider trading charge ==
The Securities and Exchange Commission alleged in its complaint that on 28 March 2002, as part of a cashless exercise transaction, Menezes exercised 825,960 Citigroup stock options and sold 597,000 of the resulting shares at a price of $49.99 per share to cover the taxes and costs of the option exercise. As part of the transaction, Menezes retained 228,960 shares. The complaint alleged that, at the time of this transaction, Menezes was in possession of material, nonpublic information regarding Citigroup's plan to report first-quarter 2002 losses totalling hundreds of millions of dollars related to the company's Argentine operations, which Menezes supervised. According to the complaint, Menezes was also aware that Citigroup would miss consensus earnings estimates for the quarter. The final judgement required Menezes to pay $1,567,557 of disgorgement, pre-judgment interest of $328,822.77 and a $783,778 civil penalty, for a total payment of $2,680,157.77.

== Death ==
Menezes died in Miami, Florida on 3 February 2025, at the age of 77.
