= Tara Anne Fonseca =

Indian model

- Born: Bangalore, Karnataka, India
- Occupation: Model
- Height: 173 cm (5 ft 8 in)
- Spouse: Victor Menezes
- Beauty pageant titleholder
- Title: Miss Navy Queen 1972; Miss Asia Pacific 1973
- Major competition: Miss Navy Queen 1972

Tara Anne Fonseca is an Indian model and beauty pageant titleholder who won the Miss Asia Pacific 1973 contest. She was the second Indian to win the title, after Zeenat Aman in 1970.

== Early and personal life ==
Fonseca was born in Bangalore, Karnataka.

She married Victor Menezes, an engineer and banker.

== Career ==
Fonesca was the second runner-up of the annual Femina Miss India competition in 1973. Coming in third in the competition gave her access to participate in the Miss Asia Pacific contest of 1973. She was crowned Miss Asia Pacific 1973 by outgoing titleholder Janet Coutts of Australia at the end of the event. Fourteen countries participated in the event held on May 31, 1973, in Manila, Philippines.
