= Antonio Martínez de Meneses =

Spanish playwright (c. 1612–1661)

Antonio Martínez de Meneses (c. 1612 – 1661) was a playwright of the Spanish Golden Age.
