= Fair and Accurate Credit Transactions Act =

U.S. federal law

- Other short titles: Financial Literacy and Education Improvement Act
- Long title: An Act to amend the Fair Credit Reporting Act, to prevent identity theft, improve resolution of consumer disputes, improve the accuracy of consumer records, make improvements in the use of, and consumer access to, credit information, and for other purposes.
- Acronyms (colloquial): FACTA, FLEIA
- Nicknames: Fair and Accurate Credit Transactions Act of 2003
- Enacted by: the 108th United States Congress
- Effective: December 4, 2003

Citations
- Public law: 108-159
- Statutes at Large: 117 Stat. 1952

Codification
- Acts amended: Fair Credit Reporting Act
- Titles amended: 15 U.S.C.: Commerce and Trade
- U.S.C. sections amended: 15 U.S.C. ch. 41, subch. I § 1601 et seq.; 15 U.S.C. ch. 41, subch. III § 1681 et seq.

Legislative history
- Introduced in the House as H.R. 2622 by Spencer Bachus (R-AL) on June 26, 2003; Committee consideration by House Financial Services, Senate Banking, Housing, and Urban Affairs; Passed the House on September 10, 2003 (392-30, Roll call vote 499, via Clerk.House.gov); Passed the Senate on November 5, 2003 (95-2, Roll call vote 437, via Senate.gov); Reported by the joint conference committee on November 21, 2003; agreed to by the House on November 21, 2003 (379-49, Roll call vote 667, via Clerk.House.gov) and by the Senate on November 22, 2003 (agreed unanimous consent); Signed into law by President George W. Bush on December 4, 2003

The Fair and Accurate Credit Transactions Act of 2003 (FACT Act or FACTA, Pub. L. 108–159 (text) (PDF)) is a U.S. federal law, passed by the United States Congress on November 22, 2003, and signed by President George W. Bush on December 4, 2003, as an amendment to the Fair Credit Reporting Act. The act allows consumers to request and obtain a free credit report once every 12 months from each of the three nationwide consumer credit reporting companies (Equifax, Experian, and TransUnion). In cooperation with the Federal Trade Commission, the three major credit reporting agencies set up the web site AnnualCreditReport.com to provide free access to annual credit reports.

The act also contains provisions to help reduce identity theft, such as the ability for individuals to place alerts on their credit histories if identity theft is suspected, or if deploying overseas in the military, thereby making fraudulent applications for credit more difficult. Further, it requires secure disposal of consumer information.

== Provisions ==
The FACT Act contains seven major titles: Identity Theft Prevention and Credit History Restoration, Improvements in Use of and Consumer Access to Credit Information, Enhancing the Accuracy of Consumer Report Information, Limiting the Use and Sharing of Medical Information in the Financial System, Financial Literacy and Education Improvement, Protecting Employee Misconduct Investigations, and Relation to State Laws.

=== Identity Theft Prevention and Credit History Restoration ===
This title of the act contains provisions that deal mainly with the prevention of identity theft. In particular, it establishes new regulations concerning 'fraud alerts' and 'active duty alerts', establishes new limitations on the printing of customers' credit card numbers on receipts, and prescribes that new regulations be established by certain government agencies regarding the detection of identity theft by financial institutions and creditors.

==== Fraud alerts ====
The title requires that consumer reporting agencies, upon the request of a consumer who believes he is or about to be a victim of fraud or any other related crime, must place a fraud alert on that consumer's file for at least 90 days, and notify all other consumer reporting agencies of the fraud alert.

Consumers may request an extended fraud alert, in which case requires the reporting agency to disclose this fraud alert in any credit score that it issues for the consumer during a seven-year period. An extended alert also requires the reporting agency to exclude the consumer from any list distributed to third parties for the purpose of extending credit or offering insurance to that consumer.

The title also provides for any active duty member to request an active duty alert, which requires the reporting agency to disclose such alert with any credit report issued within 12 months of the request and to exclude the active duty member from any list distributed to third parties for the purpose of extending credit or offering insurance for two years from the request.

==== Truncation of credit and debit card numbers ====
The act also prohibits businesses from printing more than five digits of any customer's card number or card expiration date on any receipt provided to the cardholder at the point of sale or transaction. This provision is enforced with statutory damages ranging from $100 to $1000 per violation, and when claims are aggregated in a class action (brought by all the customers of a retailer that failed to truncate credit card numbers) the amount of damages can be massive. The provision excludes receipts that are handwritten or imprinted, where the only method of recording the credit card number is by such means. The act did not become effective for three years after its enactment for any cash register manufactured before January 1, 2005, and did not become effective for one year after its enactment for any cash register manufactured after January 1, 2005.

==== Identification of possible identity theft (Red Flags rule) ====
The act established the Red Flags Rule, which required the federal banking agencies, the National Credit Union Administration, and the Federal Trade Commission to jointly create regulations regarding identity theft prevention applicable to financial institutions and creditors. The Red Flags Rule also addresses how card issuers must respond to changes of address. Regulations that were established as a result include:

- One that requires financial institutions or creditors to develop and implement an Identity Theft Prevention Program in connection with both new and existing accounts. The Program must include reasonable policies and procedures for detecting, preventing, and mitigating identity theft;
- Another that requires users of consumer reports to respond to Notices of Address Discrepancies that they receive; and
- A third that places special requirements on issuers of debit or credit cards to assess the validity of a change of address if they receive notification of a change of address for a consumer's debit or credit card account and, within a short period of time afterward they receive a request for an additional or replacement card for the same account.

Another key item was the requirement that mortgage lenders provide consumers with a Credit Disclosure Notice that included their credit scores, range of scores, credit bureaus, scoring models, and factors affecting their scores. This form is typically available from credit reporting agencies, and many will send this directly to the consumer on the lenders' behalf.

===== Confusion with the scope of the Red Flags rule =====
Financial institutions faced a mandatory deadline of November 1, 2008, to comply with the Red Flags Rule, section 114 and 315 of the Fair and Accurate Credit Transactions (FACT) Act. However, due to widespread confusion over coverage under the act, specifically whether the term "creditor" applies to particular businesses, members of Congress repeatedly requested that FTC postpone the deadline for compliance with Section 315 until after December 31, 2010.

According to a Business Alert issued by the Federal Trade Commission in June 2008, the Red Flags Rule applies to a very broad list of businesses including "financial institutions" and "creditors" with "covered accounts". A "creditor" is defined to include "lenders such as banks, finance companies, automobile dealers, mortgage brokers, utility companies and telecommunications companies". However, this is not an all-inclusive list.

The regulations apply to all businesses that have "covered accounts". A "covered account" includes any account for which there is a foreseeable risk of identity theft. For example, credit cards, monthly billed accounts like utility bills or cell phone bills, social security numbers, drivers license numbers, medical insurance accounts, and many others. This significantly expands the definition to include all companies, regardless of size, that maintain, or otherwise possess, consumer information for a business purpose. Because of the broad definitions in these regulations, few businesses will be able to escape these requirements.

=== Protection and restoration of identity theft victim credit history ===
==== Summary of rights of identity theft victims ====
Provisions in this title require that the Federal Trade Commission, in consultation with the Federal banking agencies and the National Credit Union Agency, "prepare a model summary of the rights of consumers ... with respect to the procedures for remedying the effects of fraud or identity theft...". Beginning sixty days after the summary of these rights were established, all reporting agencies are required to provide a copy of this summary to any consumer that contacts an agency and states that he believes he has been a victim of fraud or identity theft.

==== Blocking of information resulting from identity theft ====
The Act also requires any reporting agency to block the reporting of any information in a consumer's file that the consumer identifies as information that originated from an alleged identity theft. Such agency must block the information within four days of receiving proof, a copy of an identity theft report, the identification of the information by the consumer, and a statement from the consumer that the information is not a result of any transaction he participated in.

Agencies are not required to block any information (and may rescind any existing blocks) in the case that the block was found to be made in error or based on erroneous information as provided by the consumer, or that the consumer "obtained possession of goods, services, or money as a result of the blocked transaction or transactions.

==== Coordination of identity theft complaint investigations ====
This section requires that all consumer reporting agencies develop a means of communicating to each other consumer complaints regarding fraud or identity theft, or requests for fraud alerts or blocks. Furthermore, the section requires that each consumer reporting agency release a report each year to the Federal Trade Commission of fraud alert requests and complaints involving fraud or identity theft received by the reporting agency. Finally, the section requires the Federal Trade Commission to set up a means by which consumers can contact the reporting agencies and creditors with a complaint involving identity theft or fraud.

== Criticism ==
After its enactment, some consumer advocacy groups criticized the FACT Act claiming that it preempts some stricter and already-existing state regulations, and provides exceptions that are 'far too generous' to new regulations regarding disclosure of personal information by banks as found in the act. Furthermore, an article in The Washington Post criticized the difficulty in retrieving the credit reports in some of the states that were first eligible under the act.

=== Preemption of state laws ===
Vermont, Colorado, Georgia, Maine, Maryland, Massachusetts, New Jersey, and California had all established laws by 1994 requiring credit bureaus to provide a free credit report on demand. However, according to U.S. Pirg, "[w]ith the FACT Act, the financial industry won its primary goal: permanent preemption of stronger state credit and privacy laws." Specifically, state laws are preempted in certain areas, such as the content of a consumer report, the responsibilities of "furnishers", responses of consumer reporting agencies to disputes over inaccurate information (although there is an exception for statutes in place before 1996), and duties of those who take an adverse action based on a report.

=== Difficulty in obtaining credit reports ===
An article dated March 13, 2005 and published in The Washington Post stated that while "[r]esidents of six East Coast states—Maryland, Georgia, Maine, Massachusetts, New Jersey and Vermont—are already eligible for free reports from all three agencies as a result of state laws", the phone numbers provided to request these reports connected to automated systems that the article described as "maddening in their complexity and unforgiving if your circumstances vary from the system's programming." Furthermore, the article criticised automated systems for forcing consumers to "navigate a thicket of recorded information -- including sales pitches for their products, such as a credit 'score' (an evaluation of your creditworthiness) or a 'monitoring' service to help guard against identity theft". Since 2012, the Consumer Financial Protection Bureau (CFPB) has published a list of consumer reporting agencies (CRAs). It enables consumers to see which CRAs might be important to them and gives them the contact information of each CRA in the list, so consumers can more easily order their personal consumer reports. Many of the CRAs in the list provide personal reports to consumers for free. The 2016 edition of the list is available on the CFPB's website here.

=== The Red Flag rule as a cause of identity theft ===
As the Red Flag rule widely defines creditors, many businesses (such as utilities) are now required to collect personal information (such as SSN and driver's license numbers) that they do not need and have no use for. This policy is precisely contrary to the FTC's advice to consumers that they should disclose their social security number to companies only when absolutely necessary. This aspect of the Red Flag rule has the unintended consequences of increasing the number of businesses that hold consumers' Social Security numbers, thereby putting consumers at greater risk for identity theft through data theft.

=== Mass Lawsuits for Including Expiration Date on Printed Receipts ===
The Act prohibits merchants from including credit- and debit-card expiration dates on electronically printed receipts. When the Act went into effect in 2004, courts received massive amounts of expiration date lawsuits, all federal circuit to have expressly considered the issue now refuse to hear related class-action lawsuits. In 2008 Congress passed the Credit and Debit Card Receipt Clarification Act (Clarification Act), which made merchants who printed expiration dates on receipts, but otherwise complied with the Act, to not in willful noncompliance up to June 3, 2008. In the Clarification Act, Congress found that "Experts in the field agree that proper truncation of the card number, by itself ... regardless of the inclusion of the expiration date, prevents a potential fraudster from perpetrating identity theft or credit card fraud." However, despite court rulings and the Clarification Act, the text of the Act remains largely unchanged regarding expiration dates on receipts after June 3, 2008.

== See also ==
- Fair Credit Reporting Act
- Policy and Economic Research Council—think tank that did much of the research on FACTA
- Securities regulation in the United States
- Commodity Futures Trading Commission
- Securities commission
- Chicago Stock Exchange
- Financial regulation
- NASDAQ
- New York Stock Exchange
- Stock exchange
- Regulation D (SEC)

Related legislation

- 1933 - Securities Act of 1933
- 1934 – Securities Exchange Act of 1934
- 1938 – Temporary National Economic Committee (establishment)
- 1939 - Trust Indenture Act of 1939
- 1940 - Investment Advisers Act of 1940
- 1940 - Investment Company Act of 1940
- 1968 – Williams Act (Securities Disclosure Act)
- 1975 – Securities and Exchange Act
- 1982 – Garn–St. Germain Depository Institutions Act
- 1999 – Gramm-Leach-Bliley Act
- 2000 – Commodity Futures Modernization Act of 2000
- 2002 – Sarbanes–Oxley Act
- 2006 - Credit Rating Agency Reform Act of 2006
- 2010 – Dodd–Frank Wall Street Reform and Consumer Protection Act
