= Commodity Futures Modernization Act of 2000 =

United States federal legislation

- Long title: To reauthorize and amend the Commodity Exchange Act to promote legal certainty, enhance competition, and reduce systemic risk in markets for futures and over-the-counter derivatives, and for other purposes.
- Acronyms (colloquial): CFMA
- Enacted by: the 106th United States Congress
- Effective: December 21, 2000

Legislative history
- Introduced in the House as H.R. 5660 by Tom Ewing (R–IL) on December 14, 2000; Signed into law by President Bill Clinton on December 21, 2000

The Commodity Futures Modernization Act of 2000 (CFMA) is a United States federal law that ensures that over-the-counter (OTC) derivatives remained unregulated.

The Commodity Futures Trading Commission (CFTC) had desired to have "functional regulation" of the market, but the CFMA rejected this approach. Instead, the CFTC continued to do "entity-based supervision of OTC derivatives dealers". The CFMA's handling of OTC derivatives, such as credit default swaps, has become controversial, as these derivatives played a major role in the 2008 financial crisis and the Great Recession. The Commodity Futures Modernization Act (CFMA) of 2000 is a landmark piece of legislation in the United States that significantly altered the regulation of financial markets. Signed into law on December 21, 2000, the CFMA had several major impacts on the trading of derivatives, futures, and other financial instruments. Key Provisions: Deregulation of Over-the-Counter (OTC) Derivatives: One of the most significant features of the CFMA was that it removed the regulatory oversight of over-the-counter (OTC) derivatives, such as credit default swaps (CDS). Prior to this, derivatives had been subject to varying degrees of regulation. The CFMA clarified that these contracts were exempt from oversight by the Commodity Futures Trading Commission (CFTC) and the Securities and Exchange Commission (SEC).

== Introduction ==
Before and after the CFMA, federal banking regulators imposed capital and other requirements on banks that entered into OTC derivatives. The U.S. Securities and Exchange Commission (SEC) and CFTC had limited "risk assessment" authority over OTC derivatives dealers affiliated with securities or commodities brokers and also jointly administered a voluntary program under which the largest securities and commodities firms reported additional information about derivative activities, management controls, risk and capital management, and counterparty exposure policies that were similar to, but more limited than, the requirements for banks. Banks and securities firms were the dominant dealers in the market, with commercial bank dealers holding by far the largest share. To the extent insurance company affiliates acted as dealers of OTC derivatives rather than as counterparties to transactions with banks or security firm affiliates, they had no such federal "safety and soundness" regulation of those activities and typically conducted the activities through London-based affiliates.

The CFMA continued an existing 1992 preemption of state laws enacted in the Futures Trading Practices Act of 1992 which prevented the law from treating eligible OTC derivatives transactions as gambling or otherwise illegal. It also extended that preemption to security-based derivatives that had previously been excluded from the CEA and its preemption of state law. The CFMA, as enacted by President Clinton, went beyond the recommendations of a Presidential Working Group on Financial Markets (PWG) report titled "Over-the Counter Derivatives and the Commodity Exchange Act" (the "PWG Report"). President's Working Group on Financial Markets, November 1999:

- Lawrence Summers, Treasury Department
- Alan Greenspan, Federal Reserve
- Arthur Levitt, SEC
- William J Rainer, CFTC

Although hailed by the PWG on the day of congressional passage as "important legislation" to allow "the United States to maintain its competitive position in the over-the-counter derivative markets", by 2001 the collapse of Enron brought public attention to the CFMA's treatment of energy derivatives in the "Enron Loophole". Following the Federal Reserve's emergency loans to "rescue" American International Group (AIG) in September 2008, the CFMA has received even more widespread criticism for its treatment of credit default swaps and other OTC derivatives. (Note: For the quoted language see PWG December 15, 2000, letters to Senator Thomas Harkin, Ranking Member of Senate Agriculture Committee and to Senator Paul Sarbanes, Ranking Member of Senate Banking Committee. These letters were issued jointly by the four members of the PWG on December 15, 2000, for use in the Senate consideration that day of H.R. 5660 as part of H.R. 4577. While no such letters were introduced in the House during its debate of H.R. 4577, as described in note 69 below, Representative Charles Stenholm (D-TX) stated H.R. 5660 was "broadly supported" by the Administration and the PWG and Representative Sheila Jackson Lee (D-TX) confirmed that H.R. 5660 was "acceptable" to the United States Treasury Department, CFTC, and SEC. Despite this, as described in note 70 below, the narrative has been widely circulated that a single Senator, Senator Phil Gramm (R-TX), somehow "slipped in" or "sneaked in" to H.R. 4577 the CFMA.)

In 2008 the "Close the Enron Loophole Act" was enacted into law to regulate more extensively "energy trading facilities." (Note: See section below.) On August 11, 2009, the Treasury Department sent Congress draft legislation to implement its proposal to amend the CFMA and other laws to provide "comprehensive regulation of all over-the counter derivatives." This proposal was revised in the House and, in that revised form, passed by the House on December 11, 2009, as part of H.R. 4173 (Dodd–Frank Wall Street Reform and Consumer Protection Act). Separate, but similar, proposed legislation was introduced in the Senate and is still awaiting Senate action at the time of the House action. (Note: See section below.)

== Background ==
=== OTC derivatives regulation before the CFMA ===
==== Exchange trading requirement ====
The PWG Report was directed at ending controversy over how swaps and other OTC derivatives related to the CEA. A derivative is a financial contract or instrument that "derives" its value from the price or other characteristic of an underlying "thing" (or "commodity"). A farmer might enter into a "derivative contract" under which the farmer would sell from next summer's harvest a specified number of bushels of wheat at a specified price per bushel. If this contract were executed on a commodity exchange, it would be a "futures contract". (Note: For the background to and purpose of the PWG Report, see "Over-the-Counter Derivatives Markets and the Commodity Exchange Act", Report of The President's Working Group on Financial Markets, November 1999 (PWG Report) at 10 to 18, and Mark Jickling, "The Commodity Futures Modernization Act of 2000: Derivatives Regulation Reconsidered", RL30434, updated January 29, 2003, Congressional Research Service Report for Congress (CRS Derivatives Regulation Report) at CRS-7 to 8. For definitions of derivatives, see the PWG Report at 4 to 5 and the CRS Derivatives Regulation Report at CRS-2. As described further below in this Section 1.1.1, a farmer would have the possibility to enter into such a pricing contract with a grain elevator or other buyer, in which case the contract might be a "forward delivery" and not a "future delivery" contract. A "futures contract", however, is not defined by whether it is executed on a commodity exchange. The CFTC has long brought actions against illegal "futures contracts" executed off a regulated exchange. Philip McBride Johnson and Thomas Lee Hazen, Derivatives Regulation (successor edition to Commodities Regulation, Third Edition) (Aspen Publishers 2004, supplemented through 2009 Cumulative Supplement) ("Johnson/Hazen Derivatives Regulation Treatise") at 50 to 53. Testimony of Brooksley Born, Chairwoman Commodity Futures Trading Commission, Concerning the Over-the Counter Derivatives Market, before the U.S. Senate Committee on Agriculture, Nutrition and Forestry, July 30, 1998 ("Born July 1998 Senate Agriculture Testimony") at 10, in the text leading to footnote 35 for that testimony ("It is the nature of the instruments, and not where they are traded, that determines jurisdiction under the CEA.")) Before 1974, the CEA only applied to agricultural commodities. "Future delivery" contracts in agricultural commodities listed in the CEA were required to be traded on regulated exchanges such as the Chicago Board of Trade.

The Commodity Futures Trading Commission Act of 1974 created the CFTC as the new regulator of commodity exchanges. It also expanded the scope of the CEA to cover the previously listed agricultural products and "all other goods and articles, except onions, and all services, rights, and interests in which contracts for future delivery are presently or in the future dealt in." Existing non-exchange traded financial "commodity" derivatives markets (mostly "interbank" markets) in foreign currencies, government securities, and other specified instruments were excluded from the CEA through the "Treasury Amendment", to the extent transactions in such markets remained off a "board of trade." The expanded CEA, however, did not generally exclude financial derivatives.

After the 1974 law change, the CEA continued to require that all "future delivery" contracts in commodities covered by the law be executed on a regulated exchange. This meant any "future delivery" contract entered into by parties off a regulated exchange would be illegal and unenforceable. The term "future delivery" was not defined in the CEA. Its meaning evolved through CFTC actions and court rulings.

Not all derivative contracts are "future delivery" contracts. The CEA always excluded "forward delivery" contracts under which, for example, a farmer might set today the price at which the farmer would deliver to a grain elevator or other buyer a certain number of bushels of wheat to be harvested next summer. By the early 1980s a market in interest rate and currency "swaps" had emerged in which banks and their customers would typically agree to exchange interest or currency amounts based on one party paying a fixed interest rate amount (or an amount in a specified currency) and the other paying a floating interest rate amount (or an amount in a different currency). These transactions were similar to "forward delivery" contracts under which "commercial users" of a commodity contracted for future deliveries of that commodity at an agreed upon price.

Based on the similarities between swaps and "forward delivery" contracts, the swap market grew rapidly in the United States during the 1980s. Nevertheless, as a 2006 Congressional Research Service report explained in describing the status of OTC derivatives in the 1980s: "if a court had ruled that a swap was in fact an illegal, off-exchange futures contract, trillions of dollars in outstanding swaps could have been invalidated. This might have caused chaos in financial markets, as swaps users would suddenly be exposed to the risks they had used derivatives to avoid."

==== "Legal certainty" through regulatory exemptions ====
To eliminate this risk, the CFTC and the Congress acted to give "legal certainty" to swaps and, more generally, to the OTC derivatives market activities of "sophisticated parties."

First, the CFTC issued "policy statements" and "statutory interpretations" that swaps, "hybrid instruments" (i.e., securities or deposits with a derivative component), and certain "forward transactions" were not covered by the CEA. The CFTC issued the forward transactions "statutory interpretation" in response to a court ruling that a "Brent" (i.e., North Sea) oil "forward delivery" contract was, in fact, a "future delivery" contract, which could cause it to be illegal and unenforceable under the CEA. This, along with a court ruling in the United Kingdom that swaps entered into by a local UK government unit were illegal, elevated concerns with "legal certainty."

Second, in response to this concern about "legal certainty", Congress (through the Futures Trading Practices Act of 1992 (FTPA)) gave the CFTC authority to exempt transactions from the exchange trading requirement and other provisions of the CEA. The CFTC used that authority (as Congress contemplated or "instructed") to exempt the same three categories of transactions for which it had previously issued policy statements or statutory interpretations. The FTPA also provided that such CFTC exemptions preempted any state law that would otherwise make such transactions illegal as gambling or otherwise. To preserve the 1982 Shad-Johnson Accord, which prohibited futures on "non-exempt securities", the FTPA prohibited the CFTC from granting an exemption from that prohibition. This would later lead to concerns about the "legal certainty" of swaps and other OTC derivatives related to "securities."

Similar to the existing statutory exclusion for "forward delivery" contracts, the 1989 "policy statement" on swaps had required that swaps covered by the "policy statement" be privately negotiated transactions between sophisticated parties covering (or "hedging") risks arising from their business (including investment and financing) activities. The new "swaps exemption" dropped the "hedging" requirement. It continued to require the swap be entered into by "sophisticated parties" (i.e., "eligible swap participants") in private transactions.

Although OTC derivatives were subject to criticism in the 1990s and bills were introduced in Congress to regulate aspects of the market, the 1993 exemptions remained in place. Bank regulators issued guidelines and requirements for bank OTC derivatives activities that responded to many of the concerns raised by Congress, the General Accounting Office (GAO), and others. Securities firms agreed with the Securities and Exchange Commission (SEC) and CFTC to establish a Derivatives Policy Group through which six large securities firms conducting the great majority of securities firm OTC derivatives activities reported to the CFTC and SEC about their activities and adopted voluntary principles similar to those applicable to banks. Insurance companies, which represented a much smaller part of the market, remained outside any federal oversight of their OTC derivatives activities.

=== CFTC/SEC dispute ===
==== Dispute ====
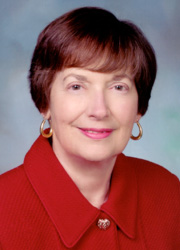
Brooksley Born, CFTC Chair in 1996 – June 1999

In 1997 and 1998 a conflict developed between the CFTC and the SEC over an SEC proposal to ease its broker-dealer regulations for securities firm affiliates that engaged in OTC derivatives activities. The SEC proposed relaxed net capital and other rules (known as "Broker-Dealer Lite") for OTC derivatives dealers. The CFTC objected that some activities that would be authorized by this proposal were not permitted under the CEA. The CFTC also issued a "concept release" requesting comments on whether the OTC derivatives market was properly regulated under the existing CEA exemptions and on whether market developments required regulatory changes.

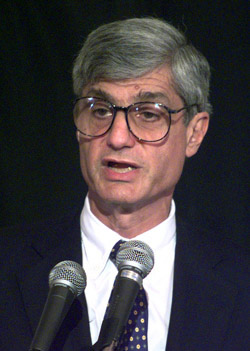
Robert Rubin, Treasury Secretary in January 1995 – July 1999

The CFTC's actions were widely viewed as a response to the SEC's Broker-Dealer Lite proposal and, at least by Professor John C. Coffee, as perhaps an attempt to force the SEC to withdraw the proposal. The CFTC expressed dismay over the Broker-Dealer Lite proposal and the manner in which it was issued, but also noted it was 18 months into a "comprehensive regulatory reform effort." The same day the CFTC issued its "concept release" Treasury Secretary Robert Rubin, Federal Reserve Board Chair Alan Greenspan, and SEC Chair Arthur Levitt (who, along with CFTC Chair Brooksley Born, were the members of the PWG) issued a letter asking Congress to prevent the CFTC from changing its existing treatment of OTC derivatives. They argued that, by calling into question whether swaps and other OTC derivatives were "futures", the CFTC was calling into question the legality of security related OTC derivatives for which the CFTC could not grant exemptions (as described in Section 1.1.2 above) and, more broadly, undermining an "implicit agreement" not to raise the question of the CEA's coverage of swaps and other established OTC derivatives.

In the ensuing Congressional hearings, the three members of the PWG dissenting from the CFTC's "unilateral" actions argued the CFTC was not the proper body, and the CEA was not the proper statute, to regulate OTC derivatives activities. Banks and securities firms dominated the OTC derivatives market. Their regulators needed to be involved in any regulation of the market. Bank regulators and the SEC already monitored and regulated bank and broker-dealer OTC Derivatives activities. The dissenting PWG members explained that any effort to regulate those activities through the CEA would only lead to the activities moving outside the United States. In the 1980s banks had used offshore branches to book transactions potentially covered by the CEA. Securities firms were still using London and other foreign offices to book at least securities related derivatives transactions. Any change in regulation of OTC derivatives should only occur after a full study of the issue by the entire PWG.

CFTC Chair Mrs.Brooksley Born replied that the CFTC had exclusive authority over "futures" under the CEA and could not allow the other PWG members to dictate the CFTC's authority under that statute. She pointed out the "concept release" did not propose, nor presuppose the need for, any change in the regulatory treatment of OTC derivatives. She noted, however, that changes in the OTC derivatives market had made that market more similar to futures markets.

Congress passed a law preventing the CFTC from changing its treatment of OTC derivatives through March 1999. CFTC Chair Born lost control of the issue at the CFTC when three of her four fellow Commissioners announced they supported the legislation and would temporarily not vote to take any action concerning OTC derivatives. CFTC Chair Born resigned effective June 1999. Her successor, William Rainer, was CFTC Chair when the PWG Report was issued in November 1999.

==== Other background events ====
While the dispute between the SEC and CFTC over OTC derivatives jurisdiction was at the core of pre-2008 narrations of the events leading to the CFMA, two other noteworthy background events occurred. First, in early 1997 CFTC Chairperson Born testified forcefully to Congress against a Senate bill that would have authorized futures exchanges to establish "professional markets" exempt from many regulatory requirements in a manner similar to the "regulatory relief" ultimately provided for an "exempt board of trade" under the CFMA. In her testimony to the Senate Agriculture Committee and in several subsequent speeches during the first half of 1997, Chairperson Born argued OTC derivatives did not create the same "concentration of financial risk" as exchange-traded futures and did not perform the "unique price discovery" function of exchange traded contracts. She argued these differences justified different regulatory treatment.

Chairperson Born's 1997 testimony on the difference between exchange and OTC markets was consistent with her first speech as CFTC Chair on October 24, 1996, in which she stated her belief that regulation of the OTC derivatives market should be limited to fraud and manipulation. While her 1997 testimony opposed the Senate bill's provision to codify in law the existing CFTC regulatory exemptions for OTC derivatives, she also stated the CFTC was "watching" the OTC derivatives market with the PWG and had no plans to modify the existing CFTC exemptions for that market.

The futures exchanges argued they needed permission to operate "professional markets" free of "regulatory burdens" in order to compete with foreign exchanges and the OTC derivatives market that catered to the same professionals. 1997 news reports attributed the failure of the "professional markets" legislation to disagreements concerning equity derivatives between the Chicago Board of Trade and the OTC derivatives dealers, on the one side, and the Chicago Mercantile Exchange and other futures exchanges, on the other.

Second, after the 1998 CFTC "concept release" controversy arose, Long-Term Capital Management (LTCM) became headline news with the near collapse of a hedge fund it managed. The near collapse was widely attributed to OTC derivatives transactions. At an October 1, 1998, hearing before the House Banking Committee, Chairperson Born received compliments from some members of the Committee for having raised important issues in the May "concept release." The hearing, however, focused on issues with regulatory oversight of the banks and security firms that had given the LTCM fund high leverage through both loans and OTC derivative transactions.

The 1999 GAO Report that analyzed the LTCM experience criticized federal regulators for not coordinating their oversight of LTCM's activities with banks and securities firms. The Report also recommended "consideration of" legislation to grant the SEC and CFTC consolidated supervision authority for securities and commodities firms in order to supervise the OTC derivatives activities of those consolidated entities in a manner similar to the Federal Reserve's authority over bank holding companies. The GAO Report did not consider, and did not recommend, CFTC regulation of OTC derivatives.

An effect of the LTCM experience was that the conference committee report adopting the six-month moratorium on CFTC action affecting OTC derivative regulation included a statement that "the conferees strongly urge" the PWG to study OTC derivatives transactions of hedge funds and others. Although Chairperson Born had explained at the October 1, 1998, House Banking Committee hearing that the CFTC's supervisory authority over the LTCM fund as a "commodity pool operator" was limited to monitoring its exchange trading activities, the CFTC's possession of financial statements for the fund received negative news coverage in November 1998 based on the fact the CFTC was the only federal regulator to receive such reports directly from LTCM and had not shared the information with other members of the PWG. When the LTCM matter was investigated at a December 16, 1998, Senate Agriculture Committee hearing, the three CFTC Commissioners that had supported the Congressional moratorium, as described in Section 1.2.1 above, reiterated their support and their position that the entire PWG should study the OTC derivatives market and the issues raised in the CFTC's "concept release."

== CFMA as implementation and expansion of the PWG Report ==
=== The President's Working Group Report ===
The PWG Report recommended: (1) the codification into the CEA, as an "exclusion", of existing regulatory exemptions for OTC financial derivatives, revised to permit electronic trading between "eligible swaps participants" (acting as "principals") and to even allow standardized (i.e. "fungible") contracts subject to "regulated" clearing; (2) continuation of the existing CFTC authority to exempt other non-agricultural commodities (such as energy products) from provisions of the CEA; (3) continuation of existing exemptions for "hybrid instruments" expanded to cover the Shad-Johnson Accord (thereby exempting from the CEA any hybrid that could be viewed as a future on a "non-exempt security"), and a prohibition on the CFTC changing the exemption without the agreement of the other members of the PWG; (4) continuation of the preemption of state laws that might otherwise make any "excluded" or "exempted" transactions illegal as gambling or otherwise; (5) as previously recommended by the PWG in its report on hedge funds, the expansion of SEC and CFTC "risk assessment" oversight of affiliates of securities firms and commodity firms engaged in OTC derivatives activities to ensure they did not endanger affiliated broker-dealers or futures commission merchants; (6) encouraging the CFTC to grant broad "deregulation" of existing exchange trading to reflect differences in (A) the susceptibility of commodities to price manipulation and (B) the "sophistication" and financial strength of the parties permitted to trade on the exchange; and (7) permission for single stock and narrow index stock futures on terms to be agreed between the CFTC and SEC.

In 1998 the CFTC had disagreed with the other members of the PWG about the scope and purposes of the CEA. Whereas the CFTC saw broad purposes in protecting "fair access" to markets, "financial integrity", "price discovery and transparency", "fitness standards," and protection of "market participants from fraud and other abuses," other members of the PWG (particularly the Federal Reserve through Alan Greenspan) found the more limited purposes of (1) preventing price manipulation and (2) protecting retail investors.

The PWG Report ended that disagreement by analyzing only four issues in deciding not to apply the CEA to OTC derivatives. By finding (1) the sophisticated parties participating in the OTC derivatives markets did not require CEA protections, (2) the activities of most OTC derivatives dealers were already subject to direct or indirect federal oversight, (3) manipulation of financial markets through financial OTC derivatives had not occurred and was highly unlikely, and (4) the OTC derivatives market performed no significant "price discovery" function, the PWG concluded "there is no compelling evidence of problems involving bilateral swap agreements that would warrant regulation under the CEA." By essentially adopting the views of the other members of the PWG concerning the scope and application of the CEA, the CFTC permitted a "remarkable" agreement "on a redrawing of the regulatory lines."

The PWG Report encouraged the growth in similarities between the OTC derivatives market and the regulated exchange-traded futures market. Price information could be broadly disseminated through "electronic trading facilities." The PWG Report also emphasized the desire to "maintain U.S. leadership in these rapidly developing markets" by discouraging the movement of such transactions "offshore". In the 1998 Congressional hearings concerning the CFTC "concept release" Representative James A. Leach (R-IA) had tied the controversy to "systemic risk" by arguing the movement of transactions to jurisdictions outside the United States would replace U.S. regulation with laxer foreign supervision. It can be argued that the PWG Report recommendations and the CFMA as enacted did not change the "regulation" of OTC derivatives because there was no existing regulation under the CEA or securities laws. The change to the CEA, however, would be the elimination of existing criteria for distinguishing OTC derivatives from "futures".

=== CFMA implementation ===
Title I of the CFMA adopted recommendations of the PWG Report by broadly excluding from the CEA transactions in financial derivatives (i.e. "excluded commodities") between "eligible contract participants." The definition of "eligible contract participant" covered the same types of "sophisticated" parties as the existing "swaps exemption" in its definition of "eligible swap participants", but was broader, particularly by adding permission for individuals with assets of $5 million rather than $10 million, if the transaction related to managing asset or liability "risk". The PWG had recommended "considering" an increase in this threshold to $25 million, not a reduction for actual hedging.

Such "eligible contract participants" could enter into transactions on or off "electronic trading facilities" without being subject to any of the regulatory oversight applicable to futures. The only exception was that the transactions would be subject to the rules for the new "Derivative Clearing Organizations" authorized by the CFMA, if the transaction used such a clearing facility. The CFMA did not require that standardized transaction use a clearing facility. It only authorized their existence, subject to regulatory oversight. The PWG Report had recommended permitting "standardized" contracts, so long as they were subject to regulated clearing. Title I's extended most of the same exclusions to non-financial commodities that were not agricultural. These "exempt commodities" were, in practice, mostly energy and metal commodities. As discussed in Section 4, these transactions were subject to the "anti-fraud" and "anti-manipulation" provisions of the CEA in some, but not all, circumstances. The PWG Report had recommended that exemptions for such transactions remain in the control of the CFTC, although it had recommended the continuation of those regulatory exemptions.

Title I also resolved the issue of "hybrid instruments" by defining when such an instrument would be considered a "security" subject to security laws and excluded from the CEA even though it had a "commodity component". Equivalent treatment of bank products was provided in Title IV. Title I retained the CEA's existing preemption of state gambling and other laws that could render a CFTC exempted transaction illegal. It made that preemption applicable to all exempted or excluded transactions. Title I also created a new system under which three different types of exchanges could be established based on the types of commodities and participants on such exchanges.

Title II of the CFMA repealed the 1982 Shad-Johnson Accord that had prohibited single stock and narrow stock index futures and replaced that with a joint CFTC and SEC regulated "security futures" system.

Title III established a framework for SEC regulation of "security-based swaps". The PWG Report had not addressed this issue.

Title IV established a framework for CFTC regulation of "bank products". This included coverage of deposit based "hybrid instruments", but went further. The PWG Report had not dealt with these issues beyond how Title IV overlapped with Title I.

The CFMA did not provide the CFTC or SEC the broader "risk assessment" authority over affiliates of futures commission merchants or broker-dealers that the PWG Report had recommended.

== Legislative history ==
=== H.R. 4541 and S. 2697 ===
H.R. 4541 was introduced in the House of Representatives on May 25, 2000, as the Commodities Futures Modernization Act of 2000. Three separate House Committees held hearings on the bill. Each Committee reported out a different amended version of H.R. 4541 by September 6, 2000.

Another Commodity Futures Modernization Act of 2000 was introduced in the Senate on June 8, 2000, as S. 2697. A joint hearing of the Senate Agriculture and Banking Committees was held to consider that bill. The Senate Agriculture Committee reported out an amended version of S. 2697 on August 25, 2000.

During the House and Senate committee hearings on these bills, Committee Chairs and Ranking Members described a tight legislative schedule for the bills because of the election year's short Congressional schedule. Sponsors had delayed introduction of the bills as they vainly awaited agreement between the CFTC and SEC on how to regulate the single stock futures contemplated by the PWG Report. That issue dominated the hearings.

On September 14, 2000, the SEC and CFTC announced they had agreed on a joint regulation approach for "security futures." Senior Treasury Department officials hailed the "historic agreement" as eliminating "the major obstacles to forming a consensus bill." At the same time, Senator Phil Gramm (R-TX), the Chair of the Senate Banking Committee, was quoted as insisting that any bill brought to the Senate Floor would need to be expanded to include prohibitions on SEC regulation of the swaps market.

Democratic members of Congress later described a period in late September through early October during which they were excluded from negotiations over reconciling the three committee versions of H.R. 4541, followed by involvement in reaching an acceptable compromise that left some Republicans unhappy with the final version of the bill and some Democrats upset over the "process", particularly the involvement of Sen. Gramm and House Republican leadership in the negotiations. Despite indications no agreement would be reached, on October 19, 2000, the White House announced its "strong support" for the version of H.R. 4541 scheduled to reach the House Floor that day. The House approved H.R. 4541 in a 377–4 vote.

As so passed by the House, H.R. 4541 contained, in Title I, the language concerning OTC derivatives that became the source for Title I of the CFMA and, in Title II, the language regulating "security futures" that became the source for Title II of the CFMA. Titles III and IV would be added when the CFMA was enacted into law two months later.

=== From H.R. 4541 to the CFMA ===
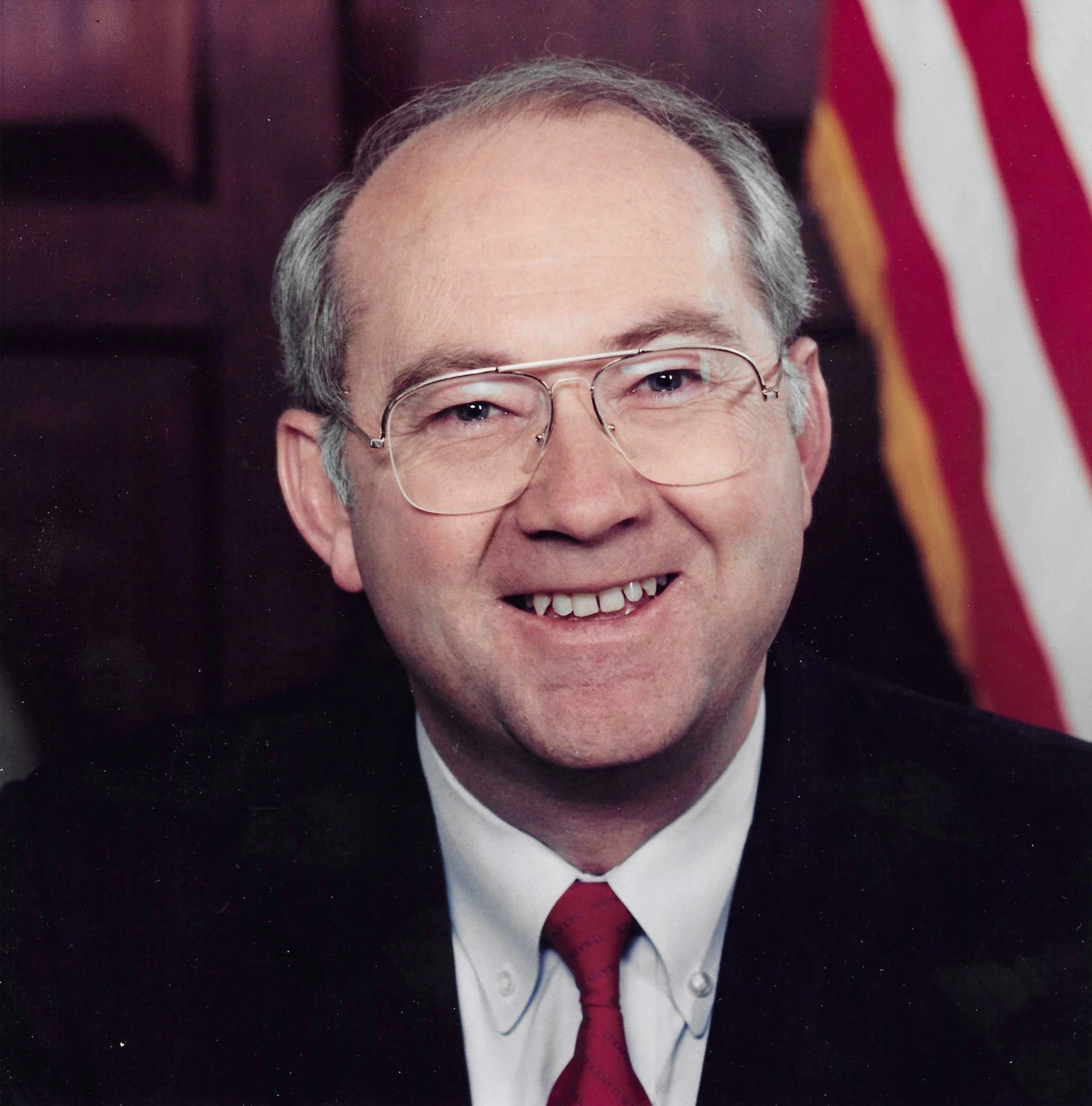
Senator Phil Gramm

After the House passed H.R. 4541, press reports indicated Sen. Gramm was blocking Senate action based on his continued insistence that the bill be expanded to prevent the SEC from regulating swaps, and the desire to broaden the protections against CFTC regulation for "bank products". Nevertheless, with Congress adjourned for the 2000 elections, but scheduled to return for a "lame duck" session, Treasury Secretary Summers "urged" Congress to move forward with legislation on OTC derivatives based on the "extraordinary bipartisan consensus this year on these very complex issues.".

When Congress returned into session for two days in mid-November, the sponsor of H.R. 4541, Representative Thomas Ewing (R-IL), described Senator Gramm as the "one man" blocking Senate passage of H.R. 4541. Senator Richard G. Lugar (R-IN), the sponsor of S. 2697, was reported to be considering forcing H.R. 4541 to the Senate Floor against Senator Gramm's objections.

After Congress returned into session on December 4, 2000, there were reports Senator Gramm and the Treasury Department were exchanging proposed language to deal with the issues raised by Sen. Gramm, followed by a report those negotiations had reached an impasse. On December 14, however, the Treasury Department announced agreement had been reached the night before and urged Congress to enact into law the agreed upon language.

The "compromise language" was introduced in the House on December 14, 2000, as H.R. 5660. The same language was introduced in the Senate on December 15, 2000 as S. 3283. The Senate and House conference that was called to reconcile differences in H.R. 4577 appropriations adopted the "compromise language" by incorporating H.R. 5660 (the "CFMA") into H.R. 4577, which was titled "Consolidated Appropriations Act for FY 2001". The House passed the Conference Report and, therefore, H.R. 4577 in a vote of 292–60. Over "objection" by Senators James Inhofe (R-OK) and Paul Wellstone (D-MN), the Senate passed the Conference Report, and therefore H.R. 4577, by "unanimous consent". The Chairs and Ranking members of each of the five Congressional Committees that considered H.R. 4541 or S. 2697 supported, or entered into the Congressional Record statements in support of, the CFMA. The PWG issued letters expressing the unanimous support of each of its four members for the CFMA. H.R. 4577, including H.R. 5660, was signed into law, as CFMA, on December 21, 2000.

== Controversies ==
=== Credit default swaps ===
With the 2008 emergence of widespread concerns about credit default swaps, the CFMA's treatment of those instruments has become controversial. Title I of the CFMA broadly excludes from the CEA financial derivatives, including specifically any index or measure tied to a "credit risk or measure". In 2000, Title I's exclusion of financial derivatives from the CEA was not controversial in Congress. Instead, it was widely hailed for bringing "legal certainty" to this "important market" permitting "the United States to retain its leadership in the financial markets", as recommended by the PWG Report.

==== Insurance law issue ====
The CFMA's treatment of credit default swaps has received the most attention for two issues. First, former New York Insurance Superintendent Eric Dinallo has argued credit default swaps should have been regulated as insurance and that the CFMA removed a valuable legal tool by preempting state "bucket shop" and gaming laws that could have been used to attack credit default swaps as illegal. In 1992, the FTPA had preempted those state laws for financial derivatives covered by the CFTC's "swaps exemption." As described in Section 1.1.2 above, however, a "gap" in the CFTC's powers prohibited it from exempting futures on "non-exempt securities". This "loophole" (which was intended to preserve the Shad-Johnson Accord's prohibition on single stock futures) meant that, before the CFMA, the CEA's preemption of state gaming and "bucket shop" laws would not have protected a credit default swap on a "non-exempt security" (i.e. an equity security or a "non-exempt" debt obligation that qualified as a "security"). As before 1992, the application of such state laws to a credit default swap (or any other swap) would depend upon a court finding the swap was a gambling, "bucket shop", or otherwise illegal transaction. As described in Section 1.2.1 above, legal uncertainty for security-based swaps was an important issue in the events that led to the PWG Report. The PWG Report recommended eliminating that uncertainty by excluding credit default swaps and all security-based swaps from the CEA and by adding to the "hybrid instrument" exemption an exclusion from the Shad-Johnson Accord.

Former Superintendent Dinallo has written that the CFMA was enacted in part to avoid having OTC derivatives transactions move offshore. He has not, however, addressed whether that could have been avoided if the CFMA had not been enacted. AIG (the insurance company addressed by Mr. Dinallo's commentary) located its controversial derivatives dealer (AIG Financial Products) in London and conducted its "regulatory CDS" transactions through a French bank (Banque AIG) because of the bank regulatory capital provision that banks (not AAA rated parties) received a reduced credit risk "weighting" for their obligations, including CDS, owed to other banks. General Re, the other insurance company with a very active derivatives dealer affiliate, similarly established that dealer in London.

==== Securities law issue ====
Second, Title II of the CFMA treated credit default swaps tied to "securities" as "security-related swaps" for which the SEC was granted limited authority to enforce "insider trading", fraud, and anti-manipulation provisions of the securities laws. Before the CFMA, it was generally agreed most swaps were not securities, but the SEC had always maintained that swaps tied to securities were securities, particularly when such swaps could reproduce the attributes of owning the underlying security. In granting the SEC authority over "security-related swaps", the CFMA specifically prohibited applying any "prophylactic" anti-fraud or anti-manipulation measures. The SEC has complained this has prevented it from collecting information, and requiring disclosures, regarding credit default positions of investors. The SEC has argued this handicaps its ability to monitor possible manipulations of security markets through credit default swaps.

==== Centralized clearing ====
The SEC, the PWG, and others have also expressed concern about the "systemic risk" created by a lack of centralized clearing of credit default swaps. Although (as noted in Section 2 above) the CFMA created the possibility of centralized clearing by removing the pre-CFMA requirements that OTC derivatives not be subject to centralized clearing, the CFMA did not require such clearing, even for "standardized" transactions.

=== "Enron Loophole" ===
==== Section 2(h) "loophole" ====
The first provision of the CFMA to receive widespread popular attention was the "Enron Loophole". In most accounts, this "loophole" was the CEA's new section 2(h). Section 2(h) created two exemptions from the CEA for "exempt commodities" such as oil and other "energy" products.

First, any transaction in exempt commodities not executed on a "trading facility" between "eligible contract participants" (acting as principals) was exempted from most CEA provisions (other than fraud and anti-manipulation provisions). This exemption in Section 2(h)(1) of the CEA covered the "bilateral swaps market" for exempt "trading facilities."

Second, any transaction in exempt commodities executed on an "electronic trading facility" between "eligible commercial entities" (acting as principals) was also exempted from most CEA provisions (other than those dealing with fraud and manipulation). The "trading facility", however, was required to file with the CFTC certain information and certifications and to provide trading and other information to the CFTC upon any "special call." This exemption in Section 2(h)(2) of the CEA covered the "commercial entities" for exempt "electronic trading facilities."

While the language of Section 2(h) was in H.R. 4541 as passed by the House, the portion of Section 2(h) dealing with the exempt commercial market had been deleted from S. 2697 when the Senate Agriculture Committee reported out an amended version of that bill. H.R. 4541 served as the basis for Titles I and II of the CFMA. The Senate Agriculture Committee's removal of the Section 2(h) language from S. 2697, however, served as the basis for later Senate concern over the origins of Section 2(h).

In 2008 Congress enacted into law over President Bush's veto an Omnibus Farm Bill that contained the "Close the Enron Loophole Act." This added to CEA Section 2(h)(2) a new definition of "electronic trading facility" and imposed on such facilities requirements applicable to fully regulated exchanges (i.e. "designated contract markets") such as the NYMEX. The legislation did not change Section 2(h)(1) exemption for the "bilateral swaps market" in exempt commodities.

==== Section 2(g) "loophole" ====
Section 2(g) of the CEA is also sometimes called the "Enron Loophole". It is a broader exclusion from the CEA than the Section 2(h)(1) exemption for the "bilateral swaps market" in exempt commodities. It excludes from even the fraud and manipulation provisions of the CEA any "individually negotiated" transaction in a non-agricultural commodity between "eligible contract participants" not executed on a "trading facility". Thus, the exclusion from provisions of the CEA for "eligible contract participants" is broader than the Section 2(h)(1) exemption for "bilateral swaps" of energy commodities. The criteria for this exclusion, however, are narrower in requiring "individual negotiation".

This exclusion was not contained in either H.R. 4541 or S. 2697 as introduced in Congress. The House Banking and Financial Services Committee added this provision to the amended H.R. 4541 it reported to the House. That language was included in H.R. 4541 as passed by the House. Its final version was modified to conform to the Gramm-Leach-Bliley Act definition of "swap agreement". That definition requires that the swap be "individually negotiated". H.R. 4541 had required that each "material economic term" be individually negotiated.

2002 Senate hearings indicated CEA Section 2(h)(2) was not the "Enron Loophole" used by EnronOnline. That facility was not required to qualify as an "electronic trading facility" under Section 2(h)(2) of the CEA because Enron Online was only used to enter into transactions with Enron affiliates. There were not "multiple participants" on both the buy and sell sides of the trades. Whether such Enron-only trades were covered by the Section 2(h)(1) "bilateral swaps market" exemption for energy products or the broader Section 2(g) exclusion for swaps generally depended whether there was "individual negotiation".

=== Bill Clinton ===
In June 2013, film producer Charles Ferguson interviewed Bill Clinton who said he and Larry Summers couldn't change Alan Greenspan's mind and Congress then passed the Act with a veto-proof supermajority. Ferguson revealed that this was inaccurate and, he said, a lie, while commenting that he thought Clinton was "a really good actor". In fact, Ferguson wrote, the Clinton Administration and Larry Summers lobbied for the Act and joined Robert Rubin in both privately and publicly attacking advocates of regulation.

== Dodd–Frank Wall Street Reform and Consumer Protection Act ==
On August 11, 2009, the Treasury Department sent to Congress proposed legislation titled the "Over-the-Counter Derivatives Markets Act of 2009." The Treasury Department stated that under this proposed legislation "the OTC derivative markets will be comprehensively regulated for the first time."

To accomplish this "comprehensive regulation", the proposed legislation would repeal many of the provisions of the CFMA, including all of the exclusions and exemptions that have been identified as the "Enron Loophole". While the proposed legislation would generally retain the "legal certainty" provisions of the CFMA, it would establish new requirements for parties dealing in non-"standardized" OTC derivatives and would require that "standardized" OTC derivatives be traded through a regulated trading facility and cleared through regulated central clearing. The proposed legislation would also repeal the CFMA's limits on SEC authority over "security-based swaps."

On December 11, 2009, the House passed H.R. 4173, the so-called Wall Street Reform and Consumer Protection Act of 2009, which included a revised version of the Treasury Department's proposed legislation that would repeal the same provisions of the CFMA noted above.

In late April, 2010, debate began on the floor of the Senate over their version of the reform legislation and on July 21, 2010, H.R.4173 passed in the Senate and was signed into law as the Dodd–Frank Wall Street Reform and Consumer Protection Act.

== See also ==
- Securities regulation in the United States
- Regulation D (SEC)

=== Related legislation ===
- 1933 – Securities Act of 1933
- 1934 – Securities Exchange Act of 1934
- 1938 – Temporary National Economic Committee (establishment)
- 1939 – Trust Indenture Act of 1939
- 1940 – Investment Advisers Act of 1940
- 1940 – Investment Company Act of 1940
- 1968 – Williams Act (Securities Disclosure Act)
- 1975 – Securities Acts Amendments of 1975
- 1982 – Garn–St. Germain Depository Institutions Act
- 1999 – Gramm-Leach-Bliley Act
- 2002 – Sarbanes–Oxley Act
- 2003 – Fair and Accurate Credit Transactions Act of 2003
- 2006 – Credit Rating Agency Reform Act of 2006
- 2010 – Dodd–Frank Wall Street Reform and Consumer Protection Act
- 2018 - Economic Growth, Regulatory Relief, and Consumer Protection Act
