= Credit Rating Agency Reform Act =

U.S. federal law

The Credit Rating Agency Reform Act (Pub. L. 109–291 (text) (PDF)) is a United States federal law whose goal is to improve ratings quality for the protection of investors and in the public interest by fostering accountability, transparency, and competition in the credit rating agency industry.

Enacted after being signed by President Bush on September 29, 2006, it amended the Securities Exchange Act of 1934 to require nationally recognized statistical rating organizations (NRSROs) to register with the Securities and Exchange Commission (SEC).

Critics had complained that the dominance of "the big three" rating agencies – Standard & Poor's Ratings Services, Moody's Investors Service and the smaller Fitch Rating—were in part responsible for the subprime mortgage crisis of 2006–8. The agencies rated 98% of the trillions of dollars of home-mortgage oriented "structured investment" products. Hundreds of billions of dollars' worth of securities given the agencies highest—triple-A—rating were later downgraded to "junk" status, and the writedowns and losses came to over half a trillion dollars.

The Act permitted smaller, newer credit rating agencies to register as "statistical ratings organizations". The intent of the U.S. Congress was to increase the choice for consumers by opening the market to a greater number of ratings agencies, and also to incent accurate and reliable ratings.

== Effectiveness of act ==
In the 12 months that ended in June 2011, the SEC found the big three firms still issued 97% of all credit ratings, down from 98% in 2007. McClatchy Newspapers found that "little competition has emerged in rating the kinds of complex home-mortgage securities whose implosion led to the 2007 financial crisis".

Critics have complained that the criteria to designate a rating agency as "a nationally recognized statistical rating organization" was written by a "yet-to-be-identified official of one of the big three ratings agencies" and is so difficult it has "prevented at least one potential competitor from winning approval and have dissuaded others from even applying". According to critics, the law has set "odd barriers that are very favorable to the incumbents," made it "exceptionally difficult for a younger player to qualify" as a SEC recognized agency, and "absolutely slammed the door on any new competition" in structured products—"the most lucrative part of the ratings business".

== See also ==
- Securities regulation in the United States
- Commodity Futures Trading Commission
- Securities Commission
- Chicago Stock Exchange
- Financial regulation
- NASDAQ
- New York Stock Exchange
- Stock exchange
- Regulation D (SEC)

Related legislation

- 1933 – Securities Act of 1933
- 1934 – Securities Exchange Act of 1934
- 1938 – Temporary National Economic Committee (establishment)
- 1939 – Trust Indenture Act of 1939
- 1940 – Investment Advisers Act of 1940
- 1940 – Investment Company Act of 1940
- 1968 – Williams Act (Securities Disclosure Act)
- 1975 – Securities and Exchange Act
- 1982 – Garn–St. Germain Depository Institutions Act
- 1999 – Gramm–Leach–Bliley Act
- 2000 – Commodity Futures Modernization Act of 2000
- 2002 – Sarbanes–Oxley Act
- 2003 – Fair and Accurate Credit Transactions Act of 2003
- 2010 – Dodd–Frank Wall Street Reform and Consumer Protection Act
