= Dodd–Frank Act =

Regulatory act implemented by the Obama administration after the 2008 financial crisis

Dodd–Frank Wall Street Reform and Consumer Protection Act
- Long title: An Act to promote the financial stability of the United States by improving accountability and transparency in the financial system, to end "too big to fail", to protect the American taxpayer by ending bailouts, to protect consumers from abusive financial services practices, and for other purposes.
- Nicknames: Dodd–Frank Act
- Enacted by: the 111th United States Congress
- Effective: July 21, 2010; 16 years ago

Citations
- Public law: Pub. L. 111–203 (text) (PDF)
- Statutes at Large: 124 Stat. 1376–2223

Codification
- Acts amended: Commodity Exchange Act; Consumer Credit Protection Act; Federal Deposit Insurance Act; Federal Deposit Insurance Corporation Improvement Act of 1991 Federal Reserve Act; Financial Institutions Reform, Recovery, and Enforcement Act of 1989; International Banking Act of 1978; Protecting Tenants at Foreclosure Act; Revised Statutes of the United States; Securities Exchange Act of 1934; Truth in Lending Act
- Titles amended: 7 U.S.C.: Agriculture; 12 U.S.C.: Banks and Banking; 15 U.S.C.: Commerce and Trade

Legislative history
- Introduced in the House as "The Wall Street Reform and Consumer Protection Act of 2009" (H.R. 4173) by Barney Frank (D–MA) on December 2, 2009; Committee consideration by Financial Services; Passed the House on December 11, 2009 (223–202); Passed the Senate with amendment on May 20, 2010 (59–39); Reported by the joint conference committee on June 29, 2010; agreed to by the House on June 30, 2010 (237–192) and by the Senate on July 15, 2010 (60–39); Signed into law by President Barack Obama on July 21, 2010

Major amendments
- Economic Growth, Regulatory Relief and Consumer Protection Act (2018)

United States Supreme Court cases
- Lawson v. FMR LLC, 571 U.S. 429 (2014); Digital Realty Trust, Inc. v. Somers, No. 16-1276, 583 U.S. ___ (2018); Seila Law LLC v. Consumer Financial Protection Bureau, No. 19-7, 591 U.S. ___ (2020); Consumer Financial Protection Bureau v. Community Financial Services Ass'n of America, Ltd., No. 22-448, 602 U.S. ___ (2024); SEC v. Jarkesy, No. 22-859, 603 U.S. ___ (2024)

The Dodd–Frank Wall Street Reform and Consumer Protection Act, commonly referred to as the Dodd–Frank Act, is a United States federal law enacted on July 21, 2010, as the primary legislative response to the 2007–2008 financial crisis—the worst financial crisis since the Great Depression. Named for its sponsors, Senator Chris Dodd and Representative Barney Frank, the law was signed by President Barack Obama on July 21, 2010. Its stated purposes are to promote financial stability, end "too big to fail," prevent taxpayer-funded bailouts, and protect consumers from abusive financial practices.

The act reorganized financial regulation through three major reforms: it created the Consumer Financial Protection Bureau (CFPB) to protect consumers against predatory lending and unfair financial practices; it established the Financial Stability Oversight Council (FSOC) to monitor systemic risks and designate firms as "systemically important"; and it created the Orderly Liquidation Authority to wind down large failing financial institutions without taxpayer bailouts.

Key regulatory changes include the Volcker Rule, which restricts banks from making speculative investments with depositor funds; requirements for derivatives to be traded through regulated clearinghouses; enhanced Federal Reserve oversight of large financial institutions; and new standards for mortgage lending and credit rating agencies. The law also strengthened whistleblower protections and established data collection requirements for small business lending.

Dodd–Frank is considered one of the most significant financial laws since the New Deal. The CFPB has returned over $21 billion to consumers harmed by illegal practices. Critics argued the law imposed excessive compliance costs on smaller financial institutions, and in 2018, the Economic Growth, Regulatory Relief, and Consumer Protection Act rolled back certain requirements, particularly for banks with assets below $250 billion.

== Origins and proposal ==
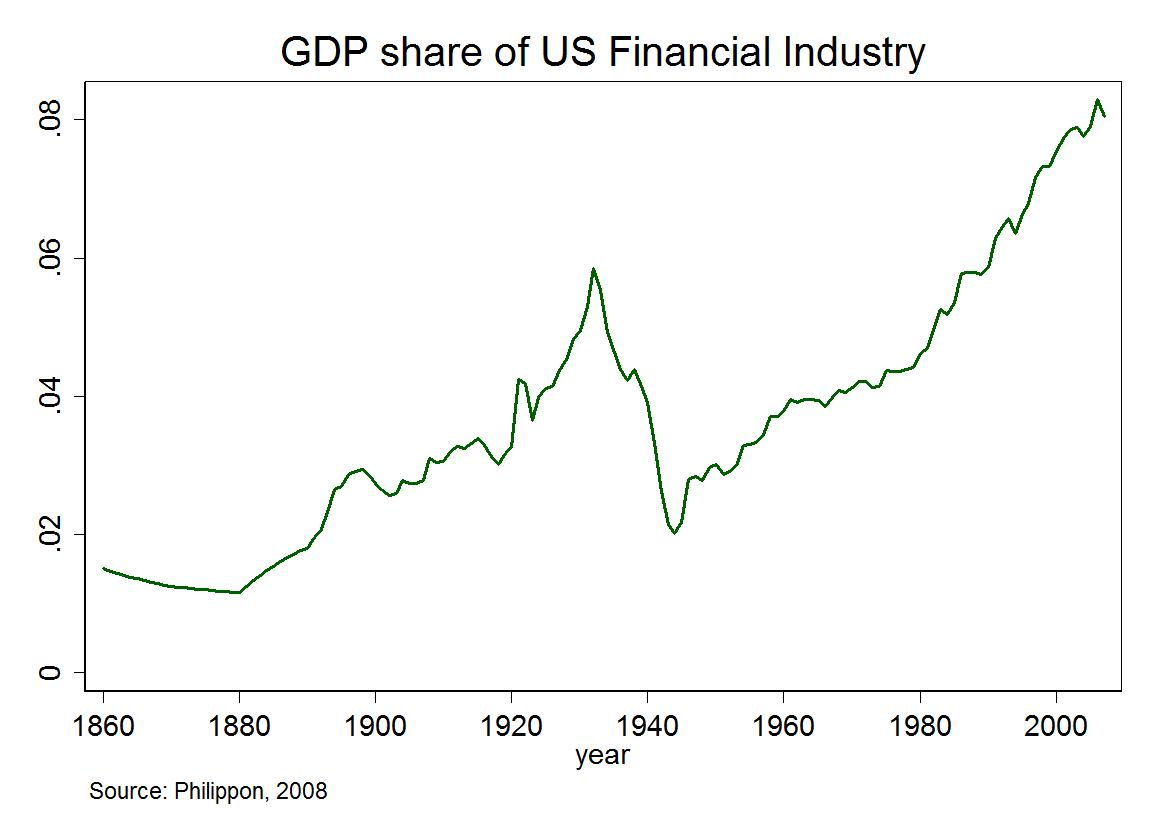
Share in GDP of U.S. financial sector since 1860

The 2008 financial crisis led to widespread calls for changes in the regulatory system. In June 2009, President Obama introduced a proposal for a "sweeping overhaul of the United States financial regulatory system, a transformation on a scale not seen since the reforms that followed the Great Depression".

As the finalized bill emerged from the conference, President Obama said that it included 90 percent of the reforms he had proposed. Major components of Obama's original proposal, listed by the order in which they appear in the "A New Foundation" outline, include:

1. The consolidation of regulatory agencies, elimination of the national thrift charter, and new oversight council to evaluate systemic risk;
2. Comprehensive regulation of financial markets, including increased transparency of derivatives (bringing them onto exchanges);
3. Consumer protection reforms including a new consumer protection agency and uniform standards for "plain vanilla" products as well as strengthened investor protection;
4. Tools for financial crisis, including a "resolution regime" complementing the existing Federal Deposit Insurance Corporation (FDIC) authority to allow for orderly winding down of bankrupt firms, and including a proposal that the Federal Reserve (the "Fed") receive authorization from the Treasury for extensions of credit in "unusual or exigent circumstances"; and
5. Various measures aimed at increasing international standards and cooperation including proposals related to improved accounting and tightened regulation of credit rating agencies.

At President Obama's request, Congress later added the Volcker Rule to this proposal in January 2010.

== Legislative response and passage ==
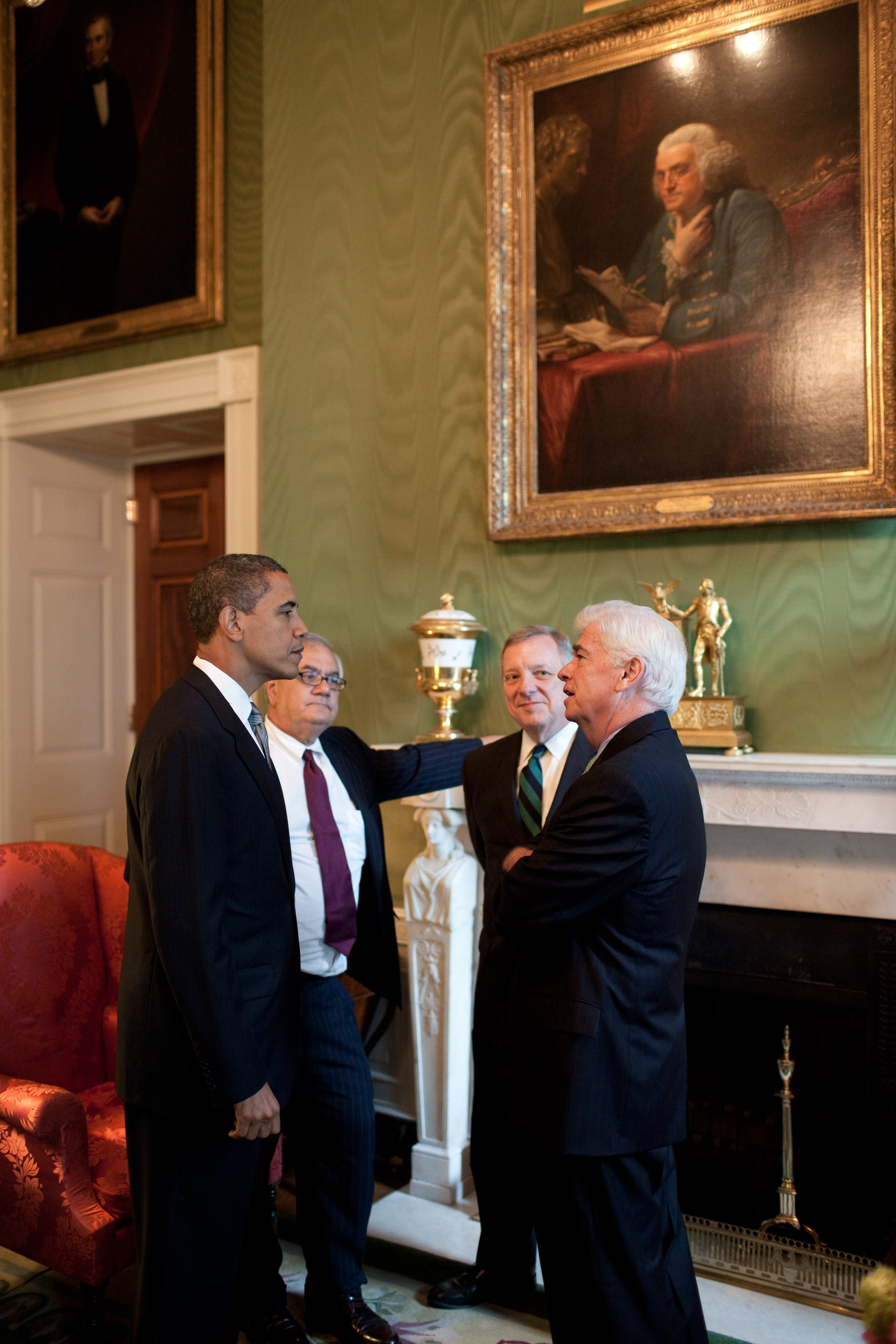
President Barack Obama meeting with Rep. Barney Frank, Sen. Dick Durbin, and Sen. Chris Dodd, at the White House prior to a financial regulatory reform announcement on June 17, 2009

The bills that came after Obama's proposal were largely consistent with the proposal, but contained some additional provisions and differences in implementation.

The Volcker Rule was not included in Obama's initial June 2009 proposal, but Obama proposed the rule later in January 2010, after the House bill had passed. The rule, which prohibits depository banks from proprietary trading (similar to the prohibition of combined investment and commercial banking in the Glass–Steagall Act), was passed only in the Senate bill, and the conference committee enacted the rule in a weakened form, Section 619 of the bill, that allowed banks to invest up to 3 percent of their tier 1 capital in private equity and hedge funds as well as trade for hedging purposes.

On December 2, 2009, revised versions of the bill were introduced in the House of Representatives by then–financial services committee chairman Barney Frank, and in the Senate Banking Committee by former chairman Chris Dodd. The initial version of the bill passed the House largely along party lines in December by a vote of 223 to 202, and passed the Senate with amendments in May 2010 with a vote of 59 to 39 again largely along party lines.

The bill then moved to conference committee, where the Senate bill was used as the base text although a few House provisions were included in the bill's base text. The final bill passed the Senate in a vote of 60-to-39, the minimum margin necessary to defeat a filibuster. Olympia Snowe, Susan Collins, and Scott Brown were the only Republican senators who voted for the bill, while Russ Feingold was the lone Senate Democrat to vote against the bill.

One provision on which the White House did not take a position and remained in the final bill allows the SEC to rule on "proxy access"—meaning that qualifying shareholders, including groups, can modify the corporate proxy statement sent to shareholders to include their own director nominees, with the rules set by the SEC. This rule was unsuccessfully challenged in conference committee by Chris Dodd, who—under pressure from the White House—submitted an amendment limiting that access and ability to nominate directors only to single shareholders who have over 5 percent of the company and have held the stock for at least two years.

The "Durbin amendment" is a provision in the final bill aimed at reducing debit card interchange fees for merchants and increasing competition in payment processing. The provision was not in the House bill; it began as an amendment to the Senate bill from Dick Durbin and led to lobbying against it.

The New York Times published a comparison of the two bills prior to their reconciliation. On June 25, 2010, conferees finished reconciling the House and Senate versions of the bills and four days later filed a conference report. The conference committee changed the name of the Act from the "Restoring American Financial Stability Act of 2010". The House passed the conference report, 237–192 on June 30, 2010. On July 15, the Senate passed the Act, 60–39. President Obama signed the bill into law on July 21, 2010.

=== Repeal efforts ===
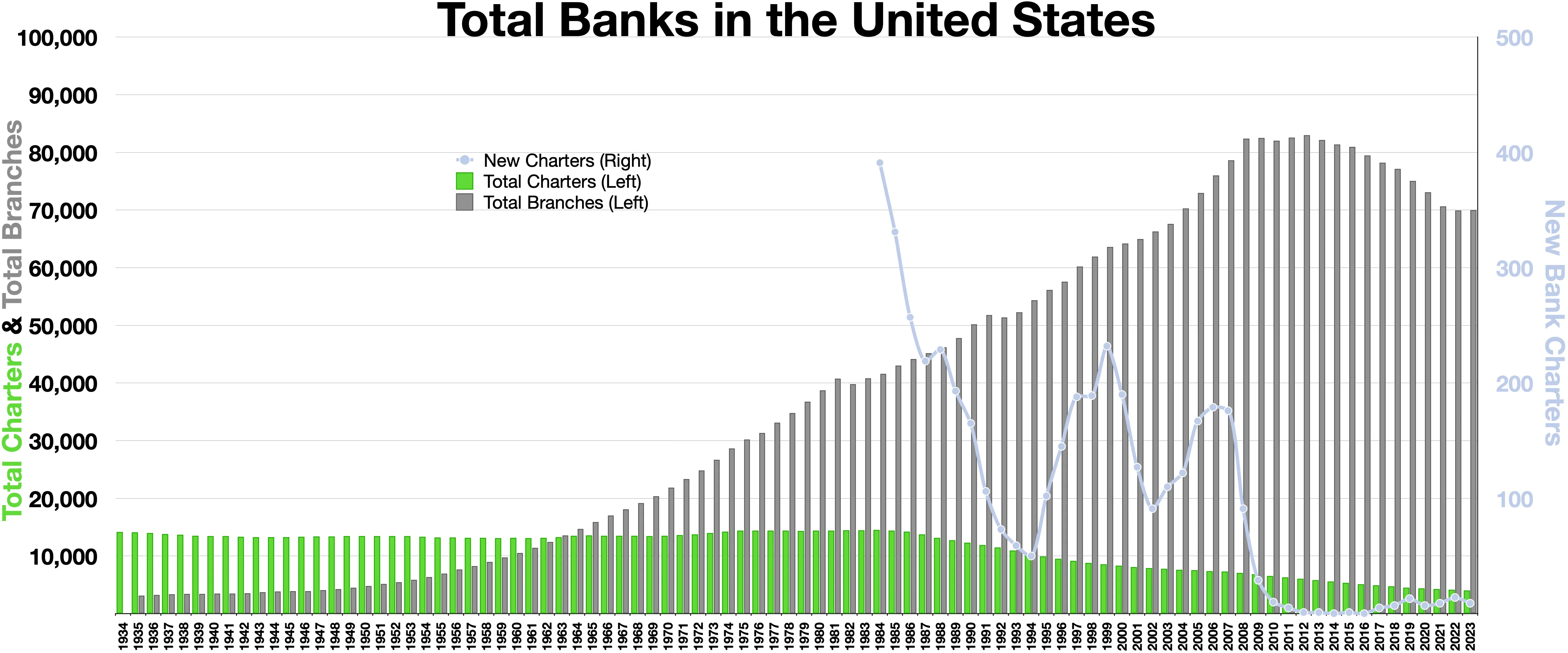
Total banks in the United States New chartered banks (right) Total Charters (left) Total branches (left)

Since the passage of Dodd–Frank, many Republicans have called for a partial or total repeal of Dodd–Frank. On June 9, 2017, The Financial Choice Act, legislation that would "undo significant parts" of Dodd–Frank, passed the House 233–186.

Barney Frank said parts of the act were a mistake and supported the Economic Growth, Regulatory Relief and Consumer Protection Act. On March 14, 2018, the Senate passed the Economic Growth, Regulatory Relief and Consumer Protection Act exempting dozens of U.S. banks under a $250 billion asset threshold from the Dodd–Frank Act's banking regulations. On May 22, 2018, the law passed in the House of Representatives. On May 24, 2018, President Trump signed the partial repeal into law.

== Overview ==
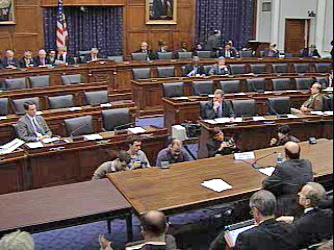
Ben Bernanke (lower-right), Chairman of the Federal Reserve Board of Governors, at a House Financial Services Committee hearing on February 10, 2009

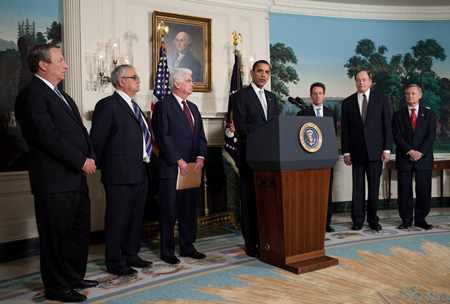
President Barack Obama addresses reporters about the economy and the need for financial reform in the Diplomatic Reception Room of the White House on February 25, 2009.

The Dodd–Frank Wall Street Reform and Consumer Protection Act is categorized into 16 titles and, by one law firm's count, it requires that regulators create 243 rules, conduct 67 studies, and issue 22 periodic reports.

The stated aim of the legislation is:

To promote the financial stability of the United States by improving accountability and transparency in the financial system, to end "too big to fail," to protect the American taxpayer by ending bailouts, to protect consumers from abusive financial services practices, and for other purposes.

The Act changes the existing regulatory structure, by creating a number of new agencies (while merging and removing others) in an effort to streamline the regulatory process, increasing oversight of specific institutions regarded as a systemic risk, amending the Federal Reserve Act, promoting transparency, and additional changes. The Act's intentions are to provide rigorous standards and supervision to protect the economy and American consumers, investors and businesses; end taxpayer-funded bailouts of financial institutions; provide for an advanced warning system on the stability of the economy; create new rules on executive compensation and corporate governance; and eliminate certain loopholes that led to the 2008 economic recession. The new agencies are either granted explicit power over a particular aspect of financial regulation, or that power is transferred from an existing agency. All of the new agencies, and some existing ones that are not currently required to do so, are also compelled to report to Congress on an annual (or biannual) basis, to present the results of current plans and explain future goals. Important new agencies created include the Financial Stability Oversight Council, the Office of Financial Research, and the Consumer Financial Protection Bureau.

Of the existing agencies, changes are proposed, ranging from new powers to the transfer of powers in an effort to enhance the regulatory system. The institutions affected by these changes include most of the regulatory agencies currently involved in monitoring the financial system (Federal Deposit Insurance Corporation [FDIC], U.S. Securities and Exchange Commission [SEC], Office of the Comptroller of the Currency [OCC], Federal Reserve [the "Fed"], the Securities Investor Protection Corporation [SIPC], etc.), and the final elimination of the Office of Thrift Supervision (further described in Title III—Transfer of Powers to the Comptroller, the FDIC, and the FED).

As a practical matter, prior to the passage of Dodd-Frank, investment advisers were not required to register with the SEC if the investment adviser had fewer than 15 clients during the previous 12 months and did not hold himself out generally to the public as an investment adviser. The act eliminates that exemption, rendering numerous additional investment advisers, hedge funds, and private equity firms subject to new registration requirements. However, the Act also shifted oversight of non-exempt investment advisers with less than $100 million in assets under management and not registered in more than 15 states to state regulators. A 2019 study found that this switch in enforcement to state regulators increased misconduct among investment advisers by thirty to forty percent, with a bigger increase in areas with less sophisticated clients, less competition, and among advisers with more conflicts of interest, most likely because on average state regulators have less resources and enforcement capacity compared to the SEC.

Certain non-bank financial institutions and their subsidiaries will be supervised by the Fed in the same manner and to the same extent as if they were a bank holding company.

To the extent that the Act affects all federal financial regulatory agencies, eliminating one (the Office of Thrift Supervision) and creating two (Financial Stability Oversight Council and the Office of Financial Research) in addition to several consumer protection agencies, including the Bureau of Consumer Financial Protection, this legislation in many ways represents a change in the way America's financial markets will operate in the future. Few provisions of the Act became effective when the bill was signed.

== Provisions ==
The law has various titles and provisions relating to:

- Financial Stability;
- Orderly Liquidation Authority;
- Transfer of Powers to the Comptroller, the FDIC, and the Fed;
- Regulation of Advisers to Hedge Funds and Others;
- Insurance;
- Improvements to Regulation;
- Wall Street Transparency and Accountability;
- Payment, Clearing, and Settlement Supervision;
- Investor Protections and Improvements to the Regulation of Securities;
- Bureau of Consumer Financial Protection;
- Federal Reserve System Provisions;
- Improving Access to Mainstream Financial Institutions;
- Pay It Back Act;
- Mortgage Reform and Anti-Predatory Lending Act;
- Miscellaneous Provisions; and
- Section 1256 Contracts;
- Conflict mineral disclosures.

== Reaction ==
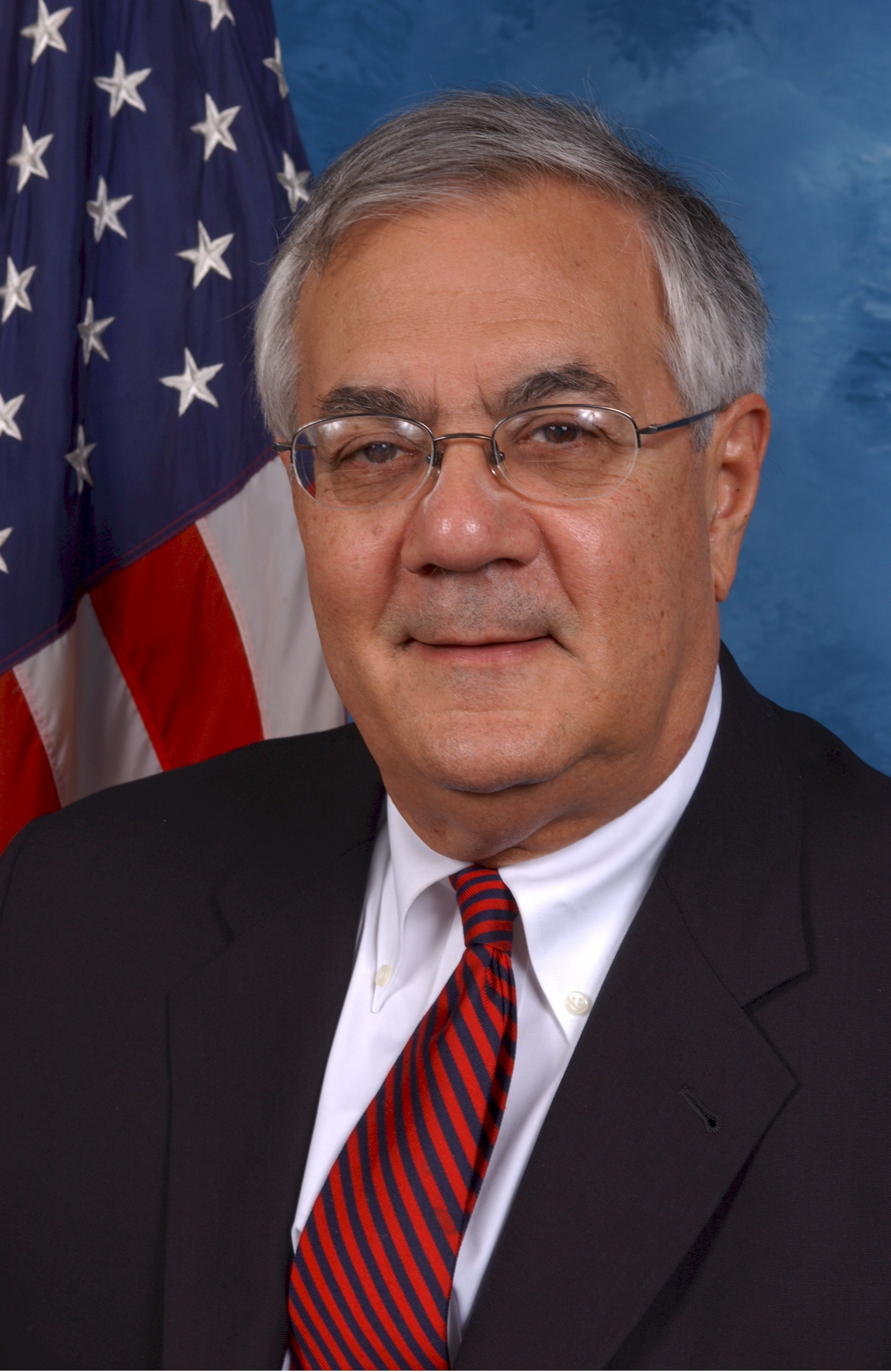
Representative Barney Frank, co-architect of the Act

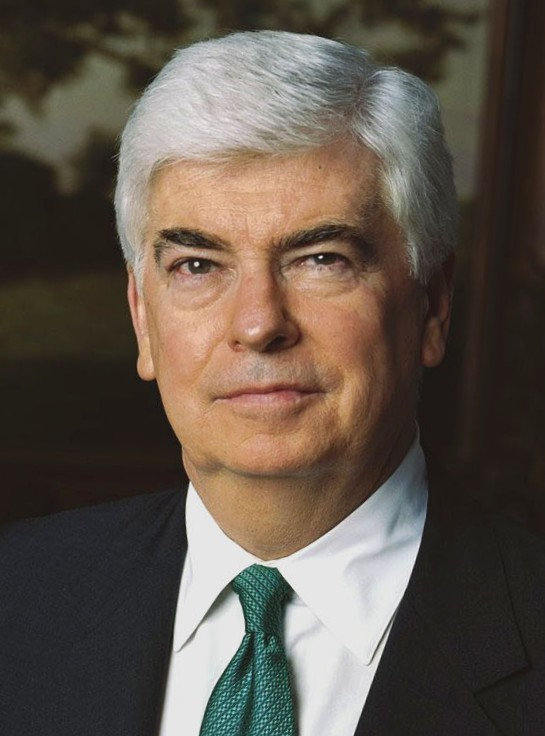
Senator Chris Dodd, co-architect of the Act

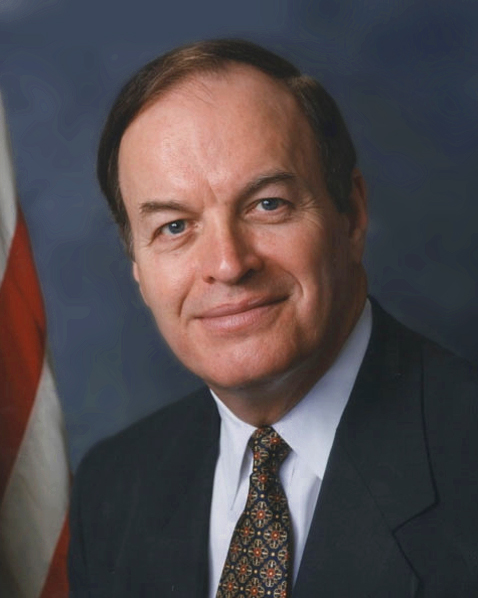
Senator Richard Shelby, the top-ranking Republican on the Senate Banking Committee

=== Legislative reaction ===
Senator Chris Dodd, who co-proposed the legislation, has classified the legislation as "sweeping, bold, comprehensive, [and] long overdue". In regards to the Fed and what he regarded as their failure to protect consumers, Dodd voiced his opinion that "[...] I really want the Federal Reserve to get back to its core enterprises [...] We saw over the last number of years when they took on consumer protection responsibilities and the regulation of bank holding companies, it was an abysmal failure. So the idea that we're going to go back and expand those roles and functions at the expense of the vitality of the core functions that they're designed to perform is going in the wrong way." However, Dodd pointed out that the transfer of powers from the Fed to other agencies should not be construed as criticism of Fed Chairman Ben Bernanke, but rather that "[i]t's about putting together an architecture that works".

Dodd felt it would be a "huge mistake" to craft the bill under the auspices of bipartisan compromise stating "[y]ou're given very few moments in history to make this kind of a difference, and we're trying to do that." Put another way, Dodd construed the lack of Republican amendments as a sign "[...] that the bill is a strong one".

Richard Shelby, the top-ranking Republican on the Senate Banking Committee and the one who proposed the changes to the Fed governance, voiced his reasons for why he felt the changes needed to be made: "It's an obvious conflict of interest [...] It's basically a case where the banks are choosing or having a big voice in choosing their regulator. It's unheard of." Democratic Senator Jack Reed agreed, saying "The whole governance and operation of the Federal Reserve has to be reviewed and should be reviewed. I don't think we can just assume, you know, business as usual."

Barney Frank, who in 2003 told auditors warning him of the risk caused by government subsidies in the mortgage market, "I want to roll the dice a little bit more in this situation toward subsidized housing", proposed his own legislative package of financial reforms in the House, did not comment on the Stability Act directly, but rather indicated that he was pleased that reform efforts were happening at all: "Obviously, the bills aren't going to be identical, but it confirms that we are moving in the same direction and reaffirms my confidence that we are going to be able to get an appropriate, effective reform package passed very soon."

During a Senate Republican press conference on April 21, 2010, Richard Shelby reported that he and Dodd were meeting "every day" and were attempting to forge a bipartisan bill. Shelby also expressed his optimism that a "good bill" will be reached, and that "we're closer than ever." Saxby Chambliss echoed Shelby's sentiments, saying, "I feel exactly as Senator Shelby does about the Banking Committee negotiations," but voiced his concern about maintaining an active derivatives market and not driving financial firms overseas. Kay Bailey Hutchison indicated her desire to see state banks have access to the Fed, while Orrin Hatch had concerns over transparency, and the lack of Fannie and Freddie reform.

=== Industry and other groups ===
Ed Yingling, president of the American Bankers Association, regarded the reforms as haphazard and dangerous, saying, "To some degree, it looks like they're just blowing up everything for the sake of change.... If this were to happen, the regulatory system would be in chaos for years. You have to look at the real-world impact of this."

The Securities Industry and Financial Markets Association (SIFMA)—the "top Wall Street lobby"—has expressed support for the law, and has urged Congress not to change or repeal it in order to prevent a stronger law from passing.

A survey by Rimes Technologies Corp of senior investment banking figures in the U.S. and UK showed that 86 percent expect that Dodd–Frank will significantly increase the cost of their data operations. Big banks "complained for years about a key feature of the Dodd–Frank overhaul requiring them to keep billions of dollars in cash in reserves." In 2019 some, such as Wells-Fargo, offered higher deposit rates to government lenders, freeing up deposits previously held to maintain the required liquid coverage ratio.

Continental European scholars have also discussed the necessity of far-reaching banking reforms in light of the current crisis of confidence, recommending the adoption of binding regulations that would go further than Dodd–Frank—notably in France where SFAF and World Pensions Council (WPC) banking experts have argued that, beyond national legislations, such rules should be adopted and implemented within the broader context of separation of powers in European Union law. This perspective has gained ground after the unraveling of the Libor scandal in July 2012, with mainstream opinion leaders such as the Financial Times editorialists calling for the adoption of an EU-wide "Glass Steagall II".

=== Job creation ===
An editorial in the Wall Street Journal speculated that the law would make it more expensive for startups to raise capital and create new jobs; other opinion pieces suggest that such an impact would be due to a reduction in fraud or other misconduct.

=== Corporate governance issues and U.S. public corporations ===
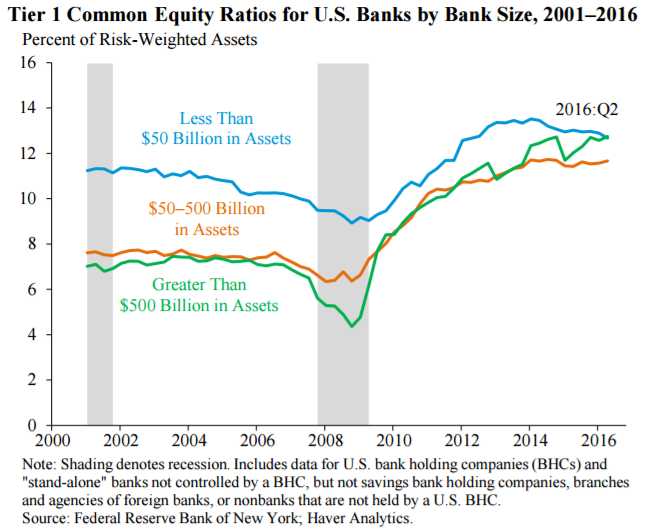
The tier 1 ratio represents the strength of the financial cushion that a bank maintains; the higher the ratio, the stronger the financial position of the bank, other things equal. Dodd–Frank set standards for improving this ratio and has been successful in that regard.

The Dodd–Frank Act has several provisions that call upon the Securities and Exchange Commission (SEC) to implement several new rules and regulations that will affect corporate governance issues surrounding public corporations in the United States. Many of the provisions put in place by Dodd–Frank require the SEC to implement new regulations, but intentionally do not give specifics as to when regulations should be adopted or exactly what the regulations should be. This will allow the SEC to implement new regulations over several years and make adjustments as it analyzes the environment. Public companies will have to work to adopt new policies in order to adapt to the changing regulatory environment they will face over the coming years.

Section 951 of Dodd–Frank deals with executive compensation. The provisions require the SEC to implement rules that require proxy statements for shareholder meetings to include a vote for shareholders to approve executive compensation by voting on "say on pay" and "golden parachutes." SEC regulations require that at least once every three years shareholders have a non-binding say-on-pay vote on executive compensation. While shareholders are required to have a say-on-pay vote at least every three years, they can also elect to vote annually, every two years, or every third year. The regulations also require that shareholders have a vote at least every six years to decide how often they would like to have say-on-pay votes. In addition, companies are required to disclose any golden parachute compensation that may be paid out to executives in the case of a merger, acquisition, or sale of major assets. Proxy statements must also give shareholders the chance to cast a non-binding vote to approve golden parachute policies. Although these votes are non-binding and do not take precedence over the decisions of the board, failure to give the results of votes due consideration can cause negative shareholder reactions. Regulations covering these requirements were implemented in January 2011 and took effect in April 2011.

Section 952 of Dodd–Frank deals with independent compensation committees as well as their advisors and legal teams. These provisions require the SEC to make national stock exchanges set standards for the compensation committees of publicly traded companies listed on these exchanges. Under these standards national stock exchanges are prohibited from listing public companies that do not have an independent compensation committee. To insure that compensation committees remain independent, the SEC is required to identify any areas that may create a potential conflict of interest and work to define exactly what requirements must be met for the committee to be considered independent. Some of the areas examined for conflicts of interest include other services provided by advisors, personal relationships between advisors and shareholders, advisor fees as a percentage of their company's revenue, and advisors' stock holdings. These provisions also cover advisors and legal teams serving compensation committees by requiring proxy statements to disclose any compensation consultants and include a review of each to ensure no conflicts of interest exist. Compensation committees are fully responsible for selecting advisors and determining their compensation. Final regulations covering issues surrounding compensation committees were implemented in June 2012 by the SEC and took effect in July 2012. Under these regulations, the New York Stock Exchange (NYSE) and NASDAQ also added their own rules regarding the retention of committee advisors. These regulations were approved by the SEC in 2013 and took full effect in early 2014.

Section 953 of Dodd–Frank deals with pay for performance policies to determine executive compensation. Provisions from this section require the SEC to make regulations regarding the disclosure of executive compensation as well as regulations on how executive compensation is determined. New regulations require that compensation paid to executives be directly linked to financial performance including consideration of any changes in the value of the company's stock price or value of dividends paid out. The compensation of executives and the financial performance justifying it are both required to be disclosed. In addition, regulations require that CEO compensation be disclosed alongside the median employee compensation excluding CEO compensation, along with ratios comparing levels of compensation between the two. Regulations regarding pay for performance were proposed by the SEC in September 2013 and were adopted in August 2015.

Section 954 of Dodd–Frank deals with clawback of compensation policies, which work to ensure that executives do not profit from inaccurate financial reporting. These provisions require the SEC to create regulations that must be adopted by national stock exchanges, which in turn require publicly traded companies who wish to be listed on the exchange to have clawback policies. These policies require executives to return inappropriately awarded compensation, as set forth in section 953 regarding pay for performance, in the case of an accounting restatement due to noncompliance with reporting requirements. If an accounting restatement is made then the company must recover any compensation paid to current or former executives associated with the company the three years prior to the restatement. The SEC proposed regulations dealing with clawback of compensation in July 2015.

Section 955 of Dodd–Frank deals with employees' and directors' hedging practices. These provisions stipulate that the SEC must implement rules requiring public companies to disclose in proxy statements whether or not employees and directors of the company are permitted to hold a short position on any equity shares of the company. This applies to both employees and directors who are compensated with company stock as well as those who are simply owners of company stock. The SEC proposed rules regarding hedging in February 2015.

Section 957 deals with broker voting and relates to section 951 dealing with executive compensation. While section 951 requires say on pay and golden parachute votes from shareholders, section 957 requires national exchanges to prohibit brokers from voting on executive compensation. In addition, the provisions in this section prevent brokers from voting on any major corporate governance issue as determined by the SEC including the election of board members. This gives shareholders more influence on important issues since brokers tend to vote shares in favor of executives. Brokers may only vote shares if they are directly instructed to do so by shareholders associated with the shares. The SEC approved the listing rules set forth by the NYSE and NASDAQ regarding provisions from section 957 in September 2010.

Additional provisions set forth by Dodd–Frank in section 972 require public companies to disclose in proxy statements reasons for why the current CEO and chairman of the board hold their positions. The same rule applies to new appointments for CEO or chairman of the board. Public companies must find reasons supporting their decisions to retain an existing chairman of the board or CEO or reasons for selecting new ones to keep shareholders informed.

Provisions from Dodd–Frank found in section 922 also address whistleblower protection. Under new regulations any whistleblowers who voluntarily expose inappropriate behavior in public corporations can be rewarded with substantial compensation and will have their jobs protected. Regulations entitle whistleblowers to between ten and thirty percent of any monetary sanctions put on the corporation above one million dollars. These provisions also enact anti-retaliation rules that entitle whistleblowers the right to have a jury trial if they feel they have been wrongfully terminated as a result of whistleblowing. If the jury finds that whistleblowers have been wrongfully terminated, then they must be reinstated to their positions and receive compensation for any back-pay and legal fees. This rule also applies to any private subsidiaries of public corporations. The SEC put these regulations in place in May 2011.

Section 971 of Dodd–Frank deals with proxy access and shareholders' ability to nominate candidates for director positions in public companies. Provisions in the section allow shareholders to use proxy materials to contact and form groups with other shareholders in order to nominate new potential directors. In the past, activist investors had to pay to have materials prepared and mailed to other investors in order to solicit their help on issues. Any shareholder group that has held at least three percent of voting shares for a period of at least three years is entitled to make director nominations. However, shareholder groups may not nominate more than twenty-five percent of a company's board and may always nominate at least one member even if that one nomination would represent over twenty-five percent of the board. If multiple shareholder groups make nominations then the nominations from groups with the most voting power will be considered first with additional nominations being considered up to the twenty-five percent cap.

== Constitutional challenge ==
On July 12, 2012, the Competitive Enterprise Institute joined the State National Bank of Big Spring, Texas, and the 60 Plus Association as plaintiffs in a lawsuit filed in the U.S. District Court for the District of Columbia, challenging the constitutionality of provisions of Dodd–Frank. The complaint asked the court to invalidate the law, arguing that it gives the federal government unprecedented, unchecked power. The lawsuit was amended on September 20, 2012, to include the states of Oklahoma, South Carolina, and Michigan as plaintiffs. The states asked the court to review the constitutionality of the Orderly Liquidation Authority established under Title II of Dodd–Frank.

In February 2013 Kansas attorney general Derek Schmidt announced that Kansas along with Alabama, Georgia, Ohio, Oklahoma, Nebraska, Michigan, Montana, South Carolina, Texas, and West Virginia would join the lawsuit. The second amended complaint included those new states as plaintiffs.

On August 1, 2013, U.S. District Judge Ellen Segal Huvelle dismissed the lawsuit for lack of standing. In July 2015, the Court of Appeals for the District of Columbia Circuit affirmed in part and reversed in part, holding that the bank, but not the states that later joined the lawsuit, had standing to challenge the law, and returned the case to Huvelle for further proceedings.

On January 14, 2019, the Supreme Court refused to review the District of Columbia Circuit's decision to dismiss their challenge to the constitutionality of the CFPB's structure as an "independent" agency.

== Impact ==
=== Congressional Budget Office ===
On April 21, 2010, the Congressional Budget Office (CBO) released a cost-estimate of enacting the legislation. In its introduction, the CBO briefly discussed the legislation and then went on to generally state that it is unable to assess the cost of financial crises under current law, and added that estimating the cost of similar crises under this legislation (or other proposed ideas) is equally (and inherently) difficult: "[...] CBO has not determined whether the estimated costs under the Act would be smaller or larger than the costs of alternative approaches to addressing future financial crises and the risks they pose to the economy as a whole."

In terms of the impact on the federal budget, the CBO estimates that deficits would reduce between 2011 and 2020, in part due to the risk-based assessment fees levied to initially capitalize the Orderly Liquidation Fund; after which, a growing amount of revenue for the Fund would be derived from interest payments (which are not counted as budgetary receipts, and therefore do not affect the federal deficit, having the effect of negatively impacting budget figures related to the Fund). As such, the CBO projects that eventually the money being paid into the Fund (in the form of fees) would be exceeded by the expenses of the Fund itself.

The cost estimate also raises questions about the time-frame of capitalizing the Fund – their estimate took the projected value of fees collected for the Fund (and interest collected on the Fund) weighed against the expected expense of having to deal with corporate defaults until 2020. Their conclusion was it would take longer than 10 years to fully capitalize the Fund (at which point they estimated it would be approximately 45 billion), although no specifics beyond that were expressed.

The projection was a $5 billion or more deficit increase in at least one of the four consecutive ten-year periods starting in 2021.

=== Effects on small banks ===
Associated Press reported that in response to the costs that the legislation places on banks, some banks have ended the practice of giving their customers free checking. Small banks have been forced to end some businesses such as mortgages and car loans in response to the new regulations. The size of regulatory compliance teams has grown.

In 2013, The Heritage Foundation called attention to the new ability of borrowers to sue lenders for misjudging their ability to repay a loan, predicting that smaller lenders would be forced to exit the mortgage market due to increased risk.

One Harvard University study concluded that smaller banks have been hurt by the regulations of the Dodd–Frank Act, saying "Community banks' share of the U.S. banking assets and lending market fell from over 40% in 1994 to around 20% [in 2015]." These researchers believed that regulatory barriers fell most heavily on small banks, even though legislators intended to target large financial institutions. Though other experts dispute this claim noting that community banks have been consolidating since the Riegle–Neal Act of 1994 and even claim that community banks have been doing better since 2010 citing the decrease in community bank failures after the act was passed.

Complying with the statute seems to have resulted in job shifting or job creation in the business of fulfilling reporting requirements, while making it more difficult to fire employees who report criminal violations. Opponents of the Dodd–Frank law believe that it will affect job creation, in a sense that because of stricter regulation unemployment will increase significantly. However, the Office of Management and Budget attempts to "monetize" benefits versus costs to prove the contrary. The result is a positive relationship where benefits exceed costs: "During a 10-year period OMB reviewed 106 major regulations for which cost and benefit data were available [...] $136 billion to $651 billion in annual benefits versus $44 billion to $62 billion in annual costs" (Shapiro and Irons, 2011, p. 8).

=== Scholarly views ===
According to Federal Reserve Chairwoman Janet Yellen in August 2017, "The balance of research suggests that the core reforms we have put in place have substantially boosted resilience without unduly limiting credit availability or economic growth."

Some experts have argued that Dodd–Frank does not protect consumers adequately and does not end too big to fail. Research also finds that Dodd–Frank's increased regulation of credit rating agencies negatively impacted financing and investment of firms worried about their credit ratings.

Law professor and bankruptcy expert David Skeel concluded that the law has two major themes: "government partnership with the largest Wall Street banks and financial institutions" and "a system of ad hoc interventions by regulators that are divorced from basic rule-of-law constraints." While he states that "the overall pattern of the legislation is disturbing," he also concludes that some are clearly helpful, such as the derivatives exchanges and the Consumer Financial Protection Bureau.

Regarding the Republican-led rollback of some provisions of Dodd–Frank in 2018, this move from increased regulation after a crisis to deregulation during an economic boom has been a recurrent feature in the United States.

=== Whistleblower-driven settlements ===
The SEC's 2017 annual report on the Dodd–Frank whistleblower program stated: "Since the program's inception, the SEC has ordered wrongdoers in enforcement matters involving whistleblower information to pay over $975 million in total monetary sanctions, including more than $671 million in disgorgement of ill-gotten gains and interest, the majority of which has been...returned to harmed investors." Whistleblowers receive 10–30% of this amount under the Act. A decade after it was created, the SEC whistleblower program has enabled the SEC to take enforcement actions resulting in over $2.5 billion in financial remedies and putting about $500 million in the pockets of defrauded investors. In addition, the incentives have generated more than 33,300 tips.

=== Consumer Financial Protection Bureau activities ===
The Act established the Consumer Financial Protection Bureau (CFPB), which has the mission of protecting consumers in the financial markets. Then–CFPB Director Richard Cordray testified on April 5, 2017, that: "Over the past five years, we have returned almost $12 billion to 29 million consumers and imposed about $600 million in civil penalties." The CFPB publishes a semi-annual report on its activities.

== See also ==
- 2008 financial crisis
- Brown–Kaufman amendment
- NYSE Chicago
- Commodity Futures Trading Commission
- Financial privacy laws in the United States
- Financial regulation
- NASDAQ
- New York Stock Exchange
- Office of Financial Research
- Regulation D (SEC)
- Regulatory responses to the subprime crisis
- Securities Commission
- Securities regulation in the United States
- Stock exchange
- Subprime mortgage crisis solutions debate
- Swiss referendum "against corporate Rip-offs" of 2013
- Trading Places
- Volcker Rule
- Wall Street reform
- Comprehensive Capital Analysis and Review

=== Related legislation ===
- 1933: Securities Act of 1933
- 1934: Securities Exchange Act of 1934
- 1938: Temporary National Economic Committee (establishment)
- 1939: Trust Indenture Act of 1939
- 1940: Investment Advisers Act of 1940
- 1940: Investment Company Act of 1940
- 1968: Williams Act (Securities Disclosure Act)
- 1975: Securities and Exchange Act
- 1982: Garn–St. Germain Depository Institutions Act
- 1999: Gramm–Leach–Bliley Act
- 2000: Commodity Futures Modernization Act of 2000
- 2002: Sarbanes–Oxley Act
- 2003: Fair and Accurate Credit Transactions Act of 2003
- 2006: Credit Rating Agency Reform Act of 2006
- 2018: Economic Growth, Regulatory Relief and Consumer Protection Act
