= Williams Act =

1968 law amending the Securities and Exchange Act of 1934

- Long title: An act providing for full disclosure of corporate equity ownership of securities under the Securities Exchange Act of 1934
- Enacted by: the 90th United States Congress
- Effective: July 29, 1968

Citations
- Public law: 90-439
- Statutes at Large: 82 Stat. 455

Codification
- Titles amended: 15

Legislative history
- Signed into law by President Lyndon B. Johnson on July 29, 1968

United States Supreme Court cases
- Piper v. Chris-Craft Industries, Inc. Rondeau v. Mosinee Paper Corp.

The Williams Act (USA) refers to 1968 amendments to the Securities Exchange Act of 1934 enacted in 1968 regarding tender offers. The legislation was proposed by Senator Harrison A. Williams of New Jersey.

The Williams Act amended the Securities and Exchange Act of 1934 (15 U.S.C. § 78a et seq.) to require mandatory disclosure of information regarding cash tender offers. When an individual, group, or corporation seeks to acquire control of another corporation, it may make a tender offer. A tender offer is a proposal to buy shares of stock from the stockholders for cash or some type of corporate security of the acquiring company. Since the mid-1960s, cash tender offers for corporate takeovers have become favored over the traditional alternative, the proxy campaign. A proxy campaign is an attempt to obtain the votes of enough shareholders to gain control of the corporation's board of directors.

Because of abuses with cash tender offers, Congress passed the Williams Act in 1968, whose purpose is to require full and fair disclosure for the benefit of stockholders, while at the same time providing the offeror and management equal opportunity to fairly present their cases.

The act requires any person who makes a cash tender offer (which is usually 15-20% in excess of the current market price) for a corporation, that is required to be registered under federal law, to disclose to the federal Securities and Exchange Commission (SEC) the source of the funds used in the offer, the purpose for which the offer is made, the plans the purchaser might have if successful, and any contracts or understandings concerning the target corporation.

Filing and public disclosures with the SEC are also required of anyone who acquires more than 5 percent of the outstanding shares of any class of a corporation subject to federal registration requirements. Copies of these disclosure statements must also be sent to each national securities exchange where the securities are traded, making the information available to shareholders and investors.

The law also imposes miscellaneous substantive restrictions on the mechanics of a cash tender offer, and it imposes a broad prohibition against the use of false, misleading, or incomplete statements in connection with a tender offer. The law gives the SEC the authority to institute enforcement lawsuits.

In recent years, as complicated forms of derivatives bearing upon but not actually constituting corporate stock have become common, interpretation of the Williams Act has become tricky. This development came to a head in 2008 over the railroad company CSX Corporation.

== See also ==
- Securities regulation in the United States
- Commodity Futures Trading Commission
- Securities Commission
- Chicago Stock Exchange
- Financial regulation
- NASDAQ
- New York Stock Exchange
- Stock exchange
- Regulation D (SEC)

Related legislation

- 1933 - Securities Act of 1933
- 1934 – Securities Exchange Act of 1934
- 1938 – Temporary National Economic Committee (establishment)
- 1939 - Trust Indenture Act of 1939
- 1940 - Investment Advisers Act of 1940
- 1940 - Investment Company Act of 1940
- 1975 – Securities Acts Amendments of 1975
- 1982 – Garn–St. Germain Depository Institutions Act
- 1999 – Gramm-Leach-Bliley Act
- 2000 – Commodity Futures Modernization Act of 2000
- 2002 – Sarbanes–Oxley Act
- 2006 - Credit Rating Agency Reform Act of 2006
- 2010 – Dodd–Frank Wall Street Reform and Consumer Protection Act
