= Enron loophole =

Loophole in energy commodity trading

The "Enron loophole" exempts most over-the-counter energy trades and trading on electronic energy commodity markets from government regulation.

The "loophole" was enacted in sections § 2(h) and (g) of the Commodity Futures Modernization Act of 2000, signed by U.S. president Bill Clinton on December 21, 2000. It allowed for the creation, for U.S. exchanges, of a new kind of derivative security, the single-stock future, which had been prohibited since 1982 under the Shad-Johnson Accord, a jurisdictional pact between John S. R. Shad, then chairman of the U.S. Securities and Exchange Commission, and Phil Johnson, then chairman of the Commodity Futures Trading Commission.

In September 2007, Senator Carl Levin (D-MI) introduced Senate Bill S. 2058 specifically to close the "Enron Loophole". This bill was later attached to H.R. 6124, the Food, Conservation, and Energy Act of 2008, also known as "The 2008 Farm Bill". President George W. Bush vetoed the bill, but was overridden by both the House and Senate, and on June 18, 2008 the bill was enacted into law.

Wendy Gramm, Senator Phil Gramm's wife, coincidentally was the former chairman of the Commodity Futures Trading Commission from February 22, 1988 to January 22, 1993. After leaving the CFTC, she took a seat on Enron's board of directors.

On June 22, 2008, then U.S. Senator Barack Obama blamed the "Enron loophole" for allowing speculators to run up the cost of fuel by operating outside federal regulation.

== See also ==
- Commodity Futures Modernization Act of 2000
- Energy law
