= Garn–St. Germain Depository Institutions Act =

US federal act on finance

Garn–St Germain Depository Institutions Act
- Other short titles: Banking Affiliates Act of 1982; Deposit Insurance Flexibility Act; Net Worth Certificate Act; Thrift Institutions Restructuring Act of 1982
- Long title: An Act to revitalize the housing industry by strengthening the financial stability of home mortgage lending institutions and ensuring the availability of home mortgage loans.
- Nicknames: Alternative Mortgage Transaction Parity Act of 1982
- Enacted by: the 97th United States Congress
- Effective: October 15, 1982

Citations
- Public law: 97-320
- Statutes at Large: 96 Stat. 1469

Codification
- Titles amended: 12 U.S.C.: Banks and Banking
- U.S.C. sections amended: 12 U.S.C. ch. 3 § 226

Legislative history
- Introduced in the House as H.R. 6267 by Fernand St Germain (D–RI) on May 4, 1982; Committee consideration by House Banking, Finance, and Urban Affairs, Senate Banking, Housing, and Urban Affairs; Passed the House on May 20, 1982 (272-91); Passed the Senate on September 24, 1982 (passed voice vote, in lieu of S. 2879); Reported by the joint conference committee on September 30, 1982; agreed to by the Senate on September 30, 1982 (agreed voice vote) and by the House on October 1, 1982 (agreed voice vote); Signed into law by President Ronald Reagan on October 15, 1982

The Garn–St Germain Depository Institutions Act of 1982 (Pub. L. 97–320, H.R. 6267, enacted October 15, 1982) is an act of Congress that deregulated savings and loan associations and allowed banks to provide adjustable-rate mortgage loans. It is disputed whether the act was a mitigating or contributing factor in the savings and loan crisis of the late 1980s.

The bill, whose full title was "An Act to revitalize the housing industry by strengthening the financial stability of home mortgage lending institutions and ensuring the availability of home mortgage loans," was a Reagan Administration initiative.

The bill is named after its sponsors, Congressman Fernand St Germain, Democrat of Rhode Island, and Senator Jake Garn, Republican of Utah. The bill had broad support in Congress, with co-sponsors including Chuck Schumer and Steny Hoyer. The bill passed overwhelmingly, by a margin of 272–91 in the House.

An important consumer change was to allow anyone to place real estate, consisting of one to four dwelling units, into their own trust without triggering the due-on-sale clause. The due-on-sale clause allows lenders to foreclose on a current loan upon transfer to another. This greatly facilitates the use of trusts to pass property to heirs and minors. It may also protect the property of wealthy or risky owners against the possibility of future lawsuits or creditors, because the trust owns the property, not the individuals at risk. The bill states "... a lender may not exercise its option pursuant to a due-on-sale clause upon ... a transfer into an inter vivos trust in which the borrower is and remains a beneficiary and which does not relate to a transfer of rights of occupancy in the property[.]" (The Garn st Germain Depository Institutions Act of 1982, (U.S.C.) 1701j-3(d)(8).)

Title VIII of the act, Alternative Mortgage Transactions, allowed banks to provide adjustable-rate mortgage loans.

The bill's passage is considered an important shift in the Democratic Party's positioning on economic regulation, as the party had historically defended New Deal era financial regulations, but had now come to favor financial deregulation. According to a 2022 study, this shift happened as a consequence of the congressional reforms of the 1970s, which undermined parochial and Southern populist interests within the Democratic Party. These parochial and populist interests favored a decentralized banking system. The party subsequently pursued deregulatory reforms that it perceived as beneficial to savers and consumers.

== See also ==
- Securities regulation in the United States
- Commodity Futures Trading Commission
- Securities commission
- Chicago Stock Exchange
- Financial regulation
- NASDAQ
- New York Stock Exchange
- Stock exchange
- Regulation D (SEC)

Related legislation

- 1933 – Securities Act of 1933
- 1934 – Securities Exchange Act of 1934
- 1938 – Temporary National Economic Committee (establishment)
- 1939 – Trust Indenture Act of 1939
- 1940 – Investment Advisers Act of 1940
- 1940 – Investment Company Act of 1940
- 1968 – Williams Act (Securities Disclosure Act)
- 1975 – Securities Acts Amendments of 1975
- 1980 - Depository Institutions Deregulation and Monetary Control Act
- 1989 - Financial Institutions Reform, Recovery, and Enforcement Act of 1989
- 1999 – Gramm–Leach–Bliley Act
- 2000 – Commodity Futures Modernization Act of 2000
- 2002 – Sarbanes–Oxley Act
- 2006 – Credit Rating Agency Reform Act of 2006
- 2010 – Dodd–Frank Wall Street Reform and Consumer Protection Act
