= Trust Indenture Act of 1939 =

US federal law regulating debt securities

- Enacted by: the 76th United States Congress

Citations
- Public law: Pub. L. 76–253
- Statutes at Large: 53 Stat. 1149

Codification
- Acts amended: Securities Act of 1933 (inserted as Title III)
- U.S.C. sections created: 15 U.S.C. §§ 77aaa–77bbbb

Legislative history
- Introduced in the Senate as S. 2065; Committee consideration by Senate Banking and Currency Committee, House Interstate and Foreign Commerce Committee; Passed the Senate on May 2, 1939; Passed the House on July 19, 1939 with amendment; Senate agreed to House amendment on July 21, 1939 (); Signed into law by President Franklin D. Roosevelt on August 3, 1939

Major amendments
- Act as amended (amendments noted by section)

The Trust Indenture Act of 1939 (TIA), codified at 15 U.S.C. §§ 77aaa–77bbbb, supplements the Securities Act of 1933 in the case of the distribution of debt securities in the United States. Generally speaking, the TIA requires the appointment of a suitably independent and qualified trustee to act for the benefit of the holders of the securities, and specifies various substantive provisions for the trust indenture that must be entered into by the issuer and the trustee. The TIA is administered by the U.S. Securities and Exchange Commission (SEC), which has made various regulations under the act.

== History ==
Section 211 of The Securities Exchange Act of 1934 mandated that the SEC conduct various studies. Although not expressly required to study the trustee system then in use for the issuance of debt securities, William O. Douglas, who would later become a Commissioner and then Chair of the SEC, was convinced by November 1934 that the system needed legislative reform. In June 1936, the Protective Committee Study, headed by Douglas, published its report Trustees Under Indentures. It recommended that:

1. trustees of indentures be disqualified where they have or acquire conflicts of interest incompatible with their fiduciary obligations;
2. they be transformed into active trustees with respect to their obligations; and
3. legislation separate from the Securities Exchange Act of 1934 would be more appropriate to govern this matter.

The Trust Indenture Act was subsequently passed and signed into law in August 1939. Its legislative history shows that that Congress intended to address deficiencies prevalent in trust indentures at the time:

- the failure of indentures to require evidence of an obligor’s performance thereunder,
- the lack of disclosure and reporting requirements, and
- the presence of significant obstacles to collective bondholder action.

== Framework ==
=== Regulatory ===
Subject to certain exceptions, it is unlawful for any person to sell notes, bonds, or debentures in interstate commerce unless the security has been issued under an indenture and qualified under the Act. Trustees appointed under such indentures have specified duties:

- § 314(d) requires certificates and opinions as to the fair value of the collateral being released, but relief in the form of a "no-action letter" is available from the SEC in certain circumstances
- § 313(b) requires specified reports to holders with respect to the release of collateral

Complications as to financial reporting requirements can arise where the indentures are secured by a pledge of stock, in which case Rule 3-16 of Regulation S-X may come into play. Many issuers attempt to mitigate the impact by inserting "collateral cut-back" provisions into their indentures, but the SEC has not endorsed the concept that such a cut-back does not constitute a release of collateral.

=== Statutory prohibition of impairment ===
§ 316(b) provides that "the right of any holder of any indenture security to receive payment of the principal of and interest on such indenture security, on or after the respective due dates expressed in such indenture security, or to institute suit for the enforcement of any such payment on or after such respective dates, shall not be impaired or affected without the consent of such holder..." This prohibition is subject to several exceptions:

- the temporary postponement of interest payments under § 316(a)(2)
- an indenture may contain a provision limiting or denying the right of a bondholder to sue if and to the extent that that suit would, under applicable law, result in an adverse effect on a lien securing the bonds.
- an application under Chapter 11 of the Bankruptcy Code

This provision saw little litigation prior to 1992. Recent jurisprudence (especially in the Southern District of New York) has expanded its reach, holding that the Act "protects the ability, and not merely the formal right, to receive payment in some circumstances," and ruling that impairment includes stripping a company's assets and removing any corporate guarantees. While this may result in more distressed issuers resorting to Chapter 11 to pursue restructuring efforts, other issuers may be prohibited from filing for such relief—by virtue of their reliance on federal funding or otherwise—and thus may be precluded from altering the repayment terms of their bond debt altogether.

== See also ==
- Securities regulation in the United States
- Commodity Futures Trading Commission
- Securities commission
- Chicago Stock Exchange
- Financial regulation
- NASDAQ
- New York Stock Exchange
- Stock exchange
- Regulation D (SEC)

=== Related legislation ===
- 1933 – Securities Act of 1933
- 1934 – Securities Exchange Act of 1934
- 1938 – Temporary National Economic Committee (establishment)
- 1939 – Trust Indenture Act of 1939
- 1940 – Investment Advisers Act of 1940
- 1940 – Investment Company Act of 1940
- 1968 – Williams Act (Securities Disclosure Act)
- 1975 – Securities Acts Amendments of 1975
- 1982 – Garn–St. Germain Depository Institutions Act
- 1999 – Gramm-Leach-Bliley Act
- 2000 – Commodity Futures Modernization Act of 2000
- 2002 – Sarbanes–Oxley Act
- 2006 – Credit Rating Agency Reform Act of 2006
- 2010 – Dodd–Frank Wall Street Reform and Consumer Protection Act
