= Investment Advisers Act of 1940 =

United States investment law

The Investment Advisers Act of 1940, codified at 15 U.S.C. § 80b-1 through 15 U.S.C. § 80b-21, is a United States federal law that was created to monitor and regulate the activities of investment advisers (also spelled "advisors") as defined by the law. Passing unanimously in both the House and Senate, it is the primary source of regulation of investment advisers and is administered by the U.S. Securities and Exchange Commission.

== Overview ==
The law provides in part:

§ 80b–1. Findings

Upon the basis of facts disclosed by the record and report of the Securities and Exchange Commission made pursuant to section 79z–4 of this title, and facts otherwise disclosed and ascertained, it is found that investment advisers are of national concern, in that, among other things—

(1) their advice, counsel, publications, writings, analyses, and reports are furnished and distributed, and their contracts, subscription agreements, and other arrangements with clients are negotiated and performed, by the use of the mails and means and instrumentalities of interstate commerce;

(2) their advice, counsel, publications, writings, analyses, and reports customarily relate to the purchase and sale of securities traded on national securities exchanges and in interstate over-the-counter markets, securities issued by companies engaged in business in interstate commerce, and securities issued by national banks and member banks of the Federal Reserve System; and

(3) the foregoing transactions occur in such volume as substantially to affect interstate commerce, national securities exchanges, and other securities markets, the national banking system and the national economy.15 U.S.C. § 80b-1

== Contents ==
- Section 201 Findings
- Section 202(a) Definitions
- Section 202(b) Governments Excepted
- Section 203 Registration of Investment Advisers
- Section 203A State and Federal Responsibilities
- Section 204 Annual and Other Reports
- Section 204A Prevention of Misuse of Nonpublic Information
- Section 205 Investment Advisory Contracts
- Section 206 Prohibited Transactions by Investment Advisers
- Section 206A Exemptions
- Section 207 Material Misstatements
- Section 208 General Prohibitions
- Section 209 Enforcement of Title
- Section 210 Publicity
- Rules, Regulations and Orders (Section 211)
- Hearings (Section 212)
- Court Review of Orders (Section 213)
- Jurisdiction of Offenses and Suits (Section 214)
- Validity of Contracts (Section 215)
- Annual Reports of Commission (Section 216)
- Penalties (Section 217)
- Hiring and Leasing Authority of the commission (Section 218)
- Separability of Provisions (Section 219)
- Short Title (Section 220)
- Effective Date (Section 221)
- State Regulation of Investment Advisers (Section 222)

== Summary ==
The Investment Advisers Act (IAA) was passed in 1940 to monitor those who, for a fee, advise people, pension funds, and institutions on investment matters. Impetus for passage of the act began with the Public Utility Holding Company Act of 1935, which authorized the Securities and Exchange Commission (SEC) to study investment trusts. The thrust of the study, which led to the passage of the Investment Company Act of 1940 and the Investment Advisers Act, was to provide a closer look at investment trusts and investment companies. The study, however, found many instances of investment adviser abuse, such as unfounded "hot tips" and questionable performance fees.

The IAA sought less to regulate investment advisers than to keep track of who was in the industry and their methods of operation. The IAA does not mandate qualifications for becoming an investment adviser but requires registration for those using the mails to conduct investment counseling business.

The IAA mandated all persons and firms receiving compensation for serving as investment advisers to register with the SEC. The requirement has been revised on several occasions since then, most notably with the passage of the Dodd–Frank Wall Street Reform and Consumer Protection Act of 2010. There are, however, several exceptions and exemptions to the registration requirement: investment advisers whose clients all reside in the same state as the adviser's business office and who do not provide advice on securities listed on national exchanges; investment advisers whose clients are solely insurance companies; and certain investment advisers who manage solely private funds holding less than $100 million from US investors.

=== Investment advisers covered ===
A hallmark of the IAA is the required registration of virtually all investment advisers. Much verbiage, however, has gone into exactly what constitutes an investment adviser and corollary—investment advice. The act defines an investment adviser as "any person who, for compensation, engages in the business of advising others, either directly or through publications or writings, as to the value of securities or as to the advisability of investing in, purchasing, or selling securities, or who for compensation and as part of a regular business, issues or promulgates analyses or reports concerning securities." The SEC further refined its definition of an adviser in its Release 1092, which stated that the "giving of advice need not constitute the principal business activity or any particular portion of the business activities in order for a person to be an investment adviser." Release 1092 went on to state that the "giving of advice need only be done on such a basis that it constitutes a business activity occurring with some regularity. The frequency of the activity is a factor, but is not determinative."

Whether or not a person is considered to be an investment adviser under the IAA generally depends on three criteria: the type of advice offered, the method of compensation, and whether or not a significant portion of the "adviser's" income comes from proffering investment advice. Related to the last criterion is the consideration of whether or not a person leads others to believe that he or she is an investment adviser, such as by through advertising.

Under the Act, a person is generally considered to be an investment adviser by the offering of advice or the making of recommendations on securities as opposed to other types of investments. Securities may be defined under the act as including but not necessarily limited to notes, bonds, stocks (both common and preferred), mutual funds, money market funds, and certificates of deposit. The term "securities" does not generally include commodity contracts, real estate, insurance contracts, or collectibles such as works of art or rare stamps and coins. Even those who receive finder's fees for referring potential clients to investment advisers are considered to be investment advisers themselves.

Generally excluded from coverage under the act are those professionals whose investment advice to clients is incidental to the professional relationship. The IAA exempts "any lawyer, accountant, engineer, or teacher whose performance of such services is solely incidental to the practice of his profession." The key phrase is "solely incidental." An accountant, for instance, who acts as an investment adviser is in fact considered to be an investment adviser under the Act. If professionals are not to be considered investment advisers under the IAA, they must not present themselves to the public as investment advisers, any investment advice given must be reasonably related to their primary professional function, and fees for the "investment advice" must be based on the same criteria as fees for the primary professional function.

The IAA, however, excludes from its definition of an investment adviser "any broker or dealer whose performance of such [advisory] services is solely incidental to the conduct of his business as a broker or dealer and who receives no special compensation thereof." Banks, publishers, and government security advisers are also excepted from the Act. Those who call themselves "financial planners" may, under certain circumstances, be considered investment advisers under the Act. The difference between a financial planner and an investment adviser, as it relates to the IAA, is also addressed in the aforementioned Release 1092.

=== Registration ===
Under the Act, investment advisers must register using Form ADV accompanied by a relatively modest fee. Form ADV asks for such information as educational background, experience, exact type of business engaged in, assets, information on clients, history of a legal and/or criminal nature, and type of investment advice to be offered. Registration under the Act does not constitute an endorsement of the investment adviser, and the person or firm may not advertise as such. Part 2A and 2B of Form ADV forms the basis of the "brochure" that registered advisers must provide to clients. Part 3, also known as Form CRS, is a short relationship summary that also must be provided to clients.

Registered investment advisers are required to update their Form ADV at least annually. Advisers may receive compensation based on the performance of their advice only under prescribed circumstances, and they may not engage in excessive trading or profit from market activity resulting from their advice to clients. Investment advisers must also act in the best interest of their clients at all times and take into consideration their clients' financial positions and financial sophistication.

There are also many provisions in the Act dealing with fraud in terms of advertising, control of client assets, soliciting clients, and information disclosure.

== See also ==
- Securities regulation in the United States
- Commodity Futures Trading Commission
- Securities commission
- Chicago Stock Exchange
- Financial regulation
- NASDAQ
- New York Stock Exchange
- Stock exchange
- Regulation D (SEC)

Related legislation

- 1933 - Securities Act of 1933
- 1934 – Securities Exchange Act of 1934
- 1938 – Temporary National Economic Committee (establishment)
- 1939 - Trust Indenture Act of 1939
- 1940 - Investment Company Act of 1940
- 1968 – Williams Act (Securities Disclosure Act)
- 1975 – Securities Acts Amendments of 1975
- 1982 – Garn–St. Germain Depository Institutions Act
- 1999 – Gramm-Leach-Bliley Act
- 2000 – Commodity Futures Modernization Act of 2000
- 2002 – Sarbanes–Oxley Act
- 2006 - Credit Rating Agency Reform Act of 2006
- 2010 – Dodd–Frank Wall Street Reform and Consumer Protection Act
