= United States securities regulation =

Law and regulations that relate to Securities

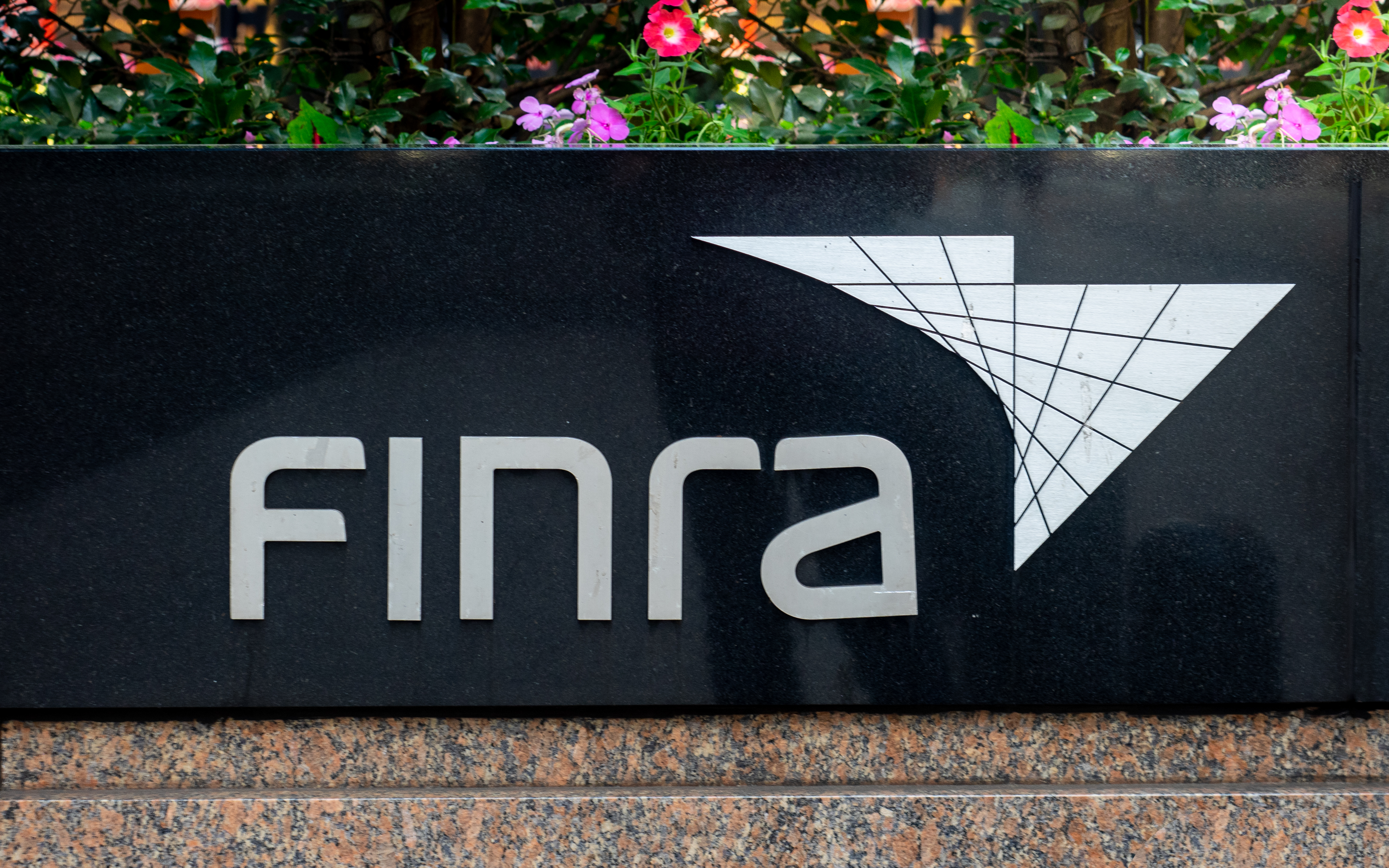
Financial Industry Regulatory Authority (FINRA) in New York

Securities regulation in the United States is the field of U.S. law that covers transactions and other dealings with securities. The term is usually understood to include both federal and state-level regulation by governmental regulatory agencies, but sometimes may also encompass listing requirements of exchanges like the New York Stock Exchange and rules of self-regulatory organizations like the Financial Industry Regulatory Authority (FINRA).

On the federal level, the primary securities regulator is the Securities and Exchange Commission (SEC). Futures and some aspects of derivatives are regulated by the Commodity Futures Trading Commission (CFTC). Understanding and complying with security regulation helps businesses avoid litigation with the SEC, state security commissioners, and private parties. Failing to comply can even result in criminal liability.

== Overview ==
The SEC was created by the Securities Exchange Act of 1934 to enforce the Securities Act of 1933. The SEC oversees several important organizations: for example, FINRA, a self-regulatory organization, is regulated by the SEC. FINRA promulgates rules that govern broker-dealers and certain other professionals in the securities industry. It was formed when the enforcement divisions of the National Association of Securities Dealers (NASD), FINRA, and the New York Stock Exchange merged into one organization. Similarly, the Securities Investor Protection Corporation (SIPC) is overseen by the SEC.

Seal of the U.S. Securities and Exchange Commission

All brokers and dealers registered with the SEC under 15 U.S.C. § 78o, with some exceptions, are required to be members of SIPC (pursuant to 15 U.S.C. § 78ccc) and are subject to its regulations.

The laws that govern the securities industry are:

1. Securities Act of 1933 – regulating distribution of new securities
2. Securities Exchange Act of 1934 – regulating trading securities, brokers, and exchanges (also creation of the SEC)
3. Trust Indenture Act of 1939 – regulating debt securities
4. Investment Company Act of 1940 – regulating mutual funds
5. Investment Advisers Act of 1940 – regulating investment advisers
6. Sarbanes-Oxley Act of 2002 – regulating corporate responsibility
7. Dodd-Frank Wall Street Reform and Consumer Protection Act of 2010 – regulating trade, credit rating, corporate governance, and corporate transparency
8. Jumpstart Our Business Startups Act of 2012 – regulating requirements for capital markets

The federal securities laws govern the offer and sale of securities and the trading of securities, activities of certain professionals in the industry, investment companies (such as mutual funds), tender offers, proxy statements, and generally the regulation of public companies. Public company regulation is largely a disclosure-driven regime, but it has grown in recent years to the point that it has begun to dictate certain issues of corporate governance.

State laws governing issuance and trading of securities are commonly referred to as blue sky laws and mostly deal with fraud and fraud investigation privileges, registration of securities, and registration of broker-dealers. In general, states allow injunctions to stop businesses from potentially fraudulent activity and states give broad investigative power, generally to the attorney general, to investigate fraudulent activity.

=== Securities Act of 1933 ===
The Securities Act of 1933 regulates the distribution of securities to public investors by creating registration and liability provisions to protect investors. With only a few exemptions, every security offering is required to be registered with the SEC by filing a registration statement that includes issuer history, business competition and material risks, litigation information, previous experience of officers/directors, compensation of employees, an in-depth securities description, and other relevant information. The price, amount, and selling method of securities must also be included in the registration statement. This statement is often written with the assistance of lawyers, accountants, and underwriters due to the complexity and large amount of information required for a valid registration statement. After a registration statement is successfully reviewed by the SEC, the prospectus selling document provides all the relevant information needed for investors and security purchasers to make an informed financial decision. This document will include both favorable and unfavorable information about a security issuer, which differs from the way securities were exchanged before the stock market crash. Section 5 of the 1933 Act describes three significant time periods of an offering, which includes the pre-filing period, the waiting period, and the post-effective period. If a person violates Section 5 in any way, Section 12(a)(1) imposes a liability that allows any purchaser of an illegal sale to get the remedy of rescinding the contract or compensation for damages. Criminal liability is determined by the United States attorney general, and intentional violation of the 1933 Act can result in five years in prison and a $10,000 fine.

=== Securities Exchange Act of 1934 ===
The Securities Exchange Act of 1934 is different from the 1933 Act because it requires periodic disclosure of information by the issuers to the shareholders and SEC in order to continue to protect investors once a company goes public. The public issuers of securities must report annually and quarterly to the SEC, but only annually to investors. Under this law, public issuers are required to register the particular class of securities. The registration statement for the 1934 Act is similar to the filing requirement of the 1933 Act only without the offering information. Another major reason for the implementation of the 1934 Act was to regulate insider securities transactions to prevent fraud and unfair manipulation of securities exchanges. In order to protect investors and maintain the integrity of securities exchanges, Section 16 of this law states that statutory insiders must disclose security ownership in their company 10 days prior and are required to report any following transactions within two days. A corporation officer with equity securities, a corporation director, or a person that owns 10% or more of equity securities is considered to be a statutory insider that is subject to the rules of Section 16. Anyone that intentionally falsifies or makes misleading statements in an official SEC document is subject to liability according to Section 18, and people relying on these false statements are able to sue for damages. The defendant must prove they acted in good faith and was unaware of any misleading information. Rule 10b-5 allows people to sue fraudulent individuals directly responsible for an omission of important facts or intentional misstatements. The SEC does not have the authority to issue injunctions, but it does have the authority to issue cease and desist orders and fines up to $500,000. Injunctions and ancillary relief are achieved through federal district courts, and these courts are often notified by the SEC.

== History ==
Securities regulation came about after the stock market crash that occurred in October 1929. Before the Wall Street Crash of 1929, there was little regulation of securities in the United States at the state and federal level. An economic depression followed the Wall Street Crash of 1929, which motivated President Franklin Roosevelt to create laws regulating securities transactions during his famous "first 100 Day” period of his New Deal. Congress discovered that the stock market crash was largely due to problems with securities transactions, including the lack of relevant information about securities given to investors and the absurd claims made by the sellers of securities in companies that did not even exist yet. This lack of information lead to a disclosure scheme that requires sellers of securities to disclose pertinent information about the company to investors so that they are able to make wise financial decisions. The crash spurred Congress to hold hearings, known as the Pecora Commission, after Ferdinand Pecora.

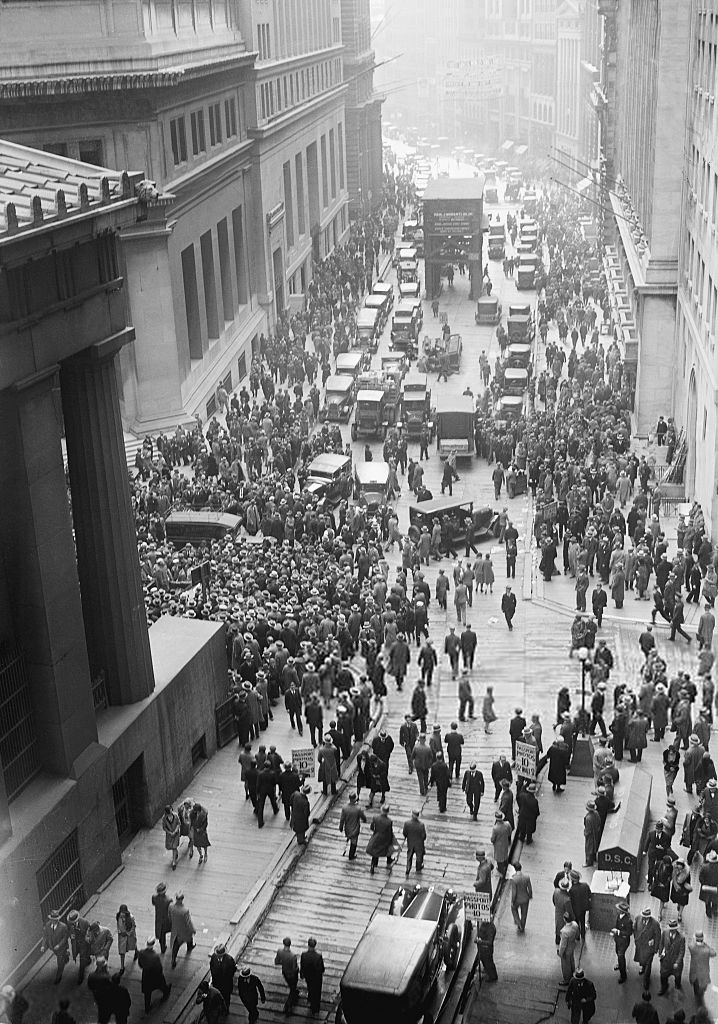
Crowds outside New York Stock Exchange after Wall Street Crash of 1929

Prior to the Securities Act of 1933, securities were mainly regulated by state laws, which are also known as blue sky laws. After the Pecora hearings, Congress passed the Securities Act of 1933 prescribing rules for the interstate sales of securities, and made it illegal to sell securities in a state without complying with that state's laws. This statute broadly defines a security as “any note, stock, treasury stock, security future, security-based swap, bond, debenture, evidence of indebtedness, certificate of interest, or participation in any profit-sharing agreement.” In simpler terms, a security is a medium of investment that creates a certain level of financial obligation. The statute requires a publicly traded company to register with the U.S. Securities and Exchange Commission (SEC). The registration statement provides a broad range of information about the company and is a public record. The SEC does not approve or disapprove the issue of securities, but rather permits the filing statement to "become effective" if sufficient required detail is provided, including risk factors. The main objective of the act was to eliminate information gaps with two methods: first, companies were required to give investors financial and other pertinent information about the securities offered, and second, Congress disallowed fraudulent information and other misinformation in the sale of securities. The company can then begin selling the stock issue, usually through investment bankers.

The following year, Congress passed the Securities Exchange Act of 1934, to regulate the secondary market (general-public) trading of securities. Initially, the 1934 Act applied only to stock exchanges and their listed companies, as the name implies. In the late 1930s, it was amended to provide regulation of the over-the-counter (OTC) market (i.e., trades between individuals with no stock exchange involved). In 1964, the Act was amended to apply to companies traded in the OTC market. Overall, these first two statutes served to regulate the exchange of securities, require the disclosure of information, and inflict consequences on individuals that do not disclose information properly, whether it be intentional or erroneous. These laws were the first of many to rebuild investor confidence and protection.

The government continues to reform security regulation. In October 2000, the SEC issued the Regulation Fair Disclosure (Reg FD), which required publicly traded companies to disclose material information to all investors at the same time. Reg FD helped level the playing field for all investors by helping to reduce the problem of selective disclosure. In 2010, the Dodd–Frank Wall Street Reform and Consumer Protection Act was passed to reform securities law in the wake of the 2008 financial crisis. The most recent regulation came in the form of the Jumpstart Our Business Startups Act of 2012 which worked to deregulate capital markets to reduce cost of capital for companies.

Over the years the courts formed United States securities case law. Some notable decisions include the 1988 decision by the Supreme Court of the United States in Basic Inc. v. Levinson, which allowed class action lawsuits under SEC Rule 10b-5 and the "fraud-on-the-market" theory, which resulted in an increase in securities class actions. The Private Securities Litigation Reform Act and the state model law Securities Litigation Uniform Standards Act was a response to class actions.

== Naming practices ==
Congress has amended securities acts many times. The Holding Company Act and the Trust Indenture Act in particular have changed significantly since they originally passed. The titles of securities acts, including the year of original enactment, are the so-called "popular names" of these laws, and practitioners in this area reference these statutes using these popular names (e.g., "Section 10(b) of the Exchange Act" or "Section 5 of the Securities Act"). When they do so, they do not generally mean the provisions of the original Acts; they mean the Acts as amended to date. When Congress amends the securities laws, those amendments have their own popular names (a few prominent examples include Securities Investor Protection Act of 1970, the Insider Trading Sanctions Act of 1984, the Insider Trading and Securities Fraud Enforcement Act of 1988 and the Dodd-Frank Act). These acts often include provisions that state that they are amending one of the primary laws. Other laws passed since then include Private Securities Litigation Reform Act (1995), Sarbanes–Oxley Act (2002), Jumpstart Our Business Startups Act (2012), and various other federal securities laws.

Although practitioners use popular names to refer to federal securities laws, these laws are generally codified in the U.S. Code, which is the official codification of U.S. statutory law. They are contained in Title 15 of the U.S. Code: for example, the official code citation for Section 5 of the Securities Act of 1933 is 15 U.S.C. section 77e. Not every law adopted by Congress is codified because some are not appropriate for codification: for example, appropriations statutes are not codified. There are also extensive regulations under these laws, largely made by the SEC. One of the most famous and often used SEC rules is Rule 10b-5, which prohibits fraud in securities transactions as well as insider trading. Interpretations under rule 10b-5 often deem silence to be fraudulent in certain circumstances. Efforts to comply with Rule 10b-5 and avoid lawsuits under 10b-5 have been responsible for a large amount of corporate disclosure. Due to the frequent use of the 10b-5 rule, codification becomes both efficient and necessary.

== Howey Test ==
The Securities Act of 1933 has a broad definition for "securities" including notes, bonds, security futures, treasury stock, certification of interest, and much more. The United States Supreme Court heard several cases to define exactly what encompassed a "security". The Supreme Court has used the Howey test to define what securities are since its decision in the 1946 SEC v. W. J. Howey Co. case. The Howey test defines securities as investment contracts that involve investment of money or property, in a common enterprise, with profits coming from the sole efforts of people other than the investor. With that definition there are several exemptions, both in types of securities that are regulated and transactions that are regulated. This is a significant test because it determines whether or not certain transactions qualify for SEC registration and adherence to disclosure rules. In 1946, the Supreme Court determined three parts to this test that qualifies a transaction as an investment contract:

1. There is an investment of money or assets

2. The investment is in a common enterprise

3. There is a reasonable expectation of profits (or assets) and reasonable reliance on the efforts of others

=== Horizontal vs. Vertical Commonality ===
There are two ways to define the common enterprise aspect of this test, which include horizontal and vertical commonality. Horizontal commonality is when investors combine funds and share profits proportionally. All courts allow horizontal commonality, but only some courts will allow vertical commonality for the common enterprise requirement. Vertical commonality refers to the investors and the promoter of the investments, and it evaluates the similarity of how each person is affected.

== Registration Exemptions ==
Since the 1933 Act registration requirements can be very complex, costly, and take a lot of time to complete, many people look for alternative ways to sell securities. There are securities exemptions and transaction exemptions that do not require registration with the SEC, but the issuers of these security transactions are still liable for any fraud that may occur. Securities exemptions include insurance policies, annuity contracts, bank securities, United States government issued securities, notes/drafts with a maturity date less than nine months after the issue date, and securities offered by nonprofit (religious, charitable, etc.) organizations. Transaction exemptions include intrastate offerings (Rule 147), private offerings (Rule 506, Regulation D), small offerings (Regulation A; Rules 504 & 505), and resale of restricted securities (Rule 144).

=== Security exemptions ===
Under the Securities Act of 1933 there are several securities that are exempt from registration. The most important of which are listed below:

1. Annuity contract or insurance policy
2. Securities issued by nonprofits, religious, educational, or charitable organizations
3. Securities issued by a savings and loan association or bank
4. Securities issued or guaranteed by a municipality, or any government entity in the United States
5. Certain short term notes, generally less than nine months

A full list of exemptions can be found in sections 3(a)(2)-3(a)(8), 15 U.S.C. §§ 77c(a)(2)-(a)(8) of the Securities Act of 1933.

=== Transaction exemptions ===
Initial Public Offerings (IPO) can become very costly. According to PWC costs for companies with revenue under $100 million can range from $2.6 million to $70.8 million depending on the valuation of the deal. These costs are mainly from the 11th section of the Securities Act of 1933 requiring due diligence for companies going public. The following exemptions were made in order to foster capital by lowering cost of offerings for small companies.

==== Regulation A ====
Regulation A	Tier 1	Tier 2
One Year offering Limit	$20 Million	$50 Million
Number and Type of Investors	No Limit	Non-accredited investors may have limits on investment
Solicitation Requirements	Allowed	
Filing Requirements	Form 1-A; two years of financial statements; exit report	Form 1-A; two years of audited financial statements; annual, semi-annual, current, and exit reports
Resale Restrictions	None	

==== Section 4(a)(2) ====
Section 4(a)(2)
One Year offering Limit	No limit
Number and Type of Investors	Investors must be "Sophisticated" according to court decision in SEC v. Ralston Purina Co
Solicitation Requirements	Disallowed
Filing Requirements	No
Resale Restrictions	Restricted Securities

==== Regulation D ====
Regulation D	Rule 504	Rule 506(b)	Rule 506(c)
One Year offering Limit	$10 Million	Unlimited	
Number and Type of Investors	No limit	No limit on accredited investors, but no more than 35 non-accredited but sophisticated investors	No limit on accredited investors, but issuer must take reasonable steps to ensure accreditation
Solicitation Requirements	Limited	Disallowed	Allowed
Filing Requirements	Form D	Form D with additional information required for non-accredited investors	Form D
Resale Restrictions	Restricted securities in most cases	Restricted securities	

==== Crowdfunding ====
Crowdfunding
One Year offering Limit	$1.07 Million
Number and Type of Investors	Limitations depending on annual income and net worth
Solicitation Requirements	Limited and must be through internet
Filing Requirements	Form C; two years of certified, reviewed, or audited financial statements; Annual and progress reports
Resale Restrictions	Resale must be after one year

==== Intrastate Offerings ====
Intrastate offerings are when securities are only offered to investors that live in the state where the business resides. This type of transaction qualifies for the SEC registration exemption on a federal level. However, state securities laws (blue sky laws) still have to be followed. Rule 147 specifies that 80% or more of the issuer’s revenue and assets must remain in the specified state, as well as 80% of the proceeds from the intrastate offerings must be used in the same state.

Intrastate	Section 3(a)(11)	Rule 147	Rule 147A
One Year offering Limit	No limit		
Number and Type of Investors	Must be in-state resident		
Solicitation Requirements	Issuer must be in-state residence		Allowed
Filing Requirements	No		
Resale Restrictions	Must end with in-state residents	Resale must be within six months within the state	

==== Private Offerings ====
A private offering is not open to the public, but rather only available to a small group of purchasers that are able to safely invest due to their large amount of wealth or extensive knowledge about investments. Rule 506 in Regulation D of the Securities Act states that the issuer must reasonably determine if the investors qualify by being accredited or experienced in financial investment matters, and the investors should sign a suitability letter. Although these transactions are exempt from SEC registration, issuers still must provide investors with substantial information that allows them to make an informed decision. Rule 506 also restricts the issuer from offering securities publicly and requires the issuer to try and make resale of securities remain private.

==== Small Offerings ====
Rule 505 of Regulation D also allows for shorter disclosure forms when small offerings are made of no more than $5 million in a period of one year. However, the issuer cannot have a history of securities fraud or related crimes. Rule 505 does not allow general selling efforts and requires disclosure similar to Rule 506, but purchasers do not have to be experienced with investments. Rule 504 exempts SEC registration of a nonpublic issuer of $1 million or less in securities within a period of one year as long as the issuer discloses the relevant information required by state law. Rule 504 also allows general selling efforts, has no limit on how many purchasers, and purchasers do not need specific qualifications. Regulation A provides an exemption to SEC registration of small market offerings of $5 million or less, and there is less of a disclosure requirement. The disclosure statement is called an offering circular, which contains a balance sheet from at most 90 days before the file date, two years of income statements, cash flow information, and shareholder equity reports. Regulation A does not specify purchaser number, sophistication, or resale requirements. In some cases, the SEC will exempt offerings of $50 million or less since the amendment created by the JOBS Act.

==== Resale of Restricted Securities ====
Securities in accordance with Rules 504, 505, and 506 (Regulation D) are considered restricted securities. These restricted securities are often acquired by investors through unregistered or private offerings, meaning the securities cannot be resold for a period of time unless registered with the SEC or it qualifies for an exemption. Rule 144 provides an exemption to this rule and allows purchasers of restricted securities to resell under certain circumstances. There is a holding period that must be met in order for anyone to sell restricted securities. If the issuer of the security is a public company that reports to the SEC, then the purchaser must hold the security for a minimum of six months. If the issuer does not report to the SEC, then the purchaser must hold the securities for a minimum of one year. Another requirement is that there must be current public information readily available about the company that issued the securities before the sale can happen. Affiliated investors must follow a trading volume formula and carry out routine brokerage transactions in accordance to the SEC. Investors that are unaffiliated to the issuer company can sell all or a portion of the restricted securities after complying with the holding time. An affiliated investor can only sell a limited number of restricted securities and has to comply with more complicated requirements. Affiliated resellers of restricted securities are required to file Form 144 with the SEC.

== No-action letter ==
The no-action letter is a tool to reduce risk and ensure the SEC will not take action in a given situation. Prior to a transaction an individual can apply for a no-action letter with the SEC outlining exactly what the individual plans to do. The SEC can then grant the request by sending a letter promising to take no legal action if the individual acts as indicated in the letter. This letter is not binding to state commissioners, but commissioners generally follow the Federal precedent set by the SEC. Often no-action letters are acquired before performing a transaction or security exemption.

== See also ==
- Financial regulation
- Securities commission
- Securities market participants (United States)
