= SEC v. Texas Gulf Sulphur Co. =

American legal case

- Court: United States Court of Appeals for the Second Circuit
- Argued: March 20, 1967
- Decided: August 13, 1968
- Citation: 401 F.2d 833; 2 A.L.R. Fed. 190

Case history
- Prior history: SEC v. Texas Gulf Sulphur Co., 258 F.Supp. 262 (S.D.N.Y. 1966)
- Subsequent history: Coates v. SEC, 394 U.S. 976 (1969) (denying certiorari); Kline v. SEC, 394 U.S. 976 (1969) (denying certiorari)

Case opinions
- Majority: Waterman
- Concurrence: Friendly
- Concurrence: Kaufman
- Concurrence: Anderson
- Concur/dissent: Hays
- Dissent: Moore, joined by Lumbard

Laws applied
- Section 10(b) of Securities Exchange Act; SEC Rule 10b-5

SEC v. Texas Gulf Sulphur Co. is a case from the United States Court of Appeals for the Second Circuit which articulated standards for a number of aspects of insider trading law under Section 10(b) of the Securities Exchange Act and SEC Rule 10b-5. In particular, it set out standards for materiality of inside information, effective disclosure of such information, and what constitutes a "misleading" statement. Texas Gulf Sulphur represented the first time a federal court held that insider trading violated federal securities law and remained the leading case on insider trading for a decade. Over time, the U.S. Supreme Court embraced some of its holdings while rejecting others. The case continues to receive significant scholarly attention.

== Facts and procedural history ==
The dispute centered on the actions of a dozen employees of the Texas Gulf Sulphur Co. (TGS) following the discovery of major mineral deposits in Canada. After TGS conducted exploratory drilling and found evidence of significant deposits, it decided to acquire surrounding land. TGS' president instructed the exploration group not to share the information with others. During this time, several TGS employees and outsiders who had received tips from them purchased TGS stock. In addition, a group of employees accepted stock options from TGS without informing the Board of the finds.

After newspapers reported TGS had uncovered significant mineral deposits, the company released a statement disclaiming the reports. Several days later, at 10:00 a.m., TGS read a statement to the press confirming a major find, and the news was reported on the Dow Jones ticker tape at 10:54 a.m. Several TGS employees had bought company stock before the announcement, and one placed an order after the announcement but before the Dow Jones report.

The U.S. Securities and Exchange Commission (SEC) brought claims against twelve TGS employees as well as the company itself for violating section 10(b) of the Securities Exchange Act and SEC Rule 10b-5. The suit alleged the employees had, variously: bought TGS stock on the basis of material nonpublic information; divulged nonpublic information to outsiders; or accepted stock options without disclosing material information to the Board. The SEC also sued the company itself on the grounds that its first statement was deceptive.

A federal district court concluded that information about the exploration only became material several days before the company's first statement, and therefore only inside activity after that point and before the company fully disclosed its findings were unlawful. In addition, the court held that the press release was not unlawful.

== Opinion of the Court ==
Judge Waterman wrote the majority opinion, which included holdings on a number of legal issues related to insider trading and false or misleading statements.

=== Insider trading ===
==== "Disclose or Abstain" ====
The court endorsed a "disclose or abstain" rule for insider trading which required anyone with material inside information about a company to either disclose it to the public or abstain from trading in the company's stock. Notably, this obligation under Rule 10b-5 applied to anyone possessing such information, including people that "may not be strictly termed an 'insider.'"

==== Materiality ====
The court then addressed what qualifies as "material" inside information, the threshold for the duty to disclose or abstain. It held that only information about situations which, if disclosed, would have a substantial effect on stock price was material. Further, whether information about an event is material depends on the probability the event will occur balanced with the magnitude of the event. In the case of TGS, information about the initial finds was material despite being "remote", since knowing such a vast mine might have been found could have affected TGS's stock price. Therefore, the court concluded that all trading by people who knew about the initial finds violated Rule 10b-5, setting the point at which the information became material earlier than the district court.

==== Tipper and tippee liability ====
On the issue of tipper-tippee liability, the court held that by sharing material information with corporate outsiders who then bought TGS stock, an employee violated Rule 10b-5. While not deciding whether those outsiders (the "tippees") would equally have violated the rule if they had known the information was not disclosed, the court remarked that their conduct "certainly could be equally reprehensible."

==== Effective disclosure ====
The court stated that, before insiders can trade on material information, the information had to have been effectively disclosed in a way that insured it was available to investors. Even though word of an article reporting a significant find by TGS had reached New York before the company read its statement to the press, these early reports were deemed insufficient. In addition, the court held that reading a news release is only the first step in disseminating information. Therefore, a TGS employee who traded after the statement was read but before Dow Jones reported the news should have waited until it appeared on "the media of widest circulation", the Dow Jones ticker.

==== Good faith defense ====
Employees who traded before Dow Jones reported the news but claimed they honestly believed the news had become public raised a "good faith" defense. The court rejected this argument, holding that specific intent to defraud is not necessary to establish 10b-5 liability; a defendant's negligence suffices. In this case, because the TGS employees' beliefs that the news was public were not reasonable, they had acted negligently and were liable.

==== Accepting stock options ====
As to receiving stock options from TGS, the court held that members of top management had a duty to disclose any material information before doing so. Therefore, an employee who failed to do so violated Rule 10b-5.

=== Misleading statements ===
==== "In connection with" ====
TGS argued that its first public statement was not unlawful because it was not issued "in connection with the purchase or sale of any security", as required by Rule 10b-5. Specifically, the statement had not produced any unusual market activity, nor had TGS made the statement intending to affect the company's stock price for internal benefit. The court rejected these arguments and held that the "in connection with" prong only requires a false or misleading statement be made "in a manner reasonably calculated to influence [investors]." TGS's statement met this standard. However, the court endorsed a good faith defense, which it had rejected for insider trading. Specifically, if corporate management could show it disseminated information in good faith after diligently determining it was "the whole truth", there would be no 10b-5 violation.

==== "Misleading" ====
The court held that the test for determining if a statement was misleading under 10b-5 is whether a reasonable investor would have been misled. Because the district court had applied the wrong standard (whether the drafters had exercised reasonable business judgment), the court remanded without deciding if the first statement was misleading.

== Concurring opinion by Judge Friendly ==
Judge Friendly wrote a separate concurring opinion expressing his concern about the possibility of private suits for large money damages based only on negligently prepared press releases. In his view, a merely negligent violation of Rule 10b-5 (such as TGS's release of its first statement) would not necessarily establish a private claim for damages.

== Concurring opinions by Judges Kaufman, Anderson, and Hays ==
Judge Kaufman wrote a concurring opinion, joining the majority as well as Judge Friendly's call to provide more guidance on private damages claims. Judge Anderson concurred in the majority opinion and elements of Judge Friendly's discussion of private claims. Judge Hays filed an opinion concurring with most of the majority opinion, but dissenting as to the proper remedies for certain violations.

== Dissenting opinion by Judge Moore ==
Judge Moore, joined by Chief Judge Lumbard, dissented from the majority opinion and drew fault with almost every element of it. Judge Moore objected to the majority's standard for materiality, arguing that relying on the potential impact that information might have on stock price would sweep in almost any fact related to a company. On the question of stock options, the dissent would have held that it is acceptable for top managers who have undisclosed information to accept options, as long as the managers did not exercise them before the information became public. Judge Moore further objected to the majority's "reasonable investor" standard for judging misleading statements and would have instead deferred to management's business judgment. As to the proper meaning of "in connection with", the dissent called for a requirement that the defendant either have acted with a fraudulent purpose or have made trades. In Judge Moore's view, the majority's standard would bring all public corporate statements within the scope of 10b-5. Most fundamentally, he objected to the "unrealistic approach" the majority took to corporate press releases, which he believed set an overly exacting standard and subjected corporations to judicial second guessing.

== Philosophy behind the opinion ==
The majority drew heavily on what it viewed as the core policy behind Rule 10b-5, that "all investors trading on impersonal exchanges [should] have relatively equal access to material information." The court stated that the inequities of an unlevel playing field should not be "shrugged off as inevitable in our way of life" nor remain uncorrected.

As a matter of judicial interpretation, Texas Gulf Sulphur construed federal securities laws to realize Congress's "broad remedial design", and interpreted section 10(b) as a "catchall." Justice Rehnquist later criticized this approach in Blue Chip Stamps v. Manor Drug Stores, where he famously criticized securities law developments as "a judicial oak which has grown from little more than a legislative acorn."

== Relevance ==
=== Importance at the time ===
The Texas Gulf Sulphur decision represented the first time a federal court held that insider trading violated federal securities laws. The SEC in Cady, Roberts & Co. (1961) had extensively treated insider trading and set out the "disclose or abstain rule", but as an agency opinion, it did not have precedential value in federal courts. After the Second Circuit issued its opinion, the Supreme Court declined review. Absent controlling Supreme Court rulings on the issues, Texas Gulf Sulphur became the "pre-eminent insider trading rule" for the next decade.

=== Later treatment of Texas Gulf Sulphur by courts ===
Over the years, the Supreme Court addressed many of the Second Circuit's holdings, rejecting some and adopting others. In Chiarella v. United States (1980), the Court rejected the rule that anyone with material inside information must disclose or abstain from trading. Instead, the Court held that a fiduciary or similar relationship between the parties to a transaction was needed for this duty to apply. While Texas Gulf Sulphur held that material information included facts which "in reasonable and objective contemplation might" affect a company's stock price, the Supreme Court in TSC Industries, Inc. v. Northway, Inc. (1976) set the standard at whether "a reasonable shareholder would consider it important." Rejecting Texas Gulf Sulphur's negligence standard for 10b-5 violations, the Court required "scienter" be shown. On the other hand, the Supreme Court followed Texas Gulf Sulphur in broadly construing the "in construction with" element. In addition, the Court endorsed Texas Gulf Sulphur's "probability-magnitude test" as a factor for determining materiality in Basic, Inc. v. Levinson (1988).

=== Continued relevance ===
Texas Gulf Sulphur has been called "perhaps the most important federal case under the U.S. securities law." Certain of its holdings remain good law today. In addition, the "price impact" test the court used to determine materiality has been adopted in jurisdictions outside the U.S.
