= Securities Litigation Uniform Standards Act =

Securities Litigation Uniform Standards Act of 1998
- Long title: An Act to amend the Securities Act of 1933 and the Securities Exchange Act of 1934 to limit the conduct of securities class actions under State law, and for other purposes.
- Enacted by: the 105th United States Congress

Citations
- Public law: Pub. L. 105-353
- Statutes at Large: 112 Stat. 3227

Legislative history
- Introduced in the Senate as S. 1260 by Phil Gramm on October 7, 1997; Signed into law by President Bill Clinton on November 3, 1998

The Securities Litigation Uniform Standards Act of 1998 (SLUSA), Pub. L. 105–353 (text) (PDF), 112 Stat. 3227, is a federal legislative act in the United States regarding private class action lawsuits for securities fraud. SLUSA amended portions of the Securities Act of 1933 and the Securities Exchange Act of 1934 to preempt certain class actions that alleged fraud under state law "in connection with the purchase or sale" of securities. Such lawsuits cannot be filed in state or federal court.

== Background ==
In 1995, Congress passed the Private Securities Litigation Reform Act (PSLRA), claiming that the class action device was being used to injure "the entire U.S. economy" through nuisance filings, targeting of deep-pocket defendants, vexatious discovery requests, and "manipulation by class action lawyers of the clients whom they purportedly represent." The PSLRA accordingly imposed new restrictions that included a heightened pleading standard for securities class actions, damage caps, and mandatory sanctions for frivolous litigation.

The consequence was that many securities fraud plaintiffs sought to escape the new strictures under the PSLRA by avoiding federal court altogether. While historically securities cases were rare in state court, state law-based class actions for securities fraud now became common. Congress conducted a hearing in 1997 to evaluate these effects of the PSLRA, and subsequently enacted SLUSA to stem this "shift from Federal to State courts" and "prevent certain State private securities class action lawsuits alleging fraud from being used to frustrate the objectives of" the Reform Act.

== Provisions ==
The core provision of SLUSA reads as follows:

CLASS ACTION LIMITATIONS. -- No covered class action based upon the statutory or common law of any State or subdivision thereof may be maintained in any State or Federal court by any private party alleging --

(A) a misrepresentation or omission of a material fact in connection with the purchase or sale of a covered security; or

(B) that the defendant used or employed any manipulative or deceptive device or contrivance in connection with the purchase or sale of a covered security.

Another key provision of the statute makes all "covered class actions" filed in state court removable to federal court, which it defines as a lawsuit in which damages are sought on behalf of more than 50 people. A "covered security" is one traded nationally and listed on a regulated national stock exchange.

== Scope of preemption ==
In Merrill Lynch, Pierce, Fenner & Smith, Inc. v. Dabit, 547 U.S. 71 (2006), the U.S. Supreme Court ruled that SLUSA operated to preempt state law "holder" claims, which alleged injury based on the prolonged retention of stock due to fraud, as well as claims arising from the fraud-induced purchase or sale of securities. Though SEC Rule 10b-5 only establishes a private cause of action under federal law for purchaser-seller claims, and that rule uses the same "in connection with" language as SLUSA, the Court ruled that the exclusion of holder claims from Rule 10b-5 was a judicially crafted limitation on private litigation, not an interpretation of its language. The Court believed that the policy behind SLUSA indicated that its language should be given broad effect, to close the holder claim loophole.

== Exemptions ==
SLUSA exempts from its preemption coverage certain class actions that are based on the law of the state in which the issuer of the security is incorporated. It also excludes any actions brought by a state agency, a state pension plan, actions under contracts between issuers and indenture trustees, and derivative actions brought by shareholders on behalf of a corporation. SLUSA also expressly preserves state court jurisdiction over state agency enforcement proceedings.

== See also ==
- In re American Realty Capital Properties, Inc. Litigation, regarding alleged violations of Section 11 of the Securities Act of 1933.
