= SEC Rule 10b5-1 =

Regulation of United States Securities and Exchange Commission

SEC Rule 10b5-1, codified at 17 CFR 240.10b5-1, is a regulation enacted by the United States Securities and Exchange Commission (SEC) in 2000. The SEC states that Rule 10b5-1 was enacted in order to resolve an unsettled issue over the definition of insider trading, which is prohibited by SEC Rule 10b-5.

Different courts of appeals had come to different conclusions about what constituted insider trading under Rule 10b-5 — specifically, whether someone could be held liable for insider trading simply by trading while in possession of inside information, or whether a trier of fact must find that the person actually used that inside information when making the trade.

== "Possession" versus "use" ==
Paragraph (a) of the Rule essentially repeats the holding of the United States Supreme Court in United States v. O'Hagan, 521 U.S. 642 (1997), which defines insider trading under the misappropriation theory. It states, in full, that

The "manipulative and deceptive devices" prohibited by Section 10(b) of the Act and Rule 10b-5 thereunder include, among other things, the purchase or sale of a security of any issuer, on the basis of material nonpublic information about that security or issuer, in breach of a duty of trust or confidence that is owed directly, indirectly, or derivatively, to the issuer of that security or the shareholders of that issuer, or to any other person who is the source of the material nonpublic information.

Paragraph (b) addresses the unsettled "possession" versus "use" issue, stating that a person violates Rule 10b-5 simply by trading while in "possession" of inside information. It states in full, that

Subject to the affirmative defenses in paragraph (c) of this section, a purchase or sale of a security of an issuer is "on the basis of" material nonpublic information about that security or issuer if the person making the purchase or sale was aware of the material nonpublic information when the person made the purchase or sale.

In other words, under 10b5-1(b) a person could be liable for insider trading simply by possessing inside information regarding a given security, breaching a fiduciary duty to the source of the information, and then trading it with a self-serving intent, even if the trade would have been made anyway. See ''United States v. O'Hagan, 521 U.S. 642, 652 (1997). But it is unlikely the SEC will detect or particularly care about a small trade that would have occurred anyway. A large trade or series of trades that reap unusual benefits for a trader, however, will likely be detected, and it would be difficult to prove that the material non-public information did not contribute to the decision to make the trade.

== Affirmative legal defense for planned trades ==
In paragraph (c), however, the SEC created an affirmative defense to a charge of insider trading, "designed to cover situations in which a person can demonstrate that the material nonpublic information was not a factor in the trading decision." The provision allows an affirmative defense to insider trading when the trade was made pursuant to a contract, instructions given to another, or a written plan that "[d]id not permit the person to exercise any subsequent influence over how, when, or whether to effect purchases or sales" (10b5-1(c)(1)(i)(B)(3)), and the plan (or contract or instructions) was created before the person had inside information.

For example, a CEO of a company could call a broker on January 1 and enter into a plan to sell a particular quantity of shares of his company's stock on March 1, find out terrible news about his company on February 1 that would not become public until April 1, and then go forward with the March 1 sale anyway, saving himself from losing money when the bad news becomes public. Under the terms of Rule 10b5-1(b) this would be insider trading because the CEO "was aware" of the inside information when he made the trade. But he could assert an affirmative defense under Rule 10b5-1(c), because he had planned the trade before he learned the inside information.

== First-ever indictment and conviction for insider trading based on use of a Rule 10b5-1 plan ==
In March 2023, in the first-ever indictment for insider trading based on an executive's use of a Rule 10b5-1 plan, the Department of Justice charged Terren Peizer with one count of engaging in a securities fraud scheme and two counts of securities fraud for insider trading. The SEC alleged that Peizer, the chairman and CEO of Ontrak Inc., sold $20 million of Ontrak stock while he was in possession of material nonpublic negative information related to the company’s largest customer. Ontrak shares, which had traded at $85.21 in February 2021, had fallen to under $1.00 by July 2022.

The U.S. Department of Justice also announced criminal charges of securities fraud against Peizer, charging that he had thereby avoided $12 million in losses, and he was arrested. On January 31, 2024, a superseding indictment was filed, charging Peizer with additional counts of securities fraud and insider trading. The case was heard in the U.S. District Court for the Central District of California before U.S. District Judge Dale S. Fischer. Peizer was convicted after a nine-day trial on June 21, 2024, and could face up to 65 years in prison.

== A possible loophole: canceling plans ==
After Rule 10b5-1 was enacted, the SEC staff publicly took the position that canceling a planned trade made under the safe harbor does not constitute insider trading, even if the person was aware of the inside information when canceling the trade. The SEC stated that, despite the fact that 10b5-1(c) requires trades to be irrevocable, there can be no liability for insider trading under Rule 10b-5 without an actual securities transaction, based on the U.S. Supreme Court's holding in Blue Chip Stamps v. Manor Drug Stores, 421 U.S. 723 (1975).

This staff interpretation raises the possibility that executives can exploit the safe harbor provision by entering into 10b5-1 trading plans before they have inside information, while retaining the option later to cancel those plans based on inside information. Although paragraph (c)(1)(i)(C) does deny the affirmative defense to offsetting or hedged transactions, in that case there would still be an actual trade (whichever of the offsetting trades was not canceled) that could constitute insider trading and violate Rule 10b-5. The SEC's position is that there can be no insider trading without a trade, so a person can cancel a planned trade based on inside information and avoid liability. Although technically any plan that is cancelable does not come under the 10b5-1 safe harbor, proving that an executed trade was hypothetically cancelable might be very difficult.

A few academic commentators have written about this issue, arguing that insiders can make systematically above-market profits by using 10b5-1 plans that they are still able to cancel. One empirical study has found that insiders using 10b5-1 plans do in fact make above-market profits (though the paper also alludes to other potential loopholes that might explain this result), and another has found that the presence of publicly announced 10b5-1 plans has economic effects on securities markets that are generally associated with insider trading. Others contend that rather than timing trades, executives may time news or press releases to move the stock before a 10b5-1 plan sale.

== SEC reaction ==
Linda Chatman Thomsen, then the SEC chief enforcement officer, noted in a speech that the SEC was investigating why 10b5-1 trades appear to outperform the market. Allegations of improper 10b5-1 trades were referred to during the insider trading trial of Joseph Nacchio, former Qwest CEO. There are also preliminary investigations into 10b5-1 trades by Angelo Mozilo from Countrywide Financial. The SEC sent a Wells Notice to Mozilo in May 2009, suggesting its intent to pursue civil charges in relation to alleged illegal trades through his 10b5-1 plan.

On March 25, 2009, the SEC staff revised its interpretative guidance regarding the circumstances under which the affirmative defense in Rule 10b5-1(c) is available. In particular, the staff followed the approach previously urged by some commentators to clarify (1) that the cancellation of a 10b5-1 plan could call the good faith of other, executed plans into doubt and (2) that the Supreme Court's decision in Blue Chip Stamps v. Manor Drug Stores, 421 U.S. 723 (1975), did not affect the SEC's ability to bring an enforcement action against a would-be insider trader who canceled a trading plan and did not trade in a particular transaction because a subsequent decision, Merrill Lynch, Pierce, Fenner & Smith, Inc., v. Dabit, 547 U.S. 71 (2006), made clear that Blue Chip Stamps dealt only with the implied private right of action for violations of Rule 10b-5 and not the "in connection with" requirement for all Rule 10b-5 violations.

Beginning April 1, the SEC will require a minimum 90-day cooling-off period for most executive trading plans.
