= Merrill Lynch, Pierce, Fenner & Smith, Inc. v. Dabit =

- Supreme Court of the United States

Argued January 18, 2006 Decided March 21, 2006
- Full case name: Merrill Lynch, Pierce, Fenner & Smith, Incorporated, Petitioner v. Shadi Dabit
- Docket no.: 04-1371
- Citations: 547 U.S. 71 (more) 126 S. Ct. 1503; 164 L. Ed. 2d 179; 2006 U.S. LEXIS 2497; 74 U.S.L.W. 4167

Case history
- Prior: Dismissed with leave to amend, W.D. Okla.; dismissed, sub nom., In re Merrill Lynch & Co., Inc. Research Reports Sec. Litig., 2003 WL 1872820 (S.D.N.Y. Apr. 10, 2003); affirmed in part, vacated and remanded in part, sub nom., Dabit v. Merrill Lynch, Pierce, Fenner & Smith, Inc., 395 F.3d 25 (2d Cir. 2005); cert. granted, 126 S.Ct. 34 (2005)

Holding
- The Securities Litigation Uniform Standards Act of 1998 preempts state law securities holder class actions even though such claims cannot be brought under federal securities laws.

Court membership
- Chief Justice John Roberts Associate Justices John P. Stevens · Antonin Scalia; Anthony Kennedy · David Souter; Clarence Thomas · Ruth Bader Ginsburg; Stephen Breyer · Samuel Alito

Case opinion
- Majority: Stevens, joined by Roberts, Scalia, Kennedy, Souter, Thomas, Ginsburg, Breyer
- Alito took no part in the consideration or decision of the case.

Laws applied
- 15 U.S.C. § 78bb(f)(1)(A) (section 101(b) of the Securities Litigation Uniform Standards Act of 1998)

Merrill Lynch, Pierce, Fenner & Smith, Inc. v. Dabit, 547 U.S. 71 (2006), was a case decided by the Supreme Court of the United States involving the extent to which state law securities fraud class action claims were preempted by the Securities Litigation Uniform Standards Act of 1998 (SLUSA). The Court unanimously ruled that SLUSA barred state law "holder" claims, which are based on losses caused when a shareholder retains stock due to fraud instead of selling it, even though federal securities laws only provided a private cause of action to those suffering losses caused by the purchase or sale of stock. The Court's decision resolved a split among the circuits and closed a significant loophole in the coverage of SLUSA, which it based on the broad language used in the Act and the policies behind it.

== Facts ==
In 2002, the investment banking firm Merrill Lynch became the target of an investigation by the Attorney General of New York, based on the suspicion that the firm's loyalty to its investment banking clients had caused it to render biased investment advice. Though Merrill Lynch settled that dispute, the investigation spurred a number of private securities fraud class action lawsuits, including one filed by Shadi Dabit, a former Merrill Lynch stockbroker, in the U.S. District Court for the Western District of Oklahoma.

=== Class action allegations ===
Dabit claimed that Merrill Lynch had manipulated stock prices by disseminating misleading research, and consequently using its misinformed stockbrokers to artificially inflate the value of its investment banking clients' stock. In this alleged scheme, the research analysts issued unrealistically optimistic reports upon which the brokers relied in advising their clients and in deciding whether to hold on to their own stock, and that both the clients and brokers held on to their stock long past the point at which they would have sold if they had accurate information. By the time the truth was revealed around the time of the Attorney General's investigation, the price of the stocks had plummeted, causing the stockholders to lose value and the brokers to lose commissions when their misinformed clients took their business elsewhere. Dabit's complaint claimed damages on behalf of himself and all class members against Merrill Lynch under Oklahoma state law for breach of fiduciary duty.

=== First motion to dismiss ===
Merrill Lynch moved to dismiss the class action, arguing that it was preempted by the Securities Litigation Uniform Standards Act, which bars class action lawsuits from bringing state law claims for fraud "in connection with the purchase or sale" of securities. The District Court agreed that SLUSA preempted Dabit's claims based on the purchase of stock, and dismissed with leave to amend so he could separate out the "holder" claims, based on the retention of stock. By the time Dabit filed his amended complaint, dozens of similar class actions had been filed around the country. The Judicial Panel on Multidistrict Litigation then transferred all of the cases, included Dabit's, to the Southern District of New York for pre-trial consolidation.

=== Second motion to dismiss and the Second Circuit's decision ===
Merrill Lynch again moved for dismissal, which was granted by Senior Judge Milton Pollack, on the grounds that the claims were "squarely within SLUSA's ambit." However, this decision was reversed on appeal by the Second Circuit Court of Appeals, one of the ruling judges being Sonia Sotomayor. The court ruled that the holder claims did not satisfy the SLUSA requirement that the fraud claims be brought "in connection with the purchase or sale" of securities. Though recognizing the typically broad interpretation that language has been given, the Second Circuit believed Congress meant to incorporate the Supreme Court's limitation from Blue Chip Stamps v. Manor Drug Stores, 421 U.S. 723 (1975), which ruled that only those suffering direct loss from the purchase or sale of stock had standing to sue under federal securities law. To the extent that Dabit's amended complaint alleged that Merrill Lynch had fraudulently induced the stockholders to retain their stock and not to purchase or sell it, the Second Circuit determined that his class action fell outside SLUSA's preemptive scope. The case was nonetheless remanded for dismissal with leave to amend again, because the amended complaint still did not necessarily exclude purchaser claims.

== Judgment ==
The Supreme Court vacated the Second Circuit's decision. Justice John Paul Stevens delivered the Court's opinion, which was joined by the other seven Justices participating in the case.

=== Background of SLUSA ===
The Court began its analysis by summarizing the legal history preceding the enactment of SLUSA. In 1942, the Securities Exchange Commission promulgated SEC Rule 10b-5, which broadly prohibits any "deceptive device" or fraud "in connection with the purchase or sale of securities." Courts recognized a private cause of action under Rule 10b-5 since 1946 despite the lack of explicit language to this effect. However, the majority of courts limited this to plaintiffs asserting purchaser or seller claims, rather than holder claims. The Supreme Court adopted this limitation in Blue Chip Stamps, despite the broad language in 10b-5 and despite the lack of a similar limitation upon government enforcement of the Rule. The Court found a policy for this limit in the "vexatiousness" that Rule 10b-5 litigation represented, which provided for substantial settlements in even weak cases due to the interference a pending lawsuit caused with normal business.

The Court believed that similar policy considerations prompted Congress in 1995 to pass the Private Securities Litigation Reform Act, on the belief that, as a House Report asserted, the class action device was being used to injure "the entire U. S. economy" by filing mere nuisance lawsuits, targeting deep-pocket defendants, making burdensome discovery requests, and through "manipulation by class action lawyers of the clients whom they purport to represent." The PSLRA imposed new restrictions such as damage caps and heightened pleading requirements on securities plaintiffs, and consequently prompted many to seek state court venues to avoid the new strictures. To prevent these state class actions from frustrating the purposes of the PSLRA, Congress then enacted SLUSA in 1998.

=== Interpretation of SLUSA text and policy ===
Dabit argued that the SLUSA language "in connection with the purchase or sale" should be read narrowly, so as to only apply to the purchaser-seller actions that Blue Chip Stamps required for private actions under Rule 10b-5. However, the Court pointed out that Blue Chip Stamps expressly relied upon "policy considerations" in crafting that limitation, not the text of the Rule, and that the decision was only defining the judicially crafted private right of action, not the words "in connection with the purchase or sale" of securities. The Court asserted that it had always given broad meaning to the words themselves, as in the context of SEC enforcement actions, and that it is presumed that Congress was aware of this when it enacted SLUSA.

The Court also found that policy considerations supported its interpretation. Omitting holder claims from SLUSA's coverage—the very form of vexatious litigation targeted in Blue Chip Stamps—would be contrary to its purpose of preventing state law claims from frustrating the ends of the PSLRA. As holder claims were typically based on the same facts as purchaser-seller actions, if they were not preempted, wasteful litigation based on identical facts could proceed in parallel proceedings in federal and state courts. The existence of explicit exemptions in the statute (none applicable in this case) also discouraged the Court from itself finding further exemptions through implication. Finally, prior to the post-PSLRA exodus of securities claims to state courts, state law securities fraud claims were rare; the presumption against preemption that a "historically entrenched state-law remedy" enjoys was not present here.

== See also ==
- Villalba v Merrill Lynch & Co Inc
- List of United States Supreme Court cases, volume 547
