= Margaret Sachs =

American lawyer

Margaret V. Sachs
- Education: Harvard University, B.A. Harvard Law School, J.D.
- Occupation: Law professor
- Employer: University of Georgia
- Notable work: Securities Litigation and Enforcement: Cases and Materials (with Donna M. Nagy and Richard Painter)
- Title: Robert Cotten Alston Chair in Corporate Law Emerita
- Website: https://www.law.uga.edu/profile/margaret-v-sachs

Margaret V. Sachs is an American lawyer and professor emerita at the University of Georgia, where she was the Robert Cotten Alston Chair in Corporate Law. Sachs specialised in corporate law and securities law.

== Life and career ==
Sachs received a B.A. from Harvard University and her J.D. from Harvard Law School.

Sachs joined the faculty of the University of Georgia School of Law in 1990, where she taught corporate law and securities law until her retirement in 2018. She is the co-author of a securities litigation and enforcement casebook with Donna M. Nagy and Richard Painter. Sachs is a member of the American Law Institute.

She served on the executive committees of the corporations and security regulation sections of the Association of American Law Schools.

Research published by Sachs covers topics including SEC Rule 10b-5, freedom of contract, women in corporate law teaching, fraud on the market, and SEC v. Texas Gulf Sulphur Co.
