= Forward-looking statement =

Statement in financial report

In United States business law, a forward-looking statement or safe harbor statement is a statement that cannot sustain itself as merely a historical fact. A forward-looking statement predicts, projects, or uses future events as expectations or possibilities. These statements can often be misleading, as they can be mistaken for factual statements, while they are actually speculation. According to United States Code 15 Section 78u-5, a forward-looking statement may include future economic performance, such as revenues or income, plans for future operations, or use of a report written by an outside reviewer.

== United States law ==
Under U.S. law, section 27A of the Securities Act of 1933, as amended, and section 21E of the Securities Exchange Act of 1934, as amended, businesses must comply to standards of communication that limit risk factors. These acts were put into place partially to protect investors from ambiguous language, preventing them from making a poorly informed investment decision based on speculative statements.

The Private Securities Litigation Reform Act of 1995 provides a "safe harbor" for certain forward-looking statements. Businesses usually include a form of a disclaimer that states that any instance of a forward-looking statement found in their material is only true at the time it was written, and they further claim that they are under no obligation to update such written statements if conditions change or that unexpected occurrences happen to affect the statement afterwards. Such forward-looking statements, however, must be identifiable by the use of certain prescribed words. This act allows companies to make speculative statements based on current market trends or research directions without fear of major repercussion, while ensuring that potential investors are informed of the speculative nature of the statements.

=== Linguistic perspective ===
Sentences and phrases are forward-looking statements when they include any tense from present to future or similar inflection. Words like "believe", "estimate", "anticipate", "plan", "predict", "may", "hope", "can", "will", "should", "expect", "likely", "is likely to", "intend", "is designed to", "with the intent", "potential", the negative of these words or such other variations thereon or comparable terminology, may indicate forward-looking statements, but their absence does not mean that a statement is not forward-looking.

== Examples ==
Below are some hypothetical examples of forward-looking statements:

- Company X plans on building a new facility in Asia by 2025, expanding our current market share.
- We anticipate the value of our company to continue to rise for over the next few years, increasing dividends for shareholders.
- We predict that our product will revolutionize the healthcare industry, improving the quality of healthcare for millions of patients.

An example of a safe harbor disclaimer that is generally given during earnings release of a company is this statement by Oracle:

"Our discussion may include predictions, estimates or other information that might be considered forward-looking. While these forward-looking statements represent our current judgment on what the future holds, they are subject to risks and uncertainties that could cause actual results to differ materially. You are cautioned not to place undue reliance on these forward-looking statements, which reflect our opinions only as of the date of this presentation. Please keep in mind that we are not obligating ourselves to revise or publicly release the results of any revision to these forward-looking statements in light of new information or future events. Throughout today’s discussion, we will attempt to present some important factors relating to our business that may affect our predictions. You should also review our most recent Form 10-K and Form 10-Q for a more complete discussion of these factors and other risks, particularly under the heading “Risk Factors.” A PDF copy of our press release and financial tables which include a GAAP to non-GAAP reconciliation can be viewed and downloaded on the Oracle Investor Relations website […]."

== See also ==
- Initial public offering
- Prospectus
- SEC Rule 10b-5 § Forward-looking statements

== Notes ==
1. The Register's interpretation of Judge Chandler's decision, "lies…[cannot] obtain shelter as forward-looking statements"
