= Private Securities Litigation Reform Act =

U.S. federal statute also known as PSLRA

Private Securities Litigation Reform Act of 1995
- Long title: An Act to reform Federal securities litigation, and for other purposes.
- Enacted by: the 104th United States Congress

Citations
- Public law: Pub. L. 104-67
- Statutes at Large: 109 Stat. 737

Legislative history
- Introduced in the House as H.R. 1058 by Tom Bliley on February 27, 1995

The Private Securities Litigation Reform Act of 1995, Pub. L. 104–67 (text) (PDF), 109 Stat. 737 (codified as amended in scattered sections of 15 U.S.C.) ("PSLRA") implemented several substantive changes in the United States that have affected certain cases brought under the federal securities laws, including changes related to pleading, discovery, liability, class representation, and awards fees and expenses.

The PSLRA was designed to limit frivolous securities lawsuits. Prior to the PSLRA, plaintiffs could proceed with minimal evidence of fraud, and then use pretrial discovery to seek further proof. That set a very low barrier to initiate litigation, which encouraged the filing of weak or entirely-frivolous suits. Defending against the suits could prove extremely costly, even when the charges were unfounded, and so defendants often found it cheaper to settle than to fight and win.

Under the PSLRA, however, plaintiffs must meet a heightened pleading standard before they can initiate a suit. In other words, PSLRA was specifically intended to make it more difficult to initiate securities litigation (frivolous or otherwise) because plaintiffs would supposedly be forced to present evidence of fraud before any pretrial discovery has taken place.

Also, PSLRA was enacted to "give teeth to Section 11." Congress specifically pointed to the reluctance of judges to impose Section 11 sanctions as an additional reason for the passage of the legislation.

The PSLRA does impose some new rules on securities class action lawsuits. It allows judges to decide the most adequate plaintiff in class actions by favoring institutional investors with large dollar amounts at stake. It mandates full disclosure to investors of proposed settlements, including the amount of attorneys' fees. It bars bonus payments to favored plaintiffs and permits judges to scrutinize lawyer conflicts of interest.

== Background: Overview of securities fraud actions under Section 10(b) and Rule 10b-5 ==
The Securities Exchange Act of 1934 (commonly known as the "Exchange Act" or the "1934 Act") gives shareholders the right to bring a private action in federal court to recover damages the shareholder sustained as a result of securities fraud. The majority of securities fraud claims are brought pursuant to Section 10(b) of the Exchange Act (codified at 15 U.S.C. § 78j), as well as pursuant to SEC Rule 10b-5, which the SEC promulgated under the authority granted to it by Congress under the Exchange Act. Federal securities fraud actions will be referred to as "Rule 10b-5 actions" or "Rule 10b-5 cases" as convenient shorthand.

The Supreme Court has held that there are six elements that a plaintiff must allege and prove to prevail in a Rule 10b-5 action:

1. The defendant made a "material misrepresentation or omission";
2. the defendant acted with "scienter", a "wrongful state of mind" (typically understood to mean that the defendant intended to make the material misrepresentation or omission or acted with recklessness in making the misrepresentation or omission);
3. the material misrepresentation or omission was made "in connection with the purchase or sale of a security";
4. the plaintiff who was allegedly victimized by the fraud relied upon the material misrepresentation or omission (if the security is traded on a public stock exchange, such as the New York Stock Exchange or NASDAQ, the law typically presumes that shareholders rely on the integrity of the market and therefore that the price of the stock reflected material misrepresentation and that shareholders relied upon the integrity of the market);
5. the plaintiff suffered an economic loss as a result of the alleged fraud; and
6. the plaintiff can allege and prove "loss causation," which means that the allegedly-fraudulent misrepresentation or omission caused the plaintiff's economic loss. See Dura Pharmaceuticals, Inc. v. Broudo, 544 U.S. 336 (2005).

Each of the elements has been heavily litigated in thousands of cases over the past 70 years, and the courts have applied the six elements in a multitude of different factual situations.

== In context: Procedural course of modern securities fraud actions ==
In a typical Rule 10b-5 claim, the plaintiff starts the action by filing a complaint in federal court. Other actions alleging substantially similar claims may also be filed. The PSLRA mandates the consolidation of those actions into one lawsuit followed by the appointment of a plaintiff or group of plaintiffs to serve as the lead plaintiff. More than one plaintiff typically seeks to serve as the lead plaintiff. The court overseeing the lawsuit typically appoints the plaintiff with the "largest financial interest" in the action, or greatest sustained loss, to serve as the plead plaintiff. The defendant will then file a motion to dismiss under Rule 12(b)(6) of the Federal Rules of Civil Procedure. A motion to dismiss under Rule 12(b)(6) is essentially an argument by the defendant that even if all of the facts alleged in the complaint were assumed to be true, they would not be sufficient to give rise to liability under Rule 10b-5. If the court determines that the facts alleged in the complaint are sufficient to state a Rule 10b-5 claim, the plaintiff then becomes entitled to obtain "discovery" from the defendant, which typically means the right to demand documentary evidence in the defendant's possession concerning the facts at issue, and the right to require the defendant (and other witnesses) to sit for depositions.

In a modern litigation context, the discovery process is protracted and very expensive and often involves production of millions of pages of documents and depositions of dozens of witnesses and costs the defendant as much as millions of dollars in legal fees. Thus, it is extremely important to the litigants if a motion to dismiss is granted, as the costs of litigation increase substantially when the motion to dismiss is denied.

If the plaintiff's complaint survives the defendant's Rule 12(b)(6) motion to dismiss, the next step is usually for the plaintiff to seek class certification under Rule 23 of the Federal Rules of Civil Procedure. If the court grants the plaintiff's motion for class certification, the case becomes a securities fraud class action, and the defendant then usually faces enormous liability if the case goes to trial, and the jury renders a verdict against the defendant.

For example, if the plaintiff class is composed of 50,000 shareholders, each shareholder owns an average of 1,000 shares, and each shareholder claims to have sustained losses of $10 per share, the potential compensatory damages are $500 million. Therefore, as a practical matter, if a Rule 10b-5 case is not dismissed on a motion to dismiss and is certified as a class action, the defendant faces a lot of pressure to settle the case. Even if the plaintiff has a relatively weak case, the expected value of going to trial will put the defendant under pressure to settle. That is, the cost of high-enough-damages, even when it is multiplied by the small chance of losing a jury verdict, may still be very high.

Thus, the outcome of a motion to dismiss in a Rule 10b-5 case essentially determines whether the case gets dismissed, or it proceeds to discovery and very often results in class certification and a very large settlement. Because the motion to dismiss is a pivotal stage in the course of a Rule 10b-5 case, the attorneys for plaintiffs and defendants argue fiercely over the rules that govern such motion to dismiss. Plaintiff lawyers advocate less demanding standards, as such standards would result in a larger number of cases to proceed to discovery and higher amounts of settlements. Defense lawyers and the corporations that they represent, on the other hand, advocate more demanding standards, for opposite reasons.

Both sides in the debate use rhetoric that claims the mantle of "justice." The defense bar generally contends that lower pleading standards allow more frivolous lawsuits and extorted settlements that primarily benefit plaintiff lawyers, not shareholders. On the other hand, the plaintiffs' bar claims that higher pleading standards enable corporate executives to loot their companies and to defraud innocent shareholders with impunity.

The importance of the ratification of the PSLRA in 1995 can be fully appreciated only when by noting such long-running debate between the plaintiff bar and the defense bar over the applicable standards governing Rule 12(b)(6) motions to dismiss in Rule 10b-5 claims.

== Heightened pleading requirements ==
The legislative history reveals that Congress passed the PSLRA to curb the "abusive practices committed in private securities litigation" including "the routine filing of lawsuits against issuers of securities and others whenever there is a significant change in an issuer's stock price, without regard to any underlying culpability of the issuer, and with only faint hope that the discovery process might lead eventually to some plausible cause of action."

To reduce the number of purportedly-frivolous Rule 10b-5 lawsuits that survive motions to dismiss, the PSLRA raised the pleading standards for the specificity and the strength of the factual allegations that must be alleged in the plaintiff's complaint in three specific ways. Those changes are among the most significant aspects of the PSLRA.

=== Requirement that false statements be pleaded "with particularity" ===
The PSLRA requires a plaintiff to identify in his complaint "each statement alleged to have been misleading, the reason or reasons why the statement is misleading, and if an allegation regarding the statement or omission is made on information and belief, the complaint shall state with particularity all facts on which that belief is formed." 15 U.S.C. § 78u-4(b)(1). If a plaintiff's complaint does not specifically identify the allegedly fraudulent statements and explain why they were misleading, the complaint is dismissed. By requiring plaintiffs to set forth their theory regarding why a particular statement was misleading, the PSLRA enables defendants to put forth arguments as to why the challenged statement was not in fact misleading. Rule 9(b) of the Federal Rules of Civil Procedure had already required for allegations of fraud to be pleaded with particularity.

=== Requirement that pleading create a "strong inference" of scienter ===
The PSLRA also requires a plaintiff to allege that the defendant acted with the required state of mind and knew the challenged statement was false at the time it was made or was reckless in not recognizing that the statement was false (the legal term of art for that state of mind is scienter). In alleging scienter under the PSLRA, the plaintiff must, "with respect to each act or omission alleged to violate this chapter, state with particularity facts giving rise to a strong inference that the defendant acted with the required state of mind." 15 U.S.C. § 78u-4(b)(2). The requirement allows defendants to obtain dismissal of cases of the plaintiff merely pointing to a false statement and declares that the defendant "must have known" that the statement was false, based upon the position within the company.

==== Tellabs v. Makor (06/21/2007) interprets the standard ====
The United States Supreme Court, in an opinion written by Justice Ruth Bader Ginsburg and issued June 21, 2007, interpreted the standard. The Court ruled that for plaintiffs to allege a "strong inference" of intentional fraud, the inference must be "cogent" and "at least as compelling as any opposing inference of nonfraudulent intent." The US Circuit Courts of Appeal had adopted substantially-disparate tests for determining whether scienter is sufficiently pleaded:

Four circuits, the First, Fourth, Sixth and Ninth, require a direct comparison of the plausibility of competing inferences. Unless the culpable inference is the "most plausible," it is not "strong" and the complaint should be dismissed. Two circuits, the Eighth and the Tenth, consider all inferences, both of scienter and of an innocent mental state, using the innocent inferences to test whether the culpable interest is strong, but do not directly weigh one against the other. The Second and Third circuits divide the factual allegations bearing on a defendant's mental state into categories, "motive and opportunity" and "strong circumstantial evidence" of knowing or reckless conduct, either of which may independently satisfy the strong inference requirement. And, the Seventh Circuit... did not consider competing inferences, but concluded that if an inference of culpability exists, the pleading is sufficient.

=== Requirement for plaintiff to prove loss causation ===
Finally, the PSLRA also makes clear that a plaintiff in a Rule 10b-5 case "shall have the burden of proving that the act or omission of the defendant... caused the loss for which the plaintiff seeks to recover damages" (15 U.S.C. § 78u-4(b)(4)). At one time, there was a question over whether the requirement actually applied at the motion to dismiss stage. The statute says that the plaintiff must "prove" loss causation, but it does not say the plaintiff must "allege" loss causation. However, after the Supreme Court's decision in Dura Pharmaceuticals v. Broudo, it is now clear that a plaintiff must allege loss causation in its complaint.

==== Dura decision and loss causation ====
The Dura decision held that a plaintiff in a Rule 10b-5 case had not adequately pleaded loss causation by merely alleging that he "paid artificially inflated prices for Dura securities" at the time of purchase. The Supreme Court observed that an investor who purchases a stock at an artificially-inflated price suffers no economic loss at the time of purchase. The loss occurs only when the truth is disclosed and the stock price falls as a result. Thus, a plaintiff who sells his shares "before the relevant truth begins to leak out" does not suffer any economic damage. The plaintiff in Dura failed to allege that the "share price fell significantly after the truth became known" and so the complaint had not alleged loss causation.

How a court defines the "relevant truth" that the defendant fraudulently withheld often determines the outcome of a 10b-5 case. The stock analyst cases provide a good example of the importance of how the "relevant truth" is defined. The claim in most stock analyst cases is that the analyst dishonestly touted a particular stock as a good investment despite the analyst's genuine belief. Under Dura, such cases are often dismissed because, in most instances, the analyst's dishonesty never comes to light until after the price of the stock in question has declined substantially. By then, the "bad facts" about the company have already been absorbed by the market and so plaintiffs cannot show that the disclosure of the analyst's dishonesty caused any further decline in the stock price.

== Stay of discovery ==
To prevent discovery until a court has deemed a securities fraud complaint sufficient, the PSLRA also imposes a procedural stay of all discovery "during the pendency of any motion to dismiss." The stay operates against all parties, including both plaintiffs and defendants.

The Securities Litigation Uniform Standards Act has amended that provision to allow a federal court to impose the discovery stay on related securities suits in state court.

== Enhanced audit duties and obligations ==
Section 301 adds additional duties to a firm's auditor, including a requirement to report evidence of illegal activity to the firm's Board of Directors, or the Board of Directors' Audit Committee. The Board of Directors or subunit is consequently obligated to notify the Securities and Exchange Commission of such notification by auditors within one day. If the auditing accountant does not receive a copy of the SEC notification within one day, the auditor must withdraw from the engagement and notify the SEC directly of the report made to the Board. That provision constitutes an important affirmative requirement of auditors to breach confidentiality. Although PSLRA reduced the public protections from fraudulent operations within a public company that issue from fraudster's aversion to civil liability, the burden of decreasing fraud risk is shifted by PSLRA to auditors of public firms, which presumably have deeper access to critical financial operations and details.

== Legislative history ==
The PSLRA was enacted into law by the U.S. Congress over a veto by President Bill Clinton. The U.S. House of Representatives approved the bill by a 319–100 margin, and the U.S. Senate approved it, 68–30. Every Republican in the House voted in favor of the legislation, and only four Republicans in the Senate voted against it: William Cohen, John McCain, Richard Shelby, and Arlen Specter. Prominent liberals in the Democratic Party like Senators Tom Harkin, Ted Kennedy, Claiborne Pell, and Carol Moseley Braun voted in favor of the legislation, but many conservative-to-moderate Democrats such as Senators John Breaux, Robert Byrd, Fritz Hollings, and Sam Nunn and Representatives such as John Murtha and Gene Taylor voted against it. There was one other time during Bill Clinton's presidency that Congress successfully overrode one of his 37 vetoes to enact a bill into law.

The PSLRA was originally developed as part of Newt Gingrich's Contract With America. Its principal authors in the House were Representatives Thomas Bliley, Jack Fields and Christopher Cox. Senators Chris Dodd and Pete Domenici sponsored the legislation in the Senate.

== See also ==
- Forward-looking statement
- In re American Realty Capital Properties, Inc. Litigation, regarding alleged violations of Section 11 of the Securities Act of 1933.
