= United States v. O'Hagan =

- Supreme Court of the United States

Argued April 16, 1997 Decided June 25, 1997
- Full case name: United States, Petitioner v. James Herman O'Hagan
- Citations: 521 U.S. 642 (more) 117 S. Ct. 2199; 138 L. Ed. 2d 724

Case history
- Prior: 92 F.3d 612 (8th Cir. 1996); cert. granted, 519 U.S. 1087 (1997).
- Subsequent: On remand, 139 F.3d 641 (8th Cir. 1998).

Holding
- A person who trades in securities for personal profit, using confidential information misappropriated in breach of a fiduciary duty to the source of the information, may be held liable for violating § 10(b) and Rule 10b-5, and so the SEC did not exceed its authority under § 14(e) by adopting Rule 14e-3(a) without requiring a showing that such trading entailed a breach of fiduciary duty.

Court membership
- Chief Justice William Rehnquist Associate Justices John P. Stevens · Sandra Day O'Connor; Antonin Scalia · Anthony Kennedy; David Souter · Clarence Thomas; Ruth Bader Ginsburg · Stephen Breyer

Case opinions
- Majority: Ginsburg, joined by Stevens, O'Connor, Kennedy, Souter, Breyer; Scalia (parts I, III, IV)
- Concur/dissent: Scalia
- Concur/dissent: Thomas, joined by Rehnquist

Laws applied
- Securities Exchange Act of 1934 § 10(b), Rule 10b-5

United States v. O'Hagan, 521 U.S. 642 (1997), was a United States Supreme Court case concerning insider trading and breach of U.S. Securities and Exchange Commission Rule 10(b) and 10(b)-5. In an opinion written by Justice Ruth Bader Ginsburg, the Court held that an individual may be found liable for violating Rule 10(b)-5 by misappropriating confidential information. The Court also held that the Securities and Exchange Commission did not exceed its rulemaking authority when it adopted Rule 14e-3(a), "which proscribes trading on undisclosed information in the tender offer setting, even in the absence of a duty to disclose".

== Background ==
James O'Hagan was a partner at Minneapolis law firm Dorsey & Whitney. In July 1988, the firm was retained by Grand Metropolitan, a corporation with headquarters in London, which was considering an offer to take over the Pillsbury Company, headquartered in Minneapolis. Even though he was not directly involved in the transaction, O'Hagan learned about the possible takeover by overhearing a discussion at lunch. In August 1988, O'Hagan began purchasing stock and options of the Pillsbury company, at around $39 per share.

By the end of September, O'Hagan owned approximately 5,000 shares of Pillsbury and 2,500 options – more than any other individual investor. In October, Grand Met announced the takeover bid and the price of Pillsbury stock rose to $60 per share. O'Hagan subsequently sold his stock at a profit of more than $4.3 million.

== Opinion of the Court ==
The Court held that O'Hagan could be found liable under Rule 10(b) for misappropriating confidential information, and the court remanded the case the United States Court of Appeals for the Eighth Circuit for further proceedings. Because O'Hagan was not directly involved in the proposed takeover, he was not obliged by SEC rules to refrain from trading Pillsbury's stock or to disclose his transactions. Though it didn't find O'Hagan in violation of SEC rules regarding trading by company insiders – known as the "classical doctrine theory" – the Supreme Court adopted an additional doctrine, the "misappropriation theory" set out by Chief Justice Warren Burger in Chiarella v. United States.

== See also ==
- List of United States Supreme Court cases, volume 521
- List of United States Supreme Court cases
- Lists of United States Supreme Court cases by volume
- List of United States Supreme Court cases by the Rehnquist Court
