= FirstCash =

American pawnshop company

FirstCash Holdings, Inc.
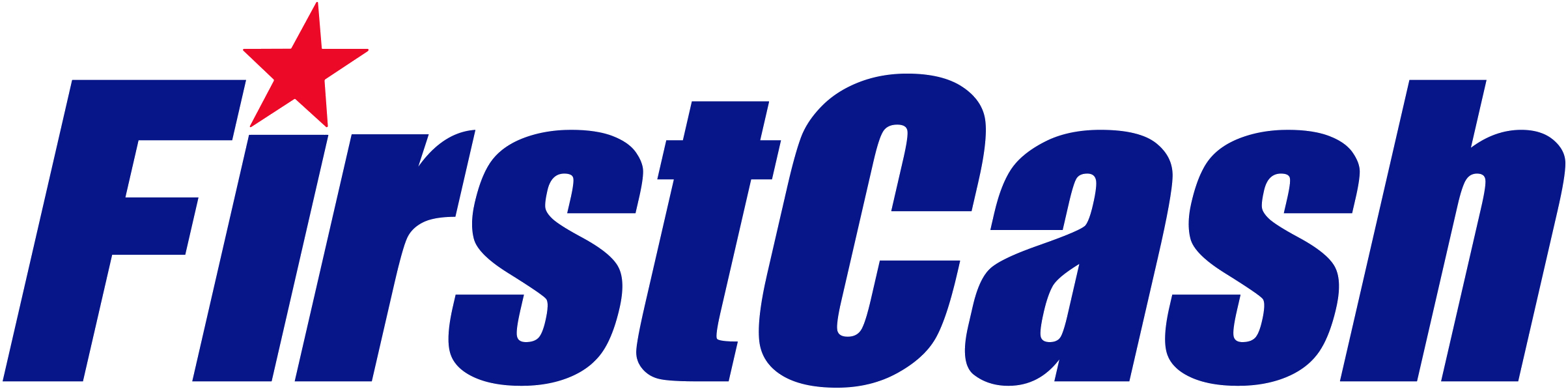
- Type: Public
- Traded as: Nasdaq: FCFS; S&P 400 Component; PHLX: FQO, FCFS
- Industry: Retail
- Founded: 1983; 43 years ago
- Headquarters: Fort Worth, Texas, U.S.
- Area served: United States, Mexico, Guatemala, Colombia, El Salvador
- Services: Pawnbroker, services
- Website: firstcash.com

FirstCash Holdings, Inc. is an American pawnshop company headquartered in Fort Worth, Texas which operates retail pawn stores in the U.S. and Latin America. It is a publicly traded company listed on the Nasdaq stock exchange.

In September 2016, the company merged with Cash America International, Inc. and in December 2021, the company acquired American First Finance.

Through its wholly owned subsidiary, American First Finance (“AFF”), it also provides lease-to-own (“LTO”) and retail finance payment solutions for consumer goods and services through a nationwide network of active retail merchant partner locations.

== History ==
Jack Daugherty founded Cash America in 1983 (possibly 1984), after prior experience running a pawn shop and a failed venture hunting for oil. He reinvested his earnings into acquiring more pawn shops, growing his business to 36 locations by 1987 and 101 at the end of 1988. Daugherty resigned as CEO in 1999 in favor of company president Daniel R. Feehan, though he remained with the company as chairman of the board. Feehan similarly retired in 2015 and assumed the chairmanship; Daugherty stepped down but continued to serve on the board.

John R. Payne, Sr. founded First Cash in 1988, following his experiences owning a series of pawn shops in Dallas and Fort Worth. By 1991, Payne had expanded the company to six pawn shops and reincorporated in Delaware, taking the company public to raise funds for expansion. Payne would step down as chief executive in favor of company president Rick Powell in 1992, before departing to pursue other interests the following year. The company would continue to grow by purchasing smaller pawn shop chains, and in 1998 became the first major pawnbroker to sell merchandise via the Internet. Powell remained CEO until 2004, and chairman of the board until stepping down in 2010.

=== Notable Acquisitions ===
In 1998, First Cash purchased California-based Miraglia Inc, a provider of check-cashing software and owner of 11 check-cashing stores.

In 2010, Cash America acquired Maxit Financial for $70 million in cash and stock.

In September 2016, Cash America International and First Cash Financial Services completed a "merger of equals", producing a new company with the name of FirstCash, Inc.

In 2021, FirstCash entered the "buy now, pay later" payments industry with the acquisition of American First Finance. The deal was announced on October 28 with a value of $1.17 billion, and closed on December 16 with a final value of $916 million.

=== Controversies and Lawsuits ===
In 2010, First Cash board chairman and former CEO Rick Powell resigned his position in the company following a Wells notice of an insider trading investigation. The SEC accused him of purchasing 100,000 shares of company stock, the day before the company announced a 3-million-share buyback. According to the SEC's complaint, this trade led First Cash to overpay for its shares by approximately $36,000 and earned Powell $124,000 in profit due to a rise in stock price. A court dismissed the claim in October 2012, as First Cash had already disclosed the existence of the buyback program, if not its timing, and ruled that Powell's knowledge and actions did not rise to the standard of material nonpublic information.

In November 2021, the Consumer Financial Protection Bureau filed a lawsuit against FirstCash and its subsidiary, Cash America West, for alleged violations of the Military Lending Act and a 2013 CFPB order against the same. While the Military Lending Act prohibits loans to servicemembers and their families with annual interest above 36%, the CFPB accused the company of making thousands of loans with interest rates as high as 200%.

In September 2022, the company paid $379,125.73 to 253 workers in Seattle, Washington, in order to settle claims that it violated the city's minimum wage, break time, and leave laws. As part of the settlement, it also paid $4,746.96 to the city of Seattle.
