= Nicholas Schorsch =

American businessman

Nicholas S. Schorsch
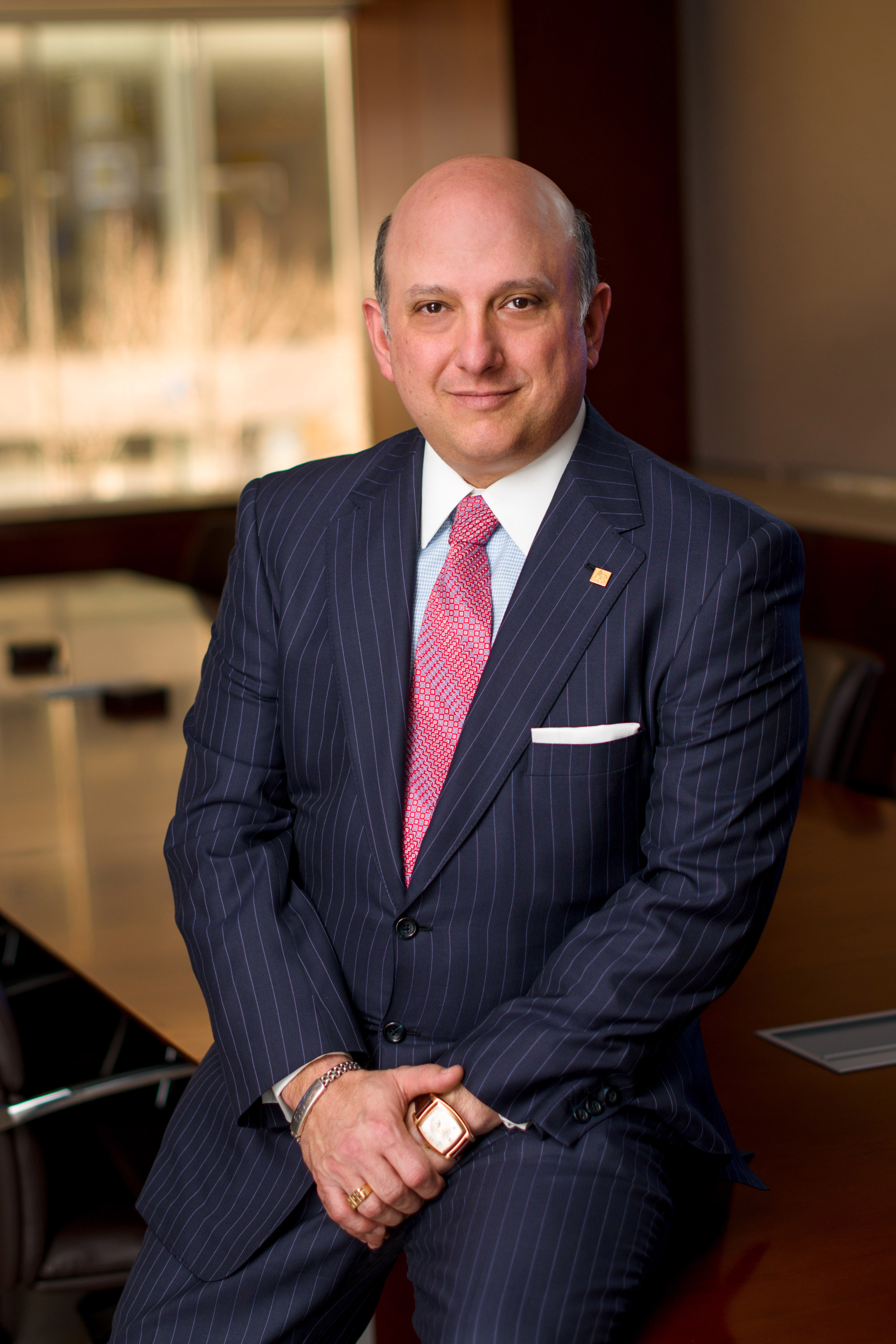
- Nicholas S Schorsch in 2014
- Born: March 2, 1961 (age 65); Philadelphia, Pennsylvania, United States
- Education: Drexel University
- Spouse: Shelley Davis

Nicholas Sloan "Nick" Schorsch (born March 2, 1961) is an American millionaire entrepreneur, investor, and philanthropist. Schorsch is the chairman, CEO, and co-founder of the investment services firm American Realty Capital Properties Inc., which changed its name to VEREIT after a major accounting scandal.

== Early life ==
Schorsch was born in Philadelphia, Pennsylvania, to Irvin G. Schorsch, Jr., and Anita (née Ulick) Schorsch. He worked for his family's scrap metal business starting at the age of 17, while attending Drexel University full-time, before taking over ownership of the business. He grew the business to millions of dollars in revenue and sold it for $50 million at age 23.

He founded Thermal Reduction Corporation, a metal product manufacturing business. Over ten years he built up the company through a series of mergers and acquisitions, eventually selling his interest in 1994.

== Early career ==
In 1995, he and his wife Shelley co-founded the Jenkintown-based American Financial Resource Group, which originally acquired operating companies in the printing, label, and financial services sector. Within two years, the company diversified into the acquisition of commercial real estate properties. In 1998, Schorsch learned of a merger between CoreStates Financial Corporation, a bank with whom he did business, and First Union Corporation. As a result of the pending merger, 106 of CoreStates' bank branches were set to close. Upon hearing this, Schorsch offered to buy every (vacant) bank branch building. He recalled in a 2005 interview in The New York Times, "They [the bank] thought I was a crazy man." The $22.3 million deal was completed within 37 days, and within 12 months he sold or leased 95% of the properties.

In 2002, American Financial Resource Group became American Financial Realty Trust, or AFRT. Schorsch served as the company's president, CEO, and vice chairman of the board of trustees, listing it publicly on the New York Stock Exchange in 2003. Shortly after, Schorsch was dubbed "The Bankers Landlord" by The Philadelphia Inquirer. In 2006, Schorsch left AFRT.

== AR Capital and American Realty Capital Trust ==
Schorsch moved to New York City in 2007 where he, along with William M. "Bill" Kahane, founded the investment services firm American Realty Capital, later renamed AR Capital as the sponsor expanded into alternative investments vehicles other than commercial real estate. Shortly thereafter, the AR Capital partnership expanded to include Michael Weil, president and chief operating officer, Peter Budko, executive vice president and chief investment officer, and Brian Block, executive vice president and chief financial officer. AR Capital's flagship investment program was named American Realty Capital Trust, Inc., or ARCT. Similar to American Financial Realty Trust, ARCT would invest in single-tenant commercial real estate properties leased to corporate businesses that provided other essential goods and services, such as Walgreens, CVS, Dollar General, and Federal Express. In March 2012, American Realty Capital Trust, Inc., listed on the NASDAQ, providing liquidity for its shareholders. Schorsch served as chairman of the company from inception until January 2013, when it merged with Realty Income Corporation (NYSE: O).

Schorsch founded American Realty Capital Properties Inc. or ARCP, later named VEREIT, in 2010. In October 2014, the company admitted to an accounting error of $23 million, leading to significant sales of the company's stock and a drop in its value by $3 billion. The company fired Chief Financial Officer Brian Block after an audit committee investigation, and said that financial information in its 2013 10-K and Q1 and Q2 2014 quarterly reports "should no longer be relied upon." Lawsuits followed, with investors claiming ARCP had misstated financials in order to inflate financial results. In December Schorsch resigned as chairman.

In September 2019, VEREIT entered into agreements to settle pending class action litigation against it regarding among other things alleged violations of Section 11 of the 1933 Act (In re American Realty Capital Properties, Inc. Litigation and the remaining opt-out actions), at a cost to VEREIT of $765.5 million. American Realty Capital, led by Schorsch, and its principals paid $225 million towards the settlement.

== Realty Capital Securities ==
In 2008, the five partners of AR Capital used their own funds to create Realty Capital Securities, LLC, or RCS, a broker dealer seven times larger than any other broker-dealer operating in the industry at the time. They launched a series of investment programs at the same time, using the broker-dealer platform to raise capital for other sponsor companies in the industry. This would save sponsors the time, cost and risk of building their own broker-dealer, as well as generate substantial profit for RCS. In June 2013 Realty Capital Securities announced that it had reached another milestone, $10 billion of raised equity since inception. This coincided with Realty Capital Securities garnering a 53% market share in the real estate managing broker-dealer sales, more than five times that of the next competitor.

== New York REIT ==
On April 15, 2014 New York Recovery REIT, Inc., one of Schorsch's non-traded REIT programs, became New York REIT (NYSE:NYRT), the first traded REIT to acquire real estate exclusively in New York City. The portfolio consists of $2.7 billion worth of New York City properties, notably a $1.45 billion 48.9% stake in One Worldwide Plaza, a mixed use residential and commercial complex. Earlier in the year the fund managed to acquire an office building at 1440 Broadway, pushing into the Times Square sub-market, as well as the leasehold interest in the Viceroy Hotel.

== ARC Healthcare Trust listing and sale ==
On April 7, 2014 Schorsch listed yet another of his companies, American Realty Capital Healthcare Trust, Inc., on the NASDAQ exchange at $10.00 per share (NASDAQ:HCT). In January 2015, this medical-related property portfolio was purchased by Ventas, Inc. (NYSE: VTR) in an approximately $2.6 billion transaction, or at $11.33 per HCT share.

== RCS Capital Corporation ==
In 2013, Schorsch, along with the AR Capital partnership, united their broker-dealer, investment banking, transfer agency and transaction management companies under one holding company named RCS Capital Corporation. This was made available for public ownership in June 2013, when RCS Capital Corporation successfully closed its initial public offering and listed on the New York Stock Exchange (NYSE: RCAP). Shortly after RCAP's IPO, Schorsch announced the acquisition of First Allied Holdings, Inc., together with The Legend Group serving over 1,500 independent financial advisors. On October 1, 2013, RCS Capital announced the acquisition of The Hatteras Funds Group whose principal business is acting as sponsor, investment adviser and distributor of a family of mutual fund companies. On October 2, 2013, RCS Capital announced the acquisition of Investors Capital Holdings, Ltd. an independent broker-dealer and investment advisory services firm – a four-time winner of Investment Advisor's Broker-Dealer of the Year award. On November 15, RCS Capital announced the acquisition of asset management and investment advisory services firm Summit Financial Services Group, Inc. On January 16, 2014 RCS Capital announced that it had agreed to purchase Cetera Financial Group and on January 17, 2014 announced its similar intention to acquire J.P. Turner & Company for $1.15 billion and $27 million, respectively. An article by Investment News cited that "If all his deals come to fruition...his network would have close to 9,200 registered representatives and financial advisers producing about $1.73 billion in total annual revenue, placing him in the top tier of independent broker-dealers."

On April 29, 2014, RCAP announced that it had officially completed its acquisition of Cetera Financial Group. On June 11, 2014, the company completed its acquisition of Summit Financial Services Group. Two days later, on June 13, 2014, RCS Capital completed yet another of its previously announced Independent Broker-Dealer acquisitions, closing on J.P. Turner & Company.

As reported by Yahoo Finance, the RCS Capital share price rose to over $30. per share in 2014 prior to reports of massive insider selling of RCAP. Later, a trade journal, "Investment News", in 2015 disclosed a report of the directors of various non traded REIT's affiliated with the firm had been cashing out of their insider shares using the 5% redemption privilege built into the terms of the offerings. By late 2015 RCAP shares were trading for pennies.

On December 30, 2014, RCS Capital announced that Nicholas S. Schorsch notified the RCS Capital Board of his decision to step down from his position as director and executive chairman of the board. According to a press release issued by AR Capital, Schorsch made this decision in order to focus his attention on strategic initiatives and potential liquidity events of closed programs sponsored by AR Capital, and new strategies for the future suite of AR Capital investment programs. Schorsch was succeeded by Mark Auerbach, RCS Capital's former Lead Independent Director, to the role of chairman, effective immediately. On January 4, 2016, the NYSE suspended trading of RCAP after RCAP announced it reached an agreement in principle to restructure its debt and intended to file Chapter 11 bankruptcy in late January 2016.

== Business approach ==
Schorsch influenced the non-traded REIT industry in several ways, notably eliminating the "internalization fee" and prompting other sponsor companies to follow suit. Through American Realty Capital's Best Practice standards, Kahane and Schorsch made the focus on lowering fees a priority, contrary to industry convention. They proceeded to eliminate payment of asset management fees during the construction of their investment programs. Payment is taken in the form of restricted stock that only vests when "100% of shareholder capital is returned plus payment to investors of an annual 6% cumulative, pre-tax, non-compounded return on the capital contributed by investors." Schorsch is quoted as saying that the internalization fee "made no sense to investors. There's no logical reason they would pay."

== Accolades ==
He is often characterized as a pioneer in the alternative investment sector of the financial services industry, particularly due to his influence on the commercial real estate investment space. He has received a number of honors and public recognition for his impact on the industry, including the Ernst & Young Entrepreneur of the Year Award in 2003 and the Ernst & Young Entrepreneur of the Year Lifetime Achievement Award in 2011. He is also regarded as one of the principal figures contributing to the increased appeal and accessibility of commercial real estate investments to individual investors.

== Personal life ==
Nicholas Schorsch is married to Shelley Davis Schorsch and together they have five children; Nicholas, Sloane, Tessa, Zoey, and Victoria . He is an avid collector of American muscle cars, high performance cars and foreign sports cars. He is also an art collector, favoring colonial American art and antiques, as well as Modern art.

== Philanthropy ==
Nicholas Schorsch, his wife Shelley and his family support the following academic institutions, charitable causes and charitable foundations:

- The Gateway Middle School – Nicholas Schorsch serves on the board of trustees for The Gateway Middle School, which he helped found in 2007. Along with his wife, Shelley, he is a contributor to the school's events and activities.
- Drexel University – A Drexel University alumnus, Schorsch joined the board of trustees, where his duties as board member include engaging in the strategic planning process of the university.
- Hearts of Gold – Nicholas Schorsch is a member of the advisory board and former honorary chair of the charitable organization Hearts of Gold, which fosters a sustainable change in lifestyle and levels of self-sufficiency for NYC's homeless mothers and their children. In 2011, Schorsch was honored with the Hearts of Gold's Angel of the Year award for his supporting the organization.
- Historic Williamsburg, Mount Pleasant – In 2000, Nicholas and Shelley bought the historic, 400 acre Mount Pleasant Plantation, and worked toward restoring its historic appearance. Following the restoration of the property, they created the Mount Pleasant Foundation to preserve, support and share with the general public the rich historical resources of the area. In May 2012, they opened their home to visitors as part of the tour of Thomas Jefferson's life.
- The Hewitt School – Nicholas Schorsch is a member of the board of trustees for The Hewitt School, an independent school for girls grades K-12.
- Sarah Lawrence College – The Alma mater of Nicholas Schorsch Jr., Shelley and Nicholas support Sarah Lawrence College, where Shelly also formerly served as a trustee.
- Abington Friends School – Schorsch served as an assistant clerk (assistant chairman) of the board of trustees of Abington Friends School, located in Montgomery County, Pennsylvania.
