= Texas Gulf Sulphur Company =

American sulfur mining company

- Formerly: The Gulf Sulphur Company
- Industry: Sulfur mining
- Founded: December 23, 1909 in Texas, United States
- Defunct: 1981
- Fate: Acquired by Elf Aquitaine
- Headquarters: Texas, United States
- Areas served: Texas, St. Louis, Mexico, Ethiopia, Ontario
- Key people: Seeley W. Mudd (president 1916-)
- Products: Sulfur
- Owners: Elf Aquitaine since 1981
- Subsidiaries: Cia. Exploradora del Istmo, S.A., Texas Africa Exploration Company

The Texas Gulf Sulphur Company was one of the largest sulfur mining companies in the world from 1919 to 1981. By 1925 the company controlled 40% of the U.S. sulfur market. It was formed in 1909 and acquired in 1981, after expanding across the United States from Texas into Mexico, Canada, and Ethiopia.

SEC v. Texas Gulf Sulphur Co in 1981 was the first insider trading case on the federal level in the country.

== History ==
=== Founding and early mines (1909-1959) ===
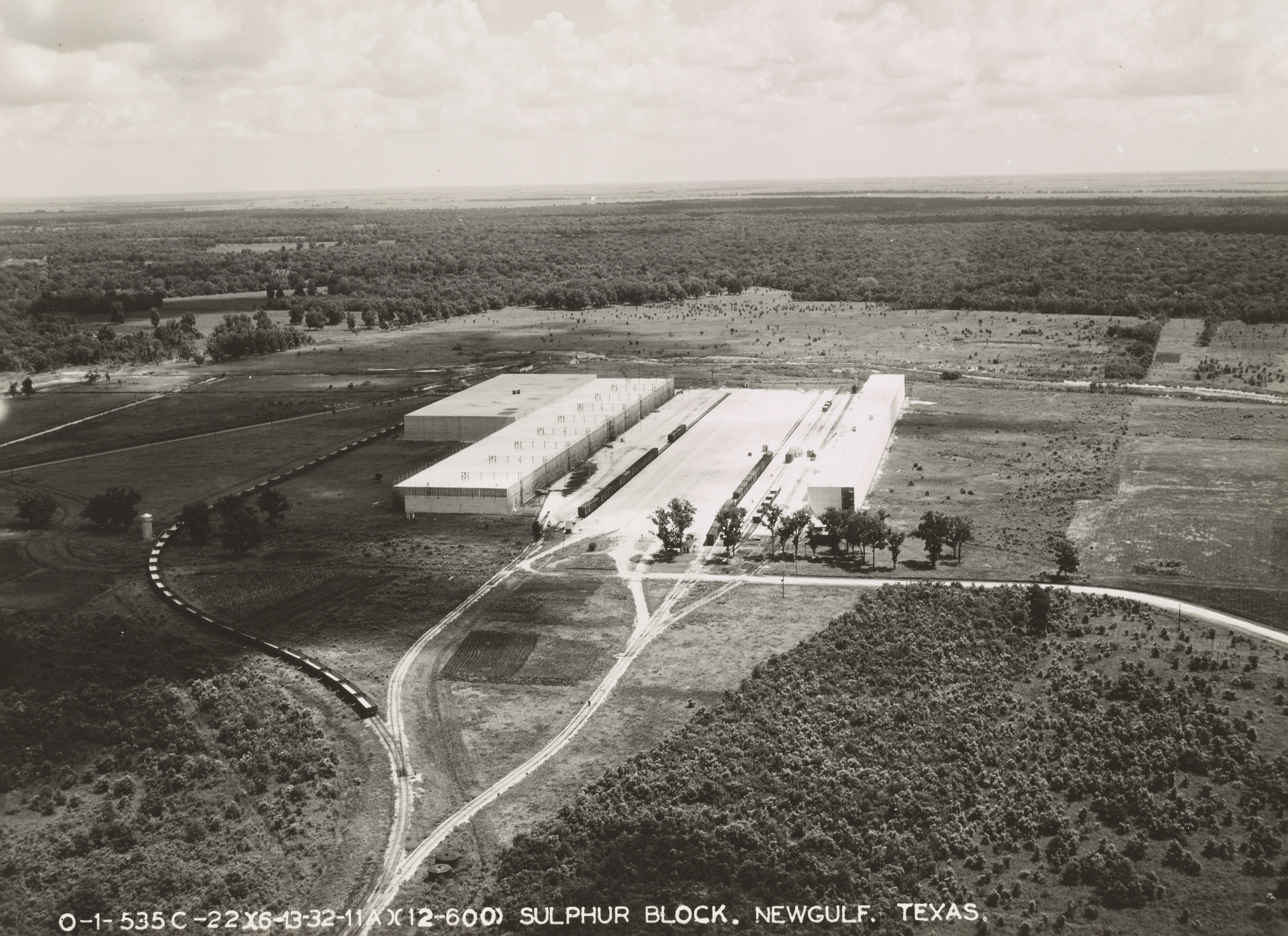
Sulphur blocks of the Texas Gulf Sulphur Company in Newgulf, 1932

The Gulf Sulphur Company was formed on December 23, 1909, by a group of investors from St. Louis and Texas. The company was formed to exploit the newly discovered sulfur deposit in the Big Hill salt dome near Matagorda, Texas, using the Frasch process. With the Frasch method, the underground sulphur deposit has superheated water pumped into it, with the sulfur then extracted when it melts. The patent to the system, by Herman Frasch, expired in 1908, one year before the Gulf Sulphur Company was formed to "exploit a newly developed sulphur deposit." In 1916 Bernard Baruch and J. P. Morgan took control of the company and Seeley W. Mudd became president. On July 16, 1918, the company was renamed the Texas Gulf Sulphur Company. Construction of the Gulf Plant at Big Hill started on August 13, 1918, and production commenced on March 15, 1919.

In 1921 the company listed its stock on the New York Stock Exchange. Sulfur production began in 1919 and by 1925 the company controlled 40% of the U.S. market. In 1927, the company started developing the sulfur deposit associated with the Boling Dome in Wharton County, Texas. Besides building a plant in 1928, the company also built Newgulf, Texas for its employees. By 1958, the company had produced 50 million tons of sulfur, 38 per cent of all the sulfur produced by the Frasch process to that date. In the 1950s, Texas Gulf Sulphur Company used the Spindletop Hill site for salt-brine extraction.

The company entered the Mexican market in 1949, with its subsidiary Cia. Exploradora del Istmo, S.A. Headquarters were established in Coatzacoalcos in 1950, and production from their Nopalapa plant commenced in 1957. By 1958, Texas Gulf had produced 69,490,00 tons of sulfur, which was 53.7 percent of the total Frasch sulphur production from 1895 through 1957. The Texas Africa Exploration Company was a subsidiary of Texas Gulf that spent 1 million Ethiopian dollars holding a mineral exploration in Ethiopia between 1957 and 1959.

=== SEC case and sale (1960-1981) ===
In the early 1960s, the company prospected and developed what would become the Kidd Mine in Ontario, Canada. In late 1962 and early 1963, trades in the stock of the company before and immediately after the publication of estimates of the mine's potential value led to an investigation by the United States Securities and Exchange Commission.

The resulting opinion in SEC v. Texas Gulf Sulphur Co. was a landmark of the jurisprudence of insider trading in the United States. In 1971, S.E.C. v. Texas Gulf Sulphur became the first insider trading case to be litigated in federal courts in American history, making the beginning of disgorgement in S.E.C. cases. That year, the United States Court of Appeals for the Second Circuit in Manhattan upheld an order that Texas Gulf had to repay profits it earned as a result of insider trading, as "remedial relief" but not a penalty assessment by the S.E.C. By 2017, the case was still used as a precedent on the federal level, with the S.E.C. continuing to frequently seek disgorgement as a remedy for insider trading. According to the New York Times, the case made disgorgement "the basis for the enforcement of the securities laws since 1971." The case involved members of the company purchasing stock in relation to a silver ore discovery before members of the public.

Kidd Mine, then owned by Texas Gulf Sulphur, went into production in 1966 as an open pit mine. Production later migrated underground, and after it was sold, by 2021, it had become the deepest base metal mine in the world.

In April 1972, the company became TexasGulf. In 1981 the company was acquired by Elf Aquitaine.

== See also ==
- Frasch process
- Insider trading court decisions
- List of largest mergers and acquisitions of the 1980s
