= Henderson v. Morgan =

- Supreme Court of the United States

Decided June 17, 1976
- Full case name: Henderson v. Morgan
- Citations: 426 U.S. 637 (more)

Holding
- A guilty plea is not voluntary when the criminal defendant is not aware of all elements of the charge.

Court membership
- Chief Justice Warren E. Burger Associate Justices William J. Brennan Jr. · Potter Stewart; Byron White · Thurgood Marshall; Harry Blackmun · Lewis F. Powell Jr. William Rehnquist · John P. Stevens

Case opinions
- Majority: Stevens
- Concurrence: White, joined by Stewart, Blackmun, Powell
- Dissent: Rehnquist, joined by Burger

Henderson v. Morgan, 426 U.S. 637 (1976), was a United States Supreme Court case in which the court held that a guilty plea is not voluntary when the criminal defendant is not aware of all elements of the charge. In this case, a defendant did not understand that pleading to second-degree murder constituted an admission that they had intended to kill the victim. Because they did not understand the requisite intent element, the guilty plea was not voluntary.

== Background ==
Morgan was indicated for first-degree murder, but, by agreement with the prosecution and on counsel's advice, Morgan pleaded guilty to second-degree murder and was sentenced. Subsequently, after exhausting his state remedies in an unsuccessful attempt to have his conviction vacated on the ground that his guilty plea was involuntary, respondent filed a habeas corpus petition in a federal district court. Morgan alleged that his guilty plea was involuntary because, among other things, he was not aware that intent to cause death was an element of second-degree murder.

The district court ultimately heard the testimony of several witnesses, including Morgan and his defense counsel in the original prosecution; and the transcript of the relevant state-court proceedings and certain psychological evaluations of Morgan, who was substantially below average intelligence, were made part of the record. On the basis of the evidence thus developed, the district court found that respondent had not been advised by counsel or the state court that an intent to cause death was an essential element of second-degree murder, and, based on this finding, held that the guilty plea was involuntary, and had to be set aside. The Second Circuit Court of Appeals affirmed.

== Opinion of the court ==
The Supreme Court issued an opinion on June 17, 1976.
