= Simon v. Eastern Kentucky Welfare Rights Organization =

- Supreme Court of the United States

Argued December 10, 1975 Decided June 1, 1976
- Full case name: William E. Simon, Secretary of the Treasury, et al., Petitioners, v. Eastern Kentucky Welfare Rights Organization et al.
- Citations: 426 U.S. 26 (more) 96 S. Ct. 1917, 48 L.Ed.2d 450
- Argument: Oral argument

Case history
- Prior: Eastern Kentucky Welfare Rights Organization v. Simon, 506 F.2d 1278 (D.C. Cir. 1974)

Holding
- The District Court should have granted petitioners' motion to dismiss because respondents failed to establish their standing to bring this suit.

Court membership
- Chief Justice Warren E. Burger Associate Justices William J. Brennan Jr. · Potter Stewart; Byron White · Thurgood Marshall; Harry Blackmun · Lewis F. Powell Jr. William Rehnquist · John P. Stevens

Case opinions
- Majority: Powell, joined by Burger, Stewart, White, Blackmun, Rehnquist
- Concurrence: Stewart
- Concurrence: Brennan (in judgment), joined by Marshall
- Stevens took no part in the consideration or decision of the case.

Simon v. Eastern Kentucky Welfare Rights Organization, 426 U.S. 26 (1976), was a United States Supreme Court case decided in 1976. In a majority opinion authored by Justice Lewis F. Powell, Jr., the Court held that the Eastern Kentucky Welfare Rights Organization and other respondents did not have Article III standing to challenge a specific revenue ruling issued by the Internal Revenue Service (IRS). The revenue ruling had extended favorable treatment to hospitals that limited the availability of non-emergency treatment to indigent patients.

Multiple indigent individuals and organizations representing those individuals, including the Eastern Kentucky Welfare Rights Organization, filed a lawsuit challenging the revenue ruling on the grounds that it violated the Administrative Procedure Act and was inconsistent with the Internal Revenue Code of 1954. The organizations and individuals had claimed to have standing because the policy encouraged hospitals to deny care to indigent patients, but the Supreme Court dismissed this idea as "purely speculative" and insufficient to establish standing.

Gene Nichol argued in a 1980 article that Eastern Kentucky, along with the Court's decision in Warth v. Seldin (1975), reflected "both a preoccupation with specific pleading and a potential hostility toward inferences of indirect causation of injury". Nichol also wrote that Eastern Kentucky's requirement for plaintiffs "to plead with specificity the effects of a tax ruling on particular hospitals in order to withstand a motion to dismiss, effectively sounds a death knell to such actions."
