= Donna M. Nagy =

American law professor

Donna M. Nagy is executive associate dean and C. Ben Dutton Professor of Law at the Indiana University Maurer School of Law in Bloomington, Indiana. Nagy is a 1986 graduate of Vassar College, where she was elected to Phi Beta Kappa. She earned her J.D. from New York University Law School in 1989. Nagy was articles editor of New York University Law Review and elected to the Order of the Coif.

Nagy began her began her career as a securities enforcement and litigation associate with Debevoise & Plimpton in Washington, D.C. She joined the University of Cincinnati College of Law faculty in 1994, and joined the Maurer School of Law faculty in 2006; she was named interim executive associate dean for academic affairs in August 2013 and executive associate dean in January 2014.

Nagy teaches and writes in the areas of securities litigation, securities regulation, and corporations. She is a member of the American Law Institute and has held many leadership positions with the Association of American Law Schools.

== Selected works ==
=== Books ===
- Securities Litigation And Enforcement: Cases And Materials, 4th Edition (with Richard W. Painter and Margaret V. Sachs) (West Publishing 2017; previous editions in 2003, 2008, 2012) and accompanying Annual Summer Supplements and Teacher's Manuals (ISBN 978-1-68328-165-8).
- Securities Litigation And Enforcement In A Nutshell (with Margaret V. Sachs and Gerald Russello) (West Publishing 2016)(ISBN 978-0-314-28769-4 (pb.), ISBN 978-1-63460-628-8 (ebook)).
- Ferrara On Insider Trading And The Wall (with Ralph C. Ferrara and Herbert Thomas) (Law Journal Seminars-Press 2002) (with semi-annual updates for loose-leaf edition).

=== Articles ===
- "Beyond Dirks: Gratuitous Tipping and Insider Trading," 42 J. Corp. Law 1-57 (2016)
- "Salman v. United States: Insider Trading’s Tipping Point," 69 Stanford. L. Rev. Online 28-36 (2016)
- "The Costs of Mandatory Cost-Benefit Analysis in SEC Rulemaking", 57 Ariz. L. Rev. 129-160 (2015)
- "Plugging Leaks and Lowering Levees in the Federal Government: Practical Solutions for Securities Trading Based on Political Intelligence," 2014 Ill. L. Rev. 1521-1572 (2014) (co-authored with Richard Painter)
- "Owning Stock While Making Law: An Agency Problem and a Fiduciary Solution," 48 Wake Forest L. Rev. 567-623 (2013)
