= Realty Income =

U.S. real estate investment trust

- Type: Public company
- Traded as: NYSE: O S&P 500 Index component
- Industry: Real estate investment trust
- Founded: 1969; 57 years ago
- Founder: William E. Clark, Jr. Evelyn J. Clark
- Headquarters: San Diego, California
- Key people: Michael D. McKee, Chairman; Sumit Roy, CEO; Jonathan Pong, CFO
- Products: Free-standing, single-tenant commercial properties
- Revenue: ▲US$5.75 billion (2025)
- Net income: ▲US$1.06 billion (2025)
- Total assets: ▲US$72.8 billion (2025)
- Total equity: ▲US$39.4 billion (2025)
- Number of employees: 418 (2023)
- Website: realtyincome.com

Realty Income Corporation is a real estate investment trust that invests in free-standing, single-tenant commercial properties in the United States, the United Kingdom, and six other countries in Europe. These properties are subject to NNN Leases. The company is organized in Maryland with its headquarters in San Diego, California.

The company is one of a few real estate investment trusts that pays dividends monthly, rather than quarterly, and has registered a trademark for the phrase "The Monthly Dividend Company".

== Investments ==
As of June 30, 2024, the company owned 15,450 properties totaling approximately 335.3 million leasable square feet.

The company's largest tenants are as follows:

Rank	Tenant	% of Total Portfolio Annualized Contractual Rent
1	Dollar General	3.4%
2	Walgreens	3.3%
3	Dollar Tree / Family Dollar	3.1%
4	7-Eleven	2.6%
5	EG Group	2.2%
6	Wynn Resorts	2.1%
7	Life Time Fitness	2.0%
8	FedEx	2.0%
9	BJ's Wholesale Club	1.6%
10	(B&Q) Kingfisher	1.6%

== History ==
Realty Income Corporation was founded in 1969 by William E. Clark and Evelyn J. Clark. Its first acquisition was a Taco Bell restaurant in early 1970. The company used cash to purchase land needed for stores that required real estate to run, and then leased the property to the stores long term. In 1994, the company became a public company via an initial public offering. In 1997, William E. Clark, Jr., retired as CEO and was succeeded by Thomas A. Lewis. In 2013, John P. Case succeeded Mr. Lewis as CEO of the company.

In 2009, Clark retired as chairman. In 2013, the company acquired American Realty Capital Trust, founded by Nicholas Schorsch, in a $2.95 billion transaction. In 2015, the company was added to the S&P 500 and the S&P High Yield Dividend Aristocrats index. In 2018, Sumit Roy became the company's CEO. In 2019, the company completed a sale-leaseback transaction for 12 properties of the United Kingdom supermarket chain Sainsbury's. This was the company's first purchase of property outside the United States.

On November 1, 2021, the company acquired VEREIT. On December 1, 2022, the company completed a $1.7 billion sale-leaseback of Encore Boston Harbor. On August 2, 2023, the company announced a $950 million investment in Bellagio Las Vegas. On January 23, 2024, the company completed the $9.3 billion acquisition of Spirit Realty Capital.

In November 2025, it was announced the company had acquired The Lexicon shopping centre in Bracknell, UK for approximately £150m.
