= Salman v. United States =

- Supreme Court of the United States

Argued October 5, 2016 Decided December 6, 2016
- Full case name: Bassam Yacoub Salman, Petitioner v. United States
- Docket no.: 15-628
- Citations: 580 U.S. 39 (more) 137 S. Ct. 420; 196 L. Ed. 2d 351
- Opinion announcement: Opinion announcement

Case history
- Prior: Conviction affirmed, 792 F.3d 1087 (9th Cir. 2015)

Holding
- Under Dirks, the jury could infer that the tipper here personally benefited from making a gift of confidential information to a trading relative.

Court membership
- Chief Justice John Roberts Associate Justices Anthony Kennedy · Clarence Thomas; Ruth Bader Ginsburg · Stephen Breyer; Samuel Alito · Sonia Sotomayor; Elena Kagan

Case opinion
- Majority: Alito, joined by unanimous

Laws applied
- Securities Exchange Act of 1934

Salman v. United States, 580 U.S. 39 (2016), was a United States Supreme Court case in which the Court held that gifts of confidential information without any compensation to relatives for the purposes of insider trading are a violation of securities laws. The Court relied on its decision in Dirks v. Securities and Exchange Commission, 463 U.S. 646 (1983), which held that "that a tippee is exposed to liability for trading on inside information only if the tippee participates in a breach of the tipper's fiduciary duty."

== Background ==
A jury convicted Bassam Yacoub Salman of securities fraud and U.S. District Judge Edward M. Chen then denied Salman's motion for a new trial. On July 6, 2015, the United States Court of Appeals for the Ninth Circuit affirmed the conviction, in which Judge Jed S. Rakoff was joined by Judges Morgan Christen and Paul J. Watford.

On October 5, 2016, oral arguments were heard, where Deputy Solicitor General Michael Dreeben appeared for the government.

== Opinion of the Court ==
On December 6, 2016, the Supreme Court delivered judgment in favor of the government, voting unanimously to affirm the lower court. Justice Samuel Alito authored the opinion of the Court.
