= Richard Painter =

American lawyer

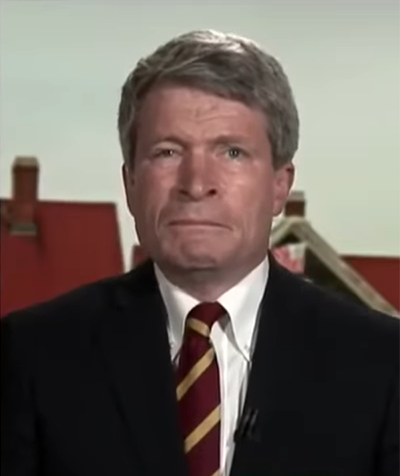
- Born: Richard William Painter; October 3, 1961 (age 64); Philadelphia, Pennsylvania, U.S.
- Education: Harvard University (BA); Yale University (JD)
- Political party: Forward (2022–present)
- Other political affiliations: Democratic (2018–2022) Republican (before 2018)
- Spouse: Karen Painter
- Children: 3
- Website: Campaign website

Richard William Painter (born October 3, 1961) is an American lawyer, professor, and political candidate. From 2005 to 2007 Painter was the chief White House ethics lawyer in the George W. Bush administration. He is the S. Walter Richey Professor of Corporate Law at the University of Minnesota, and since 2016 has been vice-chair of Citizens for Responsibility and Ethics in Washington (CREW), a government watchdog group.

A longtime Republican and self-described centrist, Painter announced that he would be a candidate for the Democratic–Farmer–Labor Party endorsement in the 2022 Minnesota 1st congressional district special election to fill a vacancy caused by the death of Rep. Jim Hagedorn. Painter finished in a distant third in the primary, losing the nomination to businessman Jeffrey Ettinger, who ultimately lost the special election.

Painter previously ran for the 2018 Minnesota Democratic–Farmer–Labor Party nomination for U.S. Senate, losing to recently appointed Senator Tina Smith in a primary.

Painter has been affiliated with the Campaign Legal Center, a group that is a frequent critic of the Trump administration. Throughout 2017 he was involved in the CREW lawsuit against Trump, CREW v. Trump. In March 2020, his book coauthored with Peter Golenbock, American Nero: The History of the Destruction of the Rule of Law, and Why Trump Is the Worst Offender, appeared.

== Early life and education ==
Painter was born in Philadelphia, Pennsylvania, in 1961. He was raised outside Philadelphia, in Kansas City, Kansas, and in Champaign, Illinois. He graduated from St. George's School, Rhode Island.

Painter received his B.A. in history summa cum laude from Harvard University and his Juris Doctor from Yale Law School, where he was an editor of the Yale Journal on Regulation. At Harvard, Painter became politically active, speaking out against President Reagan's decision to send aid to the right-wing government in El Salvador and founding the Harvard Radcliffe Democratic Club newspaper Perspective. In 1982 he made his first appearance on national television during an episode of Firing Line with Reagan in which he called out Reagan's "reckless deficit spending and cuts to social programs". During the 1984 presidential election Painter was the chair of Harvard Students for Walter Mondale.

== Career ==
Painter was a law clerk to Judge John T. Noonan Jr. of the United States Court of Appeals for the Ninth Circuit. He then worked at the law firms of Sullivan & Cromwell in New York and Finn Dixon & Herling in Stamford, Connecticut.

Painter was the Guy Raymond and Mildred Van Voorhis Jones Professor of Law at the University of Illinois College of Law from 2002 to 2005 and the chief White House ethics lawyer in the George W. Bush administration from 2005 to 2007. Upon leaving the White House, he returned to teaching, at the University of Minnesota Law School.

Painter has been a member of the American Law Institute since 2004. In March 2016 he wrote in The New York Times that if George W. Bush had had the opportunity to appoint a Supreme Court justice during his last two years in office, with a Democratic-majority Senate, Bush would have chosen Merrick Garland, who was ultimately nominated by Barack Obama on March 16, 2016, as a consensus nominee. William K. Kelley, who was deputy counsel to Bush from 2005 to 2007, disagreed that Bush might have nominated Garland under such circumstances.

In December 2016, Painter replaced David Brock as vice-chair of Citizens for Responsibility and Ethics in Washington (CREW). As of May 2017 he is the S. Walter Richey Professor of Corporate Law at the University of Minnesota Law School.

=== Collusion between the Trump campaign and Russians ===
In May 2017 Painter compared the Trump administration with Nixon's scandals, saying, "Nixon may have been a crook, but at least he was our crook. He wasn't a Russian agent!" In 2018 he said, “We know there was collusion.” In early 2019 Painter told German newspaper Deutsche Welle that the indictment of Roger Stone was "evidence of collusion between high-ranking officials in the Trump campaign and WikiLeaks to obtain documents stolen by the Russians in the 2016 election."

=== Emolument Clause lawsuit against Donald Trump ===
In January 2017, CREW sued President Donald Trump for failing to sell off certain assets and place others in a blind trust. Painter said, "If Obama had tried that, we would have impeached him in two weeks." CREW alleged that certain foreign payments Trump received violated the U.S. Constitution's emoluments clause. The district court dismissed the case, holding that the plaintiffs lacked standing; On January 25, 2021, the U.S. Supreme Court instructed the lower courts to dismiss the case as moot because Trump had left office.

=== 2018 U.S. Senate campaign ===
Painter was a longtime Republican, saying in 2017: "I've been a Republican for 30 years. There's no way that I would want to see the Republican Party stand up for covering up for Russian espionage and whoever in the United States has been helping the Russians. It's going to be a disaster for the Republicans. It's going to be a disaster for our country." In criticizing Trump and his administration, Painter said, "We are well past the point where we were in 1973 (Watergate) with respect to clear evidence of abuse of power, obstruction of justice, and other illegal activities."

In March 2018 Painter announced that he was forming an exploratory committee to run for U.S. Senate in Minnesota, saying he was unsure whether he would seek office as a Republican, Democrat, or independent. In April 2018 he announced that he would run as a Democratic (Minnesota DFL) candidate in the primary against the incumbent Senator Tina Smith. Painter finished a distant second, with 14% of the vote to Smith's 76%.

=== 2022 U.S. House campaign ===
In February 2022, Painter announced his candidacy for the U.S. House of Representatives in Minnesota's 1st congressional district. The seat became vacant after the death of Jim Hagedorn. In May 2022, Painter lost the DFL primary, placing third behind Sarah Brakebill-Hacke and Jeff Ettinger.

== Political positions ==
Painter describes himself as a centrist, and has criticized the Republican Party's move to the right since 1980. He said he would not accept the support of political action committees, super PACs, or "dark money" organizations. He supports major investments in transportation and other infrastructure projects, and is critical of stadium subsidies. Painter also declared his opposition to the Trump tariffs, in particular those on steel and aluminum.

Painter favors legalizing recreational marijuana and ending the federal ban on marijuana. He is critical of the National Rifle Association of America, calling it a "protection racket" and favors "a license-and-registration system similar to what we have for cars."

=== Ethics reform ===
To confront corruption in Washington, Painter proposed what he calls the "strongest ethics reform package in United States history":

- Apply 18 U.S.C § 208, a previously existing criminal statute that prohibits all unelected federal executive branch officers from participating in any matter with which they or a spouse have a personal financial conflict of interest, to the President, Vice President, and all members of the House and Senate.
- Require the President and all members of the House and Senate to divest from individual companies’ stocks, bonds and other securities that create conflicts of interest, and instead invest in broadly diversified stock mutual funds, life insurance, bank accounts, and other conflict-free assets as defined in already existing Office of Government Ethics regulations.
- Expand the post-government-employment ban in 18 U.S.C § 207 to include a lifetime ban on former members of the House and Senate working as paid lobbyists, and provide that violating this ban will result in criminal penalties.
- Impose term limits (six years in the House, twelve years in the Senate) for Congressional leadership positions and committee chairmanships, and dismantle the seniority system that gives more power to long-serving members.
- Strip pensions of any official found guilty of violating any federal anti-corruption statute, including but not limited to 18 U.S.C §§ 207 and 208, bribery and gratuity statutes, insider trading laws, and other similar provisions.
- Impose criminal penalties on any U.S. government official who receives profits and benefits from foreign governments in violation of the Emoluments Clause of the Constitution, and mandate that the Department of Justice investigate and prosecute persons violating this prohibition.

=== Healthcare ===
Painter believes that the United States ought to support the health care system that is the most efficient and comprehensive, which he believes to be a single-payer system. He supports Bernie Sanders's Medicare-for-All bill

=== Environment ===
Painter rejected the Trump administration's approach to carbon emissions and departure from the Paris Agreement. He believes that human-caused climate change is an existential threat to human life, and wants to make various political changes to try to prevent it, including:

- Implementing a carbon tax
- Removing climate change deniers from office
- Reentering the Paris Agreement

=== Copper/nickel mining ===
The Boundary Waters Canoe Area Wilderness comprises nearly one million acres of pristine Minnesota lakes, forests, and wildlife. It also contains vast quantities of metals such as copper and nickel that foreign entities are trying to mine by an extremely dangerous method: sulfide mining.

Painter often points out that copper/nickel mining has serious environmental consequences. The Minnesota Department of Natural Resources is a political office, and Painter believes Minnesotans have little reason to be confident in their ability to protect Minnesota from these consequences. The legal framework governing these kinds of mines was designed to regulate taconite extraction and does not properly address sulfide mining. Additionally, Glencore's chairman, Tony Hayward, former chairman of British Petroleum during the Deepwater Horizon oil spill, gives Painter reason to question the company's commitment to safety and environmental-consciousness.

For these reasons Painter vehemently opposes H.R. 3115, a bill that passed the U.S. House in early December 2017 to push through a land swap needed for the completion of the PolyMet mine, and the "Smith Amendment," a rider added to the National Defense Authorization Act that was designed to be parallel legislation to H.R. 3115 introduced in the U.S. Senate. Enacting this legislation will void four pending lawsuits on the matter, preventing Minnesotans from questioning the legality of the land swap and eliminating the judicial branch's role.

Painter also opposes the MINER Act (H.R. 3905), which would prevent the completion of a two-year Forest Service study related to economic and environmental issues associated with mining near the Boundary Waters. This act would allow PolyMet to begin mining before all the questions surrounding the sulfide mines are answered fully. Painter believes that Minnesotans have a right to know the kind of damage these mines will do to our rivers, lakes, and ecosystems before the monied interests in Washington push them through. The MINER Act also designates Minnesota as the only state in the nation unworthy of public lands protections, requiring Congressional intervention into decisions regarding public lands in Minnesota.

=== Clean energy ===
Painter has said, "Donald Trump's promise to bring coal mining back to the U.S. is disingenuous. We need to move forward and expand the creation of clean jobs across the state." He supports creating these jobs by expanding tax credits that can help grow solar energy farms across Minnesota. Painter believes that investing in clean energy will increase jobs in all areas of processing, such as installation, manufacturing, sales and distribution, and project development.

Painter also advocates fair trade and free trade trade policies in order to protect American jobs while promoting clean energy investment. He has criticized the Trump tariffs, saying that, while using American resources is important to the economy, he believes that these tariffs will only increase the prices of goods while propping up a sector of unsustainable jobs.

=== Election reform ===
If elected, Painter promised to take the following steps to eliminate the corrupting influence of money in politics, which he believes is legalized bribery.

- Introduce a bill requiring complete transparency about money in politics, including contributions to 501(c)(3) organizations, 501(c)(4) organizations, PACs, Super PACs, and any dark-money organizations engaging in communications intended to influence elections. All such contributions will be recorded by the FEC and made publicly available.
- Enact a "Taxation Only With Representation" statute giving every taxpayer the right to designate the first $200 of their taxes to the campaign(s) of their choice.
- Vote against the appointment of any Supreme Court nominee who will not, under oath, commit to overturning FEC vs. Citizens United.
- Provide funding to state legislatures to organize and sponsor televised debates for both the primary and general election for all federal and statewide offices, as well as any other offices at the discretion of the legislature.

== Personal life ==
Painter's wife, Karen Painter, is a professor of music history at the University of Minnesota. They have three children, and have lived in Minnesota since 2007.

In July 2015 Painter was diagnosed with shingles and Ramsay Hunt syndrome type 2, which left the right side of his face partially paralyzed.

== Selected publications ==
- Getting the Government America Deserves: How Ethics Reform Can Make a Difference (Oxford University Press 2009)
- Professional and Personal Responsibilities of the Lawyer (with Judge John T. Noonan Jr.; Foundation 1997; Second Edition, 2001; Third Edition 2011)
- Securities Litigation and Enforcement (with Margaret Sachs and Donna Nagy; West 2003; Second Edition, 2007; Third Edition 2011).

== See also ==
- United States Office of Government Ethics
