= William Kahane =

American businessman

- Born: William Monroe Kahane; 1948 (age 77–78)
- Education: Occidental College; Stanford Graduate School of Business; UCLA School of Law
- Spouse: Elizabeth Ann Kahane
- Parents: Harold Kahane (father); Audrey P. Kahane (mother)

William Monroe Kahane (born 1948) is an American businessman and philanthropist. He specializes in real estate finance. He is the co-founder of the real estate finance firm AR Global.

== Early life and education ==
William Kahane is a son of Audrey P. Kahane and Harold Kahane. His mother counseled women who were giving up their children for adoption, his father was a sales representative for the Royal Metal Corporation. Kahane received a BA from Occidental College, an MBA from the Stanford Graduate School of Business, and a JD from the UCLA School of Law.

== Early career ==
Kahane has been active in real estate, specifically the structuring and financial management of commercial real estate investments, for over 40 years. He began his career in 1974 as a real estate lawyer, practicing in the public and private sectors. From 1981 to 1992, he worked at Morgan Stanley & Co., where he specialized in real estate and became a managing director. While at Morgan Stanley, he oversaw real estate investment banking activities in Tokyo, where he advised on several high-profile transactions, including the sale of the Regent Hotel Chain to Four Seasons in 1992. He left Morgan Stanley to establish a real estate advisory and asset sales business known as Milestone Partners. From 1997 until 2005, Mr. Kahane was on the Board of Directors of Catellus Development Corp, and served as Non-Executive Chairman from 1999 to 2001.

== American Realty Capital ==
In 2006, Kahane co-founded American Realty Capital Advisors, an investment manager that sponsored traded and non-traded real estate investment trusts (REITs). The company, which was later renamed AR Capital (ARC), raised up to $12.8 billion of equity for nine REITs that were launched as vehicles whose shares would not be traded on any public exchange, as well as the publicly listed American Realty Capital Properties, which was later re-branded as VEREIT.

After the founding of AR Capital, Kahane held key board positions for many of the companies sponsored by or affiliated with ARC (e.g., American Realty Capital - Retail Centers of America, American Realty Capital Hospitality Trust, AR Capital Acquisition Corp.). After 2015 Kahane scaled back his involvement in some of these firms, and SEC filings suggested that as of late 2017 he was no longer a Director in any.

== Philanthropy ==
William Kahane and his wife, Elizabeth Ann Kahane, have been recognized for their philanthropy and dedication to the support of the following academic institutions, charitable causes, and foundations:

- Occidental College: In 2014, the Kahane's were listed among New York City's top 40 Philanthropists for their $5.5 million donation to Occidental College, establishing a permanent endowment for the "William and Elizabeth Kahane Occidental at the United Nations Program" which takes qualified seniors from Occidental and sends them to NYC while the United Nations General Assembly is in session. Students take two courses in international issues and an independent study seminar while also interning full-time at a UN-related agency. Kahane has also served as a Trustee of Occidental College.
- AHRC New York City: In 2014, Kahane and an ARC co-founder were presented "Corporate Hero" awards for their philanthropic efforts to AHRC NYC. After receiving the award at the 34th annual Thurman Munson Awards Dinner, they donated an additional $200,000.
- Audrain Automobile Museum: Kahane is a co-founder of the Audrain Automobile Museum, a Museum created with a goal of preserving automobiles with historical significance to Newport, RI.
- Central Park Conservancy: From 2010 to 2016 the Kahane's were in the Central Park Conservancy's Annual Reports as donors at levels as high as the $25,000-$49,999 level. They have also bought a Conservator Table at the Fredrick Law Olmstead Awards Luncheon multiple times.
- Metropolitan Opera of New York City: The Kahane's were Sponsors of the 2017 Metropolitan Opera Gala.
- Congregation Emanu-El: Kahane was nominated to the board of trustees at Congregation Emanu-El in 2008. He had joined Emanu-El in 1998, was married there in 1999, and has served as an Emanu-El usher and as a member of the Readers Panel.
- The Preservation Society of Newport County: The Newport Gazette, a publication of the Preservation Society of Newport County, notes that donations from the Kahane's were used to permanently acquire two marble busts for the Society. The Society also lists the Kahane's as donors at the $50,000-$99,999 level in the 2014-2015 period.
- Newport Historical Society: The Kahane's have been Presenting Sponsors and Founders of the Newport Antiques Show as well as contributors to the Society's annual fund in 2015–2016.
- Newport Hospital: The Kahane's were sponsors of the Newport Hospital's 2017 Summer Soiree which raised over $700,000 for the hospital.
- IYRS School of Technology and Trades: Kahane serves on the IYRS Board of Trustees and the Kahane's were Supporter Level donors to the IYRS School of Technology Annual Gala that took place July 8, 2017.
- Oliver Hazard Perry Rhode Island: This organization, which provides education-at-sea programs, lists the Kahane's as donors credited with assisting in the construction of a $16 million ship.
- Redwood Library & Athenaeum: From 2014 to 2017 the Kahanes were listed by the Redwood Library as donors at levels as high as $10,000-$24,999.
