= List of United States Supreme Court cases, volume 426 =

This is a list of all the United States Supreme Court cases from volume 426 of the United States Reports:

Case name	Citation	Date decided
Train v. Colo. Pub. Interest Research Group, Inc.	426 U.S. 1	1976
Simon v. E. Ky. Welfare Rights Org.	426 U.S. 26	1976
Mathews v. Diaz	426 U.S. 67	1976
Hampton v. Mow Sun Wong	426 U.S. 88	1976
Overriding national interests may permit federal legislation that would be impermissible for a state government under the Equal Protection Clause.
Cappaert v. United States	426 U.S. 128	1976
Radzanower v. Touche Ross & Co.	426 U.S. 148	1976
Hancock v. Train	426 U.S. 167	1976
EPA v. California ex rel. State Water Resources Control Bd.	426 U.S. 200	1976
Washington v. Davis	426 U.S. 229	1976
FPC v. Conway Corp.	426 U.S. 271	1976
Charlotte v. Firefighters	426 U.S. 283	1976
Nader v. Allegheny Airlines, Inc.	426 U.S. 290	1976
Omaha Nat'l Bank v. Nebraskans for Indep. Banking, Inc.	426 U.S. 310	1976
Tennessee v. Dunlap	426 U.S. 312	1976
United States v. MacCollom	426 U.S. 317	1976
Bishop v. Wood	426 U.S. 341	1976
New Hampshire v. Maine	426 U.S. 363	1976
Bryan v. Itasca Cnty.	426 U.S. 373	1976
Kerr v. N.D. Cal.	426 U.S. 394	1976
Oil Workers v. Mobil Oil Corp.	426 U.S. 407	1976
TSC Industries, Inc. v. Northway, Inc.	426 U.S. 438	1976
Texas v. Louisiana	426 U.S. 465	1976
Burrell v. McCray	426 U.S. 471	1976
Ralston Purina Co. v. Louisville & N.R.R. Co.	426 U.S. 476	1976
Mass. Mut. Ins. Co. v. Ludwig	426 U.S. 479	1976
Hortonville Joint Sch. Dist. v. Hortonville Ed. Ass'n	426 U.S. 482	1976
United States v. Ches. & Ohio R. Co.	426 U.S. 500	1976
Kleppe v. New Mexico	426 U.S. 529	1976
Fed. Energy Admin. v. Algonquin SNG, Inc.	426 U.S. 548	1976
Examining Bd. v. Flores de Otero	426 U.S. 572	1976
Doyle v. Ohio	426 U.S. 610	1976
Henderson v. Morgan	426 U.S. 637	1976
Pennsylvania v. New Jersey	426 U.S. 660	1976
Eastlake v. Forest City Enterprises, Inc.	426 U.S. 668	1976
Serbian Eastern Orthodox Diocese for United States and Canada v. Milivojevich	426 U.S. 696	1976
Roemer v. Bd. of Public Works	426 U.S. 736	1976
Flint Ridge Development Co. v. Scenic Rivers Ass'n	426 U.S. 776	1976
Hughes v. Alexandria Scrap Corp.	426 U.S. 794	1976
Nat'l League of Cities v. Usery	426 U.S. 833	1976
