= TSC Industries, Inc. v. Northway, Inc. =

- Supreme Court of the United States

Argued March 3, 1976 Decided June 14, 1976
- Full case name: TSC Industries, Incorporated, et al. v. Northway, Incorporated
- Citations: 426 U.S. 438 (more) 96 S. Ct. 2126; 48 L. Ed. 2d 757; 1976 U.S. LEXIS 155; Fed. Sec. L. Rep. (CCH) ¶ 95,615

Case history
- Prior: Plaintiffs' motion for partial summary judgment on liability denied, 361 F. Supp. 108 (N.D. Ill. 1973), affirmed in part, reversed in part, 512 F.2d 324; cert. granted, 423 U.S. 820 (1975).

Holding
- A misstated or omitted fact in a proxy solicitation is material if there is a substantial likelihood that a reasonable shareholder would consider it important in deciding how to vote.

Court membership
- Chief Justice Warren E. Burger Associate Justices William J. Brennan Jr. · Potter Stewart; Byron White · Thurgood Marshall; Harry Blackmun · Lewis F. Powell Jr. William Rehnquist · John P. Stevens

Case opinion
- Majority: Marshall, joined by Burger, Brennan, Stewart, White, Blackmun, Powell, Rehnquist
- Stevens took no part in the consideration or decision of the case.

Laws applied
- Securities Exchange Act of 1934

TSC Industries, Inc. v. Northway, Inc., 426 U.S. 438 (1976), was a case in which the Supreme Court of the United States articulated the requirement of materiality in securities fraud cases.

== Facts and procedural history ==
National Industries, Inc. sought to acquire TSC Industries, Inc., and had purchased 34% of TSC's voting stock from the corporation’s founder. Five nominees from National were placed on TSC's board of directors. TSC's board voted on October 16, 1969 (with National's members abstaining) to liquidate and sell the assets of TSC to National. One aspect of the proposed merger was to exchange both common and preferred in TSC for that of National. TSC and National then issued a joint proxy statement to their shareholders to approve the merger. The shareholders approved and the plan was carried out.

Plaintiff Northway, Inc. was a TSC shareholder who brought suit against both TSC and National, alleging that the proxy statement was incomplete and materially misleading and therefore violated §14(a) of the Securities Exchange Act of 1934, 15 U.S.C. § 78n, and Rules 14a-3 and 14a-9 promulgated thereunder by the United States Securities and Exchange Commission. Northway asserted that the proxy statement was misleading because National had omitted facts concerning the degree of control it had over TSC, and misrepresented whether or not the merger was a good deal for TSC shareholders. The United States District Court for the Northern District of Illinois denied Northway's motion for summary judgment. The Court of Appeals for the Seventh Circuit agreed with the District Court that there existed a genuine issue of fact as to whether National's acquisition of the Schmidt interests in TSC had resulted in a change of control, and that summary judgment was therefore inappropriate on the Rule 14a-3 claim. But the Court of Appeals reversed the District Court's denial of summary judgment to Northway on its Rule 14a-9 claims, holding that certain omissions of fact were material as a matter of law. 512 F.2d 324 (1975). The U.S. Supreme Court then granted certiorari.

== Decision ==
Justice Marshall, writing for the majority, first examined the underlying policy behind the §14a of the Securities Exchange Act. Stockholders need to understand the questions they are voting on, and misstatements or omissions in proxy materials prevent them from properly doing so. The court had previously held that a defect in a proxy statement need not be decisive in the actual vote: so long as the misstatement or omission was material, there was a causal link between violation of the law and the injury to the shareholder.

=== Previous standards of materiality ===
Marshall then examined the various standards of materiality which had been used by lower courts. The Seventh Circuit used the test of “all facts which a reasonable shareholder might consider important”, which Marshall held was not a stringent enough test. The Second and Fifth circuits used a more conventional tort-based test: whether a reasonable person would attach importance to the fact which was misrepresented or omitted in determining his course of action.

=== Marshall's new formulation of materiality ===
Marshall wanted the test for materiality of a misstatement or omission to serve the remedial purposes of §14a, without creating too much liability for companies by allowing any minor or trivial defect to create liability. If the test was too stringent, it would cause the dismissal of otherwise meritorious lawsuits; if it were too lenient, corporate officers would be inclined to overwhelm shareholders with such a large volume of information that truly valuable facts might escape them. He formulated the test as follows: an omitted fact is material if there is a substantial likelihood that a reasonable shareholder would consider it important in deciding how to vote. In other words, the court must determine whether under all the circumstances, the omitted fact would have assumed actual significance in the decision of the shareholder. Thus, materiality is a mixed question of fact and law.

=== Application of the new rule to the facts of the case ===
The two facts that National omitted with respect to the proxy solicitation were the fact that National's chief executive officer was chairman of TSC's board of directors, and that National had previously indicated to the SEC that it was the parent company of TSC. Marshall held that these omissions were of questionable materiality and inappropriate for summary judgment because other disclosures within the proxy materials could have led shareholders to similar conclusions about the degree of control National exercised over TSC. Furthermore, there was already a genuine issue of fact as to whether National was really in control of TSC at the time of the proxy solicitation anyway.

The two facts which National omitted with respect to the fairness of the transaction were the statements of an investment banking firm involved in the deal and the purchase of National's stock by a mutual fund. The investment bank rendered an opinion that the high redemption price of National's stock was a substantial premium over the current market value of TSC's shares. The bank later revised its opinion when it discovered that the warrants for National stock were being offered at a lower price than expected. But since the bank still felt the transaction was fair and that TSC shareholders were still receiving a premium, Marshall held this omission to be immaterial.

Northway also accused National of collusion to manipulate market prices by engaging in a series of transactions with Madison Fund, Inc., a mutual fund. One of National's directors also had a seat on Madison's board, and in the period prior to National's acquisition of TSC, Madison's purchases of National's common stock accounted for 8.5% of all reported transactions for the company's securities. But Northway failed to demonstrate evidence of any unlawful manipulation at trial, and Marshall found that National had no duty to disclose all information which might suggest market manipulation, but rather only to be honest in its disclosures. Marshall overturned the decision of the Court of Appeals and remanded the case.

== See also ==
- List of United States Supreme Court cases, volume 426
