= Title 17 of the Code of Federal Regulations =

U.S. federal rules and regulations on commodities and securities exchanges

CFR Title 17 – Commodity and Securities Exchanges is one of 50 titles composing the United States Code of Federal Regulations (CFR) and contains the principal set of rules and regulations issued by federal agencies regarding commodity and securities exchanges. It is available in digital and printed form and can be referenced online using the Electronic Code of Federal Regulations (e-CFR).

== Structure ==
The table of contents, as reflected in the e-CFR updated December 20, 2018, is as follows:

Volume	Chapter	Parts	Regulatory Entity
1	I	1-40	Commodity Futures Trading Commission
2	I	41-199	Commodity Futures Trading Commission
3	II	200-239	Securities and Exchange Commission
3	II	240-399	Securities and Exchange Commission
4	IV	400-450	Department of the Treasury

== See also ==
- Regulation CF appears in 17 CFR part 227.
- Regulation A appears in 17 CFR part 230.
