= Blue Chip Stamps v. Manor Drug Stores =

- Supreme Court of the United States

Argued March 24, 1975 Decided June 9, 1975
- Full case name: Blue Chip Stamps v. Manor Drug Stores
- Citations: 421 U.S. 723 (more) 95 S. Ct. 1917; 44 L. Ed. 2d 539

Case history
- Prior: Certiorari to the United States Court of Appeals for the Ninth Circuit

Holding
- A private damages action under Rule 10b-5 is confined to actual purchasers or sellers of securities and the Birnbaum rule bars respondent from maintaining this suit.

Court membership
- Chief Justice Warren E. Burger Associate Justices William O. Douglas · William J. Brennan Jr. Potter Stewart · Byron White; Thurgood Marshall · Harry Blackmun; Lewis F. Powell Jr. · William Rehnquist

Case opinions
- Majority: Rehnquist, joined by Burger, Stewart, White, Marshall, Powell
- Concurrence: Powell, joined by Stewart, Marshall
- Dissent: Blackmun, joined by Douglas, Brennan

Laws applied
- Securities Act of 1933, 48 Stat. 74, as amended, 15 U.S.C. 77a et seq.

Blue Chip Stamps v. Manor Drug Stores, 421 U.S. 723 (1975), was a decision by the United States Supreme Court, which ruled that only those suffering direct loss from the purchase or sale of stock had standing to sue under federal securities law. The Court noted that under the Securities Exchange Act of 1934, derivative investors are considered buyers or sellers of securities for application of SEC Rule 10b-5.

== See also ==
- List of United States Supreme Court cases, volume 421
