= Chiarella v. United States =

- Supreme Court of the United States

Argued November 5, 1979 Decided March 18, 1980
- Full case name: Chiarella v. United States
- Citations: 445 U.S. 222 (more) 100 S. Ct. 1108; 63 L. Ed. 2d 348

Case history
- Prior: United States v. Chiarella, 588 F.2d 1358 (2d Cir. 1978)

Holding
- Employee of printer handling corporate takeover bids who deduced target companies' identities and dealt in their stock without disclosing knowledge of impending takeovers had not violated 10(b) of the Securities Exchange Act of 1934 (15 U.S.C. § 78j(b)) and SEC Rule 10b-5.

Court membership
- Chief Justice Warren E. Burger Associate Justices William J. Brennan Jr. · Potter Stewart; Byron White · Thurgood Marshall; Harry Blackmun · Lewis F. Powell Jr. William Rehnquist · John P. Stevens

Case opinions
- Majority: Powell, joined by Stewart, White, Rehnquist, Stevens
- Concurrence: Stevens
- Concurrence: Brennan (in judgment)
- Dissent: Burger
- Dissent: Blackmun, joined by Marshall

Laws applied
- § 10(b) of the Securities Exchange Act of 1934 (15 U.S.C. § 78j(b)); SEC Rule 10b-5

Chiarella v. United States, 445 U.S. 222 (1980), is a case in which the Supreme Court of the United States held that an employee of a printer handling corporate takeover bids who deduced target companies' identities and dealt in their stock without disclosing his knowledge of impending takeovers, had not violated § 10(b) of the Securities Exchange Act of 1934 and SEC Rule 10b-5.

== Background ==
After working in a position that gave petitioner Vincent Chiarella inside information on particular corporate takeover bids, the Securities and Exchanges Commission (SEC) investigated his trading activities. Chiarella and the SEC allegedly came to an agreement where Chiarella "agreed to return the profits he made in the sellers of the shares." A short time after, he was indicted on seventeen counts of violating the Securities Exchange Act of 1934.

== Question before the Court ==
Did Chiaraella "violate Section 10(b) of the 1934 Act by failing to disclose the impending takeover before trading in the target company's securities?"

== Decision of the Court ==
In a 6–3 decision in favor of Chiarella, Justice Powell wrote the opinion of the Supreme Court. The Court held that "a duty to disclose under section 10(b) does not arise from the mere possession of nonpublic market information." Chiarella had no "fiduciary relationship" with either company, nor was he an agent of either company, Chiarella had no duty to disclose the privileged information, and he did not receive confidential information from the targeted companies.
