= VEREIT =

American REIT

VEREIT, Inc.
- Formerly: American Realty Capital Properties Inc., or ARCP
- ISIN: US92339V1008
- Industry: Real estate investment trust
- Founded: 2010; 15 years ago
- Founder: Nicholas Schorsch
- Defunct: November 1, 2021; 3 years ago
- Fate: Acquired by Realty Income
- Headquarters: Phoenix, Arizona, U.S.
- Key people: Glenn J. Rufrano, CEO; Michael J. Bartolotta, CFO
- Revenue: ▼US$1.161 billion (2020)
- Net income: ▲US$-201 million (2020)
- Total assets: ▲US$13.324 billion (2020)
- Total equity: ▼US$6.804 billion (2020)
- Number of employees: 160 (2020)

VEREIT, Inc. was a real estate investment trust headquartered in Phoenix, Arizona that invested in single-tenant retail, restaurant, office and industrial properties. As of December 31, 2020, the company owned 3,831 properties with an aggregate of 89.7 million square feet. The company was acquired by Realty Income in November 2021.

The company was formerly known as American Realty Capital Properties Inc. and it changed its name after an accounting scandal. Its name was derived for the Latin word "veritas", meaning truth.

== History ==
The company was founded in 2010 by Nicholas Schorsch.

In November 2013, the company acquired CapLease, adding 68 properties totaling over 13 million square feet.

In January 2014, the company acquired 120 properties from funds managed by Fortress Investment Group for $601.2 million.

In February 2014, the company acquired Cole Real Estate Investments, becoming the largest publicly traded net lease REIT. Cole was sold to CIM Group in February 2018.

In October 2014, the company admitted to a $23 million accounting error and fired chief financial officer Brian Block. Lawsuits alleged that insiders received over $900 million in fees from the company. In December 2014, Schorsch resigned as chairman. In July 2015, the company changed its name to VEREIT. In September 2019, certain defendants agreed to pay $1.025 billion, consisting of $738.5 million from the company, $225 million from the company's former external manager and its principals including Nicholas Schorsch, $12.5 million from the company's former CFO Brian Block who was found guilty of securities fraud in 2017 and sentenced to 18 months in prison, and $49 million from the company's former auditor Grant Thornton. VEREIT also settled pending litigation by plaintiffs under Section 11 of the Securities Act that were not part of the class action for $15.7 million.

On November 1, 2021, Realty Income acquired the company.
