= SEC Rule 10b-5 =

Regulation of United States Securities and Exchange Commission

SEC Rule 10b-5, codified at 17 CFR 240.10b-5, is one of the most important rules targeting securities fraud in the United States. It was promulgated by the U.S. Securities and Exchange Commission (SEC), pursuant to its authority granted under § 10(b) of the Securities Exchange Act of 1934. The rule prohibits any act or omission resulting in fraud or deceit in connection with the purchase or sale of any security. The issue of insider trading is given further definition in SEC Rule 10b5-1.

== History ==
In 1942, SEC lawyers in the Boston Regional Office learned that a company president was issuing pessimistic statements about company earnings while simultaneously purchasing the company's stock. Although the Securities Act of 1933 prohibited fraudulent sales of securities, no regulation existed at that time which would have precluded fraudulent purchases. Rule 10b-5, issued by the SEC under section 10(b) of the Exchange Act, was implemented to fill this regulatory void. The commissioners approved the rule without debate or comment, with the exception of Commissioner Sumner Pike who indicated approval of the rule by asking, "Well, we are against fraud, aren't we?"

== Language of the rule ==
"Rule 10b-5: Employment of Manipulative and Deceptive Practices":

It shall be unlawful for any person, directly or indirectly, by the use of any means or instrumentality of interstate commerce, or of the mails or of any facility of any national securities exchange,

(a) To employ any device, scheme, or artifice to defraud,
(b) To make any untrue statement of a material fact or to omit to state a material fact necessary in order to make the statements made, in the light of the circumstances under which they were made, not misleading, or
(c) To engage in any act, practice, or course of business which operates or would operate as a fraud or deceit upon any person, in connection with the purchase or sale of any security."

== Elements of the offense ==
To establish a claim under Rule 10b-5, plaintiffs (including the SEC) must show (i) Manipulation or Deception (through misrepresentation and/or omission); (ii) Materiality; (iii) "In Connection With" the purchase or sale of securities, and (iv) Scienter. Private plaintiffs have the additional burden of establishing (v) Standing - Purchaser/Seller Requirement; (vi) Reliance (presumed if there was an omission); (vii) Loss Causation; and (viii) Damages.

These are roughly comparable to the elements of common law fraud, which are i) Deception; ii) Materiality; iii) with Intent to Cause Reliance; that iv) causes Actual Reliance; and v) Harm.

In a case for insider trading, anyone who uses insider information can be held liable. A tippee can be liable if the tipper breached a fiduciary duty and the tippee knew or had reason to know that the tipper was breaching the duty.

=== Deceit and reliance ===
Deceit can be in the form of an affirmative misrepresentation or of an omission of fact which, in context, makes other facts misleading.

Furthermore, for a private party to recover damages, they must be able to show that they were injured because they relied on the fraudulent claim. Alternately, fraud can occur through omission of a material fact, where the injured party does not have to prove reliance, because it is assumed to have occurred. If the defendant had publicly made a fraudulent statement, every investor could sue if it could be shown that the statement affected the market as a whole. This is the "fraud on the market" theory the Supreme Court enunciated in Basic Inc. v. Levinson. This "fraud on the market" presumption of the plaintiff's reliance upon the deceit is only available in situations (like in Basic) where the security is traded on a well organized and presumably efficient market. The same can be said for an omission of material information.

==== Forward-looking statements ====
Both the "bespeaks caution" doctrine and the safe harbor provisions of the Private Securities Litigation Reform Act offer protection for forward-looking statements if they are accompanied by cautionary language identifying specific factors that could cause actual results to differ materially from those in the forward-looking statement and may be sufficient to absolve a defendant of liability. However, in Iowa Public Employees' Retirement System v. MF Global Ltd., the US Second Circuit Court of Appeals overturned a decision by the District Court for the Southern District of New York, ruling that the "bespeaks caution" defense to securities disclosure claims applies exclusively to forward-looking statements and not to characterizations that communicate present or historical fact.

=== Materiality ===
In the case of TSC Industries, Inc. v. Northway, Inc., the word "material" was defined by the U.S. Supreme Court - "an omitted fact is material if there is a substantial likelihood that a reasonable shareholder would consider it important in deciding how to vote." There are four elements of materiality laid out in TSC: a fact must assume "actual significance" in the deliberations of a "reasonable shareholder" because the fact would have "significantly altered" the "total mix" of information available to that shareholder in making its decisions. Each of those elements is itself the subject of extensive litigation.

=== Scienter ===
Negligence is not sufficient for a claim under 10b-5; plaintiffs or prosecutors must show at least recklessness, purpose, or knowledge.

=== Standing ===
The purchaser/seller requirement is the requirement that, to bring an action under 10b-5, a private plaintiff must be either a buyer or a seller of the company's stock. Potential buyers who were defrauded into not buying stock may not bring a claim under 10b-5.

=== Loss causation and damages ===
To recover, plaintiffs must be able to show that the fraud proximately caused their losses. Standard damages in fraud cases are expectation or benefit of bargain damages.

== Insider trading ==
To what extent Rule 10b-5 prohibits insider trading is a matter of some dispute. The SEC has long advocated an "equal access theory" with regard to 10b-5, arguing that anyone who has material, non-public information must either disclose that information or abstain from trading. However, the Supreme Court rejected the strongest version of that theory in Chiarella v. United States, holding a person with no fiduciary duty to the shareholders had no duty to disclose information before trading on it. In 1997, the Supreme Court has embraced a "misappropriation" theory of omissions, holding in United States v. O'Hagan that misappropriating confidential information for securities trading purposes, in breach of a duty owed to the source of that information, gives rise to a duty to disclose or abstain.

== Enforcement ==
Both the SEC and private citizens can enforce the requirements of the rule through lawsuits. In Blue Chip Stamps v. Manor Drug Stores, the Supreme Court held that only purchasers or sellers of securities may bring a private action for damages under Rule 10b-5; however any member of the public may provide information to the SEC regarding possible violations of the federal securities laws.

== SEC Rule 10b5-1 ==
SEC Rule 10b5-1, codified at 17 CFR 240.10b5-1, was enacted as a regulation by the SEC in 2000. The SEC stated that Rule 10b5-1 was enacted in order to resolve an unsettled issue over the definition of insider trading, which is prohibited by SEC Rule 10b-5. In March 2023, in the first-ever indictment for insider trading based on an executive's use of a Rule 10b5-1 plan, the Department of Justice charged Terren Peizer with one count of engaging in a securities fraud scheme and two counts of securities fraud for insider trading. The SEC alleged that Peizer sold $20 million of Ontrak Inc. stock while he was in possession of material nonpublic negative information. Peizer was the CEO and chairman of Ontrak. In addition, the U.S. Department of Justice announced criminal charges of securities fraud against Peizer, charging that thereby he had avoided $12 million in losses; he was arrested. The case is assigned to the U.S. District Court for the Central District of California before U.S. District Judge Dale S. Fischer. Peizer was convicted at a jury trial, and could face up to 65 years in prison.

== Sources ==
- Cioppa, Paolo (2009) "Unexpected Insider Trading Abuses and the Need for Revision of Rule 10b5-1(c)," Global Jurist: Vol. 9 : Iss. 1 (Topics), Article 5.
