= Securities Exchange Act of 1934 =

1934 U.S. legislation establishing rules and regulatory bodies for financial markets

- Long title: An act to provide for the regulation of securities exchanges and of over-the-counter markets operating in interstate and foreign commerce and through the mails, to prevent inequitable and unfair practices on such exchanges and markets, and for other purposes.
- Nicknames: Securities Exchange Act; Exchange Act; 1934 Act '34 Act
- Enacted by: the 73rd United States Congress

Citations
- Public law: Pub. L. 73–291
- Statutes at Large: 48 Stat. 881

Codification
- Titles amended: 15 U.S.C.: Commerce and Trade
- U.S.C. sections created: 15 U.S.C. § 78a et seq.

Legislative history
- Signed into law by President Franklin D. Roosevelt on June 6, 1934

Major amendments
- Dodd–Frank Wall Street Reform and Consumer Protection Act; Economic Growth, Regulatory Relief and Consumer Protection Act

United States Supreme Court cases
- Silver v. N.Y. Stock Exch., 373 U.S. 341 (1963); J.I. Case Co. v. Borak, 377 U.S. 426 (1964); TSC Indus. v. Northway, 426 U.S. 438 (1976); Chiarella v. United States, 445 U.S. 222 (1980); Basic Inc. v. Levinson, 485 U.S. 224 (1988); Central Bank of Denver v. First Interstate Bank of Denver, 511 U.S. 164 (1994); Plaut v. Spendthrift Farm, Inc., 514 U.S. 211 (1995); Wharf Holdings v. United Int'l Holdings, 532 U.S. 588 (2001); Dura Pharm. v. Broudo, 544 U.S. 336 (2005); Stoneridge Inv. Partners v. Scientific-Atlanta, 552 U.S. 148 (2008); Matrixx Initiatives v. Siracusano, 563 U.S. 27 (2011); Credit Suisse Securities (USA) LLC v. Simmonds, 566 U.S. 221 (2012); Halliburton Co. v. Erica P. John Fund, Inc., 573 U.S. 258 (2014); Salman v. United States, No. 15-628, 580 U.S. ___ (2016); Liu v. Securities and Exchange Commission, No. 18-1501, 591 U.S. ___ (2020); Goldman Sachs Group, Inc. v. Arkansas Teacher Retirement System, No. 20-222, 594 U.S. ___ (2021); Axon Enterprise, Inc. v. Federal Trade Commission, No. 21-86, 598 U.S. ___ (2023); Macquarie Infrastructure Corp. v. Moab Partners, L.P., No. 22-1165, 601 U.S. ___ (2024)

The Securities Exchange Act of 1934 (also called the Exchange Act, '34 Act, or 1934 Act) (Pub. L. 73–291, 48 Stat. 881, enacted June 6, 1934, codified at 15 U.S.C. § 78a et seq.) is a law governing the secondary trading of securities (stocks, bonds, and debentures) in the United States of America. A landmark piece of wide-ranging legislation, the Act of '34 and related statutes form the basis of regulation of the financial markets and their participants in the United States. The 1934 Act also established the Securities and Exchange Commission (SEC), the agency primarily responsible for enforcement of United States federal securities law.

Companies raise billions of dollars by issuing securities in what is known as the primary market. Contrasted with the Securities Act of 1933, which regulates these original issues, the Securities Exchange Act of 1934 regulates the secondary trading of those securities between persons often unrelated to the issuer, frequently through brokers or dealers. Trillions of dollars are made and lost each year through trading in the secondary market.

== Securities exchanges ==
One area subject to the 1934 Act's regulation is the physical place where securities (stocks, bonds, notes of debenture) are exchanged. Here, agents of the exchange, or specialists, act as middlemen for the competing interests in the buying and selling of securities. An important function of the specialist is to inject liquidity and price continuity into the market. Some of the more well known exchanges include the New York Stock Exchange, the NASDAQ and the NYSE American.

== Securities associations ==
The 1934 Act also regulates broker-dealers without a status for trading securities. A telecommunications infrastructure has developed to provide for trading without a physical location. Previously these brokers would find stock prices through newspaper printings and conduct trades verbally by telephone. Today, a digital information network connects these brokers. This system is called NASDAQ, standing for the National Association of Securities Dealers Automated Quotation System.

== Self-regulatory organizations (SRO) ==
In 1938, the Exchange Act was amended by the Maloney Act, which authorized the formation and registration of national securities associations. These groups would supervise the conduct of their members subject to the oversight of the SEC. The Maloney Act led to the creation of the National Association of Securities Dealers, Inc. – the NASD, which is a Self-Regulatory Organization (or SRO). The NASD had primary responsibility for oversight of brokers and brokerage firms, and later, the NASDAQ stock market. In 1996, the SEC criticized the NASD for putting its interests as the operator of NASDAQ ahead of its responsibilities as the regulator, and the organization was split in two, one entity regulating the brokers and firms, the other regulating the NASDAQ market. In 2007, the NASD merged with the NYSE (which had already taken over the AMEX), and the Financial Industry Regulatory Authority (FINRA) was created.

== Other trading platforms ==
In the last 30 years, brokers have created two additional systems for trading securities. The alternative trading system, or ATS, is a quasi exchange where stocks are commonly purchased and sold through a smaller, private network of brokers, dealers, and other market participants. The ATS is distinguished from exchanges and associations in that the volumes for ATS trades are comparatively low, and the trades tend to be controlled by a small number of brokers or dealers. ATS acts as a niche market, a private pool of liquidity. Reg ATS, an SEC regulation issued in the late 1990s, requires these small markets to 1) register as a broker with the NASD, 2) register as an exchange, or 3) operate as an unregulated ATS, staying under low trading caps.

A specialized form of ATS, the Electronic Communications Network (or ECN), has been described as the "black box" of securities trading. The ECN is a completely automated network, anonymously matching buy and sell orders. Many traders use one or more trading mechanisms (the exchanges, NASDAQ, and an ECN or ATS) to effect large buy or sell orders – conscious of the fact that overreliance on one market for a large trade is likely to unfavorably alter the trading price of the target security.

== Issues ==
While the 1933 Act recognizes that timely information about the issuer is vital to effective pricing of securities, the 1933 Act's disclosure requirement (the registration statement and prospectus) is a one-time affair. The 1934 Act extends this requirement to securities traded in the secondary market. Provided that the company has more than a certain number of shareholders and has a certain amount of assets (500 shareholders, above $10 million in assets, per Act sections 12, 13, and 15), the 1934 Act requires that issuers regularly file company information with the SEC on certain forms (the annual 10-K filing and the quarterly 10-Q filing). The filed reports are available to the public via EDGAR. If something material happens with the company (change of CEO, change of auditing firm, destruction of a significant number of company assets), the SEC requires that the company issue within 4 business days an 8-K filing that reflects these changed conditions (see Regulation FD). With these regularly required filings, buyers are better able to assess the worth of the company, and buy and sell the stock according to that information.

== Antifraud provisions ==
While the 1933 Act contains an antifraud provision (Section 17), when the 1934 Act was enacted, questions remained about the reach of that antifraud provision and whether a private right of action—that is, the right of an individual private citizen to sue an issuer of stock or related market actor, as opposed to government suits—existed for purchasers. As it developed, section 10(b) of the 1934 Act and corresponding SEC Rule 10b-5 have sweeping antifraud language. Section 10(b) of the Act (as amended) provides (in pertinent part):

It shall be unlawful for any person, directly or indirectly, by the use of any means or instrumentality of interstate commerce or of the mails, or of any facility of any national securities exchange ...

(b) To use or employ, in connection with the purchase or sale of any security registered on a national securities exchange or any security not so registered, or any securities-based swap agreement (as defined in section 206B of the Gramm–Leach–Bliley Act), any manipulative or deceptive device or contrivance in contravention of such rules and regulations as the Commission may prescribe as necessary or appropriate in the public interest or for the protection of investors.

Section 10(b) is codified at 15 U.S.C. § 78j(b).

The breadth and utility of section 10(b) and Rule 10b-5 in the pursuit of securities litigation are significant. Rule 10b-5 has been employed to cover insider trading cases, but has also been used against companies for price fixing (artificially inflating or depressing stock prices through stock manipulation), bogus company sales to increase stock price, and even a company's failure to communicate relevant information to investors. Many plaintiffs in the securities litigation field plead violations of section 10(b) and Rule 10b-5 as a "catch-all" allegation, in addition to violations of the more specific antifraud provisions in the 1934 Act.

== Exemptions from reporting because of national security ==
Section 13(b)(3)(A) of the Securities Exchange Act of 1934 provides that "with respect to matters concerning the national security of the United States", the president or the head of an Executive Branch agency may exempt companies from certain critical legal obligations. These obligations include keeping accurate "books, records, and accounts" and maintaining "a system of internal accounting controls sufficient" to ensure the propriety of financial transactions and the preparation of financial statements in compliance with "generally accepted accounting principles".

On May 5, 2006, in a notice in the Federal Register, President Bush delegated authority under this section to John Negroponte, the Director of National Intelligence. Administration officials told Business Week that they believe this is the first time a president has ever delegated the authority to someone outside the Oval Office.

== See also ==
- Securities regulation in the United States
- Commodity Futures Trading Commission
- Securities commission
- Chicago Stock Exchange
- Financial regulation
- NASDAQ
- New York Stock Exchange
- Stock exchange
- Regulation D (SEC)

Related legislation

- 1933 – Securities Act of 1933
- 1938 – Temporary National Economic Committee (establishment)
- 1939 – Trust Indenture Act of 1939
- 1940 – Investment Advisers Act of 1940
- 1940 – Investment Company Act of 1940
- 1968 – Williams Act (Securities Disclosure Act)
- 1975 – Securities Acts Amendments of 1975
- 1982 – Garn–St. Germain Depository Institutions Act
- 1999 – Gramm-Leach-Bliley Act
- 2000 – Commodity Futures Modernization Act of 2000
- 2002 – Sarbanes–Oxley Act
- 2006 – Credit Rating Agency Reform Act of 2006
- 2010 – Dodd–Frank Wall Street Reform and Consumer Protection Act
