= F4 =

F4, F.IV, F04, F 4, F.4 or F-4 may refer to:

== Aircraft ==
- Flanders F.4, a 1910s British experimental military two-seat monoplane aircraft
- Martinsyde F.4 Buzzard, a British World War I fighter version of the Martinsyde Buzzard biplane
- Fokker F.IV, a 1921 Dutch airliner
- Caproni Vizzola F.4, an Italian prototype fighter of 1939
- Lockheed F-4 Lightning, a reconnaissance variant of the Lockheed P-38 Lightning World War 2 fighter
- Fleetwings Sea Bird, a variant of which was the F-4
- A number of aircraft that first entered service with the U.S. Navy:
  - Curtiss F4C, a 1920s version of the Naval Aircraft Factory TS biplane fighter
  - Boeing F4B, a 1930s version of the Boeing P-12 biplane fighter
  - Grumman F4F Wildcat, a carrier-based fighter aircraft in World War 2
  - Vought F4U Corsair, a World War 2 fighter
  - Douglas F4D Skyray, a carrier-based fighter/interceptor, first flight 1951
  - McDonnell Douglas F-4 Phantom II, a supersonic fighter-bomber, first flight 1958

== Art, entertainment, and music ==
- F4, or Flower 4, the four handsome boys appearing in Japanese manga Boys Over Flowers
- F4 (band), Taiwanese boy band
- F4 Thailand, a Thai television series
- F_{4}, Middle F (musical note)
- Fantastic Four, fictional superhero team

== Computing and technology ==
- Faugère's F4 algorithm in computer algebra
- F4, a function key on a computer keyboard
- f4transkript, a transcription software
- Samsung Galaxy F04, an Android-based smartphone manufactured by Samsung Electronics

== Mathematics ==
- F_{4} (mathematics), an exceptional Lie group, or its Lie algebra $\mathfrak f_4$
- $\mathbb F_4$, the field with four elements
- F_{4}, Fermat number

== Sports and games ==
- F4 (classification), a wheelchair sport classification
- Formula 4, a class of car racing
- f4, designates a square in Algebraic notation (chess)
- 1. f4, or Bird's opening, an opening move in chess

== Transportation and vehicles ==
- F4 (Istanbul Metro), a funicular railway in Istanbul Turkey
- Cross Harbour ferry service, or Cross Harbour ferry services (2017–2020), Sydney, Australia
- Pyrmont Bay ferry service, or Pyrmont Bay ferry services, Sydney, Australia
- Albarka Air (IATA code), a Nigerian airline
- Front-engine, four-wheel-drive layout, in automotive design
- Italian submarine F4, an Italian Regia Marina (Royal Navy) submarine in commission from 1917 to 1919
- MV Agusta F4 series, a series of motorcycles
- USS F-4, a U.S. Navy submarine that sank near Honolulu harbor in 1915
- LNER Class F4, a class of British steam locomotives

== Other uses ==
- F4, a paper size
- F 4 Frösön, a former Swedish Air Force wing
- f/4, an f-number of an optical system such as a camera lens
- F-4 Object, or Rákosi bunker, a formerly secret nuclear shelter in Budapest, Hungary
- Form F-4, an American form used to register securities
- Nikon F4, an SLR camera
- F4, a tornado intensity rating on the Fujita scale
- F4, an electrode site according to the 10–20 system (EEG)
- F4 visa, a visa used for Korean adoptees to gain South Korean citizenship

== See also ==
- 4F (disambiguation)
- Four Fs (disambiguation)
