= Form 10-K405 =

U.S. SEC filing used to indicate lack of insider trading disclosure

Form 10-K405 is an SEC filing to the US Securities and Exchange Commission (SEC) that indicates that an officer or director of a public company failed to file a Form 4 (or related Form 3 or Form 5) on time, in violation of Section 16 - meaning that they did not disclose their insider trading activities within the required time period.

Prior to 2003, 10-K forms submitted to the SEC contained the following qualifier:

Indicate by check mark if disclosure of delinquent filers pursuant to Item 405 of Regulation S-K is not contained herein, and will not be contained to the best of registrant's knowledge in definitive proxy or information statements incorporated by reference in Part III of this Form 10-K or any amendment to this Form 10-K. [X]

If this box is checked on the form, the SEC asks that it be filed as a 10-K405. Otherwise the form is filed as a 10-K. Other than the checkbox, the SEC indicates there is no difference in substance between the two forms. For the years where electronic filing has been required, almost one-third of the filings are registered as a 10-K405. This classification was discontinued after 2002.

According to the Branch of Public Reference at the SEC:

The requirement to designate a Form 10-K as a Form 10-K405 was eliminated after it was determined that the use of the designation by companies was inconsistent and therefore not reliable. The form type is no longer accepted by the EDGAR system.
