= Four Fs =

Four Fs may stand for:

- Four Fs (evolution), "fighting, fleeing, feeding, and fucking"
- Four Fs (legal), "fruit, fungi, flowers, and foliage"
- "Fight, Flight, Freeze, and Fawn"
- Four Fs as applied in military parlance, "find, fix, flank, and finish"
- Friedrich Ludwig Jahn's "frisch, fromm, fröhlich, frei" ("fresh, pious, cheerful, free")

== See also ==
- 4F (disambiguation)
- F4 (disambiguation)
