= Form 10-K =

U.S. annual report for a company

A Form 10-K is an annual report required by the U.S. Securities and Exchange Commission (SEC), that gives a comprehensive summary of a company's financial performance. Although similarly named, the annual report on Form 10-K is distinct from the often glossy "annual report to shareholders", which a company must send to its shareholders when it holds an annual meeting to elect directors (though some companies combine the annual report and the 10-K into one document). The 10-K includes information such as company history, organizational structure, executive compensation, equity, subsidiaries, and audited financial statements, among other information.

Companies with more than $10 million in assets and a class of equity securities that is held by more than 2000 owners must file annual and other periodic reports, regardless of whether the securities are publicly or privately traded. Up until March 16, 2009, smaller companies could use Form 10-KSB. If a shareholder requests a company's Form 10-K, the company must provide a copy. In addition, most large companies must disclose on Form 10-K whether the company makes its periodic and current reports available, free of charge, on its website. Form 10-K, as well as other SEC filings may be searched at the EDGAR database on the SEC's website. Academic researchers make this report metadata available as structured datasets in the Harvard Dataverse.

In addition to the 10-K, which is filed annually, a company is also required to file quarterly reports on Form 10-Q. Information for the final quarter of a firm's fiscal year is included in the annual 10-K, so only three 10-Q filings are made each year. In the period between these filings, and in case of a significant event, such as a CEO departing, material cybersecurity incident or bankruptcy, a Form 8-K must be filed in order to provide up to date information.

The name of the Form 10-K comes from the Code of Federal Regulations (CFR) designation of the form pursuant to sections 13 and 15(d) of the Securities Exchange Act of 1934 as amended.

== Related forms ==
Unlike the 10-K filed annually, other forms serve related purposes, but have different schedules. Form 10-Q, much briefer, is filed after each of the three quarters that do not have a 10-K filing. Form 8-K covers special material events that occur between 10-K and 10-Q filings.

A substantial number of firms filed their 10-K as a Form 10-K405 during the late 1990s and early 2000s (decade). A 10-K405 is a 10-K where the Regulation S-K Item 405 box on the cover page is checked. Due to confusion in its application, the 10-K405 was eliminated in 2002.

== Filing deadlines ==
Historically, Form 10-K had to be filed with the SEC within 90 days after the end of the company's fiscal year. However, in 2004, the SEC approved a Final Rule that changed the deadlines to 60 days for Form 10-K for "accelerated filers"; meaning issuers that have a public float of at least $75 million, that have been subject to the Exchange Act's reporting requirements for at least 12 calendar months, that previously have filed at least one annual report, and that are not eligible to file their quarterly and annual reports on Forms 10-QSB and 10-KSB. These shortened deadlines were to be phased in over a three-year period, however, in 2004 the SEC postponed the three-year phase-in by one year. In December 2005, the SEC created a third category of "large accelerated filers," accelerated filers with a public float of over $700 million. As of December 27, 2005, the deadline for filing for large accelerated filers was still 75 days, however, beginning with the fiscal year ending on or after December 15, 2006, the deadline was changed to 60 days. For other accelerated filers the deadline remains at 75 days and for non-accelerated filers the deadline remains at 90 days. For further reading, see the Final Rules section of the SEC's website, referencing Rule 33–8644.

== Parts ==
Every annual report contains 4 parts and 15 schedules. They are:

=== Part 1 ===
==== Item 1 – Business ====
This describes the business of the company: who and what the company does, what subsidiaries it owns, and what markets it operates in. It may also include recent events, competition, regulations, and labor issues. (Some industries are heavily regulated, have complex labor requirements, which have significant effects on the business.) Other topics in this section may include special operating costs, seasonal factors, or insurance matters.

==== Item 1A – Risk Factors ====
Here, the company lays anything that could go wrong, likely external effects, possible future failures to meet obligations, and other risks disclosed to adequately warn investors and potential investors.

==== Item 1B – Unresolved Staff Comments ====
Requires the company to explain certain comments it has received from the SEC staff on previously filed reports that have not been resolved after an extended period of time. Check here to see whether the SEC has raised any questions about the company's statements that have not been resolved.

==== Item 1C - Cybersecurity ====
Here the company must explain the risk management and strategy including any processes for assessing, identifying and managing the risks arising from cybersecurity threats. The company must describe if any previous cybersecurity incidents have had a material affect or are materially likely to have an affect and how, as well as the board's and management's role and oversight of cybersecurity risk and their relevant expertise.

==== Item 2 – Properties ====
This section lays out the significant properties, physical assets, of the company. This only includes physical types of property, not intellectual or intangible property.

==== Item 3 – Legal Proceedings ====
Here, the company discloses any significant pending lawsuit or other legal proceeding. References to these proceedings could also be disclosed in the Risks section or other parts of the report.

==== Item 4 – Mine Safety Disclosures ====
This section requires some companies to provide information about mine safety violations or other regulatory matters.

=== Part 2 ===
==== Item 5 – Market ====
Gives highs and lows of stock, in a simple statement. Market for Registrant's Common Equity, related stockholder matters and issuer purchases of equity securities.

==== Item 6 – Consolidated Financial Data ====
In this section Financial Data showing consolidated records for the legal entity as well as subsidiary companies.

==== Item 7 – Management's Discussion and Analysis of Financial Condition and Results of Operations ====
Here, management discusses the operations of the company in detail by usually comparing the current period versus prior period. These comparisons provide a reader an overview of the operational issues of what causes such increases or decreases in the business.

==== Item 7A – Quantitative and Qualitative Disclosures about Market Risks ====
===== Forward Looking Statements =====
Forward-looking statement is the disclaimer that projections as to future performance are not guaranteed, and things could go otherwise.

==== Item 8 – Financial Statements ====
1. Independent Auditor's Report
2. Consolidated Statements of Operation
3. Consolidated Balance Sheets
4. Other accounting reports and notes

Here, also, is the going concern opinion. This is the opinion of the auditor as to the viability of the company. Look for "unqualified opinion" expressed by auditor. This means the auditor had no hesitations or reservations about the state of the company, and the opinion is without any qualifications (unconditional).

==== Item 9. Changes in and Disagreements With Accountants on Accounting and Financial Disclosure ====
Requires a company, if there has been a change in its accountants, to discuss any disagreements it had with those accountants.

==== Item 9A. Controls and Procedures ====
Includes information about the company’s disclosure controls and procedures and its internal control over financial reporting.

=== Part 3 ===
Item 10. Directors, Executive Officers and Corporate Governance

Item 11. Executive Compensation

Item 12. Security Ownership of Certain Beneficial Owners and Management and Related Stockholder Matters

Item 13. Certain Relationships and Related Transactions, and Director Independence

Item 14. Principal Accounting Fees and Services

=== Part 4 ===
Item 15. Exhibits, Financial Statement Schedules Signatures

== Five percent ownership ==
Five percent ownership refers to companies or individuals who hold at least 5% of the total value of the stock of a public company. They usually are founders of the company or large mutual fund companies, and because of how much stock they own, they usually have access to the board of directors of the company and hold significant sway over the company.

Five percent owners must also file Schedule 13d with the SEC.

== See also ==
- US corporate law
- Form 10-Q, typically required 45 days from close of the financial quarter (a 10-K is required 60 to 90 days from close of the financial year)
