= Form 3 =

Type of U.S. SEC filing

Form 3 is an SEC filing filed with the US Securities and Exchange Commission to indicate a preliminary insider transaction by an officer, director, or beneficial (10%) owner of the company's securities. These are typically seen after a company IPOs when insiders make their first transactions. After a Form 3 is filed, future filings of the same nature are filed under Form 4 (standard disclosure) or Form 5 (annual disclosure).

Form 3 is stored in SEC's EDGAR database and academic researchers make these reports freely available as structured datasets in the Harvard Dataverse.
