= Rear (military) =

Position furthest from the area of conflict

United States Marine Corps combat logistics personnel conversing before a patrol training exercise in 2012

In military parlance, the rear is the part of concentration of military forces that is furthest from the enemy (compare its antonym, the front). The rear typically contains all logistic and management elements of the force necessary to support the front line forces, and generally constitutes supply depots, ammunition dumps, field hospitals, machine shops, planning/communication facilities, command headquarters, and infrastructure such as roads, bridges, airfields, dockyards, and railway depots.

Military personnel in the rear are usually called the rear detachment, and they are responsible for staffing, supplying, and maintaining the rear elements. The rear is considered a crucial part of military organization, and it can sometimes outnumber the unit's front line force by several times.

In aviation, the term second line is used. The expression second line generally relates to aircraft used for an air arm's own internal support functions, such as communications duties, target towing, navigational aids duties, and so on. Combat and transport aircraft are not generally included in the designation, although towards the end of their lives they can be relegated to second-line operations.

== See also ==
- Rear admiral
- Rearguard
- Tooth-to-tail ratio
- Rear echelon mother fucker
