= Investor application =

Mobile app for investors

An investor application (or investor app) is a mobile application designed to distribute information about publicly traded companies. It can provide general investor information or be company specific. There are two types of investor apps: Native investor apps and HTML5 investor apps. Most investor apps offer access to public company content such as stock quotes, corporate materials, fact sheets, presentations and marketing materials as well as information sharing through social media channels and email.

IR apps are now joining the ranks of games, utilities and other app categories. Mobile apps for investor relations appear to be an emerging trend as more corporations are expected to move in this direction. The popularity of investor apps began to rise in 2011 as their usage became more prevalent and new investor app developers. Nearly 116 million Americans will use a smartphone by the end of 2012, up from 93.1 million in 2011 – and by 2016, nearly three out of every five consumers will have a smartphone.

== General vs company-specific ==
General investor apps provide all general business and financial news, market data and portfolio tracking tools. They offer investors ways to stay active and connect to the market, manage accounts, create customized interactive charts and access live streaming news. Most general investor apps also allow investors to track multiple stocks.

Company specific investor apps deliver a public company's investor relations information directly to investors. They give investors access to the latest stock price information, news, SEC filings, background information, videos, presentations, etc. on that specific company.

== Types ==
Investor apps offer companies the ability to relay financial information to investors in order to drive shareholder engagement, increase brand awareness and enhance investor relationships. Investor apps are available as native or HTML5 apps.

=== Native vs HTML5 ===
Native investor apps offer alerts and social sharing, email opt-in and push notifications. These features let investors know when new information is available. These apps deliver automated stock price information, new wire-released press releases and SEC filings to investors' mobile devices.

HTML5 investor apps work well for intermittent traffic, when a website or webpage is not visited regularly. Strong internet connectivity is required to perform well and push notifications and offline storage are not offered. These apps allow cross platform development and simple, fast content updates via standard site CMS, or content management systems. These apps are not available on the Apple iTunes App Store.

== Features ==
The majority of investor apps include alerts, social sharing and investor tracking features. Additional features may include: push notifications alerting investors to new information; the ability to sign up for company information and investor email opt-in automated; real-time stock price information; and automated posting of newswire-released press releases and SEC filings.
