= Form D =

U.S. SEC filing for exempt offering of securities

Form D is a SEC filing form to file a notice of an exempt offering of securities under Regulation D of the U.S. Securities and Exchange Commission. Commission rules require the notice to be filed by companies and funds that have sold securities without registration under the Securities Act of 1933 in an offering based on a claim of exemption under Rule 504 or 506 of Regulation D or Section 4(6) of that statute. Commission rules further require the notice to be filed within 15 days after the first sale of securities in the offering. For this purpose, the date of the first sale is when the first investor is irrevocably contractually committed to invest. If the due date falls on a Saturday, Sunday or holiday, it is moved to the next business day.

Privately held companies that raise capital are required to file a Form D with the SEC to declare exempt offering of securities. Many of these filings show investments in small, growing companies through venture capital and angel investors, and certain pooled investment funds.

Starting in 2009, Form D was required to be filed electronically through EDGAR, the SEC's online submission platform. In 2024, it a study at Lehigh University found that more than half of private companies that raised funds in private markets filed to file a Form D. Later that year, the SEC took its first ever enforcement action targeted at failure to file Form D, charging penalties ranging from $60,000 to $195,000.
