= SEC filing =

Type of financial statements in the United States

Securities and Exchange Commission (SEC) logo

The SEC filing is a financial statement or other formal document submitted to the U.S. Securities and Exchange Commission (SEC). Public companies, certain insiders, and broker-dealers are required to make regular SEC filings. Investors and financial professionals rely on these filings for information about companies they are evaluating for investment purposes. Many, but not all SEC filings are available online through the SEC's EDGAR (Electronic Data Gathering, Analysis, and Retrieval) database and as structured datasets in the Harvard Dataverse.

== Common filing types ==
The most commonly filed SEC forms are the 10-K and the 10-Q. These forms are composed of four main sections: the business section, the F-pages, the Risk Factors, and the Management's Discussion and Analysis (MD&A). The business section provides an overview of the company, the F-pages contain the financial statements which are either audited or reviewed by an independent auditor, the Risk Factors are a list of all of the potential risks that exist for the company, and the MD&A contains a narrative about the financial results of the company. This narrative is also accompanied by management's expectations for the upcoming year.

Form name	Description
F-1	Registration statement for certain foreign private issuers
Form D	An exempt offering of securities under Regulation D
3	Initial statement of beneficial ownership (insider transactions)

Other filings are required with respect to offerings by private companies.

== All filing types ==
The filings accepted by the SEC as of November 2011 are:

Form name	Description
1-E, 1-E/A	Notification under Regulation E by small business investment companies and business development companies (and amendment thereto)
1-E AD, 1-E AD/A	Sales material filed pursuant to Rule 607 under Regulation E (and amendment thereto)
2-E, 2-E/A	Sales material filed pursuant to Rule 609 under Regulation E (and amendment thereto)
10-12B, 10-12B/A	Initial general form for registration of a class of securities pursuant to section 12(b) (and amendment thereto)
10-12G, 10-12G/A	Initial general form for registration of a class of securities pursuant to section 12(g) (and amendment thereto)
10-D, 10-D/A	Periodic distribution reports by asset-backed issuers pursuant to Rule 13a-17 or 15d-17 (and amendment thereto)
10-K, 10-K/A	Annual report pursuant to section 13 and 15(d) (and amendment thereto)
10-KT, 10-KT/A	Transition report pursuant to Rule 13a-10 or 15d-10 (and amendment thereto)
10-Q, 10-Q/A	Quarterly report pursuant to section 13 and 15(d) (and amendment thereto)
10-QT, 10-QT/A	Transition report pursuant to Rule 13a-10 or 15d-10 (and amendment thereto)
11-K, 11-K/A	Annual report of employee stock purchase, savings and similar plans (and amendment thereto)
11-KT, 11-KT/A	Transition report pursuant to Rule 13a-10 or 15d-10 (and amendment thereto)
13F-HR, 13F-HR/A	Initial quarterly holdings report filed by institutional managers (and amendment thereto)
13F-NT, 13F-NT/A	Initial quarterly notice Report filed by institutional managers (and amendment thereto)
13H, 13H-Q, 13H-A, 13H-I, 13H-R, 13H-T	Large trader registration information required of large traders pursuant to the Securities Exchange Act of 1934 and Rule 13h-1 thereunder. Initial filing is 13H, amended filing is 13H-Q, annual filing is 13H-A, declaration of inactive status is 13H-I, declaration of deactivated status is 13H-R, and termination filing is 13H-T.
144, 144/A	Filing for proposed sale of securities under Rule 144 (and amendment thereto)
15-12B, 15-12B/A	Notice of termination of registration of a class of securities under Section 12(b) (and amendment thereto)
15-12G, 15-12G/A	Notice of termination of registration of a class of securities under Section 12(g) (and amendment thereto)
15-15D, 15-15D/A	Notice of suspension of duty to file reports pursuant to Section 13 and 15(d) of the Act (and amendment thereto)
15F-12G, 15F-12G/A	Notice of termination of a foreign private issuer's registration of a class of securities under Section 12(g) (and amendment thereto)
15F-15D, 15F-15D/A	Notice of a foreign private issuers suspension of duty to file reports pursuant to Section 13 and 15(d) of the Act (and amendment thereto)
18-K, 18-K/A	Annual report for foreign governments (and amendment thereto)
20-F, 20-F/A	Annual and transition report of foreign private issuers pursuant to sections 13 or 15(d) (and amendment thereto)
20FR12B, 20FR12B/A	Form for initial registration of a class of securities of foreign private issuers pursuant to section 12(b) (and amendment thereto)
20FR12G, 20FR12G/A	Form for initial registration of a class of securities of foreign private issuers pursuant to section 12(g) (and amendment thereto)
24F-2NT, 24F-2NT/A	Rule 24F-2 notice filed on Form 24F-2 (and amendment thereto)
25, 25/A	Notification filed by issuer to voluntarily withdraw a class of securities from listing and registration on a national securities exchange (and amendment thereto)
25-NSE, 25-NSE/A	Notification filed by national security exchange to report the removal from listing and registration of matured, redeemed or retired securities (and amendment thereto)
3, 3/A	Initial statement of beneficial ownership of securities (and amendment thereto)
305B2, 305B2/A	Application for designation of a new trustee under the Trust Indenture Act
4, 4/A	Statement of changes in beneficial ownership of securities (and amendment thereto)
40-6B, 40-6B/A	Application under the Investment Company Act by an Employee's Securities Company
40-17F2	Initial certificate of accounting of securities and similar investments in the custody of management investment companies
40-17F2/A	Amendment
40-17G, 40-17G/A	Fidelity bond (and amendment thereto)
40-202A/A	Filing 40-202A/A
40-206A/A	Amendment
40-24B2, 40-24B2/A	Filing of sales literature (and amendment thereto)
40-33	All stockholder derivative actions filed with a court against an investment company or an affiliate
40-8B25	Document or Report
40-8F-2	Initial application for de-registration pursuant to Investment Company Act Rule 0-2
40-APP, 40-APP/A	Applications under the Investment Company Act other than those reviewed by the Office of Insurance Products (and amendment thereto)
40-F, 40-F/A	Annual reports filed by certain Canadian issuers (and amendment thereto)
40-OIP, 40-OIP/A	Applications under the Investment Company Act reviewed by Office of Insurance Products (and amendment thereto)
40FR12B, 40FR12B/A	Registration of a class of securities of certain Canadian issuers (and amendment thereto)
40FR12G, 40FR12G/A	Registration of a class of securities of certain Canadian issuers pursuant to Section 12(g) of the 1934 Act (and amendment thereto)
424A, 424B1, 424B2, 424B3, 424B4, 424B5, 424B6, 424B7, 424B8	Prospectus
425	Filing under Securities Act of 1933 Rule 425 of certain prospectuses and communications in connection with business combination transactions
485APOS, 485BPOS, 485BXT, 486APOS, 486BPOS	Post-effective amendment
487	Pre-effective pricing amendment
497	Definitive materials
497AD	Filing by certain investment companies of Securities Act Rule 482 advertising in accordance with Securities Act Rule 497
497H2	Filings made pursuant to Rule 497(h)(2)
497J	Certification of no change in definitive materials
497K1, 497K2, 497K3A, 497K3B	Profiles for certain open-end management investment companies
5, 5/A	Insider trading (and amendment thereto)
6-K, 6-K/A	Current report of foreign issuer (and amendment thereto)
8-A12B, 8-A12B/A	Registration of a class of securities on a national securities exchange (and amendment thereto)
8-A12G, 8-A12G/A	Notification that a class of securities of successor issuer is deemed to be registered (and amendment thereto)
8-K, 8-K/A	Events or changes between quarterly reports (and amendment thereto)
8-K12B, 8-K12B/A	Notification that a class of securities of successor issuer is deemed to be registered pursuant to Section 12(b) (and amendment thereto)
8-K12G3, 8-K12G3/A	Notification that a class of securities of successor issuer is deemed to be registered pursuant to Section 12(g) (and amendment thereto)
8-K15D5	Notification of assumption of duty to report by successor
8-M	
9-M	
ADN-MTL	
ADV-E	
ADV-H-C	
ADV-H-T	
ADV-NR	
ANNLRPT	Periodic Development Bank filing, submitted annually
APP WD	
ARS, ARS/A	Annual report to security holders (and amendment thereto)
AW	Withdrawal of amendment to a registration statement filed under the Securities Act
AW WD	Withdrawal of a request for withdrawal of an amendment to a registration statement
CB, CB/A	Certain tender offers, business combinations and rights offerings, in which the subject company is a foreign private issuer of which less than 10% of its securities are held by U.S. persons (and amendment thereto)
CERTAMX	
CERTNAS	
CERTNYS	
CERTPAC	
CORRESP	Correspondence
CT ORDER	Confidential Treatment Order
D, D/A	Official notice of an offering of securities that is made without registration under the Securities Act (and amendment thereto)
DEF 14A	Definitive proxy statements
DEF 14C	Definitive information statements
DEFA14C	Definitive additional information statement materials including Rule 14(a)(12) material
DEFC14A	Definitive proxy statement in connection with contested solicitations
DEFC14C	Definitive information statement - contested solicitations
DEFM14A	Definitive proxy statement relating to merger or acquisition
DEFM14C	Definitive information statement relating to merger or acquisition
DEFN14A	Definitive proxy statement filed by non-management
DEFR14A	Definitive revised proxy soliciting materials
DEFR14C	Definitive revised information statement materials
DEL AM	Separately filed delaying amendment
DFAN14A	Definitive additional proxy soliciting materials filed by non-management
DFRN14A	Revised definitive proxy statement filed by non-management
DSTRBRPT	Distribution of primary obligations Development Bank report
EFFECT	
F-1, F-1/A	Registration statement for securities of certain foreign private issuers (and amendment thereto)
F-10, F-10/A	Registration statement for securities of certain Canadian issuers (and amendment thereto)
F-10EF	Auto effective registration statement for securities of certain Canadian issuer under the Securities Act of 1933
F-10POS	Post-effective amendment to a F-10EF registration
F-1MEF	A new registration statement filed under Rule 462(b) to add securities to a prior related effective registration statement filed on Form F-1
F-3, F-3/A	Registration statement for specified transactions by certain foreign private issuers (and amendment thereto)
F-3ASR	Automatic shelf registration statement of securities of well-known seasoned issuers
F-3D	Registration statement for dividend or interest reinvestment plan securities of foreign private issuers
F-3DPOS	Post-effective amendment to a F-3D registration
F-4, F-4/A	Registration statement for securities issued by foreign private issuers in certain business combination transactions (and amendment thereto)
F-4 POS	Post-effective amendment to a F-4EF registration
F-6, F-6/A	Registration statement for American Depositary Receipts representing securities of certain foreign private issuers (and amendment thereto)
F-6 POS	Post-effective amendment to a F-6EF registration
F-6EF	Auto effective registration statement for American Depositary Receipts representing securities of certain foreign private issuers
F-7, F-7/A	Registration statement for securities of certain Canadian issuers offered for cash upon the exercise of rights granted to existing security holders (and amendment thereto)
F-7 POS	Post-effective amendment to a F-7 registration
F-8, F-8/A	Registration statement for securities of certain Canadian issuers to be issued in exchange offers or a business combination (and amendment thereto)
F-80	Registration of securities of certain Canadian issuers to be issued in exchange offers or a business combination under the Securities Act of 1933
F-9, F-9/A	Registration of securities of certain investment grade debt or investment grade preferred securities of certain Canadian issuers (and amendment thereto)
F-N	Notification of the appointment of an agent for service by certain foreign institutions
F-X, F-X/A	For appointment of agent for service of process by issuers registering securities (and amendment thereto)
FOCUSN, FOCUSN/A	
FWP	Filing under Securities Act Rules 163/433 of free writing prospectuses
G-405	
G-405N	
G-FIN, G-FIN/A	
MSD, MSD/A	
MSDW	
N-14, N-14/A	Initial registration statement for open-end investment company (and amendment thereto)
N-14 8C, N-14 8C/A	Initial registration statement filed on Form N14 by closed-end investment company (business combinations) (and amendment thereto)
N-14AE, N-14AE/A	
N-18F1, N-18F1/A	Initial notification of election pursuant to Rule 18f-1 filed on Form N-18F-1 (and amendment thereto)
N-1A, N-1A/A	Initial registration statement for open-end management investment companies (and amendment thereto)
N-2, N-2/A	Initial filing of a registration statement on Form N-2 for closed-end investment companies (and amendment thereto)
N-23C-2, N23C-2/A	Notice by closed-end investment companies of intention to call or redeem their own securities (and amendment thereto)
N-23C3A, N-23C3A/A	Notification of periodic repurchase offer Filed pursuant to Rule 23c-3(b) only (and amendment thereto)
N-23C3B	
N-23C3C, N-23C3C/A	
N-2MEF	
N-3	Initial registration statement on Form N-3 for separate accounts (management investment companies)
N-30B-2	Periodic and interim reports mailed to investment company shareholders
N-30D, N-30D/A	Initial annual and semi-annual reports mailed to investment company shareholders (and amendment thereto)
N-4, N-4/A	Initial registration statement on Form N-4 for separate accounts (unit investment trusts) (and amendment thereto)
N-54A	Notification of election by business development companies
N-54C, N-54C/A	Notification of election by business development companies (and amendment thereto)
N-6, N-6/A	Registration statement for separate accounts (and amendment thereto)
N-6F	Notice of intent by business development companies to elect to be subject to Sections 55 through 65 of the 1940 Act filed on Form N-6F
N-8A, N-8A/A	Initial notification of registration under section 8(a) filed on Form N-8A (and amendment thereto)
N-8B-2, N-8B-2/A	Initial registration statement for unit investment trusts (and amendment thereto)
N-8F, N-8F/A	Application for deregistration made on Form N-8F (and amendment thereto)
N-CSR, N-CSR/A	Certified annual shareholder report of registered management investment companies (and amendment thereto)
N-CSRS, N-CSRS/A	Certified semi-annual shareholder report of registered management investment companies (and amendment thereto)
N-MFP	Monthly schedule of portfolio holdings of money market funds
N-PX, N-PX/A	Annual report of proxy voting record of registered management investment company (and amendment thereto)
N-Q, N-Q/A	Quarterly schedule of portfolio holdings of registered management investment company (and amendment thereto)
NO ACT	
NSAR-A, NSAR-A/A	Semi-annual report for management companies (and amendment thereto)
NSAR-AT	
NSAR-B, NSAR-B/A	Annual report for management companies (and amendment thereto)
NSAR-BT, NSAR-BT/A	Transitional annual report filed on Form NSAR (and amendment thereto)
NSAR-U, NSAR-U/A	Annual report for unit investment trusts (and amendment thereto)
NT 10-K, NT 10-K/A	Notice under Rule 12b25 of inability to timely file all or part of a Form 10-K, 10-KSB, or 10KT (and amendment thereto)
NT 10-Q, NT 10-Q/A	Notice under Rule 12b25 of inability to timely file all or part of a Form 10-Q or 10-QSB
NT 11-K	Notice under Rule 12b25 of inability to timely file all or part of a Form 11-K
NT 15D2	
NT 20-F, NT 20-F/A	Notice under Rule 12b25 of inability to timely file all or part of an annual report of Form 20-F (and amendment thereto)
NT-NCSR, NT-NCSR/A	Notice under Exchange Act Rule 12b-25 of inability to timely file Form N-CSR (annual or semi-annual report) (and amendment thereto)
NT-NSAR, NT-NSAR/A	Notice under Exchange Act Rule 12b-25 of inability to timely file Form N-SAR (and amendment thereto)
NTFNCSR	
NTFNSAR	
NTN 10K	
NTN 10Q	
NTN 20F	
POS 8C	Post-effective amendment by closed-end investment companies
POS AM	Post-effective amendment to a registration statement that is not immediately effective upon filing
POS AMI	Post-effective amendment
POS EX	Post-effective amendment filed solely to add exhibits to a registration statement
POS462B	Post-effective amendment to Securities Act Rule 462(b) registration statement
POS462C	Post-effective amendment to a registration statement filed under Rule 462(c)
POSASR	Post-effective amendment to an automatic shelf registration statement on Form S-3ASR or Form F-3ASR
PRE 14A	Preliminary proxy statement not related to a contested matter or merger/acquisition
PRE 14C	Preliminary information statement not related to a contested matter or merger/acquisition
PREC14A	Preliminary proxy statement in connection with contested solicitations
PREC14C	Preliminary information statements - contested solicitations
PREM14A	Preliminary proxy statements relating to merger or acquisition
PREM14C	Preliminary information statements relating to merger or acquisition
PREN14A	Preliminary proxy statement filed by non-management
PRER14A	Preliminary revised proxy soliciting materials
PRER14C	Preliminary revised information statements
PRRN14A	Revised preliminary proxy statement filed by non-management
PX14A6G	Notice of exempt solicitation
PX14A6N	
QRTLYRPT	Periodic Development Bank filing, submitted quarterly
REG-NR	
REGDEX, REGDEX/A	Regulation D exemption filing (and amendment thereto)
RW	Registration withdrawal request
RW WD	Withdrawal of a registration withdrawal request
S-1, S-1/A	IPO registration (and amendment thereto)
S-11, S-11/A	Registration statement for securities to be issued by real estate companies (and amendment thereto)
S-11MEF	A new registration statement filed under Rule 462(b) to add securities to a prior related effective registration statement filed on Form S-11
S-1MEF	A new registration statement filed under Rule 462(b) to add securities to a prior related effective registration statement filed on Form S-1
S-3, S-3/A	Registration statement for specified transactions by certain issuers (and amendment thereto)
S-3ASR	Automatic shelf registration statement of securities of well-known seasoned issuers
S-3D	Automatically effective registration statement for securities issued pursuant to dividend or interest reinvestment plans
S-3DPOS	Post-effective amendment to a S-3D registration statement
S-3MEF	A new registration statement filed under Rule 462(b) to add securities to a prior related effective registration statement filed on Form S-3
S-4, S-4/A	Registration of securities issued in business combination transactions (and amendment thereto)
S-4 POS	Post-effective amendment to a S-4EF registration statement
S-4EF, S-4EF/A	
S-4MEF	A new registration statement filed under Rule 462(b) to add securities to a prior related effective registration statement filed on Form S-4
S-6, S-6/A	Initial registration statement filed on Form S-6 for unit investment trusts (and amendment thereto)
S-8	Initial registration statement for securities to be offered to employees pursuant to employee benefit plans
S-8 POS	Post-effective amendment to a S-8 registration statement
S-B, S-B/A	Registration statement for securities of foreign governments and subdivisions (and amendment thereto)
S-BMEF	A new registration statement filed under Rule 462(b) to add securities to a prior related effective registration statement filed on Form SB-1
SB-1, SB-1/A	
SB-2, SB-2/A	
SB-2MEF	
SC 13D, SC 13D/A	Schedule filed to report acquisition of beneficial ownership of more than 5% of a class of equity securities (and amendment thereto)
SC 13E3, SC 13E3/A	Schedule filed to report going private transactions (and amendment thereto)
SC 13G, SC 13G/A	Schedule filed to report acquisition of beneficial ownership of more than 5% of a class of equity securities by passive investors and certain institutions (and amendment thereto)
SC 14D9, SC 14D9/A	Tender offer solicitation/recommendation statements filed under Rule 14d-9 (and amendment thereto)
SC 14F1, SC14F1/A	Statement regarding change in majority of directors pursuant to Rule 14f-1 (and amendment thereto)
SC TO-C	Written communication relating to an issuer or third party tender offer
SC TO-I, SC TO-I/A	Issuer tender offer statement (and amendment thereto)
SC TO-T, SC TO-T/A	Third party tender offer statement (and amendment thereto)
SC13E4F, SC13E4F/A	Issuer tender offer statement filed pursuant to Rule 13(e)(4) by foreign issuers (and amendment thereto)
SC14D1F, SC14D1F/A	Third party tender offer statement filed pursuant to Rule 14d-1(b) by foreign issuers (and amendment thereto)
SC14D9C	Written communication by the subject company relating to a third party tender offer
SC14D9F, SC14D9F/A	
SE	
SP 15D2	
SUPPL	Voluntary supplemental material filed pursuant to Section 11(a) of the Securities Act of 1933 by foreign issuers
T-3, T-3/A	Initial application for qualification of trust indentures (and amendment thereto)
TA-1, TA-1/A	Application for registration as a transfer agent filed pursuant to the Securities Exchange Act of 1934 (and amendment thereto)
TA-2, TA-2/A	Annual report of transfer agent activities filed pursuant to the Securities Exchange Act of 1934 (and amendment thereto)
TA-W	Notice of withdrawal from registration as transfer agent filed pursuant to the Securities Exchange Act of 1934
TTW	
UNDER	
UPLOAD	
WDL-REQ	
X-17A-5, X-17A-5/A	

=== See also ===
- Form 10-K405

== Form suffixes ==
Suffix	Description
A	Amendment to a previous filing (i.e. Schedule 13D becomes Schedule 13D/A)
POS	Post-effective amendment to a previous filing (i.e. S-3D becomes S-3DPOS)
SB	Small business filing (i.e. a Form 10K becomes a Form 10K/SB)
T	Transitional (when changing fiscal year, i.e. 10K becomes 10KT)

== Finding forms ==
All forms are filed with the SEC, and many can be found for free in the SEC's EDGAR database. There are also several other portals that specialize in sorting information found in individual forms, such as the financial search engine, AlphaSense. New platforms leveraging AI, like wiseek.ai, stockinsights.ai, are emerging to provide advanced features to navigate these filings.

Forms which are not found in EDGAR include Form PF, which is used for private funds and is kept confidential per the Dodd–Frank Act.
