= Area of operations =

American military term

In U.S. armed forces parlance, an area of operations (AO) is an operational area defined by the force commander for land, air, and naval forces' conduct of combat and non-combat activities. Areas of operations do not typically encompass the entire operational area of the force commander, but should be large enough for subordinate commanders to accomplish their goals, achieve objectives and missions, and to protect their forces. Within an AO there will typically be one main supply route along which vehicles, personnel and supplies will be transported.

== See also ==
- Area of responsibility
