= Form 10-12B =

U.S. SEC filing to register securities

Form 10-12B is a U.S. SEC filing used to register securities pursuant to Section 12(b) of the Securities Exchange Act of 1934 in the United States.

== Form uses ==
This form is one of the most useful of the security registration forms because it relates to securities created as a result of a spin-off.

== Reading the form ==
There are three major portions of the 10-12B form:

- Letter to Shareholders from Parent Company - This provides a history of the parent company, their reason for the spin-off, and other relevant information.
- Information Statement - This section contains all the information investors need to know. Occasionally, portions of this section will be left blank and amended (with 10-12B/A filings) at a later time.
- Financial Information - This section contains all the financial information, including pro-forma statements. These statements show what the financials would look like if the spun off division were its own company in the past.
