= Form 4 =

Insider trading form in the US

Form 4 is a United States SEC filing that relates to insider trading. Every director, officer and owner of more than 10 percent of a class of a particular company's equity securities registered under Section 12 of the Securities Exchange Act of 1934 must file with the United States Securities and Exchange Commission a statement of ownership regarding such security. The initial filing is on Form 3 and changes are reported on Form 4. The annual statement of beneficial ownership of securities is on Form 5. The forms contain information on the reporting person's relationship to the company and on purchases and sales of such equity securities.

Form 4 is stored in SEC's EDGAR database and academic researchers make these reports freely available as structured datasets in the Harvard Dataverse.

Reporting persons generally must file Form 4 by the end of the second business day after a transaction subject to Section 16(a) is executed.

== Transaction codes ==
Each transaction listed on the Form 4 filing has a transaction code:

General transaction codes

- P – Open market or private purchase of securities
- S – Open market or private sale of securities
- V – Transaction voluntarily reported earlier than required

Rule 16b-3 transaction codes

- A – Grant, award, or other acquisition
- D – Sale (or disposition) back to the issuer of the securities
- F – Payment of exercise price or tax liability by delivering or withholding securities
- I – Discretionary transaction, which is an order to the broker to execute the transaction at the best possible price
- M – Exercise or conversion of derivative security

Derivative securities codes

- C – Conversion of derivative security (usually options)
- E – Expiration of short derivative position (usually options)
- H – Expiration (or cancellation) of long derivative position with value received (usually options)
- O – Exercise of out-of-the-money derivative securities (usually options)
- X – Exercise of in-the-money or at-the-money derivatives securities (usually options)

Other sections 16b exempt transactions and small acquisition codes

- G – Bona fide gift form of any clauses
- L – Small acquisition
- W – Acquisition or disposition by will or laws of descent and distribution
- Z – Deposit into or withdrawal from voting trust

Other transaction codes

- J – Other acquisition or disposition (transaction described in footnotes)
- K – Transaction in equity swap or similar instrument
- U – Disposition due to a tender of shares in a change of control transaction

== Resources ==
- Official SEC website
- Latest Form 4 filings in SEC Edgar database
