= 4F =

4F or 4-F may refer to:

- 4F (company), a Polish sportswear company
- 4-F classification in the US Selective Service System, identifying a person as unfit for military service
- 4F correlator, in Fourier optics
- The 4f electron shell
- Section 4(f) of the United States DOT act of 1966, which regulates acquiring park and historic properties for transportation use.
- 4F case, a 4 February 2006 controversial criminal case in Barcelona
- Flottille 4F a French naval aviation squadron
- LMS Fowler Class 4F, a class of 0-6-0 steam locomotive
- February 1992 Venezuelan coup d'état attempt, known in Venezuela as "4F".

== See also ==
- F4 (disambiguation)
- Four Fs (disambiguation)
