= Form N-1A =

Form N-1A is a registration statement used by investment companies to create new open-end mutual funds. A company must file this form with the Securities and Exchange Commission's EDGAR filing system.

Companies file an N-1A under the Investment Company Act of 1940 if they wish to register shares of the mutual fund. They file it under the Securities Act of 1933 if they wish to offer shares to customers.
