= F-4 Object =

Nuclear shelter in Budapest, Hungary

- F-4 objektum (F/4 objektum, Rákosi-bunker)
- Budapest, Hungary
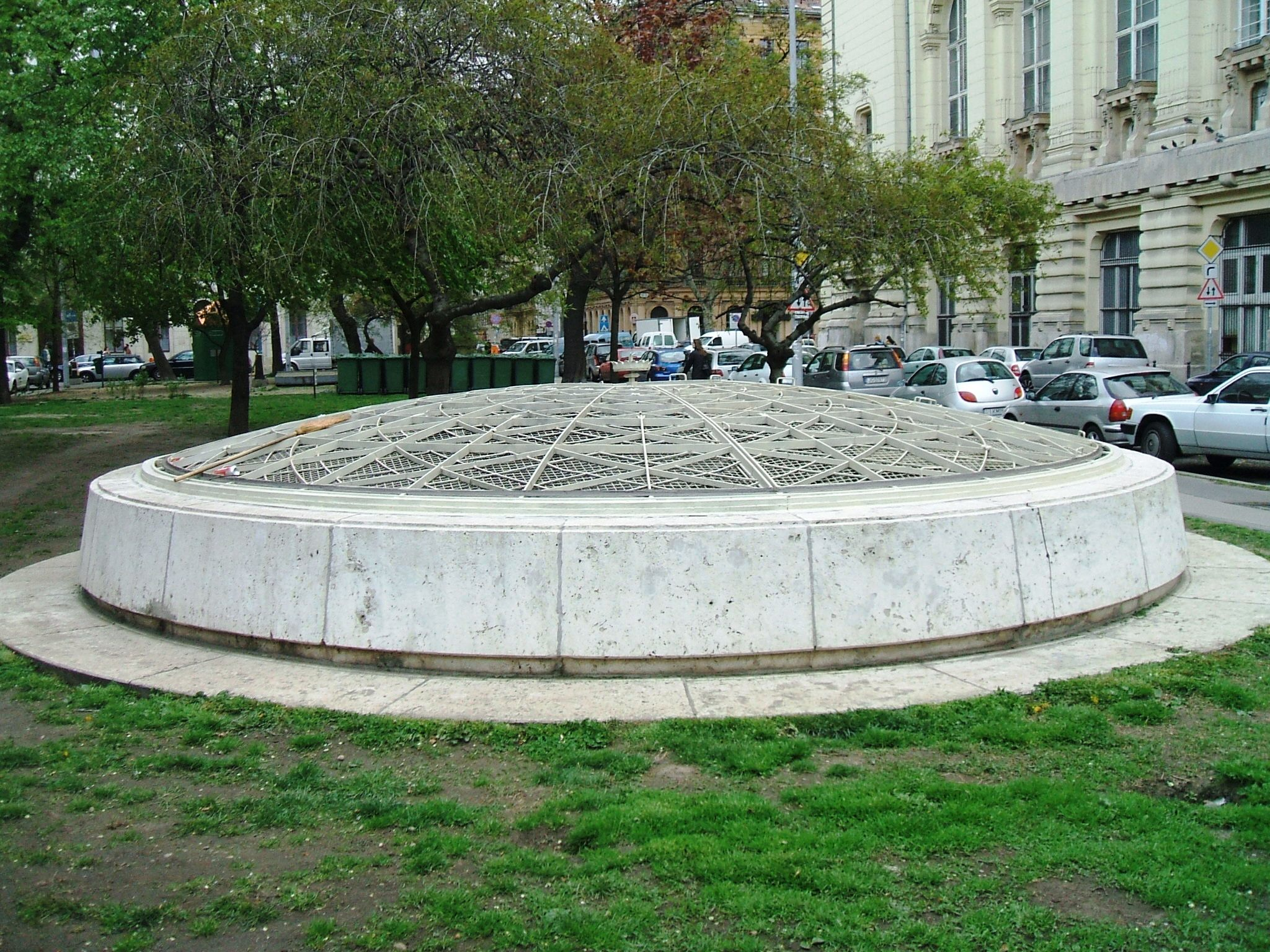
- The emergency exit and air vent next to the former headquarters of the Hungarian Television (Szabadság tér)

Site information
- Controlled by: Hungary, Budapest Transportation Company (BKV)

Location
- Coordinates: 47°30′11″N 19°02′59″E

Site history
- Built: May 1, 1952–1963
- In use: never

The F-4 Object (publicly often known as the Rákosi-bunker, Hungarian: F-4 objektum/Rákosi-bunker) is a formerly secret nuclear shelter under the downtown of Budapest. It is located 45-50 metres below the surface, several kilometres long approximately in a "H" shape between Kossuth tér and Szabadság tér. It has a direct connection to the Line 2 of the Budapest Metro and a closed tunnel to the Hungarian Parliament Building. According to other sources, the bunker has a connection with the former headquarters of the Hungarian Working People's Party (located over the structure), and there is no tunnel to the Parliament Building.

== History ==
Its construction began in 1952 parallel with the metro. Its goal was to provide shelter to Mátyás Rákosi and the Central Committee members of the Hungarian Working People's Party in case of a possible nuclear raid, as well as to provide space for offices of the Parliament. When the danger is over, they were supposed to take the metro to Eastern railway station and then change to an armoured train. It was made technologically similarly to a metro (it resembles metro stations and tunnels), so the workers were informed they were building the metro. According to rumours, hundreds of prisoners worked at the construction, while in fact this work was done by miners.

The object, suitable to accommodate 2,200 people, with an area of 3,500–3,800 square metres, was completed in 1962 or 1963. It was equipped with an air filtering mechanism with a capacity of 4,000 cubic metres, appropriate to filter out radioactive dust. A water reservoir of 150 cubic metres and a generator was also installed, capable of producing 30 kW of electricity. An emergency exit was created next to the Hungarian Television headquarters, also serving for ventilation. The object, resembling a labyrinth, houses a separate council hall, intended for the leaders of the country to debate the current tasks. Though never used, it was kept at the ready until the mid-1970s.

The shelter was revealed to the public in the 1994 documentary film titled Pincebörtön (Cellar Prison) by Zoltán Dézsi.

== Present state ==
Its status has considerably degraded. However, the ventilator, the generator, and the other technical appliances work properly, they are maintained regularly and checked every week. Former furniture and equipment were carried away as early as during the détente of the Cold War. Since then, it has been completely empty and unused. It is owned by the state and controlled by the BKV (Budapest Transport Company). It is visited by BKV's maintenance personnel every week, and its technical appliances are checked for functioning.

The entrance of the shelter is available from the inner courtyard of a Classicistic block of flats in Lipótváros (Steindl Imre utca 12.), this is where the high concrete cylinder can be found from which it is possible to reach the shelter by an elevator or by stairs – there are 283 stairs leading down to the depth. This courtyard can be accessed through the iron gate in the courtyard of the house on the opposite side (Zoltán utca 13.). Earlier, it was qualified as a strategically strictly confidential object of civil defence. Its visit was strictly regulated, and it was only to be seen after signing a statement of secrecy.

One of the entrances to the shelter was pulled down in 2009. The total number of entrances and tunnels is unknown.

== Gallery ==
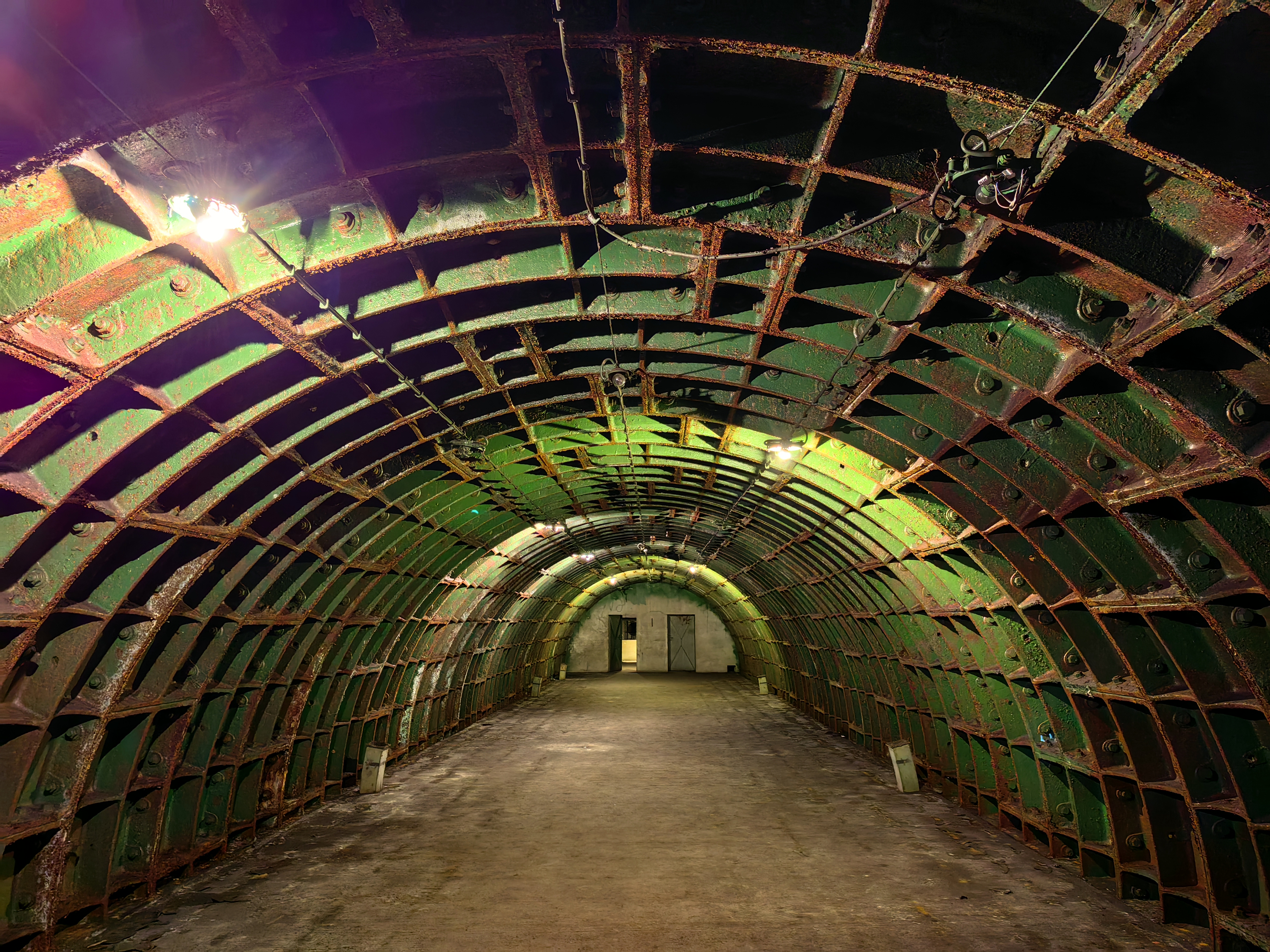

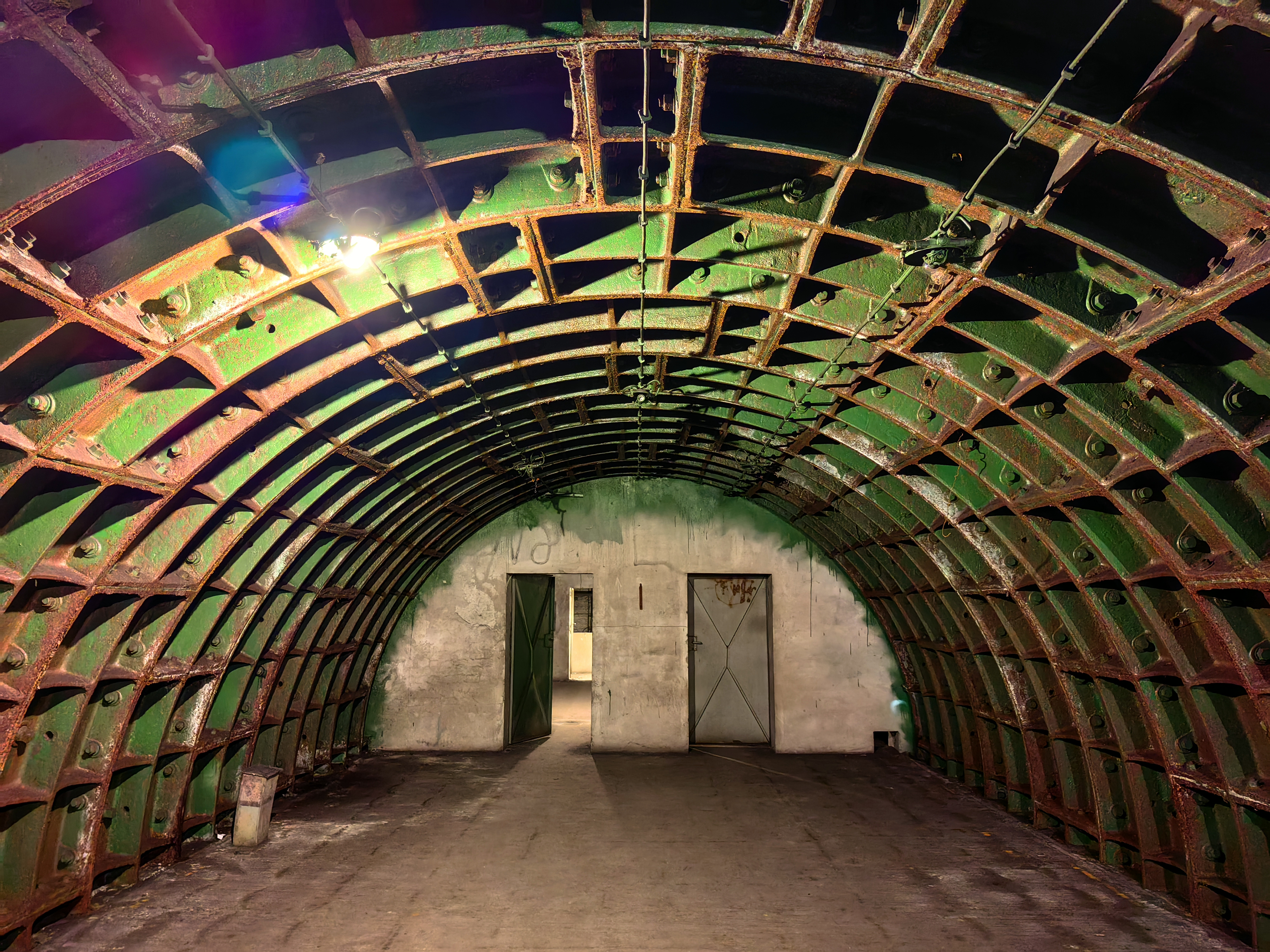

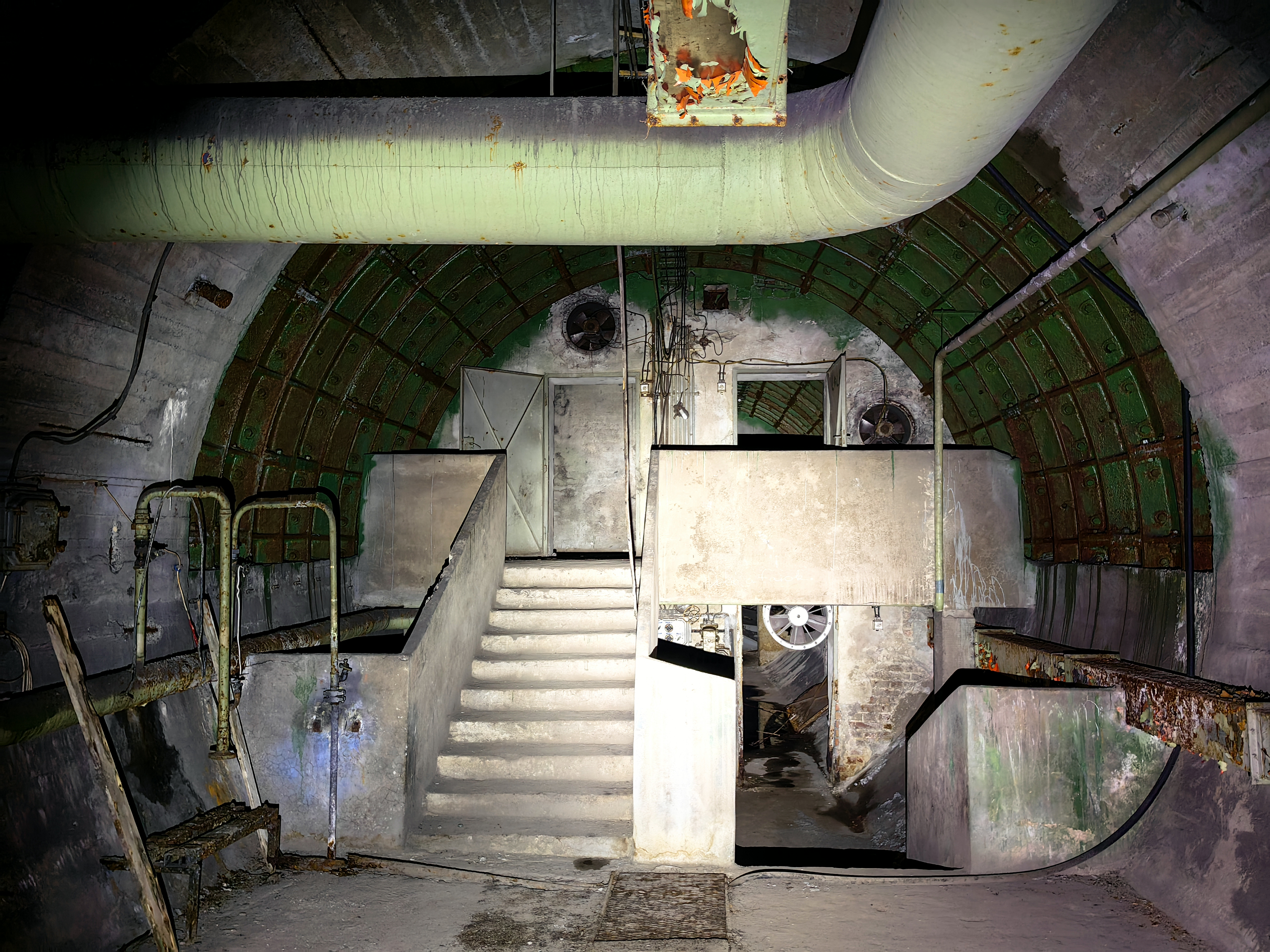

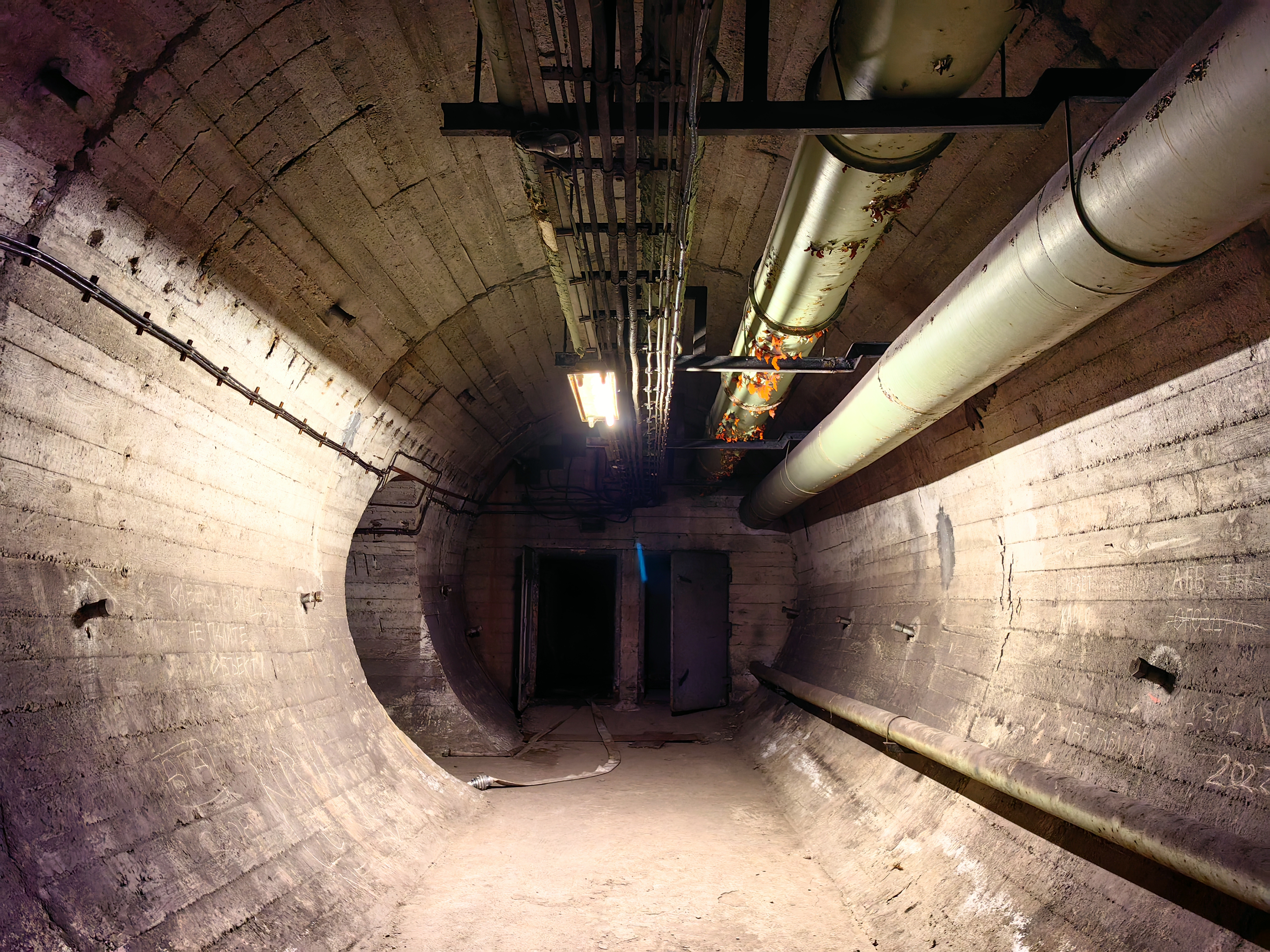

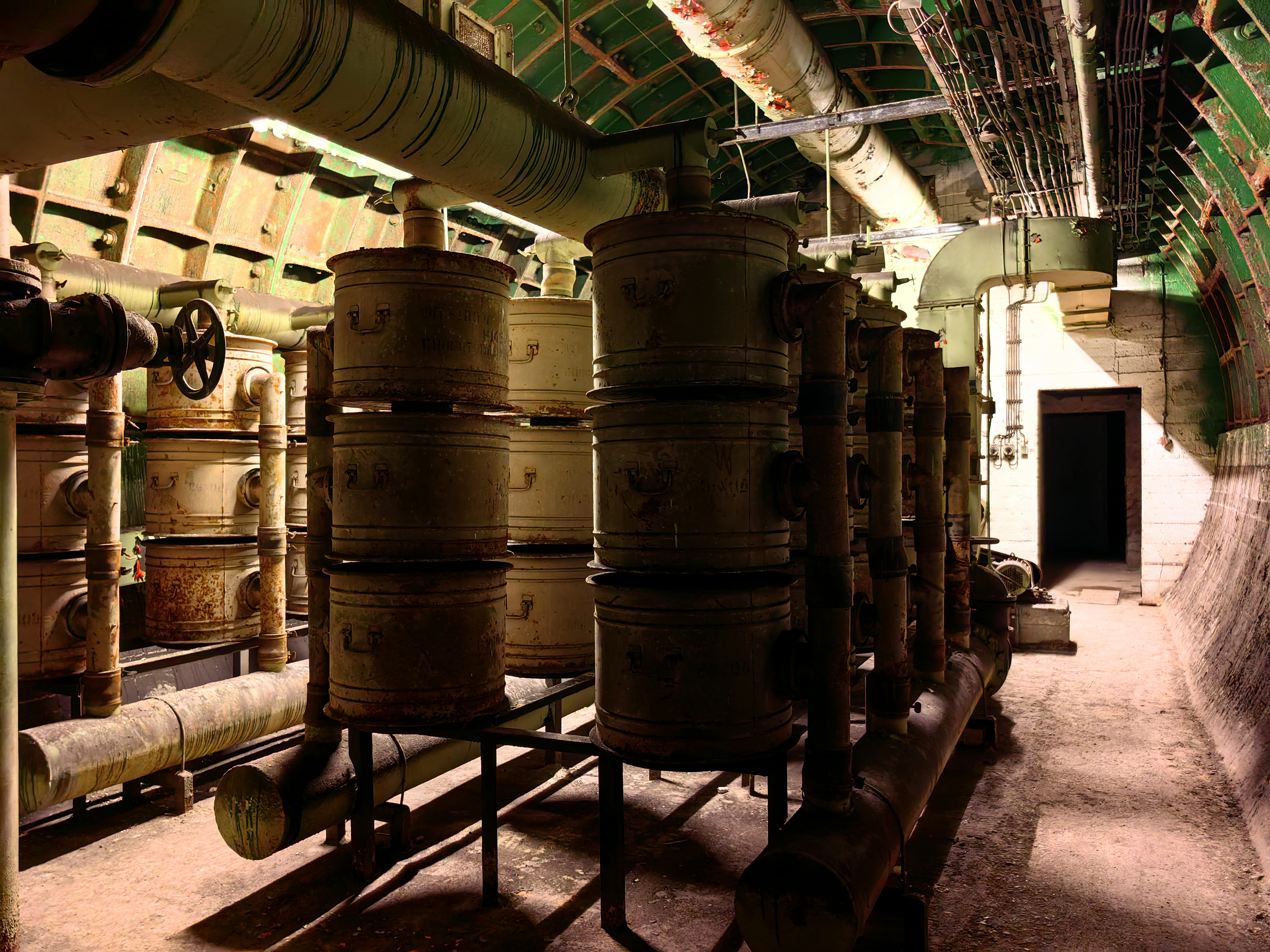

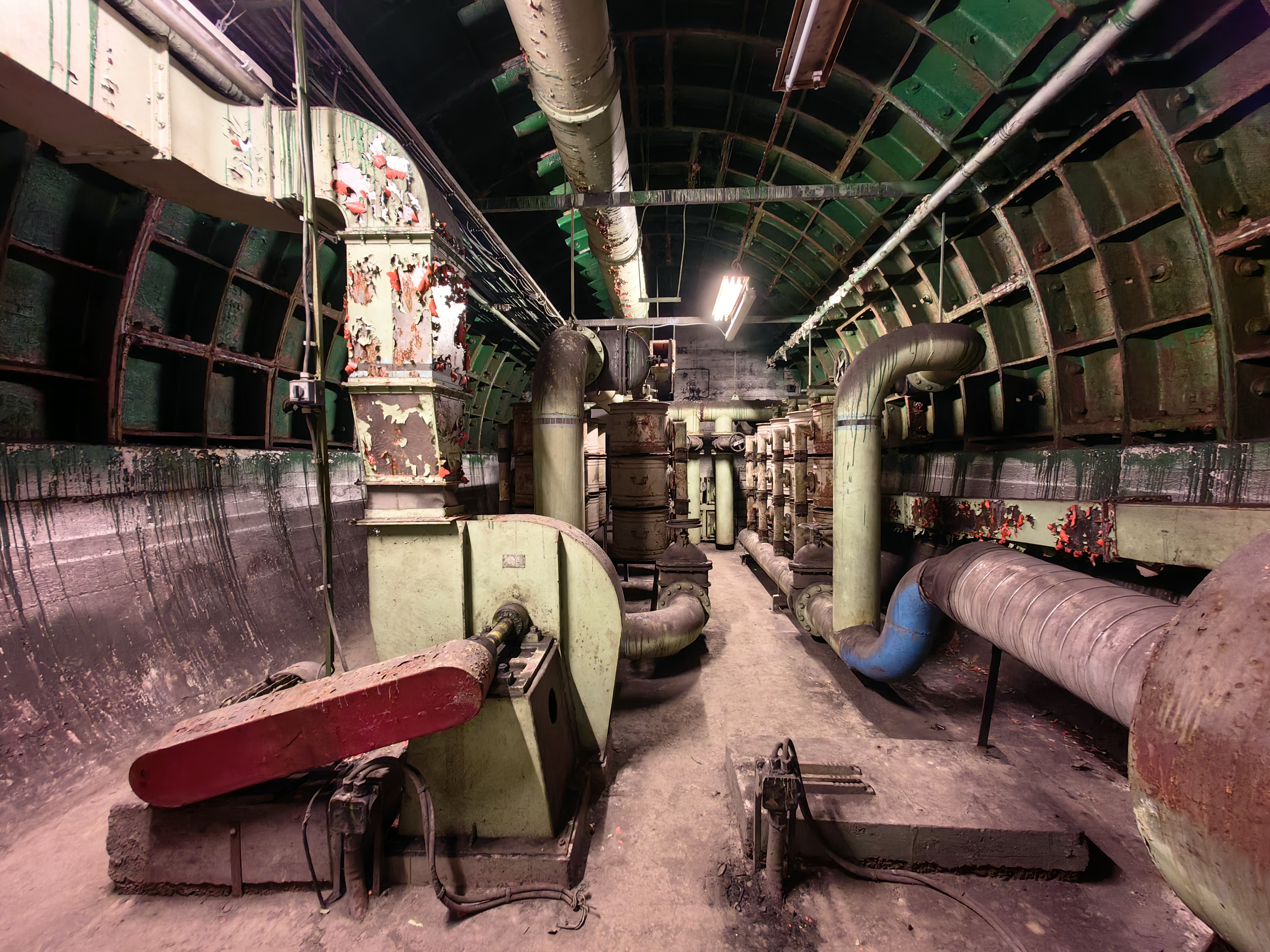

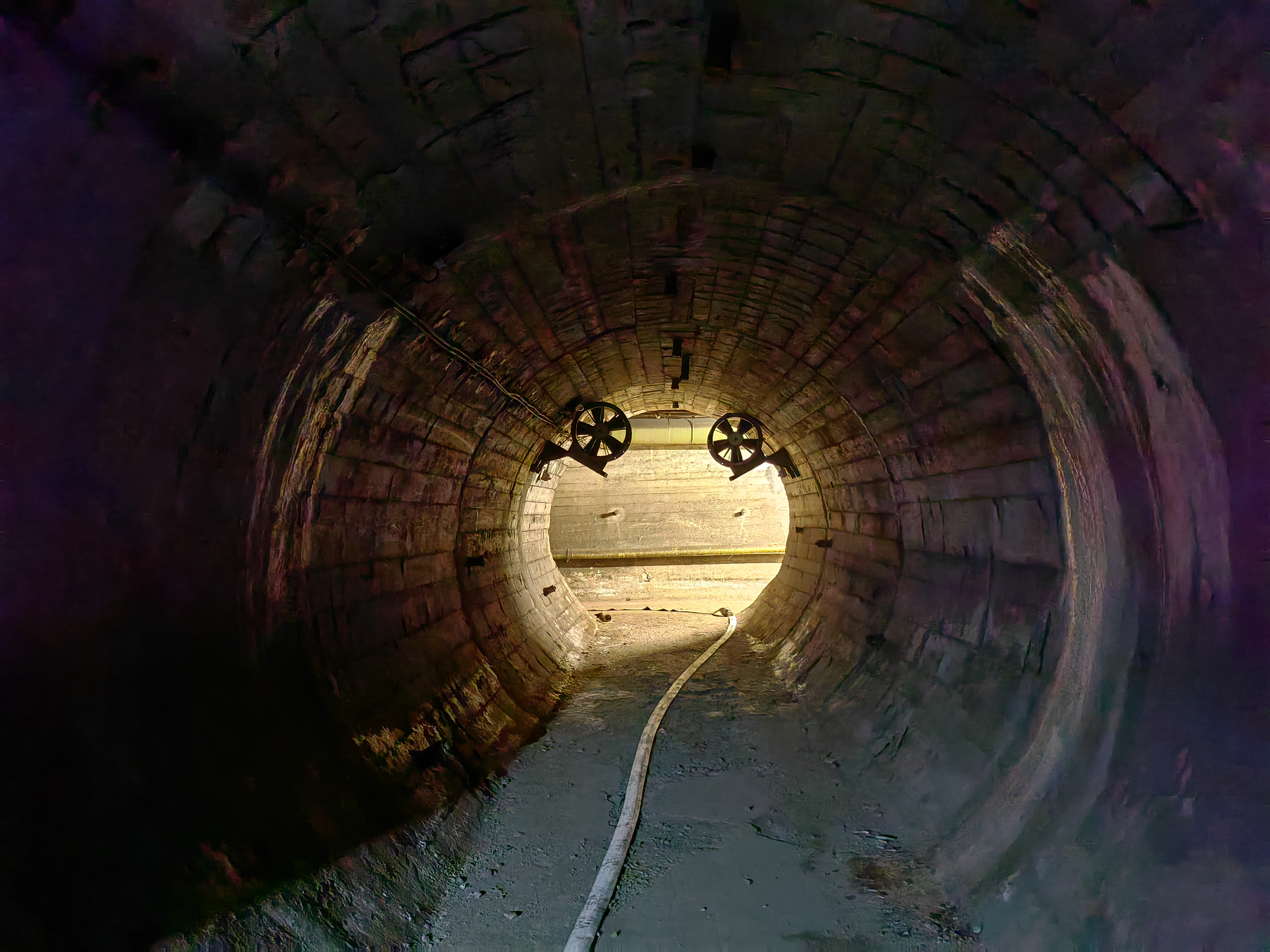

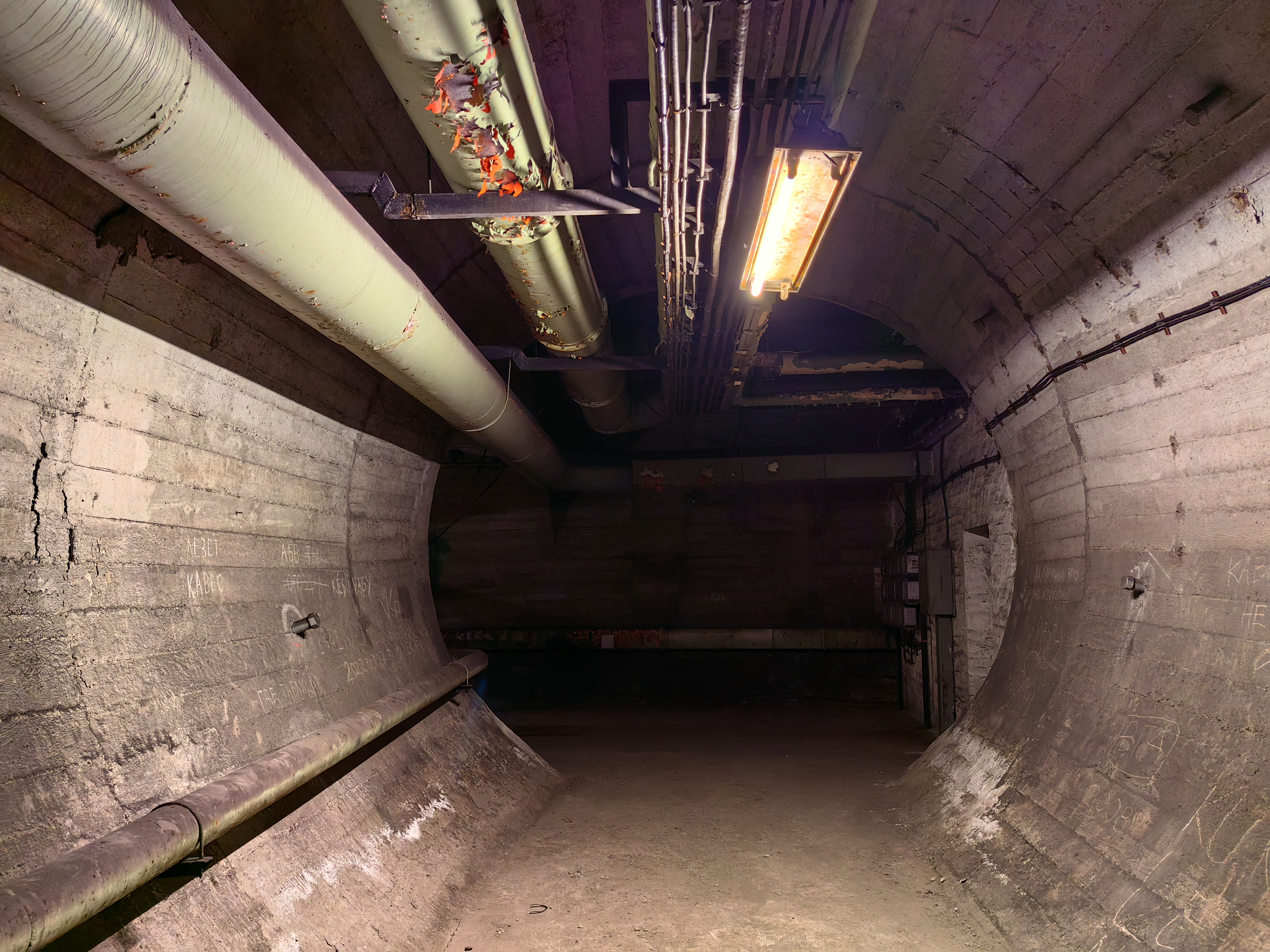

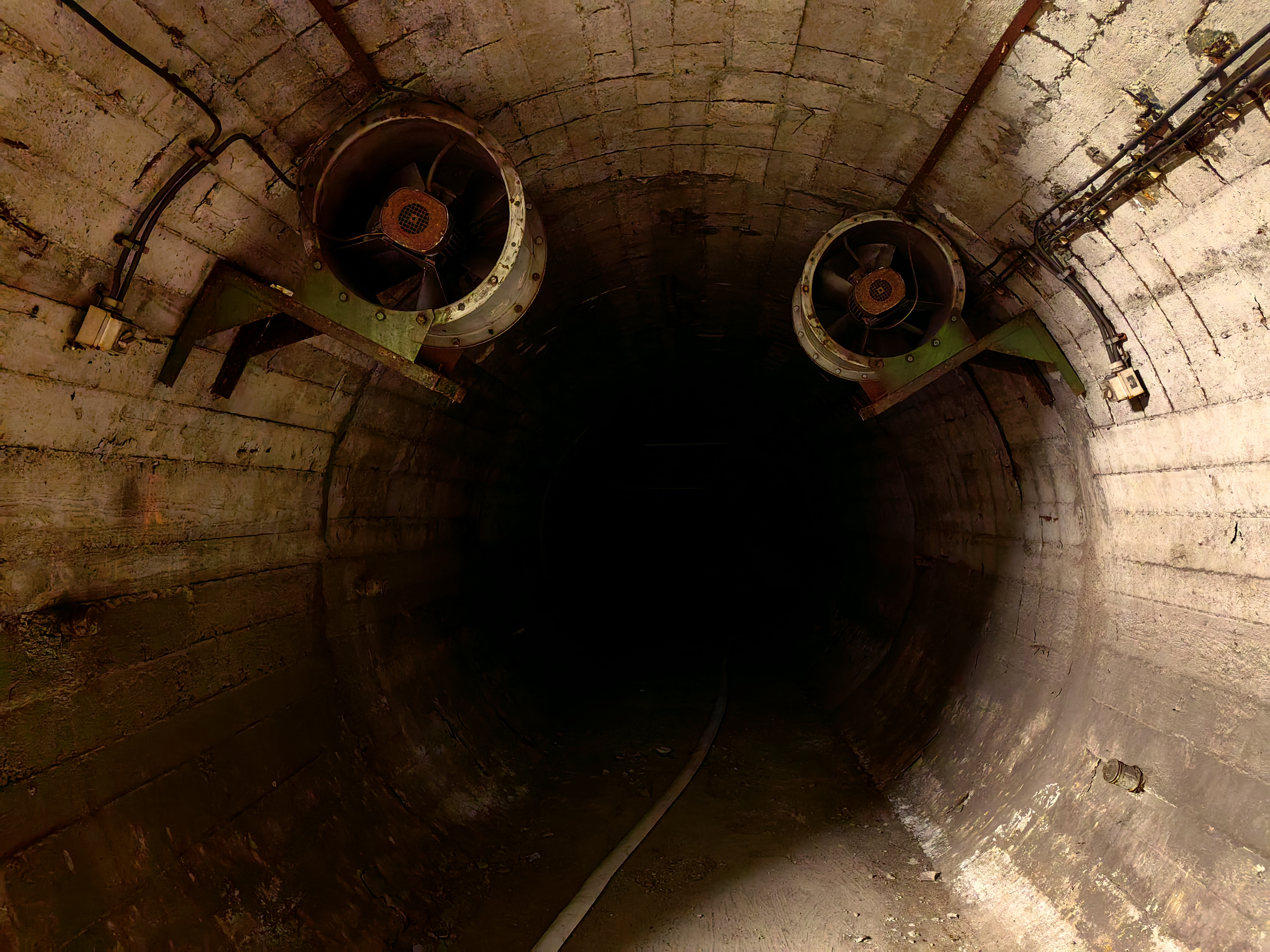

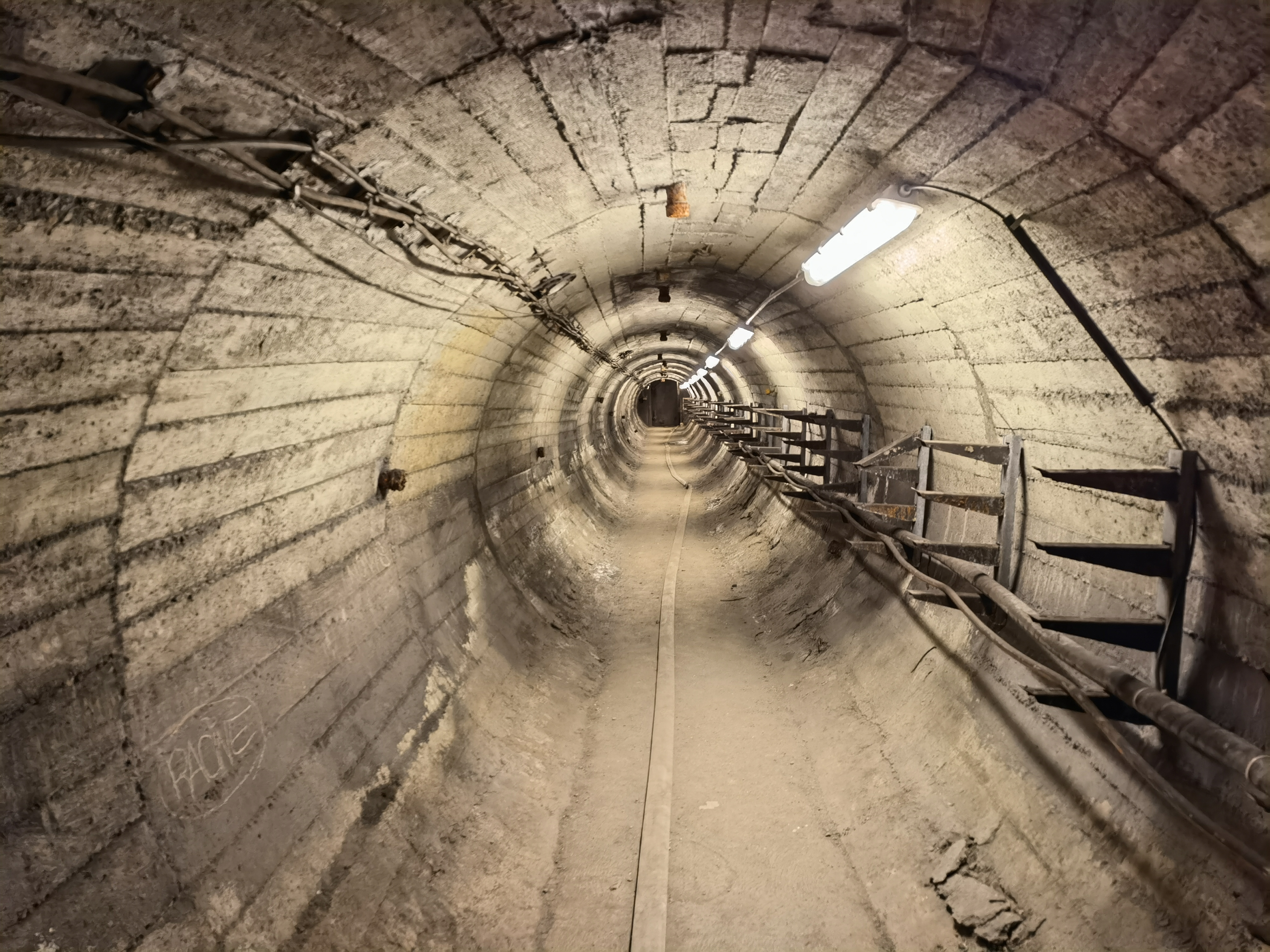
