= Albarka Air =

Nigerian airline

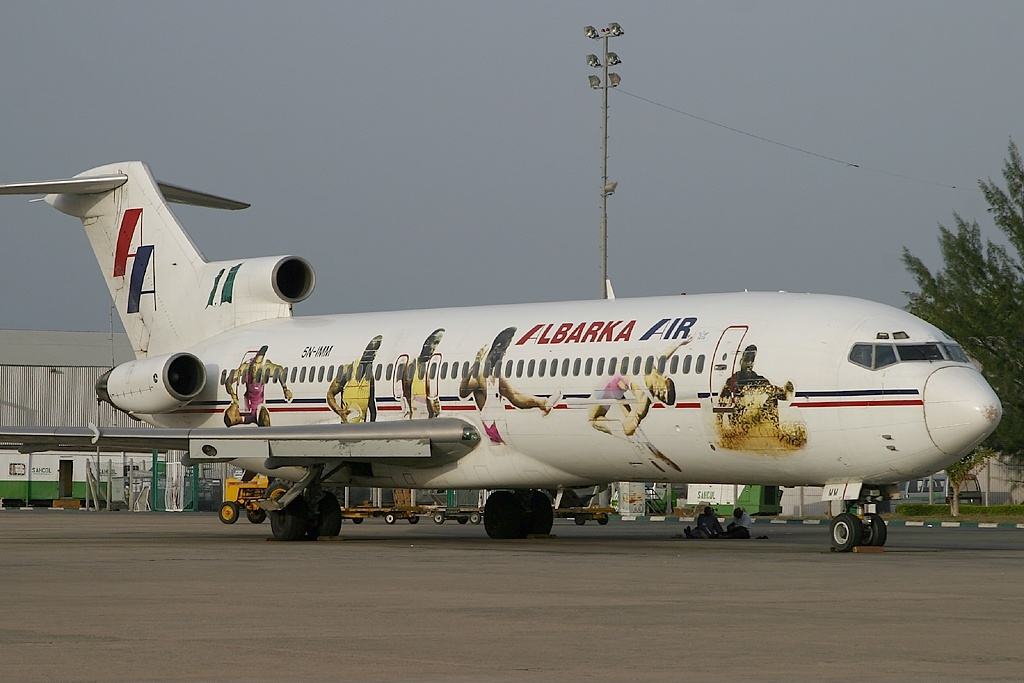
IATA	ICAO	Call sign
F4	NBK	AL-AIR
- Founded: 1999
- Commenced operations: March 2000
- Ceased operations: April 30, 2007
- Operating bases: Nnamdi Azikiwe International Airport,
- Fleet size: See Fleet below
- Destinations: See Destinations below
- Headquarters: Abuja, Nigeria
- Key people: Buba Marwa (wwner)

Albarka Air was an airline based in Abuja, Nigeria. It operated scheduled and charter services within Nigeria and charters to other countries in central and west Africa. Its main base was Nnamdi Azikiwe International Airport, Abuja. It operated from 2002 until 2007.

== History ==
Albarka Air was founded in 1999 and commenced operations in March of 2000. In 2002 it's BAC 1-11 fleet was retired from service. In 2007 the Nigerian government set a deadline of April 30, 2007 for all airlines operating in the country to re-capitalise or be grounded, in an effort to "ensuring better services and safety" for Nigerian airlines. The airline did not pass this and ceased operations on April 30 2007.

== Destinations ==
Albarka Air PLC provided on-demand air charter services.
