= Shelf registration =

Registration arrangement for the sale of securities

Shelf registration, shelf offering, or shelf prospectus is a type of public offering allowing certain issuers to offer and sell securities to the public without a separate prospectus for each act of offering and without the issue of further prospectuses. Instead, there is a single prospectus for multiple, undefined future offerings. The prospectus (often as part of a registration statement) may be used to offer securities for up to several years after its publication. A shelf registration statement is a filing with the SEC to register a public offering, usually when there is no present intention to immediately sell all the securities being registered. The statement permits multiple offerings based on the same registration.

For example, a company can file a shelf registration statement with a prospectus for 100,000,000 shares, $1,000,000,000 face value of bonds, $500,000,000 face value of convertible bonds, 50,000,000 Series A warrants, and 50,000,000 Series B warrants. These five different classes or series of securities are offered in a single document. The company may offer to sell all of them, none of them, or any part of all or some class. It can sell 30,000,000 shares at one time and another 50,000,000 a year later; it will then have 20,000,000 unissued shares covered by the shelf prospectus.

Shelf registration is mostly used for sales of new securities by the issuer (primary offerings), although it may also be used for resales of outstanding securities (secondary offerings) or a combination of both. Before each offering and sale is actually made, the company must file a relatively short statement regarding material changes in its business and finances since the shelf prospectus was filed.

Shelf registration is usually available to companies deemed reliable by the securities regulation authority in the relevant country. Because of their purposefully time-constrained nature, shelf offerings are examined far less rigorously by those authorities than standard public offerings.

== United States ==
Shelf registration is a process authorized by the U.S. Securities and Exchange Commission under Rule 415 that allows a single registration document to be filed by a company that permits the issuance of multiple securities. Form S-3 issuers may use shelf registration to register securities that will be offered on an immediate, continuous or delayed basis.

In July 2005 the SEC put "automatic registration" shelf filings in place. This filing is a relaxed registration process that applies to well-known, seasoned issuers (WKSI, pronounced "wiksy"), and covers debt securities, common stock, preferred stock and warrants, among other various instruments. A WKSI is a company that has filed all annual, quarterly and current reports in a timely manner, and either has a greater than $700 million market capitalization or has issued $1 billion in registered debt offerings over the past three years.

Shelf registration is a registration of a new issue that can be prepared up to three years in advance, so that the issue can be offered quickly as soon as funds are needed or market conditions are favorable. For example, current market conditions in the housing market are not favorable for a specific firm to issue a public offering. In this case, it may not be a good time for a firm in the sector (e.g. a home builder) to come out with its second offering because many investors will be pessimistic about companies working in that sector. By using shelf registration, the firm can fulfill all registration-related procedures beforehand and go to market quickly when conditions become more favorable.

Finally, firms often use universal shelf filings and choose between debt and equity offerings based on the prevailing relative market conditions.
