= Four Fs (legal) =

The Four Fs is an informal term and mnemonic in English common law for fruit, fungi, flowers and foliage.

People can gather the Four Fs so long as it is for personal use, and not for sale or commercial gain. This does not mean that people can enter land unlawfully to do so, but in areas where they can lawfully be, for example on a country park, or walking along a right of way, they are entitled to collect and take away the Four Fs.

Like most common law this provision does not apply if some other legal provision over-rides it, for example the species in question is specially protected, say by listing in Schedule 8 of the Wildlife and Countryside Act 1981. The same act also prohibits uprooting of any wild plant without the landowner's permission, so the Four Fs only applies to picking, for example daisies in a public park; not to digging up, for example, bluebell bulbs or young trees. Another significant exception is that land made accessible through the Countryside and Rights of Way Act 2000 is not subject to these rights.

This principle was put into statute in the Theft Act 1968 which states: "A person who picks mushrooms growing wild on any land, or who pick flowers, fruit or foliage from a plant growing wild on any land, does not (although not in possession of the land) steal what he picks, unless he does it for reward or for sale or other commercial purpose. (For purposes of this subsection 'mushroom' includes any fungus, and 'plant' includes any shrub or tree.)"

Legal challenges to this right are unusual, and not always successful.
