= F4 (classification) =

Wheelchair sport classification

F4, also T4 and SP4, is a wheelchair sport classification that corresponds to the neurological level T1- T7. Historically, it was known as 1C Incomplete, 2 Complete, or Upper 3 Complete. People in this class have normal upper limb function, and functional issues with muscles below the nipple line.

There are comparable F4 classes in a number of sports. For athletics, these are T54 and F54. In cycling, these are H4 or H5. Swimming classes include S3, SB3, S4 and S5. The process for classification into this class has a medical and functional classification process. This process is often sport specific.

== Definition ==
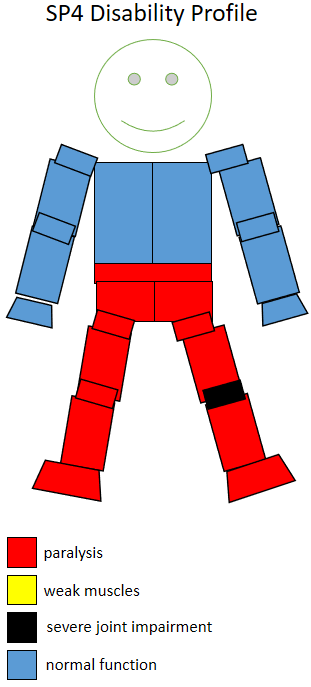
Functional profile of a wheelchair sportsperson in the F4 class.

This is wheelchair sport classification that corresponds to the neurological level T1- T7. In the past, this class was known as 1C Incomplete, 2 Complete, or Upper 3 Complete.

In 2002, USA Track & Field defined this class as, "These athletes have normal upper limb function as well as backward movement of the trunk, often with rotation movements of the trunk. They may use the trunk movements to steer around curves, and usually do not have to interrupt the pushing stroke rate around curves. When stopping quickly, the trunk moves toward an upright position. They are able to use their abdominals for power, particularly when starting, but also when pushing. Neurological level: T8-S2."

=== Neurological ===
Disabled Sports USA defined the neurological definition of this class in 2003 as T1 - T7. The location of lesions on different vertebrae tend to be associated with disability levels and functionality issues. T1 is associated with finger abductors. T6 is associated with abdominal innervation beginning.

=== Anatomical ===
People with a lesion at T6 have an impairment that effects the muscles in their body below the nipple line.

=== Functional ===
F4 sportspeople may have good sitting balance and some impairment in their dominant hand. Disabled Sports USA defined the functional definition of this class in 2003 as, "Have no sitting balance. [...] Usually hold onto part of the chair while throwing. Complete Class 2 and upper Class 3 Athletes have normal upper limbs. They can hold the throwing implement normally. They have no functional trunk movements.Incomplete 1C Athletes who have trunk movements, with hand function like F3." People in this class have a total respiratory capacity of 85% compared to people without a disability.

People with spinal injuries at T6 or higher are more likely to develop Autonomic dysreflexia (AD). It also sometimes rarely effects people with injuries at T7 and T8. The condition causes over-activity of the autonomic nervous system, and can suddenly onset when people are playing sports. Some of the symptoms include nausea, high blood pressure, a pounding headache, flushed face, profuse sweating, a lower heart rate or a nasal congestion. If left untreated, it can cause a stroke. Players in some sports like wheelchair rugby are encouraged to be particularly on guard for AD symptoms.

== Governance ==
In general, classification for spinal cord injuries and wheelchair sport is overseen by International Wheelchair and Amputee Sports Federation (IWAS), having taken over this role following the 2005 merger of ISMWSF and ISOD. From the 1950s to the early 2000s, wheelchair sport classification was handled International Stoke Mandeville Games Federation (ISMGF).

Some sports have classification managed by other organizations. In the case of athletics, classification is handled by IPC Athletics. Wheelchair rugby classification has been managed by the International Wheelchair Rugby Federation since 2010. Lawn bowls is handled by International Bowls for the Disabled. Wheelchair fencing is governed by IWAS Wheelchair Fencing (IWF). The International Paralympic Committee manages classification for a number of spinal cord injury and wheelchair sports including alpine skiing, biathlon, cross country skiing, ice sledge hockey, powerlifting, shooting, swimming, and wheelchair dance.

Some sports specifically for people with disabilities, like race running, have two governing bodies that work together to allow different types of disabilities to participate. Race running is governed by both the CPISRA and IWAS, with IWAS handling sportspeople with spinal cord related disabilities.

Classification is also handled at the national level or at the national sport specific level. In the United States, this has been handled by Wheelchair Sports, USA (WSUSA) who managed wheelchair track, field, slalom, and long-distance events. For wheelchair basketball in Canada, classification is handled by Wheelchair Basketball Canada.

== History ==
Early on in this classes history, the class had a different name and was based on medical classification and originally intended for athletics. During the 1960s and 1970s, classification involved being examined in a supine position on an examination table, where multiple medical classifiers would often stand around the player, poke and prod their muscles with their hands and with pins. The system had no built in privacy safeguards and players being classified were not insured privacy during medical classification nor with their medical records.

During the late 1960s, people oftentimes tried to cheat classification to get in classified more favorably. The group most likely to try to cheat at classification were wheelchair basketball players with complete spinal cord injuries located at the high thoracic transection of the spine. Starting in the 1980s and going into the 1990s, this class began to be more defined around functional classification instead of a medical one.

== Sports ==
=== Athletics ===
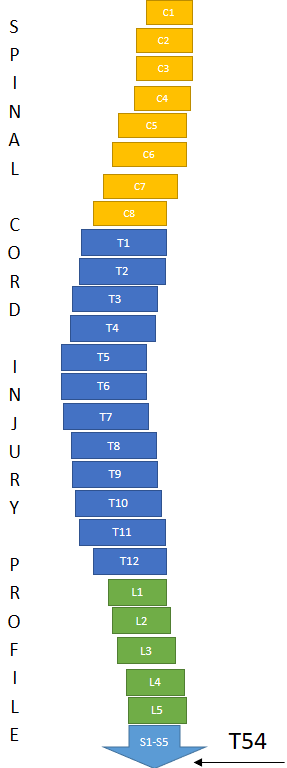
Visualization of where on the spinal cord an injury exists to be classified as T54.

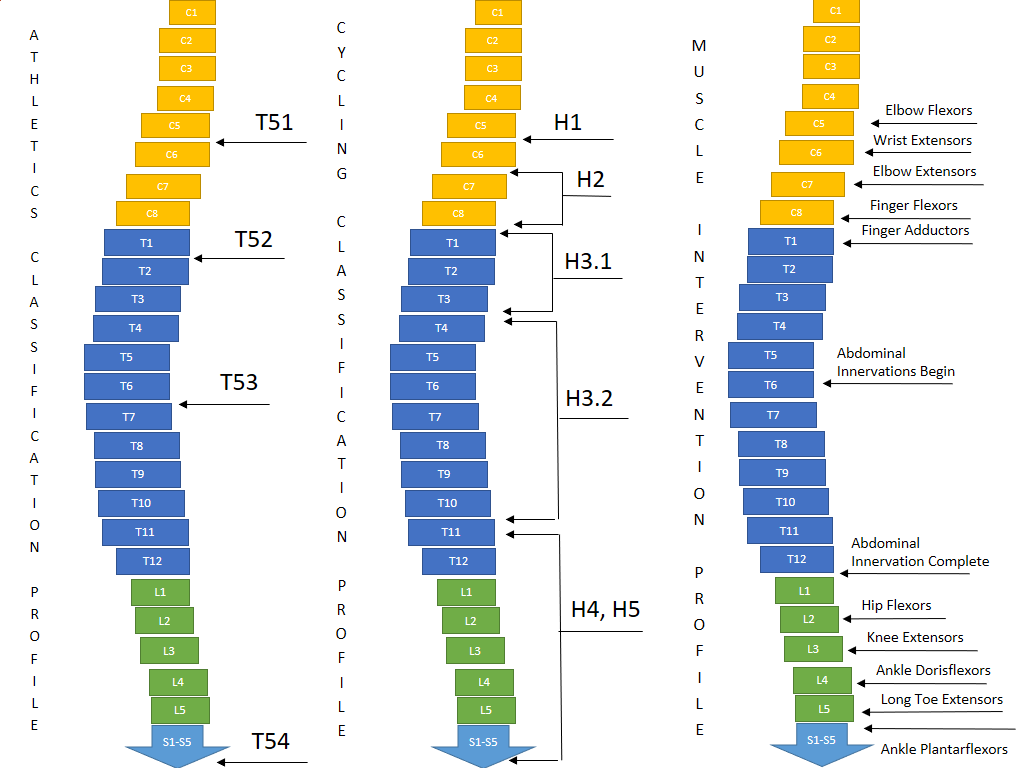
Comparing key muscle innervations for spinal cord levels compared to cycling and athletics classifications.

Under the IPC Athletics classification system, this class competes in T54 and F54. Field events open to this class have included shot put, discus and javelin. In pentathlon, the events for this class have included Shot, Javelin, 200m, Discus, 1500m.

Athletes in this class who good trunk control and mobility have an advantage over athletes in the same class who have less functional trunk control and mobility. This functional difference can cause different performance results within the same class, with discus throwers with more control in a class able to throw the discus further. Wheelchair racers in this class frequently are much faster than their able-bodied counterparts.

F4 athletes throw from a seated position, and use a javelin that weighs .6 kilograms (1.3 lb). The shot put used by women in this class weighs less than the traditional one at 3 kilograms (6.6 lb).

There are performance differences and similarities between this class and other wheelchair classes. A study of javelin throwers in 2003 found that F4 throwers have angular speeds of the shoulder girdle similar to that of F3 to F9 throwers. For people in the F2, F3 and F4 classes in the discus, elbow flexion and shoulder horizontal abduction are equally important variables in the speed at which they release the discus. For F2, F3 and F4 discus throwers, the discus tends to be below shoulder height and the forearm level is generally above elbow height at the moment of release of the discus. F2 and F4 discus throwers have limited shoulder girdle range of motion. F2 to F4 discus throwers have good sitting balance while throwing. F5, F6 and F7 discus throwers have greater angular speed of the shoulder girdle during release of the discus than the lower number classes of F2, F3 and F4. F2 and F4 discus throwers have greater average angular forearm speed than F5 to F8 throwers. F2 and F4 speed is caused by use of the elbow flexion to compensate for the shoulder flexion advantage of F5 to F8 throwers.

A study of was done comparing the performance of athletics competitors at the 1984 Summer Paralympics. It found there was little significant difference in performance in distance between women in 1B (SP3) and 1C (SP3, SP4) in the shot put. It found there was little significant difference in performance in time between women in 1B (SP3) and 1C (SP3, SP4) in the 60 meter dash. It found there was little significant difference in performance in distance between women in 1A (SP1, SP2), 1B (SP3) and 1C (SP3, SP4) in the discus. It found there was little significant difference in performance in distance between women in 1A (SP1, SP2), 1B (SP3) and 1C (SP3, SP4) in the club throw. It found there was little significant difference in performance in time between women in 1C (SP3, SP4) and 2 (SP4) in the 60 m dash. It found there was little significant difference in performance in distance between men in 1C (SP3, SP4) and 2 (SP4) in the shot put. It found there was little significant difference in performance in time between men in 1C (SP3, SP4) and 2 (SP4) in the slalom. It found there was little significant difference in performance in distance between women in 1C (SP3, SP4), 2 (SP4) and 3 (SP4, SP5) in the javelin. It found there was little significant difference in performance in time between women in 1C (SP3, SP4), 2 (SP4) and 3 (SP4, SP5) in the 60 meters. It found there was little significant difference in performance in distance between women in 2 (SP4) and 3 (SP4, SP5) in the discus. It found there was little significant difference in performance in distance between women in 2 (SP4) and 3 (SP4, SP5) in the shot put. It found there was little significant difference in performance in time between women in 2 (SP4) and 3 (SP4, SP5) in the 60 meters. It found there was little significant difference in performance in time between women in 2 (SP4) and 3 (SP4, SP5) in the 200 meters. It found there was little significant difference in performance in time between women in 2 (SP4) and 3 (SP4, SP5) in the 400 meters. It found there was little significant difference in performance in time between women in 2 (SP4) and 3 (SP4, SP5) in the slalom. It found there was little significant difference in performance in distance between men in 2 (SP4) and 3 (SP4, SP5) in the discus. It found there was little significant difference in performance in distance between men in 2 (SP4) and 3 (SP4, SP5) in the javelin. It found there was little significant difference in performance in distance between men in 2 (SP4) and 3 (SP4, SP5) in the shot put. It found there was little significant difference in performance in time between men in 2 (SP4) and 3 (SP4, SP5) in the 100 meters. It found there was little significant difference in performance in time between men in 2 (SP4) and 3 (SP4, SP5) in the 200 meters. It found there was little significant difference in performance in time between men in 2 (SP4) and 3 (SP4, SP5) in the 400 meters. It found there was little significant difference in performance in distance between women in 2 (SP4), 3 (SP4, SP5) and 4 (SP5, SP6) in the discus. It found there was little significant difference in performance in time between men in 2 (SP4), 3 (SP4, SP5) and 4 (SP5, SP6) in the 100 meters. It found there was little significant difference in performance in distance between women in 2 (SP4), 3 (SP4, SP5), 4 (SP5, SP6), 5 (SP6, SP7) and 6 (SP7) in the discus. It found there was little significant difference in performance in time between men in 3 (SP4, SP5), 4 (SP5, SP6), 5 (SP6, SP7) and 6 (SP7) in the 200 meters. It found there was little significant difference in performance in distance between men in 3 (SP4, SP5) and 4 (SP5, SP6) in the javelin. It found there was little significant difference in performance in distance between men in 3 (SP4, SP5) and 4 (SP5, SP6) in the shot put.

=== Cycling ===
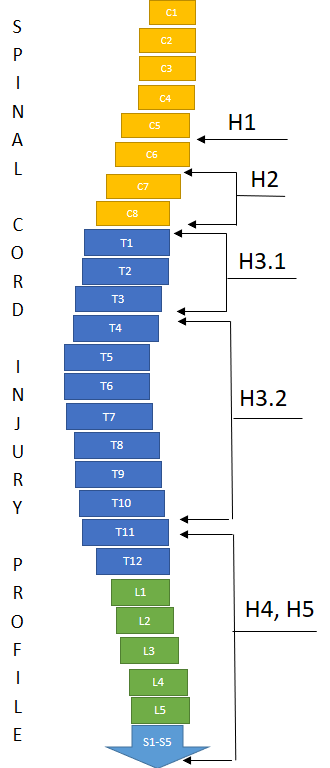
Cycling classification for spinal cord injuries for H1, H2, H3 and H4

Competitors from this class compete as H4 or H5. H4 is for paraplegics with impairments corresponding to a complete lesion from T11 or below. H5 is for paraplegics with impairments corresponding to a complete lesion from T11 or below.

Both H4 and H5 classifications can use ATP3 knee-seat cycle that is forward leaning on a rigid frame. Factoring is used in cycling to allow multiple classes and genders to compete against each other. UCI factoring for 2014 with H4 and H5 men as 100% on the factoring. Against this factoring, H5 women are 87.71%. When H3 men are set at 100%, H5 women are 90.19%. In track events, SP3 women are about 4 seconds faster than SP4 women per lap. SP3 and SP4 men are within 1 second of each other time wise per lap.

=== Swimming ===
Swimmers in this class compete in a number of IPC swimming classes. These include S3, SB3, S4 and S5. Swimming classification is done based on a total points system, with a variety of functional and medical tests being used as part of a formula to assign a class. Part of this test involves the Adapted Medical Research Council (MRC) scale. For upper trunk extension, T1 - T5 complete are given 1 - 2 points while T6 - T10 are given 3 - 5 points.

People in SB3 tend to be incomplete tetraplegics below C7, complete paraplegics around T1 - T5, or complete paraplegics at T1 - T8 with surgical rods put in their spinal column from T4 to T6. These rods impact their lumbar function and their balance. People in SB4 tend to be complete paraplegics below T6 to T10, complete paraplegics at T9 - L1 with surgical rods put in their spinal column from T4 to T6 which affects their balance, or incomplete tetraplegics below C8 with decent trunk function. S5 swimmers with spinal cord injuries tend to be complete paraplegics with lesions below T1 to T8, or incomplete tetraplegics below C8 who have decent trunk control. These swimmers have full use of their arms and are able to use their arms, hands and fingers to gain propulsion in the catch phase of swimming. Because they have minimal trunk control, their hips tend to be a bit lower in the water and they have leg drag. They either start in the water or start from a sitting dive position. They use their hands to make turns.

A study of was done comparing the performance of athletics competitors at the 1984 Summer Paralympics. It found there was little significant difference in performance times between women in 1A (SP1, SP2), 1B (SP3), and 1C (SP3, SP4) in the 25m breaststroke. It found there was little significant difference in performance times between women in 1A, and 1C in the 25m backstroke. It found there was little significant difference in performance times between women in 1A, 1B, and 1C in the 25m freestyle. It found there was little significant difference in performance times between men in 1A, 1B, and 1C in the 25m backstroke. It found there was little significant difference in performance times between men in 1A, 1B, and 1C in the 25m freestyle. It found there was little significant difference in performance times between women in 2 and 3 in the 50m breaststroke. It found there was little significant difference in performance times between men in 2 (SP4) and 3 (SP4, SP5) in the 50m breaststroke. It found there was little significant difference in performance times between women in 2 (SP4) and 3 (SP4, SP5) in the 50m freestyle. It found there was little significant difference in performance times between men in 2 and 3 in the 50m freestyle. It found there was little significant difference in performance times between men in 2 (SP4) and 3 (SP4, SP5) in the 50m backstroke. It found there was little significant difference in performance times between women in 2, 3 and 4 in the 25 m butterfly. It found there was little significant difference in performance times between men in 2, 3 and 4 in the 25 m butterfly.

=== Wheelchair basketball ===
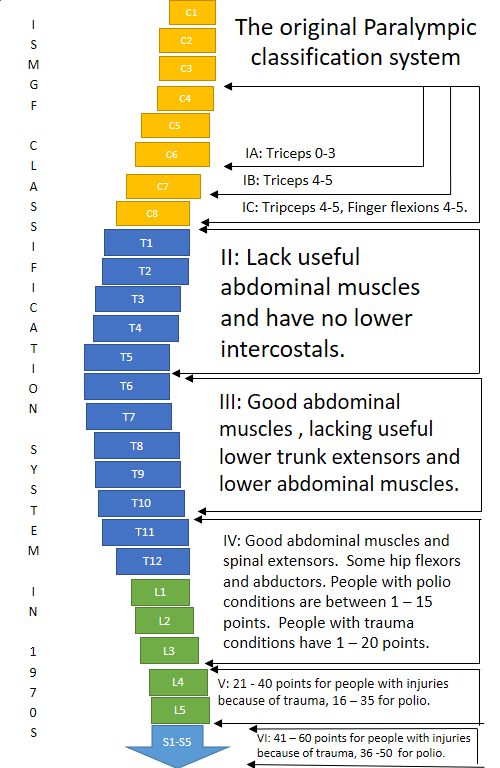
The original ISMGF classification system used at early Paralympic Games.

The original wheelchair basketball classification system in 1966 had 5 classes: A, B, C, D, S. Each class was worth so many points. A was worth 1, B and C were worth 2. D and S were worth 3 points. A team could have a maximum of 12 points on the floor. This system was the one in place for the 1968 Summer Paralympics. Class A was for T1-T9 complete. Class B was for T1-T9 incomplete. Class C was for T10-L2 complete. Class D was for T10-L2 incomplete. Class S was for Cauda equina paralysis. This class would have been part of Class A or Class B.

From 1969 to 1973, a classification system designed by Australian Dr. Bedwell was used. This system used some muscle testing to determine which class incomplete paraplegics should be classified in. It used a point system based on the ISMGF classification system. Class IA, IB and IC were worth 1 point. Class II for people with lesions between T1-T5 and no balance were also worth 1 point. Class III for people with lesions at T6-T10 and have fair balance were worth 1 point. Class IV was for people with lesions at T11-L3 and good trunk muscles. They were worth 2 points. Class V was for people with lesions at L4 to L5 with good leg muscles. Class IV was for people with lesions at S1-S4 with good leg muscles. Class V and IV were worth 3 points. The Daniels/Worthington muscle test was used to determine who was in class V and who was class IV. Paraplegics with 61 to 80 points on this scale were not eligible. A team could have a maximum of 11 points on the floor. The system was designed to keep out people with less severe spinal cord injuries, and had no medical basis in many cases. This class would have been IC, II or III.

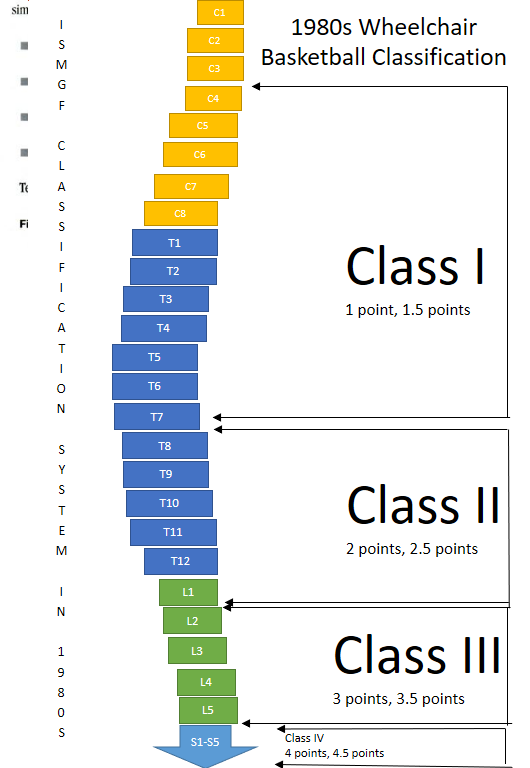
The wheelchair basketball classification system used during the 1980s was mostly functional, but had medical lesion based elements as a guideline. A maximum of 14 points was allowed on the floor at any time.

In 1982, wheelchair basketball finally made the move to a functional classification system internationally. While the traditional medical system of where a spinal cord injury was located could be part of classification, it was only one advisory component. This class would have been Class 1 at 1 or 1.5 points. Under the classification system currently in place, players from this class would likely be a 1 point player.

=== Wheelchair fencing ===
Wheelchair fencing is an option for F4 sportspeople. Generally, people in this class are classified as 2. People in this class generally are a paraplegic type D1 - D9, scoring less than 4 points on Type 1 and Type 2 function tests. They may have a minimal impairment in their dominant fencing hand, but otherwise have good sitting balance. For international IWF sanctioned competitions, this class is referred to as Category B. In some sports, such as wheelchair fencing, they may have good sitting balance and some impairment in their dominant hand.

=== Other sports ===
One of the sports open to people in this class is archery. People in this class compete in ARW2. This class is for people who have limited to good trunk function and normal functioning in their arms. It includes paraplegic archers, while ARW1 includes tetraplegic archers. People in this class participate can also participate in sit skiing. In the United States, domestic competitions have used different classification than the one used internationally. Two groups are used instead of LW10 to LW12. Group 1 is for people from T5 to T10. Group 2 is for people with lesions above T5.

Rowing is another sporting option for F4 sportspeople. Currently, people with a spinal cord injury at T12 level compete in AS. This class is for people who use their arms and shoulders to row. In 1991, the first internationally accepted adaptive rowing classification system was established and put into use. People from this class were initially classified as Q2, for people with lesions at C7-T1 or P1 for people with lesions at T2-T9.

Ten-pin bowling is another sport open to people in this class, where they compete in TPB8. People in this class do not have more than 70 points for functionality, have normal arm pitch for throwing and use a wheelchair.

== Getting classified ==
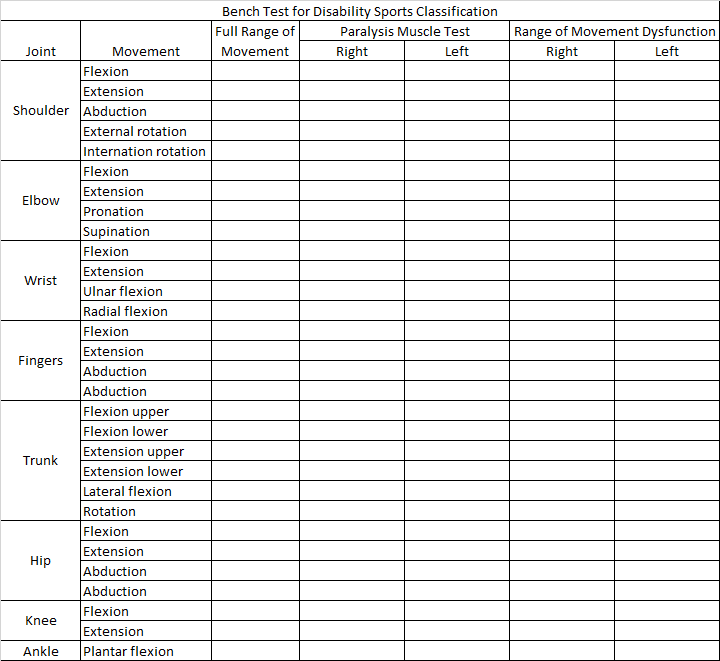
A standard bench press form used to for functional classification for wheelchair sportspeople.

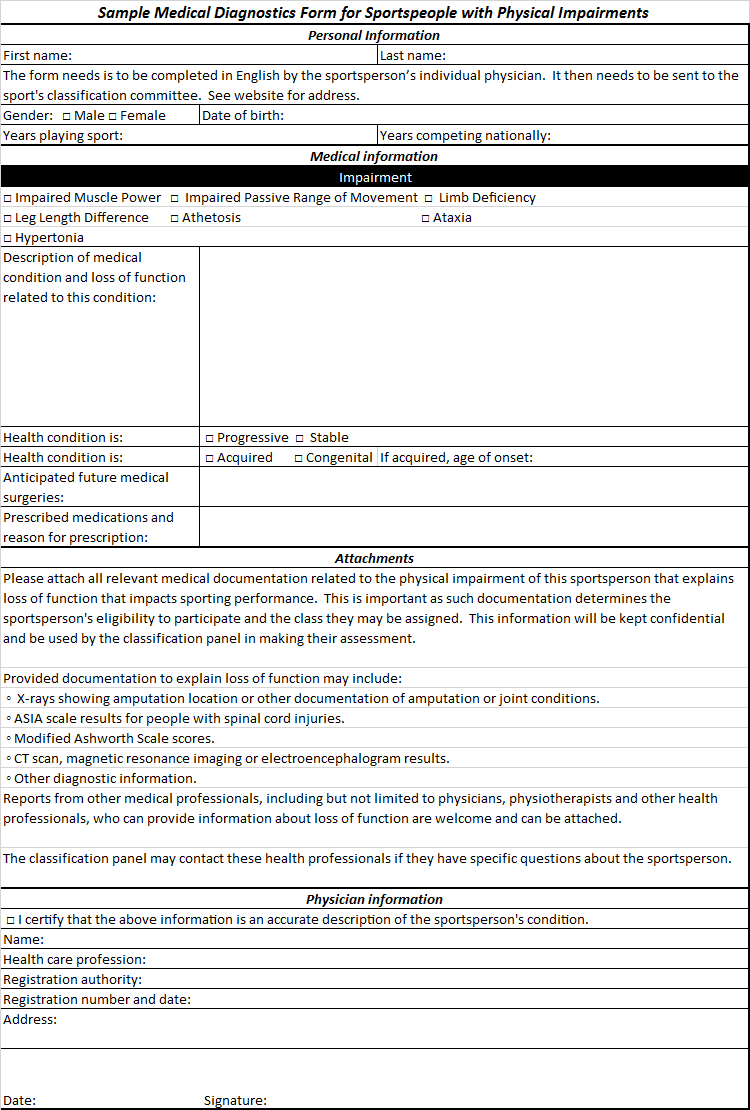
A sample medical classification form. Sportspeople would need some form of this sent to a classification panel.

Classification is often sport specific, and has two parts: a medical classification process and a functional classification process.

Medical classification for wheelchair sport can consist of medical records being sent to medical classifiers at the international sports federation. The sportsperson's physician may be asked to provide extensive medical information including medical diagnosis and any loss of function related to their condition. This includes if the condition is progressive or stable, if it is an acquired or congenital condition. It may include a request for information on any future anticipated medical care. It may also include a request for any medications the person is taking. Documentation required may include x-rays, ASIA scale results, or Modified Ashworth Scale scores.

One of the standard means of assessing functional classification is the bench test, which is used in swimming, lawn bowls and wheelchair fencing. Using the Adapted Research Council (MRC) measurements, muscle strength is tested using the bench press for a variety of spinal cord related injuries with a muscle being assessed on a scale of 0 to 5. A 0 is for no muscle contraction. A 1 is for a flicker or trace of contraction in a muscle. A 2 is for active movement in a muscle with gravity eliminated. A 3 is for movement against gravity. A 4 is for active movement against gravity with some resistance. A 5 is for normal muscle movement.

During functional and medical classification, a number of tests may be run for people in this class. For the trunk rotation test, people in this class are expected to have no abdominal function.

Wheelchair fencing classification has 6 test for functionality during classification, along with a bench test. Each test gives 0 to 3 points. A 0 is for no function. A 1 is for minimum movement. A 2 is for fair movement but weak execution. A 3 is for normal execution. The first test is an extension of the dorsal musculature. The second test is for lateral balance of the upper limbs. The third test measures trunk extension of the lumbar muscles. The fourth test measures lateral balance while holding a weapon. The fifth test measures the trunk movement in a position between that recorded in tests one and three, and tests two and four. The sixth test measures the trunk extension involving the lumbar and dorsal muscles while leaning forward at a 45 degree angle. In addition, a bench test is required to be performed.
