= Regulation D (SEC) =

SEC regulation

In the United States under the Securities Act of 1933, any offer to sell securities must either be registered with the United States Securities and Exchange Commission (SEC) or meet certain qualifications to exempt them from such registration. Regulation D (Reg D) contains the rules providing exemptions from the registration requirements, allowing some companies to offer and sell their securities without having to register the securities with the SEC. A Regulation D offering is intended to make access to the capital markets possible for small companies that could not otherwise bear the costs of a normal SEC registration. Reg D may also refer to an investment strategy, mostly associated with hedge funds, based upon the same regulation. The regulation is found under Title 17 of the Code of Federal Regulations, part 230, Sections 501 through 508. The legal citation is 17 C.F.R. §230.501 et seq.

On July 10, 2013, the SEC issued new final regulations allowing public advertising and solicitation of Regulation D offers to accredited investors.

== Overview ==
Reg D is composed of various rules prescribing the qualifications needed to meet exemptions from registration requirements for the issuance of securities. Rule 501 of Reg D contains definitions that apply to the rest of Reg D. Rule 502 contains the general conditions that must be met to take advantage of the exemptions under Regulation D. Generally speaking, these conditions are (1) that all sales within a certain time period that are part of the same Reg D offering must be "integrated", meaning they must be treated as one offering, (2) information and disclosures must be provided, (3) there must be no "general solicitation", and (4) that the securities being sold contain restrictions on their resale. Rule 503 requires issuers to file a Form D with the SEC when they make an offering under Regulation D. In Rules 504 and 505, Regulation D implements §3(b) of the Securities Act of 1933 (also referred to as the '33 Act), which allows the SEC to exempt issuances of under $5,000,000 from registration. It also provides (in Rule 506) a "safe harbor" under §4(a)(2) of the '33 Act (which says that non-public offerings are exempt from the registration requirement). In other words, if an issuer complies with the requirements of Rule 506, it can be assured that its offering is "non-public," and thus that it is exempt from registration. Rule 507 penalizes issuers who do not file the Form D, as required by Rule 503. Rule 508 provides the guidelines under which the SEC enforces Regulation D against issuers.

== Exemptions ==
Regulation D establishes three exemptions from Securities Act registration.

=== Rule 504 ===
Rule 504 provides an exemption for the offer and sale of up to $10,000,000 of securities in a 12-month period. The company may use this exemption so long as it is not a blank check company and is not subject to Exchange Act of 1934 reporting requirements. General offering and solicitations are permitted under Rule 504 as long as they are restricted to accredited investors. The issuer need not restrict purchaser's right to resell securities.

Rule 504 allows companies to sell securities that are not restricted if one of the following conditions is met:

- The offering is registered exclusively in one or more states that require a publicly filed registration statement and delivery of a substantive disclosure document to investors;
- The registration and sale takes place in a state that requires registration and disclosure delivery, and the buyer is in a state without those requirements, so long as the disclosure documents mandated by the state in which you registered to all purchasers are delivered; or
- The securities are sold exclusively according to state law exemptions that permit general solicitation and advertising and you are selling only to accredited investors. However, accredited investors are only needed when sold exclusively with state law exemptions on solicitation.

=== Rule 505 ===
On October 26, 2016, the Commission repealed Rule 505. It previously provided an exemption for offers and sales of securities totaling up to $5 million in any 12-month period. Under this exemption, securities could be sold to an unlimited number of "accredited investors" and up to 35 "unaccredited investors".

The Rule 505 exemption was phased out and its provisions integrated into the Rule 504 exemption. Rule 504's capital limit increased to $10 million and Rule 505's "Bad Actor" provision was added to Rule 504.

=== Rule 506 ===
A company that satisfies the following standards may qualify for an exemption under this rule:

- Can raise an unlimited amount of capital;
- Seller must be available to answer questions by prospective purchasers;
- Financial statement requirements as for Rule 505; and
- Purchasers receive restricted securities, which may not be freely traded in the secondary market after the offering.

The rule is split into two options based on whether the issuer will engage in general solicitation or advertising to market the securities.

If the issuer will not use general solicitation or advertising to market the securities then the sale of securities can be issued under Rule 506(b) to an unlimited number of accredited investors and up to 35 other purchasers. Unlike Rule 505, all non-accredited investors, either alone or with a purchaser representative, must be sophisticated – that is, they must have sufficient knowledge and experience in financial and business matters to make them capable of evaluating the merits and risks of the prospective investment.

In July 2013, the SEC issued new regulations as required by 2012 Jumpstart Our Business Startups Act. These new regulations add Rule 506(c) to allow general solicitation and advertising for a private placement offering. However, in a Rule 506(c) private offering all of the purchasers must be accredited investors and the issuer must take reasonable steps to determine that the purchaser is an accredited investor.

=== Accredited investor exemption ===
Section 4(a)(5) of the '33 Act exempts from registration offers and sales of securities to accredited investors when the total offering price is less than $5 million and no public solicitation or advertising is made. However, Regulation D does not address the offering of securities under this section of the '33 Act. This definition is also used in defining the size of investment allowed under Regulation A.

== Other countries ==
In Canada, comparables to Reg D securities are termed exempt market securities and fall under National Instrument 45–106.
