= Form 5 =

Insider trading form in the US

Form 5 is an SEC filing submitted to the Securities and Exchange Commission on an annual basis by company officers, directors, or beneficial (10%) owners, which summarizes their insider trading activities. This form is simply a combination of year's Form 4 filings, which are mandatory filings made shortly after insiders make transactions.

Form 5 is stored in SEC's EDGAR database and academic researchers make these reports freely available as structured datasets in the Harvard Dataverse.
