= Military parlance =

Military parlance is the vernacular used within the military and embraces all aspects of service life; it can be described as both a "code" and a "classification" of something. Like many close and closed communities, the language used can often be full of jargon and not readily intelligible to outsiders—sometimes this is for military operational or security reasons; other times it is because of the natural evolution of the day-to-day language used in the various units.

For example: "Captain, this situation is 'Scale A'", "Scale A" being an army's parlance for "This situation requires the closest of attention and resources and all members of relevance should be present."

The military has developed its own slang, partly as means of self-identification. This slang is also used to reinforce the (usually friendly) interservice rivalries. Some terms are derogatory to varying degrees and many service personnel take some pleasure in the sense of shared hardships which they endure and which is reflected in the slang terms.

== Military abbreviations ==
The military often use initials and abbreviations of all kinds – partly for security and operational reasons and partly for the simple convenience of their use; like all such things they can be hard to understand for outsiders. A few examples are given below:

=== US Army ===
- G.I. – originally stood for "Galvanized Iron" but has come to be interpreted as everything from "General Infantry" (soldiers) to "Government Issue" and "Government Inductee".
- SHAEF – Supreme Headquarters Allied Expeditionary Force (WWII)
- AO – area of operations

=== Indian Army ===
- GD – general duty – usually indicates the equivalent of G.I. in the US Army.
- CO – commanding officer (of a major unit).
- LC – line of control (usually referred to as LoC in non-military parlance).

=== British Army ===
- HQ – Headquarters
- CGS – Chief of the General Staff (formerly Chief of the Imperial General Staff (CIGS) – as in Lord Alanbrooke)
- GCHQ – UK Government Communications Headquarters (Cheltenham)
- ADC – aide de camp (a military or naval officer who helps an officer of higher rank)
- OC – Officer Commanding
- GOC – General Officer Commanding (usually followed by number indicating what rank of General is being mentioned)
- SIS – Secret Intelligence Service
- MI8 – British signals intelligence group in World War II. Also known as the Radio Security Service, it tracked radio broadcasts about German bombers during The Blitz.
- MI9 – Escape & Evasion services (WWII)
- VC – Victoria Cross
- MM – Military Medal
- MC – Military Cross
- RV – Rendezvous Point
- FRV – Final Rendezvous Point

== Tactics ==
The "Four Fs" is a military term used in the United States military, especially during World War II.

Designed to be easy to remember, the "Four Fs" are as follows:

- Find – Locate the enemy
- Fix – Pin them down with suppressing fire
- Flank – Send soldiers to the enemy's sides or rear
- Finish – Eliminate all enemy combatants

The British Army uses the mnemonic "Perry Rat Likes Shooting Arseholes Regularly" as a way of remembering its Six Section Battle Drills (Squad Tactics):

- P – Prepare for battle
- R – Reaction to effective enemy fire (RTR (Return fire, Take cover, Return appropriate fire))
- L – Locate the enemy
- S – Suppress the enemy
- A – Assault the enemy position
- R – Reorganise

Alternatively, the British Army uses the mnemonic P.R.E.W.A.R. to remember the 6 section battle drills. These are:

- P – Preparation/Prep for battle
- R – Reaction to effective enemy fire
- E – Enemy Location
- W – Winning the Fire Fight
- A – Assaulting the enemy Position
- R – Reorganisation

The seven Ps:

- Prior Planning and Preparation Prevents Piss Poor Performance.

== Military songs and bands ==
Many armed forces, particularly the US Army, use songs as part of the training process, to help build morale and allow troops to train to a unified rhythm. Historically armies also went into battle led by a military band and such bands are still maintained in the armed forces today – albeit for mainly ceremonial purposes.

Apart from the official side of music, fighting troops have always sung to keep up their morale and to ridicule the enemy, examples from the two world wars include:

- "Hitler has only got one ball" (Colonel Bogey)
- "It's a long way to Tipperary"
- "Pack Up Your Troubles in Your Old Kit-Bag"
- "Gee, Mom, I Want to Go Home"
- "Mademoiselle from Armentières"

== Ranks ==
=== Purpose ===
Military ranks are necessary to identify the role of each serving individual and to show the hierarchy of command; however they can be obscure to non-military personnel and even comparing comparative ranks between different services is not always straightforward; the following pages detail these matters in more detail:

- Army ranks
- Navy ranks
- Air force ranks
- Comparative ranks

=== Insignia ===
Rank insignia is worn on military uniforms to identify the rank of the wearer and can involve such diverse elements as different uniforms, shoulder flashes, armbands and cap insignia. For more information, see the following pages:

- British Army officer rank insignia and British Army other ranks rank insignia
- Royal Navy officer rank insignia
- RAF officer ranks and RAF other ranks
- U.S. Navy enlisted rate insignia and U.S. Navy officer rank insignia
- United States Air Force enlisted rank insignia and United States Air Force officer rank insignia
- United States Marine Corps rank insignia

== British Army jargon/slang ==
The British Army has a rich and diverse history of slang usage; the following links provide more detail on the subject:

- List of British army slang
- WWII related military slang

== Medals ==
Medals are issued to military personnel to commemorate an event, campaign or as a sign of distinction. The history of medals is a subject in itself and more information can be found on the following pages:

See the following pages:

- British and Commonwealth orders and decorations
- Awards and decorations of the United States military

== Code names ==
Code names such as Operation Market Garden and Operation Overlord are given by the military to plans being developed and then executed. They serve to disguise the nature of the operation should an enemy or unauthorised person come across the name (although the military of the United States have recently used codenames to trumpet the operation's intention, such as Operation Iraqi Freedom).
