= Form F-4 =

U.S. SEC filing used to register securities involving foreign entities

Form F-4 is an American form used to register securities in connection with business combinations and exchange offers involving foreign private issuers. These activities include mergers and acquisitions, going-private transactions, rights offerings, and other similar deals conducted by foreign entities.

== Resources ==
- SEC Homepage
