= Electronic Data Gathering, Analysis, and Retrieval =

Securities and Exchange Commission database

EDGAR (Electronic Data Gathering, Analysis, and Retrieval) is an internal database system operated by the U.S. Securities and Exchange Commission (SEC) that performs automated collection, validation, indexing, and accepted forwarding of submissions by companies and others who are required by law to file forms with the SEC. The database contains a wealth of information about the commission and the securities industry which is freely available to the public via the Internet.

In September 2017, SEC chairman Jay Clayton revealed the database had been hacked and that companies' data may have been used by criminals for insider trading.

== History ==
Development on EDGAR began in 1993, with all public company filings required to be submitted through EDGAR (instead of paper filings) by May 6, 1996, following a three-year phase-in. On November 4, 2002, the SEC began requiring foreign companies and foreign governments to submit filings via EDGAR as well. Prior to that time, electronic filing by foreign companies also was voluntary. In 2024, the SEC rolled out a new platform, EDGAR Next, that requires individuals to authenticate their identities through Login.gov prior to submitting filings.

== Filings ==
Not all SEC filings by public companies are available on EDGAR. As of that date, all public domestic companies were required to submit their filings via EDGAR, except for hardcopy paper filings, which were allowed under a hardship exemption. Third-party filings with respect to these companies, such as tender offers and Schedule 13D filings, are also filed via EDGAR.

The vast majority of documents are now filed electronically, with over 3,000 filings per day.

Actual annual reports to shareholders (except in the case of mutual fund companies) need not be submitted on EDGAR, although some companies do so voluntarily. However, the annual report on Form 10-K is required to be filed on EDGAR. As of May 25, 2025, there were over 17 million filings to EDGAR.

== See also ==
- Central Index Key
- Electronic Municipal Market Access system (EMMA), providing disclosure information for the municipal securities market
- Form N-1A
- List of company registers

=== Other countries' equivalents to EDGAR ===
- Federal Public Service Economy (Belgium)
- SEDAR, Canada
- Central Business Register (Denmark)
- Companies Registration Office (Ireland)
- Kamer van Koophandel, Netherlands
- Brønnøysund Register Centre, Norway
- Comisión Nacional del Mercado de Valores, Spain
- Companies House, United Kingdom
- Securities and Exchange Board of India, India
- FinancialReports, Europe
