= Qualified institutional placement =

Capital-raising tool

Qualified institutional placement (QIP) is a capital-raising tool, primarily used in India and other parts of southern Asia, whereby a listed company can issue equity shares, fully and partly convertible debentures, or any securities other than warrants which are convertible to equity shares to a qualified institutional buyer (QIB).

Apart from preferential allotment, this is the only other speedy method of private placement whereby a listed company can issue shares or convertible securities to a select group of persons. QIP scores over other methods because the issuing firm does not have to undergo elaborate procedural requirements to raise this capital.

== Why was it introduced? ==
The Securities and Exchange Board of India (SEBI) introduced the QIP process through a circular issued on May 8, 2006, to prevent listed companies in India from developing an excessive dependence on foreign capital. Prior to the innovation of the qualified institutional placement, there was concern from Indian market regulators and authorities that Indian companies were accessing international funding via issuing securities, such as American depository receipts (ADRs), in outside markets. The complications associated with raising capital in the domestic markets had led many companies to look at tapping the overseas markets. This was seen as an undesirable export of the domestic equity market, so the QIP guidelines were introduced to encourage Indian companies to raise funds domestically instead of tapping overseas markets.

== Who can participate in the issue? ==
The specified securities can be issued only to QIBs, who shall not be promoters or related to promoters of the issuer. The issue is managed by a Sebi-registered merchant banker. There is no pre-issue filing of the placement document with Sebi. The placement document is placed on the websites of the stock exchanges and the issuer, with appropriate disclaimer to the effect that the placement is meant only QIBs on private placement basis and is not an offer to the public.

(QIBs) are those institutional investors who are generally perceived to possess expertise and the financial muscle to evaluate and invest in the capital markets. In terms of clause 2.2.2B (v) of DIP guidelines, a ‘qualified institutional buyer’ shall mean:

g) foreign venture capital investors registered with SEBI. h) state industrial development corporations. i) insurance companies registered with the Insurance Regulatory and Development Authority (IRDA). j) provident funds with minimum corpus of Rs.25 crores k) pension funds with minimum corpus of Rs. 25 crores "These entities are not required to be registered with SEBI as QIBs. Any entities falling under the categories specified above are considered as QIBs for the purpose of participating in primary issuance process."

== QIPs in India and the US ==
In US US securities laws contain a number of exemptions from the requirement of registering securities with the US Securities & Exchange Commission (SEC). Pursuant to Rule 144A of the Securities Act of 1933, issuers may target private placements of securities to QIBs. Although often referred to as Rule 144A offerings, as a technical matter, transactions must actually involve an initial sale from the issuer to the underwriter and then a resale from the underwriters to the QIBs. A QIB is defined under Rule 144A as having investment discretion of at least $100 million and includes institutions such as insurance agencies, investment companies, banks, etc. Rule 144A was adopted by the SEC in 1990 in order to make the US private placement market more attractive to foreign issuers who may not wish to make more onerous direct US listings. Whereas the US regulators by enacting Rule 144A sought to make the domestic US capital markets more attractive to foreign issuers, the Indian regulators are seeking to make the domestic Indian capital markets more attractive to domestic Indian issuers.

In India Therefore, to encourage domestic securities placements (instead of foreign currency convertible bonds (FCCBs) and global or American depository receipts (GDRs or ADRs)), the Securities and Exchange Board of India (SEBI) has with effect from May 8, 2006 inserted Chapter XIIIA into the SEBI (Disclosure & Investor Protection) Guidelines, 2000 (the DIP Guidelines), to provide guidelines for Qualified Institutional Placements (the QIP Scheme). The QIP Scheme is open to investments made by “Qualified Institutional Buyers” (which includes public financial institutions, mutual funds, foreign institutional investors, venture capital funds and foreign venture capital funds registered with the SEBI) in any issue of equity shares/ fully convertible debentures/ partly convertible debentures or any securities other than warrants, which are convertible into or exchangeable with equity shares at a later date (Securities). Pursuant to the QIP Scheme, the Securities may be issued by the issuer at a price that shall be no lower than the higher of the average of the weekly high and low of the closing prices of the related shares quoted on the stock exchange (i) during the preceding six months; or (ii) the preceding two weeks. The issuing company may issue the Securities only on the basis of a placement document and a merchant banker needs to be appointed for such purpose. There are certain obligations which are to be undertaken by the merchant banker. The minimum number of QIP allottees shall not be less than two when the aggregate issue size is less than or equal to Rs 250 crore; and not less than five, where the issue size is greater than Rs 250 crore. However, no single allottee shall be allotted more than 50 per cent of the aggregate issue size. The aggregate of proposed placement under the QIP Scheme and all previous placements made in the same financial year by the company shall not exceed five times the net worth of the issuer as per the audited balance sheet of the previous financial year. The Securities allotted pursuant to the QIP Scheme shall not be sold by the allottees for a period of one year from the date of allotment, except on a recognized stock exchange. This provision allows the allottees an exit mechanism on the stock exchange without having to wait for a minimum period of one year, which would have been the lock–in period had they subscribed to such shares pursuant to a preferential allotment.

== The Difference ==
There are some key differences between the SEC’s Rule 144A and the SEBI QIP Scheme such as the SEBI pricing guidelines and the US rule that a private placement under Rule 144 A must be a resale and not a direct issue by the issuer. In addition, the target audience of both regulations is different -while the impetus behind Rule 144A was to encourage non-US issuers to undertake US private placements, the impetus behind the SEBI QIP Scheme was to encourage domestic Indian issuers to undertake domestic Indian private placements. Nonetheless, the intention of both regulations is to encourage private placements in the domestic markets of the US and India, respectively

== Benefits of qualified institutional placements ==
Time saving:

QIPs can be raised within short span of time rather than in FPO, Right Issue takes long process.

Rules and regulations:

In a QIP there are fewer formalities with regard to rules and regulation, as compared to follow-on public issue (FPO) and rights Issue.

A QIP would mean that a company would only have to pay incremental fees to the exchange. Additionally in the case of a GDR, you would have to convert your accounts to IFRS (International Financial Reporting Standards). For a QIP, company’s audited results are more than enough

Cost-efficient:

The cost differential vis-à-vis an ADR/GDR or FCCB in terms of legal fees, is huge. Then there is the entire process of listing overseas, the fees involved. It is easier to be listed on the BSE/NSE vis-à-vis seeking a say Luxembourg or a Singapore listing.

Lock-in:

It provides an opportunity to buy non-locking shares and as such is an easy mechanism if corporate governance and other required parameters are in place.
