= Covered security =

In U.S. law, a covered security may refer to two categories of securities:

- Under The National Securities Markets Improvement Act of 1996, as codified in Section 18 of the Securities Act of 1933, a "covered security" enjoys certain preemption rights as described below, and includes more than one category of security. A large category of "covered security" includes any security listed (or authorized for listing) on an SEC-registered exchange, which as of March 16, 2023, included among others the NYSE, AMEX, Midwest (Chicago), and NASDAQ Global Market (for complete list see https://www.sec.gov/rules/sro.shtml), or any security with the same issuer that is senior to the listed security (for example, bonds and preferred stock) or equal in seniority to the listed security (for example, certain rights and warrants). Another common category of "covered security" includes shares issued in certain private placements including most notably those conducted pursuant to SEC Rule 506 of Regulation D, although such securities are only "covered" in connection with that particular transaction. Offers and sales of covered securities are exempt from certain registration (also known as "qualification" in many states) and filing requirements of state securities laws (many but not all of which are based upon the Uniform Securities Act), but are not exempt from any anti-fraud provisions. The states are also allowed to require certain notice filings and the payment of certain fees in connection with private placements involving covered securities.
- In U.S. Federal income tax law, a covered security is one for the sale of which the broker must report, to the Internal Revenue Service, the customer's basis and information on whether the sale results in a short-term or long-term gain or loss. This rule applies to certain types of securities, acquired after a specified effective date. The law phases in between January 1, 2011, and January 1, 2013 (or later).

The latter category was created in an amendment to section 6045 of the Internal Revenue Code in Section 403 of the Energy Improvement and Extension Act of 2008 (Public Law 110-343, division B). The law refers to any security in this category as "specified security", and defines such securities to include stock in a corporation, notes, bonds, debentures and other evidence of indebtedness, commodities, commodity contracts or derivatives, and any other financial instrument for which the Secretary of the Treasury or his delegate determines that the reporting of adjusted basis is appropriate. Information is reportable if the security is acquired after a certain effective date (with some exceptions, January 1, 2011).

== See also ==
- Uniform Securities Act
- The National Securities Markets Improvement Act of 1996
- Uniform Securities Agent State Law Exam (Series 63)

== Sources ==
- National Securities Markets Improvement Act of 1996 (Enrolled as Agreed to or Passed by Both House and Senate); Section 18(b) Archived 2008-11-12 at the Wayback Machine
