= Diversified Global Graphics Group =

Diversified Global Graphics Group — DG3
- Type: Incorporated
- Industry: Financial printing, commercial printing
- Founded: 1983
- Headquarters: Jersey City, New Jersey, United States
- Key people: Thomas Saggiomo, President and CEO
- Products: Catalogs, direct mail, fulfillment, prospectuses and other financial documents, retail inserts, variable data printing, web-to-print and electronic SEC filings
- Revenue: $150M
- Number of employees: 700
- Website: http://www.dg3.com

Diversified Global Graphics Group — (DG3) is a printing firm located in Jersey City, New Jersey. The company also has offices in London, Hong Kong, Manila, Tokyo, and Sydney.

DG3 was ranked 36 in the 2008 and 2009 Printing Impressions 400, published by the North American Publishing Company (NAPCO). The list consists of leading printing companies in the US and Canada.

== History ==
=== 1983–1989 ===
DG3 traces its roots back to 1983, when Michael Cunningham formed Cunningham Graphics International Inc. (CGI) in the United States. CGI served the financial service industry as a print broker. In 1989, CGI established itself in the New York City area as a print manufacturer, specializing in printing time-sensitive investment research for the financial service industry.

=== 1990–1999 ===
In 1990, CGI shifted its focus to the globalization of financial markets. As a result, CGI formed a strategic alliance with both Roda Print in London and Workable in Hong Kong. Roda Print was known for developing and producing fast-turnaround printing services for the investment banking community in London. Workable was known as the printer of choice for Hong Kong's finance industry. The alliance between the three companies formed the World Research Link (WRL). WRL specialized in simultaneous printing and distribution across multiple time zone for CGI's global clients.

Throughout the 1990s, CGI focused on acquiring the in-house print facilities of major financial institutions. In all, CGI acquired ten in-house production operations from the twenty top financial institutions in the world, while providing non-exclusive services to an additional three.

In 1998, CGI completed its initial public offering on Nasdaq (NM: CGII) and acquired Roda Print and Workable Printing Limited in Hong Kong. In addition, CGI acquired several other printing firms and completed additional outsourcing transactions in the United States. In the first year of public offering, CGI saw a gain of 71% over the previous year's earnings.

=== 2000–2006 ===
In June 2000, CGI was acquired by the world's largest payroll processing and financial services back office processing firm — Automatic Data Processing Inc. (NYSE: ADP). The business changed its name to ADP Graphic Communications and operated as part of ADP's Investor Communications Division. In 2004, Peter Furlonge acquired CGI Europe Limited, CGI Asia Limited, CGI Japan Limited and CGI Pacific Limited from ADP in a management buyout to form The CGI Group. Furlonge then completed the acquisition of a large digital print business called 3D Digital Ltd. and formed CGI Squared, a technology-focused creative communications business in Birmingham, England of which John White was Managing Director.

In 2006, Peter Furlonge acquired the US graphic communications businesses from ADP, reforming the CGI business to look like the company before its acquisition by ADP.

David Klaiss was promoted to President of the North American business and played a leading role in stabilizing the company and returning it to profit.

=== 2007–present ===
In 2007, CGI changed its name to Diversified Global Graphics Group — DG3, and award-winning entrepreneur Michael Cunningham returned as Group Chief Executive Officer.

In 2008, DG3 received a substantial investment from Arsenal Capital Partners and appointed Larry Bloch as Chairman. In that same year, DG3 acquired PharmAid Industries, a supplier of communications services to pharmaceutical firms and Pace Press, a New York area commercial print provider. In addition, DG3 formalities Computershare Communication Services, a Computershare Limited (ASX: CPU) business, to deliver an improved shareholder communication model to public companies worldwide. DG3 also opened a facility devoted to rapid-response worldwide fulfillment.

At this time DG3 divested its UK marketing, corporate communications and typesetting business, DG3 Squared, to the group's VP for Emerging Products and Services, John White, who led an MBO to form MADISONSOHO

In 2010, focused on innovation, DG3 launched its FundINSite product to help investment companies comply with new disclosure requirements. Also in 2010, DG3 released its XBRL viewer software. The proprietary software was designed to allow investment companies to increase usability within SEC compliance regulations.

In November 2010, DG3 announced the acquisition of UK-based 1StopXBRL Limited (1Stop). 1 Stop is a supplier of iXBRL and XBRL services in the US, UK, and other International Jurisdictions.

== Environmental leadership ==
DG3 has taken an active stance on environmental responsibility. The EPA has recognized DG3 to be one of the top 5 commercial printing companies according to a national survey of environmental leadership. DG3 is also a member of the EPA Green Power Partnership.

DG3 has been recognized by the New Jersey Department of Transportation as a Platinum Level Smart Workplace from 2007 to 2010. The recognition is presented to companies that provide commuter benefit programs to employees in order to promote improved air quality and decreased traffic congestion.

DG3 Europe has also set an initiative to increase sustainability within their UK facilities. Their work earned DG3 Europe the Best Business Services Company award from Green Business Awards in 2008.

== Awards and recognition ==
- New Jersey Department of Transportation Smart Workplaces Award, 2007 (as CGI Group America, Inc), 2008, 2009, 2010.
- Best Business Services Company — Green Business Awards 2008 (Presented to DG3 Europe).
- Certificate of Merit: Digital Printing — On Demand — Printing Industries of America. Premiere Print Awards, 2009.
- Gold Awards — International Association of Printing House Craftsmen (IAPHC). 35th annual Gallery of Superb Printing competition, 2009.
- Multiple Gold Ink Awards. 22nd annual printing competition, 2009.
  - Categories: superior color quality, technical difficulty, overall visual effect
- IAPHC International Gallery of Excellence printing competition 2010. Multiple.
  - Categories: three gold awards, one silver award and one bronze award
