= Robert J. Sanborn =

American fund manager

Robert J. Sanborn (born 1958 in Boston) is a fund manager, Portfolio manager and managing member of Sanborn Kilcollin Partners, LLC an investment management firm started in 2001. The firm is based in Chicago and manages an equity fund along with separately managed accounts. Mr. Sanborn manages the investments with portfolio manager Joshua Mangoubi. Mr. Sanborn was the portfolio manager of The Oakmark Fund, the flagship mutual fund of Harris Associates L.P., from Oakmark’s launch in August 1991 through March 2000. From 1983 to 1988 he was a security analyst and equity portfolio manager for the Ohio State Teachers Retirement System.

He holds a BA from Dartmouth College 1980 and an MBA from the University of Chicago 1983.
