= Investment company =

Financial institution

An investment company is a financial services company that specializes in holding, managing and investing securities. These companies in the United States are regulated by the U.S. Securities and Exchange Commission and must be registered under the Investment Company Act of 1940. Investment companies invest money on behalf of their clients who, in return, share in the profits and losses.

Investment companies are designed for long-term investment, not short-term trading.

Investment companies do not include brokerage companies, insurance companies, or banks.

In United States securities regulation, there are at least five types of investment companies:

- Open-End Management Investment Companies (mutual funds)
- Face-amount certificate companies: very rare
- Closed-End Management Investment Companies (closed-end funds)
- UITs (unit investment trusts): only issue redeemable units
- Exchange-traded funds (ETFs)

In general, each of these investment companies must register under the Securities Act of 1933 and the Investment Company Act of 1940. A fourth and lesser-known type of investment company under the Investment Company Act of 1940 is a Face-Amount Certificate Company.

Investment companies should not be confused with investment platforms such as eToro, Robinhood, Fidelity and E-Trade, which are digital services or tools that enable investors to access and manage various financial instruments such as stocks, bonds, mutual funds, exchange-traded funds (ETFs), options, futures, cryptocurrencies, and real estate.

A major type of company not covered under the Investment Company Act 1940 is private investment companies, which are simply private companies that make investments in stocks or bonds, but are limited to under 250 investors and are not regulated by the SEC. These funds are often composed of very wealthy investors.

Investment companies that choose to register under the Investment Company Act of 1940, or any investment fund that is subject to similar regulation in another jurisdiction are considered regulated funds. This provides certain protections and oversight for investors. Regulated funds normally have restrictions on the types and amounts of investments the fund manager can make. Typically, regulated funds may only invest in listed securities and no more than 5% of the fund may be invested in a single security. The majority of investment companies are mutual funds, both in terms of number of funds and assets under management.

== Regulated funds ==
The International Investment Funds Association defines regulated funds as open-end collective investment vehicles that are subject to substantive regulation. Open-end funds allow investors to purchase new shares or redeem existing shares on demand.

In the United States, regulated funds include not only open-end mutual funds and exchange-traded funds, but also unit investment trusts and closed-end funds.

In Europe, regulated funds encompass UCITS (Undertakings for Collective Investment in Transferable Securities) like ETFs and money market funds, as well as alternative investment funds known as AIFs.

In many countries, regulated funds may also include institutional funds limited to non-retail investors, funds offering principal guarantees, and open-end real estate funds investing directly in property assets.

=== Regulated investment companies ===
In US federal tax law, regulated investment companies (RICs) are a classification of investment company which, in return for satisfying certain legal requirements, are treated as pass-through entities for tax purposes, thus allowing their investors to avoid double taxation. To qualify, among other requirements, at least 90% of a company's income must come from investments, and at least 90% of the company's net investment income must be distributed to its shareholders. Additionally, a RIC must pass both a 5/10/50% test and a 25% test for diversification.

The 25% test requires that, at most, 25% of a RIC's assets can be invested in:

- Any single non-government, non-RIC issuer
- Securities of multiple non-RIC issuers which the RIC "controls" (through at least 20% voting power) and which are engaged in similar or related businesses
- Qualified publicly-traded partnerships

The 5/10/50% test requires that the total of all of the following must be less than 50% of a RIC's assets:

- Investments of more than 5% of the RIC's assets in a single issuer
- Investments in a single issuer which constitute more than 10% of that issuer's voting shares

== History ==
The first investment trusts were established in Europe in the late 1700s by a Dutch trader who wanted to enable small investors to pool their funds and diversify. This is where the idea of investment companies originated, as stated by K. Geert Rouwenhorst. In the 1800s in England, "investment pooling" emerged with trusts that resembled modern investment funds in structure. For example, the Foreign and Colonial Government Trust formed in London in 1868 provided small investors the advantages of diversification previously only available to the wealthy.

The Scottish American Investment Trust, founded in 1873, was one of the first funds to invest in American securities and help finance the post-Civil War U.S. economy. This established a link between British fund models and U.S. markets. The first mutual fund, or open-end fund, was introduced in Boston in 1924 by the Massachusetts Investors Trust. This fund introduced innovations like continuous share offerings, share redemptions, and clear investment policies.

The 1929 stock market crash and Great Depression temporarily hampered investment funds. But new securities regulations in the 1930s like the 1933 Securities Act restored investor confidence. A number of innovations then led to steady growth in investment company assets and accounts over the decades.

== Securities legislation ==
=== The Investment Company Act of 1940 ===
The Investment Company Act of 1940 regulates the structure and operations of investment companies. It requires registration and disclosure for companies with over 100 investors. The act governs investment company capital, custody of assets, transactions with affiliates, and fund board duties.

=== The Investment Advisers Act of 1940 ===
The Investment Advisers Act of 1940 regulates investment advisers to registered funds and other large advisers. It establishes registration, record keeping, reporting and other requirements for advisers.

=== The Securities Exchange Act of 1934 ===
The Securities Exchange Act of 1934 regulates trading, buying and selling of securities including investment company shares. It governs broker-dealers who sell fund shares. In 1938, it authorized the creation of self-regulatory organizations like FINRA to oversee broker-dealers.

=== The Securities Act of 1933 ===
The Securities Act of 1933 requires public securities offerings, including of investment company shares, to be registered. It also mandates that investors receive a current prospectus describing the fund.

== See also ==
- Asset management firm
- Holding company
- Investment trust
- Private equity firm
