= SEC v. Ralston Purina Co. =

Securities and Exchange Commission v. Ralston Purina Co.
- Supreme Court of the United States

Argued April 28, 1953 Decided June 8, 1953
- Full case name: Securities and Exchange Commission v. Ralston Purina Co.
- Citations: 346 U.S. 119 (more) 73 S. Ct. 981; 97 L. Ed. 1494; 1953 U.S. LEXIS 2688

Case history
- Prior: On a complaint brought by the Securities and Exchange Commission under § 20 (b) of the Securities Act of 1933, seeking to enjoin respondent's unregistered offerings of its stock to its employees, the District Court held the exemption of § 4 (1) applicable and dismissed the suit. 102 F. Supp. 964. The Court of Appeals affirmed. 200 F.2d 85. The Supreme Court granted certiorari. 345 US. 903.

Holding
- SEC

Court membership
- Chief Justice Fred M. Vinson Associate Justices Hugo Black · Stanley F. Reed; Felix Frankfurter · William O. Douglas; Robert H. Jackson · Harold H. Burton; Tom C. Clark · Sherman Minton

Case opinion
- Majority: Clark, joined by Vinson, Black, Reed, Frankfurter, Douglas, Minton
- Jackson took no part in the consideration or decision of the case.

Laws applied
- Securities Act of 1933, § 4(1)

Securities and Exchange Commission v. Ralston Purina Co., 346 U.S. 119 (1953), was a case in which the United States Supreme Court held that a corporation offering "key employees" equity stock shares is eligible for a transaction-based exemption from securities registration under Section 4(1) [Now Section 4(a)(2)] of the Securities Act of 1933. This exemption would generally not apply when offered to all employees, including rank-and-file employees, as the investors should be "sophisticated investors."

== Rule ==
Section 4(1) [Now Section 4(a)(2)] of the Securities Act of 1933 exempts "transactions by an issuer not involving any public offering" from the registration requirements of Section 5. This is also known as the "private offering exemption."

== Facts of the case ==
Ralston Purina provided feed and cereal products throughout the U.S. and Canada. The company was staffed by some 7,000 employees with which Ralston had a policy of encouraging stock ownership. Between 1947 and 1951, Ralston Purina sold nearly $2 million of stock to employees without registration. In each of these years, Ralston Purina authorized the sale of common stock "to employees ... who shall, without solicitation by the Company ... inquire of any of them as to how to purchase common stock of Ralston Purina Company." A memorandum sent to branch and store managers advised that the "only employees to whom this stock will be available will be those who take the initiative and are interested in buying stock at present market prices."

Among those who responded to these offers were employees with the duties of artist, bakeshop foreman, chow loading foreman, clerical assistant, copywriter, electrician, and veterinarian. The buyers lived across the U.S. The lowest salary bracket of those purchasing was $2,700 in 1949, $2,435 in 1950 and $3,107 in 1951. The record shows that in 1947, 243 employees bought stock, 20 in 1948, 414 in 1949, 411 in 1950, and the 1951 offer, interrupted by this litigation, produced 165 applications to purchase. No records were kept of those to whom the offers were made; the estimated number in 1951 was 500.

== Procedural history ==
Ralston Purina conceded that an offering to all of its employees would be a public offering which would require it to have filed a registration statement under Section 5 the Securities Act of 1933. The company claimed that it was exempted from filing because it offered stock only to key employees' in its organization. Ralston Purina argued on trial that ‘A key employee ... would include an individual who is eligible for promotion, an individual who especially influences others or who advises others, a person whom the employees look to in some special way, an individual, of course, who carries some special responsibility, who is sympathetic to management and who is ambitious and who the management feels is likely to be promoted to a greater responsibility.’

== Issue ==
Whether offering stock to 'key employees' would exempt Ralston Purina from filing a registration statement under Section 4(1) [Now Section 4(a)(2)] of the Securities Act of 1933.

== Analysis by the court ==
"The natural way to interpret the private offering exemption is in light of the statutory purpose. Since exempt transactions are those as to which ‘there is no practical need for * * * (the bill's) application,’ the applicability of [Section 4(a)(2)] should turn on whether the particular class of persons affected need the protection of the Act. An offering to those who are shown to be able to fend for themselves is a transaction ‘not involving any public offering.' " Ralston Purina, 346 US 119, 125 (1953).

The "exemption question turns on the knowledge of the offerees .... The focus of inquiry should be on the need of the offerees for the protections afforded by registration." SEC v. Ralston Purina, 346 US 119, 126-127 (1953). Investors need to be "Sophisticated" investors. If this requirement is met, the company meets the Section 4(a)(2) exemption.

In this case, the employees that were offered the stock option were "rank-and-file" employees. The employees here were not shown to have access to the kind of information which registration would disclose. Therefore, the offering was found to be a "Public Offering," which did not allow Ralston Purina to use the registration exemption.

Every single offeree must meet the "Ralston Purina" requirement or the exemption will not apply.

== Conclusion ==
No. Offerings must be made to individuals who have access to the kind of information that a registration statement would supply in order to be exempt from the filing requirements of Section 5 the Securities Act of 1933.

== See also ==
- List of United States Supreme Court cases, volume 346
