= Harris Associates =

Investment Firm

- Type: Private (subsidiary)
- Industry: Investment Management
- Founded: 1976; 50 years ago
- Founder: Victor Morgenstern
- Headquarters: Chicago, Illinois, U.S.
- Products: Mutual Funds; Asset Management
- AUM: US$107 billion (Q3 2026)
- Number of employees: 221 (August 2026)
- Parent: Natixis Investment Managers (BPCE)
- Website: www.harrisassoc.com

Harris Associates L.P. is a Chicago-based investment company with $107 billion under management as of June 30, 2025. Harris manages long-only U.S. equity, international equity, and global equity strategies, offered through its mutual fund company, the Oakmark Funds, and other types of vehicles. Harris is owned by Natixis Investment Managers, an American-French financial services firm that BPCE owns. Harris Associates fully controls investment decisions, philosophy, and day-to-day operations.

== History ==
Harris Associates was founded in 1976 by Victor Morgenstern, Myron Szold, Roger Brown, Ralph Wanger, Joe Braucher, Peter Foreman, Ed Neisser and Earl Rusnak, who had previously worked in the private investment office of Chicago entrepreneur Irving Harris. Irving Harris was unrelated to the Norman Harris who established Harris Bank..

== Investment philosophy ==
Harris Associates is considered to be a value investor. The investment process entails investing in businesses trading at a discount to intrinsic value. The intrinsic value is based on a discounted cash flow analysis that considers the quality of management and the company's ability to grow. According to research by Morningstar in April 2013. which analyzed the performance of the seven Oakmark funds over five years, four were ranked in at least the top 2% in their relevant categories.

=== Investment managers ===
As of 2020, notable investment managers include Bill Nygren, who joined in 1983, and is known for a value investing approach.

== Supreme Court case ==
In 2009, the U.S. Supreme Court agreed to hear Jones v. Harris Associates, a suit brought in federal court by mutual fund investors against the firm. The mutual fund investors, who are investors in the Oakmark funds, claimed that the funds have overpaid their advisor (Harris Associates), and that the fees that Harris Associates charges Oakmark investors are higher than the fees that Harris charges institutional clients.

The suit was previously thrown out by the United States Court of Appeals for the Seventh Circuit in 2008, with a judge who is a noted free-market backer, Richard Posner, arguing that sometimes marketplaces need to be reined in.

In March 2010, the Supreme Court unanimously vacated the Seventh Circuit's ruling and remanded the case.
