= Jones v. Harris Associates =

- Supreme Court of the United States

Argued November 2, 2009 Decided March 30, 2010
- Full case name: Jerry N. Jones, et al., Petitioners v. Harris Associates L.P.
- Docket no.: 08-586
- Citations: 559 U.S. 335 (more) 130 S. Ct. 1418; 176 L. Ed. 2d 265; 2010 U.S. LEXIS 2926; Fed. Sec. L. Rep. (CCH) ¶ 95,653; 22 Fla. L. Weekly Fed. S 183
- Opinion announcement: Opinion announcement

Case history
- Prior: On writ of certiorari to the United States Court of Appeals for the Seventh Circuit

Holding
- For a claim to be valid under the Investment Company Act fees must be disproportionately large that they cannot be related to the services rendered.

Court membership
- Chief Justice John Roberts Associate Justices John P. Stevens · Antonin Scalia; Anthony Kennedy · Clarence Thomas; Ruth Bader Ginsburg · Stephen Breyer; Samuel Alito · Sonia Sotomayor

Case opinions
- Majority: Alito, joined by unanimous
- Concurrence: Thomas

Laws applied
- Section 36(b)(1) of the Investment Company Act of 1940

Jones v. Harris Associates L.P., 559 U.S. 335 (2010), is a case decided by the United States Supreme Court in which investors claimed that the fees they paid to an investment advisor were too steep, violating the Investment Company Act of 1940.

The case held that the court has the jurisdiction to regulate fees of investment advisers in the mutual fund industry under the Investment Company Act of 1940, when those fees are excessive, and in breach of fiduciary duty. It is notable from a law and economics perspective for the vigorous opinion in the Seventh Circuit Court of Appeal of Judge Frank Easterbrook and the powerful dissent of Richard Posner, regarding the necessity and market failure in respect of adviser fee regulation.

== Background ==
Harris Associates LP was the adviser to a set of $47bn Chicago funds including the Oakmark brands and is owned by French fund Natixis. The mutual funds are ‘open ended’ meaning they buy back shares at current asset value. Harris Associates was sued by Jones and other investors in Harris’ mutual funds. They argued that under the Investment Company Act 1940 s 36(b) and Gartenberg v. Merrill Lynch Asset Management, Inc., 694 F.2d 923 (2d Cir. 1982) the company's fees were unreasonably high.

After an adverse finding in the Illinois District Court, Jones appealed to the Seventh Circuit Court of Appeals.

=== Seventh Circuit ===
The majority of the Court of Appeals ruled against the plaintiffs citing a lack of judicial authority to regulate investment company fees. Easterbrook, reading for the majority, argued that the free market was the best regulator of the fees. Easterbrook rejected the argument, saying the government was in no place to make such an assessment. ‘Like the plaintiffs, the second circuit in Gartenberg expressed some skepticism of competition’s power to constrain investment advisers’ fees.

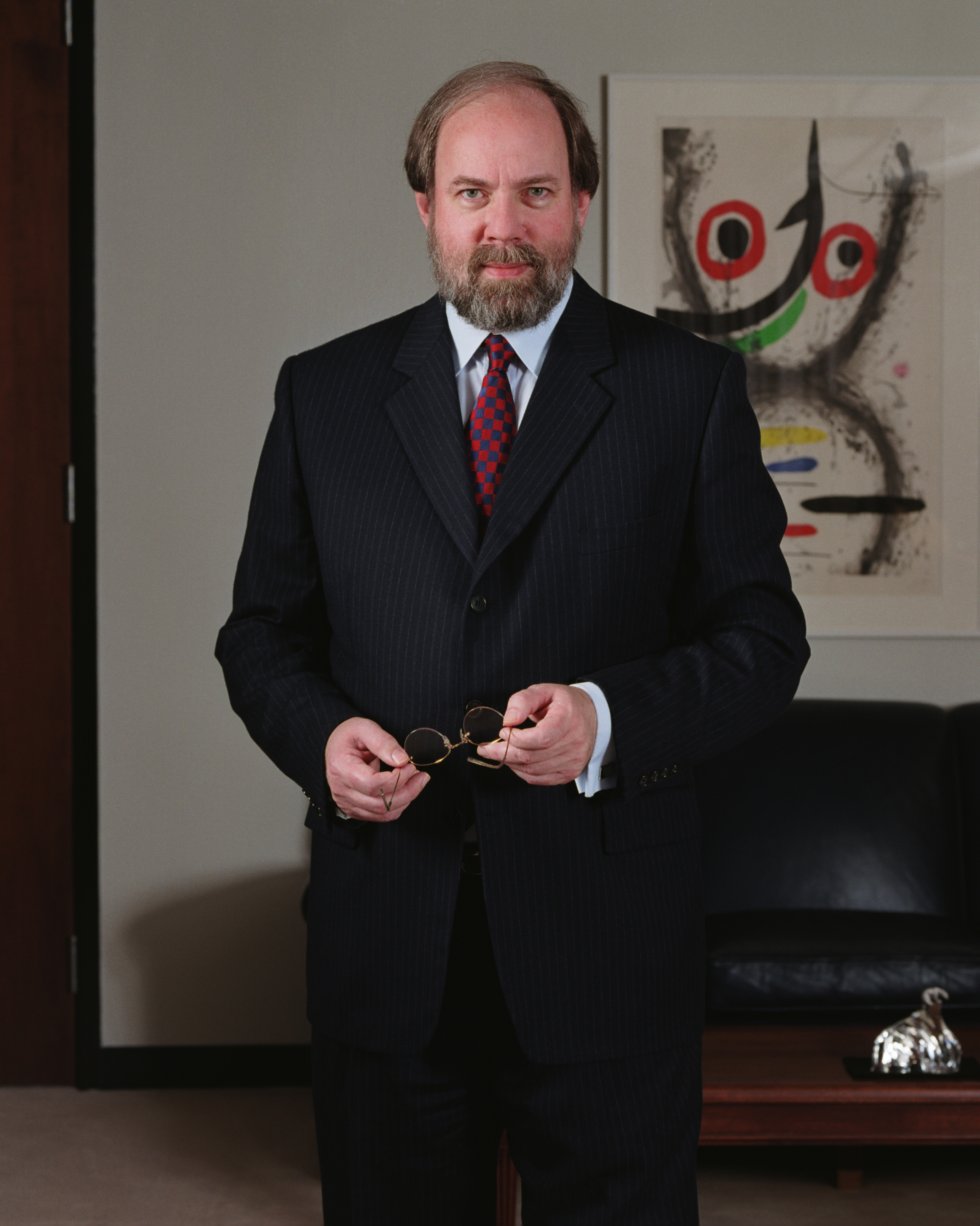
Easterbrook supported a strong free market approach to legislative interpretation.

Competition between [mutual] funds for shareholder business does not support an inference that competition must therefore also exist between adviser-managers for fund business. The former may be vigorous even though the latter is virtually non-existent. Each is governed by different forces. 694 F.2d at 929. The second circuit did not explain why this is so, however. It was content to rely on the observation that mutual funds rarely advertise the level of their management fees, as distinct from the funds’ total expenses as a percentage of assets (a widely publicized benchmark).

Holding costs down is vital in competition, when investors are seeking maximum return net of expenses—and as management fees are a substantial component of administrative costs, mutual funds have a powerful reason to keep them low unless higher fees are associated with higher return on investment. A difference of 0.1% per annum in total administrative expenses adds up by compounding over time and is enough to induce many investors to change mutual funds. That mutual funds are “captives” of investment advisers does not curtail this competition. An adviser can’t make money from its captive fund if high fees drive investors away.

So just as plaintiffs are skeptical of Gartenberg because it relies too heavily on markets, we are skeptical about Gartenberg because it relies too little on markets…

[Easterbrook went on to disapprove Gartenberg.]

...when the settlor or the persons charged with the trust’s administration make a decision, it is conclusive. John H. Langbein, The Contractarian Basis of the Law of Trusts, 105 Yale L. J. 625 (1995). It is possible to imagine compensation so unusual that a court will infer that deceit must have occurred, or that the persons responsible for decision have abdicated—for example, if a university’s board of trustees decides to pay the president $50 million a year, when no other president of a com- parable institution receives more than $2 million—but no court would inquire whether a salary normal among similar institutions is excessive.

Things work the same way for business corporations, which though not trusts are managed by persons who owe fiduciary duties of loyalty to investors. This does not prevent them from demanding substantial compensation and bargaining hard to get it. Publicly traded corporations use the same basic procedures as mutual funds: a committee of independent directors sets the top managers’ compensation. No court has held that this procedure implies judicial review for “reasonableness” of the resulting salary, bonus, and stock options. These are constrained by competition in several markets—firms that pay too much to managers have trouble raising money, because net profits available for distribution to investors are lower, and these firms also suffer in product markets because they must charge more and consumers turn elsewhere. Competitive processes are imperfect but remain superior to a “just price” system administered by the judiciary. However weak competition may be at weeding out errors, the judicial process is worse—for judges can’t be turned out of office or have their salaries cut if they display poor business judgment.’

[Easterbrook said lawyers fees are set in the same way, and the list could be extended to other fiduciaries.]

Judicial price-setting does not accompany fiduciary duties. Section 36(b) does not call for a departure from this norm. Plaintiffs ask us to look beyond the statute’s text to its legislative history, but that history, which Gartenberg explores, is like many legislative histories in containing expressions that seem to support every possible position. Some members of Congress equated fiduciary duty with review for reasonableness; others did not (language that would have authorized review of rates for reasonableness was voted down); the Senate committee report disclaimed any link between fiduciary duty and reasonableness of fees. See 694 F.2d at 928… Congress did not enact its members’ beliefs; it enacted a text….’ ‘Today thousands of mutual funds compete. The pages of the Wall Street Journal teem with listings. People can search for and trade funds over the Internet, with negligible transactions costs… [73 in 1945 to 8,000 in 2002] Mutual funds rarely fire their investment advisers, but investors can and do “fire” advisers cheaply and easily by moving their money elsewhere. Investors do this not when the advisers’ fees are “too high” in the abstract, but when they are excessive in relation to the results—and what is “excessive” depends on the results available from other investment vehicles, rather than any absolute level of compensation.

New entry is common, and funds can attract money only by offering a combination of service and management that investors value, at a price they are willing to pay. Mutual funds come much closer to the model of atomistic competition than do most other markets. Judges would not dream of regulating the price of automobiles, which are produced by roughly a dozen large firms; why then should 8,000 mutual funds seem “too few” to put competitive pressure on advisory fees? A recent, careful study concludes that thousands of mutual funds are plenty, that investors can and do protect their interests by shopping, and that regulating advisory fees through litigation is unlikely to do more good than harm.

It won’t do to reply that most investors are unsophisticated and don’t compare prices. The sophisticated investors who do shop create a competitive pressure that protects the rest. As it happens, the most substantial and sophisticated investors choose to pay substantially more for investment advice than advisers subject to §36(b) receive. A fund that allows only “accredited investors” (i.e., the wealthy) to own non-redeemable shares is exempt from the Investment Company Act. Investment pools that take advantage of this exemption, commonly called hedge funds, regularly pay their advisers more than 1% of the pool’s asset value, plus a substantial portion of any gains from successful strategies. When persons who have the most to invest, and who act through professional advisers, place their assets in pools whose managers receive more than Harris Associates, it is hard to conclude that Harris’s fees must be excessive.

Harris Associates charges a lower percentage of assets to other clients, but this does not imply that it must be charging too much to the Oakmark funds. Different clients call for different commitments of time. Pension funds have low (and predictable) turnover of assets. Mutual funds may grow or shrink quickly and must hold some assets in high-liquidity instruments to facilitate redemptions. That complicates an adviser’s task. Joint costs likewise make it hard to draw inferences from fee levels. Some tasks in research, valuation, and portfolio design will have benefits for several clients. In competition those joint costs are apportioned among paying customers according to their elasticity of demand, not according to any rule of equal treatment.

[Easterbrook said that the Securities Acts are primarily about disclosure and the plaintiffs had their eyes open and concluded...]

As §36(b) does not make the federal judiciary a rate regulator, after the fashion of the Federal Energy Regulatory Commission, the judgment of the district court is affirmed.

Posner, reading a dissenting judgment, argued that the majority's decision ran counter to well established principle in Gartenberg, that the market was ineffective to solve the problem and that procedurally the decision was flawed since it was not circulated prior to publication, as is required in the case of a circuit split. He would have held that the case should be heard en banc (i.e. all the judges of the bench give a full hearing).

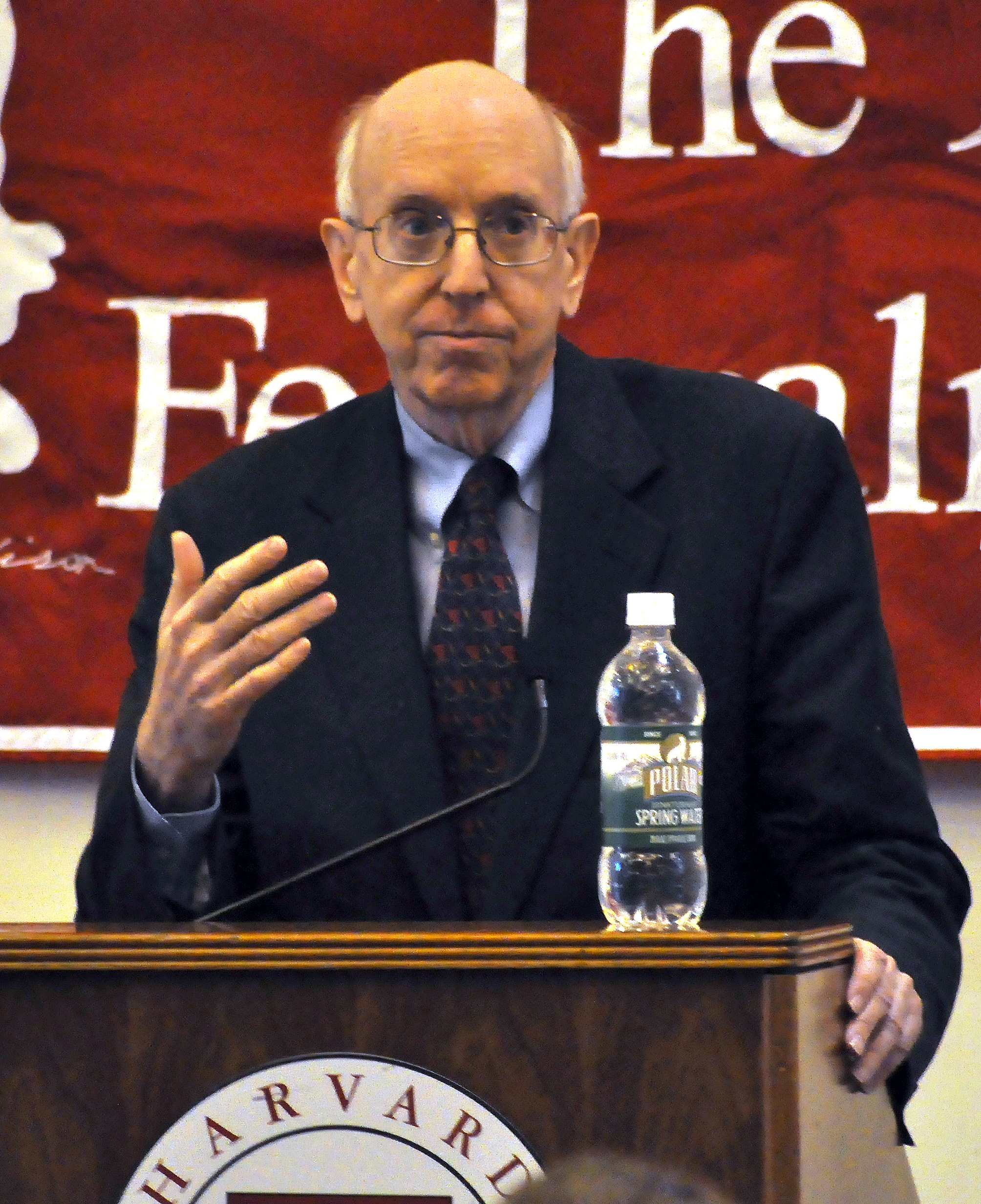
Posner, dissenting, viewed the purpose of the law as being to deal with excessive fees just like in this case.

The panel rejected the approach taken by the Second Circuit in Gartenberg v. Merrill Lynch Asset Management, Inc., 694 F.2d 923 (2d Cir. 1982), to deciding whether a mutual fund adviser has breached his fiduciary duty to the fund, the duty created by section 36(b) of the Investment Company Act, 15 U.S.C. §§ 80a-1 et seq. Gartenberg permits a court to consider, as a factor in determining such a breach, whether the fee is “so disproportionately large that it bears no reasonable relationship to the services rendered and could not have been the product of arm’s-length bargaining.” 694 F.2d at 928. The panel opinion states that it “now disapprove[s] the Gartenberg approach. . . . A fiduciary must make full disclosure and play no tricks but is not subject to a cap on compensation.”

[Posner then noted that Gartenberg has express approval from every case listed on Westlaw.]

The panel bases its rejection of Gartenberg mainly on an economic analysis that is ripe for reexamination on the basis of growing indications that executive compensation in large publicly traded firms often is excessive because of the feeble incentives of boards of directors to police compensation. Directors are often CEOs of other companies and naturally think that CEOs should be well paid. And often they are picked by the CEO. Compensation consulting firms, which provide cover for generous compensation packages voted by boards of directors, have a conflict of interest because they are paid not only for their compensation advice but for other services to the firm—services for which they are hired by the officers whose compensation they advised on. Competition in product and capital markets can’t be counted on to solve the problem because the same structure of incentives operates on all large corporations and similar entities, including mutual funds. Mutual funds are a component of the financial services industry, where abuses have been rampant, as is more evident now than it was when Coates and Hubbard wrote their article. A business school professor at Northwestern University recently observed that “business connections can mitigate agency conflicts by facilitating efficient information transfers, but can also be channels for inefficient favoritism.” She found “evidence that connections among agents in [the mutual fund industry] foster favoritism, to the detriment of investors. Fund directors and advisory firms that manage the funds hire each other preferentially based on past interactions. When directors and the management are more connected, advisors capture more rents and are monitored by the board less intensely. These findings support recent calls for more disclosure regarding the negotiation of advisory contracts by fund boards.” The SEC’s Office of Economic Analysis (the principal adviser to the SEC on the economic aspects of regulatory issues) believes that mutual fund “boards with a greater proportion of independent directors are more likely to negotiate and approve lower fees, merge poorly performing funds more quickly or provide greater investor protection from late-trading and market timing,” although “broad cross-sectional analysis reveals little consistent evidence that board composition is related to lower fees and higher returns for fund shareholders.”

A particular concern in this case is the adviser’s charging its captive funds more than twice what it charges independent funds. According to the figures in the panel opinion, the captives are charged one percent of the first $2 billion in assets while the independents are charged roughly one-half of one percent for the first $500 million and roughly one-third of one percent for everything above. The panel opinion throws out some suggestions on why this difference may be justified, but the suggestions are offered purely as speculation, rather than anything having an evidentiary or empirical basis. And there is no doubt that the captive funds are indeed captive. The Oakmark-Harris relationship matches the arrangement described in the Senate Report accompanying § 36(b): a fund “organized by its investment adviser which provides it with almost all management services.” Financial managers from Harris founded the Oakmark family of funds in 1991, and each year since then the Oakmark Board of Trustees has reselected Harris as the fund’s adviser. Harris manages the entire Oakmark portfolio, which consists of seven funds. The Oakmark prospectus describes the relationship this way: “Subject to the overall authority of the board of trustees, [Harris Associates] furnishes continuous investment supervision and management to the Funds and also furnishes office space, equipment, and management personnel.” Recall Professor Kuhnen’s observation that “when directors and the management are more connected, advisors capture more rents and are monitored by the board less intensely.”

The panel opinion says that the fact “that mutual funds are ‘captives’ of investment advisers does not curtail this competition. An adviser can’t make money from its captive fund if high fees drive investors away.” 527 F.3d at 632. That’s true; but will high fees drive investors away? “[T]he chief reason for substantial advisory fee level differences between equity pension fund portfolio managers and equity mutual fund portfolio managers is that advisory fees in the pension field are subject to a marketplace where arm’s-length bargaining occurs. As a rule, [mutual] fund shareholders neither benefit from arm’s-length bargaining nor from prices that approximate those that arm’s-length bargaining would yield were it the norm.”

The panel opinion acknowledges that the level of compensation of trustees could be “so unusual that a court will infer that deceit must have occurred, or that the persons responsible for [the] decision have abdicated.” 527 F.3d at 632. Compensation that is “so unusual” might not seem to differ materially from compensation that is “so disproportionately large.” But although one industry commentator has suggested that “courts may . . . conclude that in fact what the Court of Appeals has done [in Jones] is merely articulate the Gartenberg standard in a different way,” this misses an important difference between the Gartenberg approach and the panel’s approach. The panel’s “so unusual” standard is to be applied solely by comparing the adviser’s fee with the fees charged by other mutual fund advisers. Gartenberg’s “so disproportionately large” standard is rightly not so limited. The governance structure that enables mutual fund advisers to charge exorbitant fees is industry-wide, so the panel’s comparability approach would if widely followed allow those fees to become the industry’s floor. And in this case there was an alternative comparison, rejected by the panel on the basis of airy speculation—comparison of the fees that Harris charges independent funds with the much higher fees that it charges the funds it controls.

The panel opinion points out that courts do not review corporate salaries for excessiveness. That misses the point, which is that unreasonable compensation can be evidence of a breach of fiduciary duty.

[Posner then noted the majority’s opinion was not circulated in advance of publication as is required.]

‘The outcome of this case may be correct. The panel opinion gives some reasons why, though one of them is weak in its unelaborated form: that the funds managed by Harris have grown faster than the industry norm. One would need to know over what period they had grown faster to know whether other than random factors were at work. But the creation of a circuit split, the importance of the issue to the mutual fund industry, and the one-sided character of the panel’s analysis warrant our hearing the case en banc.

Jones then appealed to the Supreme Court which granted certiorari on March 9, 2009.

== Opinion of the Court ==
The Supreme Court unanimously agreed with the plaintiffs and held the Seventh Circuit erred in holding that claims alleging mutual fund management's fees were too high is not cognizable under Section 36(b) of the Investment Company Act. Justice Alito wrote the majority opinion arguing the Seventh Circuit Court of Appeals erred in not applying the established standard from Gartenberg v. Merrill Lynch Asset Management, Inc.. The Court established that the ICA requires for a claim to be valid there must be a determination that the fee is "so disproportionately large it bears no reasonable relationship to the services rendered."
