= Registration statement =

United States securities filing document

In the United States, a registration statement is a set of documents, including a prospectus, which a company must file with the U.S. Securities and Exchange Commission before it proceeds with a public offering.

As of May 2022, the United States Supreme Court was considering the case of Slack Technologies, LLC v. Pirani, No. 22-200, 598 U.S. ___ (2023), with regard to whether Sections 11 and 12(a)(2) of the Securities Act of 1933 require plaintiffs to plead and prove that they acquired shares of stock registered under and traceable to the registration statement they claim was misleading.

== See also ==
- Securities Act of 1933
- Form S-3
