= SEC Rule 144A =

Rule of the U.S. Securities and Exchange Commission

Rule 144A. Securities Act of 1933, as amended (the "Securities Act") provides a safe harbor from the registration requirements of the Securities Act of 1933 for certain private resales of minimum $500,000 units of restricted securities to qualified institutional buyers (QIBs), which generally are large institutional investors that own at least $100 million in investable assets. When a broker or dealer is selling securities in reliance on Rule 144A, it may make offers to non-QIBs through general solicitations following an amendment to the Rule in 2012.

Since its adoption, Rule 144A has greatly increased the liquidity of the securities affected. This is because the institutions can now trade these formerly restricted securities amongst themselves, thereby eliminating the restrictions that are imposed to protect the public. Rule 144A was implemented to induce foreign companies to sell securities in the US capital markets. For firms registered with the SEC or a foreign company providing information to the SEC, financial statements need not be provided to buyers. Rule 144A has become the principal safe harbor on which non-U.S. companies rely when accessing the U.S. capital markets.

Originally, in 1990, the Nasdaq Stock Market offered a compliance review process which granted The Depository Trust Company (DTC) book-entry access to Rule 144A securities. That review was later abandoned as unnecessary. Nasdaq launched an Electronic Trading Platform for Rule 144A securities called PORTAL.

Rule 144A should not be confused with Rule 144, which permits public (as opposed to private) unregistered resales of restricted and controlled securities within certain limits.
