= Mental Health Parity Act of 1996 =

1996 U.S. law

Mental Health Parity Act
- Other short titles: National Aeronautics and Space Administration Federal Employment Reduction Assistance Act of 1996; Newborns' and Mothers' Health Protection Act of 1996
- Long title: Departments of Veterans Affairs and Housing and Urban Development, and Independent Agencies Appropriations Act, 1997
- Acronyms (colloquial): MHPA
- Enacted by: the 104th United States Congress

Citations
- Public law: Pub. L. 104–204 (text) (PDF)

Legislative history
- Introduced in the House as H.R. 3666 by Jerry Lewis (R–CA) on 18 June 1996; Committee consideration by House Appropriations; Senate Appropriations; Passed the House on 26 June 1996 (269 - 147); Passed the Senate on 5 September 1996 (95 - 2); Reported by the joint conference committee on 20 September 1996; agreed to by the House on 24 September 1996 (388 - 25) and by the Senate on 25 September 1996 (Unanimous Consent); Signed into law by President Bill Clinton on 26 September 1996

The Mental Health Parity Act (MHPA) is legislation signed into United States law on September 26, 1996 that requires annual or lifetime dollar limits on mental health benefits to be no lower than any such dollar limits for medical and surgical benefits offered by a group health plan or health insurance issuer offering coverage in connection with a group health plan. Prior to MHPA and similar legislation, insurers were not required to cover mental health care and so access to treatment was limited.

MHPA was largely superseded by the Paul Wellstone and Pete Domenici Mental Health Parity and Addiction Equity Act (MHPAEA), which the 110th United States Congress passed as rider legislation on the Troubled Asset Relief Program (TARP) in Public Law 110-343, signed into law by President George W. Bush in October 2008. Notably, the 2010 Patient Protection and Affordable Care Act extended the reach of MHPAEA provisions to many health insurance plans outside its previous scope.

== Scope ==
MHPA applies to group health plans for plan years beginning on or after January 1, 1998. The original sunset provision provided that the parity requirements would not apply to benefits for services furnished on or after September 30, 2001. Congress extended the sunset date several times; the final extension, enacted in the Tax Relief and Health Care Act of 2006, ran through December 31, 2007. Insurers promptly were able to "circumvent" the consumer protections arguably intended in the legislation by imposing maximum numbers of provider visits and/or caps on the number of days an insurer would cover for inpatient psychiatric hospitalizations. In essence, the law had little or no effect on mental health coverage by group insurance plans. The rider on TARP prohibits all group health plans that offer mental health coverage from imposing any greater limit on co-pays, co-insurance, numbers of visits, and/or number of days covered for hospital stays due to mental health conditions. The rider legislation was the culmination of a long campaign fought by Sen. Paul Wellstone (D-MN) and his successors to enact mental health parity at the federal level. The new law's requirements was phased over several years

== Requirements ==
Generally the act required parity of mental health benefits with medical and surgical benefits with respect to the application of aggregate lifetime and annual dollar limits under a group health plan. It provided that employers retain discretion regarding the extent and scope of mental health benefits offered to workers and their families, including cost sharing, limits on numbers of visits or days of coverage, and requirements relating to medical necessity.

The law also contained three exemptions:

No mental health coverage
Business that chose not to provide mental health coverage.
Small employers
Businesses with fewer than 50 employees.
Increased cost
Businesses that documented at least one percent increase in premiums due to implementation of parity requirements.

== Issues with MHPA ==
Immediately after MHPA was enacted, insurers and employers began finding ways to circumvent the legislation. Larger emphasis on cost sharing, primarily implemented through higher copayments, deductibles, and out-of-pocket maximums, was one strategy used by insurers. In addition, limits and caps on the number of visits with a care provider or number of days in a hospital visit were imposed. MHPA also did not provide benefits for substance abuse and dependency issues. Lastly, MHPA contained a sunset provision that meant that the law would go out of effect after a certain date. The original sunset date was extended six times, through 2007.

== Mental Health Parity and Addiction Equity Act ==
Paul Wellstone and Pete Domenici Mental Health Parity and Addiction Equity Act of 2008
- Other short titles: Emergency Economic Stabilization Act of 2008; Energy Improvement and Extension Act of 2008; Heartland Disaster Tax Relief Act of 2008; Tax Extenders and Alternative Minimum Tax Relief Act of 2008
- Long title: A bill to provide authority for the Federal Government to purchase and insure certain types of troubled assets for the purposes of providing stability to and preventing disruption in the economy and financial system and protecting taxpayers, to amend the Internal Revenue Code of 1986 to provide incentives for energy production and conservation, to extend certain expiring provisions, to provide individual income tax relief, and for other purposes.
- Acronyms (colloquial): MHPAEA
- Enacted by: the 110th United States Congress
- Effective: 1 January 2010

Citations
- Public law: Pub. L. 110–343 (text) (PDF)
- Statutes at Large: 122 Stat. 3765

Legislative history
- Introduced in the House as H.R. 1424 by Patrick J. Kennedy (D-RI-1) on 9 March 2007; Committee consideration by Energy and Commerce; Education and Labor; Ways and Means; Passed the House on 5 March 2008 (268 - 148); Passed the Senate on 1 October 2008 (74 - 25) with amendment; House agreed to Senate amendment on 3 October 2008 (263 - 171); Signed into law by President George W. Bush on 3 October 2008

The Paul Wellstone and Pete Domenici Mental Health Parity and Addiction Equity Act (MHPAEA) was enacted in October 2008 and took effect on 1 January 2009.

The act requires among other provisions that health insurers as well as group health plans to guarantee that financial requirements on benefits, including co-pays, deductibles, and out-of-pocket maximums, and limitations on treatment benefits such as caps on visits with a provider or days in a hospital visit, for mental health or substance use disorders are not more restrictive than the insurer's requirements and restrictions for medical and surgical benefits.

== INTRODUCTION ==
The Mental Health Parity and Addiction Equity Act of 2008 (MHPAEA) expanded the protections of the Mental Health Parity Act of 1996 beyond annual and lifetime dollar limits, adding protections concerning substance use disorder benefits, cost sharing, and treatment limitations.

Generally, cost sharing and numerical treatment limits for covered mental health and substance use disorder (MH/SUD) benefits may not exceed the predominant requirements applied to substantially all medical/surgical benefits in the same classification. MHPAEA also prohibits separate treatment limits applying only to MH/SUD benefits and requires disclosure of specified information.

MHPAEA does not itself require plans to offer MH/SUD benefits. However, the Affordable Care Act requires non-grandfathered individual and small-group insurance coverage to include these services among its essential health benefits and to provide them in accordance with parity requirements.

Section 203 of Title II of Division BB of the Consolidated Appropriations Act, 2021, enacted on December 27, 2020, required plans and insurers offering both medical/surgical and MH/SUD benefits and imposing non quantitative treatment limitations (NQTLs) on MH/SUD benefits to prepare written comparative analyses of those limitations. The requirement to provide these analyses to federal departments or relevant state authorities on request began on February 10, 2021.

=== Applicability of MHPAEA ===
MHPAEA initially applied to group health coverage; the Affordable Care Act extended its reach to individual health insurance. Federal oversight is divided between agencies: the Departments of Labor and the Treasury oversee private-sector group plans, while the Department of Health and Human Services (HHS) oversees non-Federal governmental plans. State insurance authorities regulate insurance policies, including those purchased by employer plans.

Employer plans may purchase insurance or fund benefits themselves. Under the Protecting Affordable Coverage for Employees Act, the small-employer definition in the Affordable Care Act and Public Health Service Act generally covers employers with 1–50 employees, with states permitted to use 1–100. The Employee Retirement Income Security Act and Internal Revenue Code retain a threshold of 50 or fewer employees. State parity laws may impose additional requirements.

Separate provisions of the Social Security Act apply certain parity requirements to Medicaid managed care, Medicaid alternative benefit plans, and the Children's Health Insurance Program. CMS issued implementing regulations in 2016.

== 2013 MHPAEA Regulation ==
Final implementing regulations were published on November 13, 2013, following interim regulations published on February 2, 2010. The 2013 parity regulations took effect on January 13, 2014, generally applying to plan years, or individual-market policy years, beginning on or after July 1, 2014.

The regulations organize benefits into six classifications: inpatient care within and outside the provider network; outpatient care within and outside the network; emergency care; and prescription drugs. Permitted subdivisions include outpatient office visits and other outpatient services, as well as qualifying provider-network tiers. Where a plan offers MH/SUD benefits, it must provide them in every classification in which it provides medical/surgical benefits.

Within a classification, deductibles and other cumulative financial requirements cannot accumulate separately for MH/SUD benefits and medical/surgical benefits.

The regulations distinguish numerical limits, such as visit caps, from NQTLs, such as prior authorization. For NQTLs, the processes, evidence, and other factors governing MH/SUD benefits must be comparable to those governing medical/surgical benefits and cannot be applied more stringently. This comparison concerns both the written plan and its administration.

The final rules removed the interim rules' exception concerning differences justified by clinically appropriate standards of care. They also clarified parity requirements for intermediate services, such as residential treatment, and for restrictions involving location, facility type, and provider specialty. Plans may still account for clinical standards within the general NQTL framework.

== 2024 MHPAEA Regulations ==
On September 9, 2024, the Departments of Labor, HHS, and the Treasury released amended regulations addressing NQTLs and specifying requirements for the content and submission of comparative analyses.

The changes included:

- Reinforcing restrictions on NQTLs that impose greater burdens on MH/SUD benefits than on medical/surgical benefits, both in plan terms and in practice.
- Requiring evaluation of relevant access data and reasonable corrective action when NQTLs contribute to material differences in access.
- Establishing comparative-analysis requirements addressing matters such as prior authorization, provider networks, and out-of-network reimbursement.
- Prohibiting discriminatory factors and evidentiary standards in the design of NQTLs.
- Implementing the statutory termination of the option for self-funded non-Federal governmental plans to elect exemption from MHPAEA.

The final rule became effective on November 22, 2024, with applicability dates phased across plan or policy years beginning in 2025 and 2026.

=== Subsequent enforcement policy ===
On May 15, 2025, the departments announced that they would not enforce provisions newly introduced by the 2024 rule for failures occurring before a final decision in litigation challenging the rule, plus an additional 18 months. They stated that MHPAEA statutory obligations, including the 2021 comparative-analysis requirements, remained applicable.

In September 2026, the Employee Benefits Security Administration reiterated that approach and identified three priorities for NQTL enforcement: separate treatment limitations and exclusions; medical-necessity standards and review procedures; and network adequacy standards, including provider admission and reimbursement methodologies.

== CMS Fact Sheets ==
=== Implementation challenges ===
The Federal Parity Law and the follow-up regulatory/sub-regulatory guidance is complex and sometimes ambiguous. Solutions are needed to help implement and enforce the Federal Parity Law and applicable state laws. This includes opportunities to help automate and document NQTL comparability analyses in writing and in operation to further validate that the plan is treating MH/SUD coverage requirements/payments in the same manner as medical/surgical care. Several tools exist that can help promote parity compliance including the U.S. DOL Self-Compliance Tool, the CMS Parity Compliance Toolkit for Medicaid/CHIP, the Six Step Parity Compliance Guide, and ClearHealth Quality Institute’s Online Parity Tool.

=== "Carve Outs" ===
One main challenge to the implementation of MHPAEA is what is known as "carve-out" health benefits. This refers to mental health benefits that are purchased by employers separately from medical benefits. The "carve-out" vendor may be separate from any number of other vendors providing medical benefits. The law would require the "carve-out" vendor to ensure parity with medical benefits provided by a separate vendor or vendors. In addition, the legislation itself did not create a mechanism to regularly monitor or evaluate the enforcement or implementation of the act.
