= Form 144 =

Form 144, required under Rule 144, is filed by a person who intends to sell either restricted securities or control securities (i.e., securities held by affiliates). Form 144 is notification to the SEC of this intention to sell and must take place at the time the sell order is placed with the broker-dealer. The securities may be sold within the 90-day period after Form 144 is filed.

On December 6, 2007, the SEC published final rules revising Rule 144 under the Securities Act of 1933, which regulates the resale of restricted securities and securities held by affiliates. The amendments to Rule 144, among other things:

1. Shorten the holding period for affiliate and non-affiliate holders of restricted securities of SEC-reporting companies to six months, subject to certain conditions.
2. Permit unlimited resale by non-affiliate holders of restricted securities by complying only with the current public information condition for resale of restricted securities issued by SEC reporting companies made after the six-month holding period and without complying with any Rule 144 conditions for resale of restricted securities issued by both SEC reporting and non-reporting companies made after a one-year holding period.
3. Permit resale of equity securities by affiliates that meet certain conditions through riskless principal transactions and brokers' transactions in which the broker has published bid and asked quotations for the security in an alternative trading system.
4. Eliminate the manner of sale conditions and ease the volume limitations for resale of debt securities by affiliates.
5. Increase the thresholds that trigger the Form 144 filing requirement to 5,000 shares or $50,000.

The SEC did not adopt previously proposed provisions relating to the tolling of holding periods in connection with hedging transactions.

The amendments became effective on February 15, 2008, and will apply to securities acquired before or after that date.

== Background ==
Rule 144 regulates the resale of "restricted securities" and "control securities" by establishing certain conditions that must be satisfied in order for the resale to be exempt from the Securities Act registration requirements pursuant to Section 4(1) of the Securities Act—a safe harbor from "underwriter" status for the selling security holder.

The conditions include the following:

- There must be adequate current public information available about the issuer;
- If the securities being sold are restricted securities, the security holder must have held the security for a specified holding period;
- The resale must be within specified sales volume limitations;
- The resale must comply with the manner of sale requirements of the rule; and
- The selling security holder must file Form 144 with the SEC if the amount of securities being sold exceeds specified thresholds.

== Amendments to Conditions for Resale of Restricted Securities ==
Restricted Securities of SEC-Reporting Companies. The SEC has reduced the holding period under Rule 144 for restricted securities of SEC-reporting companies held by both affiliates and non-affiliates from one year to six months. Affiliate holders of reporting company securities may now resell their restricted securities after six months, subject to the other Rule 144 requirements. Non-affiliate holders of reporting company securities (who have also not been affiliates during the prior three months) may now resell their restricted securities held between six months and one year subject only to Rule 144's current public information requirement. Any such resale by a non-affiliate after one year will be exempt from all Rule 144 requirements.

Restricted Securities of Non-Reporting Companies. There is still a one-year holding period for affiliate and non-affiliate holders of restricted securities in non-reporting companies under amended Rule 144. After the one-year holding period, non-affiliates may now resell their restricted securities without having to comply with any other Rule 144 requirements; affiliates seeking to resell their restricted securities must still meet all Rule 144 requirements.

The manner of sale requirements of Rule 144 require securities to be sold in "brokers' transactions" or in transactions directly with a "market maker."

The rule includes restrictions on (1) soliciting or arranging for the solicitation of orders to buy the securities in anticipation of, or in connection with, the Rule 144 transaction or (2) making any payment in connection with the offer or sale of the securities to any person other than the broker who executes the order to sell the securities.

The SEC amended these rules to also permit the resale of restricted equity securities by affiliates through riskless principal transactions in which trades are executed at the same price, exclusive of any explicitly disclosed markup or markdown, commission equivalent or other fee, and the rules for a self-regulatory organization permit the transaction to be reported as riskless.3 The amended rule also expands the definition of a "brokers' transaction" for purposes of such resale by permitting a broker to insert bid and ask quotations for the security in an alternative trading system, provided that the broker has published bona fide bid and ask quotations for such security on each of the last 12 business days.

== Resale of Restricted Debt Securities ==
The SEC has eliminated the manner-of-sale requirements for affiliate resale of debt securities, including non-participatory preferred stock (which have debt-like characteristics) and asset-backed securities. The SEC also raised the volume limitations for the resale of debt securities to permit resale in an amount that does not exceed ten percent of a tranche (or a class with respect to non-participatory preferred stock), together with all sales of securities of the same tranche sold for the selling debt security holder within a three-month period.

== Form 144 Filing Triggers ==
The sales thresholds for filing Form 144 have been increased from 500 shares or $10,000 worth of securities to 5,000 shares or $50,000.

== Codified SEC Staff Interpretations ==
The SEC has also codified various staff interpretations relating to Rule 144, including the following:

1. Stating that securities acquired by accredited investors pursuant to Section 4(6) of the Securities Act are considered restricted securities
2. Permitting tacking of holding periods when a company reorganizes into a holding company structure
3. Permitting tacking of holding periods for conversions and exchanges of securities
4. Deeming the acquisition dates for securities acquired pursuant to the cashless exercise of options and warrants as the dates the options or warrants were acquired
5. Permitting a pledgee of restricted securities to sell the pledged securities without having to aggregate the sale with sales by other pledgees from the same pledgor (as long as there is no concerted action by those pledgees), for purposes of the Rule 144 volume limitation condition
6. Permitting the Form 144 representations required from security holders relying on Exchange Act Rule 10b5-1 to be made as of the date the holder adopted a trading plan or gave trading instructions
7. Confirming the unavailability of Rule 144 for the resale of securities by reporting and non-reporting firms

== Analyst Use of Form 144 Filings ==
Insiders have access to information not generally available to the public, so investors may benefit from monitoring how insiders transact in their own shares. Form 144 filings reflect an insider's intention to sell, but do not indicate the motivations for selling. While some studies have shown that insider purchases and sales may be good predictors of future stock performance, insiders may sell for reasons unrelated to non-public information they have. Investors and analysts can find Form 144 filings on EDGAR on the SEC web site.
