= Public Law 110-343 =

US law

- Long title: A bill to provide authority for the Federal Government to purchase and insure certain types of troubled assets for the purposes of providing stability to and preventing disruption in the economy and financial system and protecting taxpayers, to amend the Internal Revenue Code of 1986 to provide incentives for energy production and conservation, to extend certain expiring provisions, to provide individual income tax relief, and for other purposes.
- Enacted by: the 110th United States Congress

Citations
- Public law: Pub. L. 110–343 (text) (PDF)

Legislative history
- Introduced in the House as H.R. 1424 by Patrick J. Kennedy (D-RI) on March 9, 2007; Passed the House on March 5, 2008 (268-148); Passed the Senate on October 1, 2008 (74-25); Agreed to by the House on October 3, 2008 (263-171); Signed into law by President George W. Bush on October 3, 2008

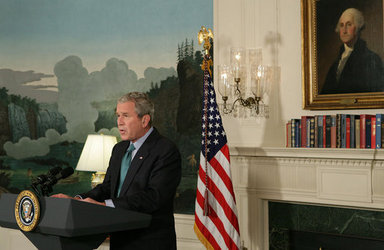
President George W. Bush delivers a statement at the White House regarding the economic rescue plan.

Public Law 110-343 (Pub. L. 110–343 (text) (PDF), 122 Stat. 3765, enacted October 3, 2008) is a US Act of Congress signed into law by U.S. President George W. Bush, which was designed to mitigate the 2008 financial crisis by giving relief to so-called "Troubled Assets."

Its formal title is "An Act To provide authority for the Federal Government to purchase and insure certain types of troubled assets for the purposes of providing stability to and preventing disruption in the economy and financial system and protecting taxpayers, to amend the Internal Revenue Code of 1986 to provide incentives for energy production and conservation, to extend certain expiring provisions, to provide individual income tax relief, and for other purposes."

The Act created a $700 billion (~$998 billion in 2024) Troubled Asset Relief Program under the Emergency Economic Stabilization Act of 2008 (division A), and also enacted the Energy Improvement and Extension Act of 2008 (division B), Tax Extenders and Alternative Minimum Tax Relief Act of 2008 (division C), which also included the Paul Wellstone and Pete Domenici Mental Health Parity and Addiction Equity Act of 2008, and the Heartland Disaster Tax Relief Act of 2008.

== Legislative history ==
The first version of the Emergency Economic Stabilization Act of 2008 (structured as an amendment to H.R. 3997) was rejected by the House of Representatives on September 29, $700 billion (~$998 billion in 2024).

After its defeat, Senate leaders decided to amend an existing bill from the House in order to circumvent the revenue Origination Clause of U.S. Constitution, and chose H.R. 1424 as the vehicle for the legislation. H.R. 1424 was sponsored by United States House Representative Patrick J. Kennedy.

On September 30, 2008, Senate Majority Leader Harry Reid and Minority Leader Mitch McConnell announced the proposed draft had been formalized for the amendment that would transform H.R. 1424 into the Senate version of the Emergency Economic Stabilization Act of 2008.

On October 1, 2008, the amendment to H.R. 1424 was approved by a vote of 74 to 25, and the entire amended bill was passed by 74 to 25, (with one not voting, the cancer-stricken Senator Ted Kennedy). The bill was returned to the House for consideration. On October 3, 2008, the bill as passed by the Senate was accepted by a vote of 263 to 171 in the House. Every member of the House voted, though the House had a vacant seat of the recently deceased Stephanie Tubbs Jones of Ohio. President George W. Bush signed the bill into law a few hours later.

== Divisions ==
=== Emergency Economic Stabilization Act of 2008 ===
The first title of the act included The Emergency Economic Stabilization Act of 2008 which created the Troubled Asset Relief Program in an effort to bail out firms holding mortgage-backed securities and to restore liquidity to the credit markets.

=== Energy Improvement and Extension Act of 2008 ===
The Energy Improvement and Extension Act of 2008 create a new tax credit for qualified plug-in hybrid electric vehicles "purchased between January 1, 2009, and December 31, 2014." This credit was phased out once 250,000 vehicles were sold. The credit is a base $2,500 plus $417 for each kWh of battery pack capacity in excess of 4 kWh to a maximum of $15,000 for any vehicle with a gross vehicle weight rating of more than 26,000 pounds (12,000 kg) and up to $7,500 for 12 kWh or more in passenger cars (vehicles up to 8,500 pounds (3,900 kg) ).

The act also "extended production tax credits (PTC) and investment tax credits (ITC) for various renewable energy sources, which were due to expire at the end of 2008." Included extensions were "energy efficiency tax deductions for commercial buildings through 2013" as well as adding a $300 tax credit for the installation of "energy-efficient biomass fuel stoves" in homes during 2009.

Also included in the act was $800 million in funding for Qualified Energy Conservation Bonds, which were to be issued by state and local governments. Ultimately, the Tax Cuts and Jobs Act of 2017 would repeal the tax credit bonds effective January 1, 2018.

Other existing tax credits for renewable energy initiatives, including cellulosic ethanol and biodiesel development, and wind, solar, geothermal and hydro-electric power were initiated. Electricity had its definition changed to be qualified as an alternative fuel.

Separately, this section also requires the reporting of cost basis by brokers to the IRS for certain securities acquired after 2011 – see covered security.

=== Tax Extenders and Alternative Minimum Tax Relief Act of 2008 ===
The Tax Extenders and Alternative Minimum Tax Relief Act includes $100 billion in tax breaks for businesses and the middle class, plus a provision to raise the cap on federal deposit insurance from $100,000 to $250,000.

The Act keeps the alternative minimum tax from hitting 20 million middle-income Americans. It provides $8 billion in tax relief for those hit by natural disasters in the Midwest, Texas and Louisiana.

As a whole, the Senate tax package would cost $150.5 billion over 10 years. Roughly $43.5 billion would be offset by several revenue-raising provisions. Hedge fund managers would be forbidden from using offshore corporations to defer paying taxes.

The bill freezes a tax deduction that oil and gas companies get for certain domestic production activities. The deduction, now 6 percent, is scheduled to rise to 9 percent in 2010.

The provisions of the tax bill included:

- A temporary increase in Federal Deposit Insurance Corporation deposit insurance limit from $100,000 to $250,000 until December 2009
- Tax breaks for businesses
- Tax credits for the use of alternative energy and plug-in hybrids
- Tax credits for research and development
- Expansion of the child tax credit
- Protection from the Alternative Minimum Tax
- Tax reductions for victims of severe weather (e.g. tornadoes, floods, hurricanes)
- Extension of unemployment insurance
- A USD $1,000 tax credit for low income homeowners
- Tax breaks and credit extensions for the following:
  - "Certain wooden arrows designed for use by children" (Sec 503)
  - Wool research (Sec. 325)
  - Film and television productions (Sec. 502)
  - Litigants in the 1989 Exxon-Valdez oil spill (Sec. 504)
  - Virgin Island and Puerto Rican rum (Section 308)
  - American Samoa (Sec. 309)
  - Mine rescue teams (Sec. 310)
  - Mine safety equipment (Sec. 311)
  - Domestic production activities in Puerto Rico (Sec. 312)
  - Indian tribes (Sec. 314, 315)
  - Railroads (Sec. 316)
  - Auto racing tracks (317)
  - District of Columbia (Sec. 322)

==== Paul Wellstone and Pete Domenici Mental Health Parity and Addiction Equity Act of 2008 ====
The Paul Wellstone and Pete Domenici Mental Health Parity and Addiction Equity Act of 2008 (a part of Division C) mandates that if U.S. health insurance companies provide coverage for mental health and substance abuse, the coverage must be equal for conditions such as psychological disorders, alcoholism, and drug addiction. This act continues and expands upon the previous Mental Health Parity Act of 1996. It states that financial requirements such as deductibles and copayments and lifetime or dollar limits to mental health benefits and substance abuse disorder benefits should be no more restrictive than those on medical and surgical benefits. MHPAEA applies to employer-sponsored health insurance plans with more than 50 employees, though parity is also extended to small group and individual plans under the Affordable Care Act.

==== Secure Rural Schools and Community Self-Determination Act of 2000 ====
The Secure Rural Schools and Community Self-Determination Act of 2000 (a part of Division C) provided $1.645 billion (~$2.84 billion in 2024) in funding over a four-year period for re-authorization of the aforementioned act. Original funding for the "authorization for the program expired in 2006" followed by Congress providing one year extensions in the intervening periods. The funding was distributed to states "to improve cooperative relationships among—the people that use and care for Federal land".

== Cost ==
The Act increased the statutory limit on the public debt by US$700 billion to US$11.3 trillion. However, the legislation is designed to have a net zero long-term cost, and includes language that mandates the President and Congress to develop a plan to recoup any money that is not recouped within 5 years.

== Reception ==
Supporters of the bill believed that it was necessary in "preventing the collapse of the financial system and a deep recession". Critics asserted that the bill "unfairly benefited investors" while also failing to provide an adequate response to the economic crisis of the time. Journalists commented that portions of the bill contained earmarks and pork barrel spending.
