= National Securities Markets Improvement Act of 1996 =

- Long title: An Act to amend the Federal securities laws in order to promote efficiency and capital formation in the financial markets, and to amend the Investment Company Act of 1940 to promote more efficient management of investment companies, and for other purposes.
- Enacted by: the 104th United States Congress

Citations
- Public law: Pub. L. 104–290 (text) (PDF)
- Statutes at Large: 110 Stat. 3416

Codification
- Acts amended: Securities Act of 1933, Securities Exchange Act of 1934, Investment Company Act of 1940, Investment Advisers Act of 1940

Legislative history
- Introduced in the House as H.R. 3005 by Jack Fields on March 5, 1996; Committee consideration by Commerce; Passed the House on June 19, 1996 (407–8); Passed the Senate on June 27, 1996 (Unanimous consent) with amendment; House agreed to Senate amendment on September 28, 1996 (Voice vote) with further amendment; Senate agreed to House amendment on October 1, 1996 (Unanimous consent); Signed into law by President Bill Clinton on October 11, 1996

The National Securities Markets Improvement Act of 1996 is an amendment to United States federal securities laws in with the aim of promote efficiency and capital formation in the financial markets, and to amend the Investment Company Act of 1940 to promote more efficient management of mutual funds, protect investors, and provide more effective and less burdensome regulation between states and the Federal Government.

== Changes ==
The law made substantial changes to the competing systems of securities regulation at the state and federal level.

One of its provisions declares that any offering of a "covered security" (as defined within the act) is exempt from state registration and review.

Covered securities include the following:

- Nationally traded securities - for example, securities listed or authorized for listing on the NYSE or included or qualified for inclusion in Nasdaq;
- Securities of a registered investment company (i.e., mutual funds); and
- Offers and sales of certain exempt securities

Among the covered securities are any securities offered pursuant to S.E.C. Rule 506.

In effect, the NSMIA gave the SEC exclusive jurisdiction to regulate securities firms.

In addition, NSMIA added new section 3(c)(7) of the Investment Company Act to create an alternative exclusion for investment companies that sell their securities solely to investors who are "qualified purchasers".

Section 209 of NSMIA removed a limitation on the number of "qualified purchasers" (i.e. participants) in a hedge fund, leading to large increases in total hedge fund investments. In particular, this provision led to a large increase in the number of university endowments, pension funds, and other institutional investors that participated in hedge funds.

== See also ==
- Uniform Securities Act
- Uniform Securities Agent State Law Examination (Series 63)

== Sources ==
- National Securities Markets Improvement Act of 1996 (Enrolled as Agreed to or Passed by Both House and Senate) [H.R.3005.ENR]
