= Face-amount certificate company =

A face-amount certificate company is an investment company which offers an investment certificate as defined by the United States Investment Company Act of 1940. In general, these companies issue fixed income debt securities that obligate the issuer to pay a fixed sum at a future date. They are generally sold on an installment basis.

A face-amount certificate (FAC) is a contract between an investor and an issuer in which the issuer guarantees payment of a stated (face amount) sum to the investor at some set date in the future. In return for this future payment, the investor agrees to pay the issuer a set amount of money either as a lump sum or in periodic installments. If the investor pays for the certificate in a lump sum, the investment is known as a fully paid face amount certificate.

Issuers of these investments are face-amount certificate companies. Very few face-amount certificate companies operate today because tax law changes have eliminated their tax advantages. The most notable financial services companies in the face-amount certificate business today are Ameriprise Financial and SBM Financial Group.

Along with FAC, other company types that fall under the scope of the Investment Company Act of 1940 are Unit Investment Trusts and Management Companies.

== See also ==
- ICA 1940
- US corporate law
