= Slack Technologies, LLC v. Pirani =

- Supreme Court of the United States

Decided June 1, 2023
- Full case name: Slack Technologies, LLC v. Pirani
- Docket no.: 22-200
- Citations: 598 U.S. 759 (more)

Holding
- To state a claim under Section 11(a) of the Securities Act of 1933, a plaintiff must plead and prove that he purchased "such security" that is "traceable to the allegedly defective registration statement".

Court membership
- Chief Justice John Roberts Associate Justices Clarence Thomas · Samuel Alito; Sonia Sotomayor · Elena Kagan; Neil Gorsuch · Brett Kavanaugh; Amy Coney Barrett · Ketanji Brown Jackson

Case opinion
- Majority: Gorsuch, joined by unanimous

Laws applied
- Securities Act of 1933

Slack Technologies, LLC v. Pirani, 598 U.S. 759 (2023), was a United States Supreme Court case in which the Court unanimously held that to state a claim under Section 11(a) of the Securities Act of 1933, a plaintiff must plead and prove that he purchased "such security" that is "traceable to the allegedly defective registration statement".

== Decision ==
Section 11 of the Securities Act of 1933 requires a plaintiff to plead and prove that the securities purchased were registered under a materially misleading registration statement. The provision permits a claim for a material misstatement or omission when the plaintiff has acquired "such security." In Slack Technologies, LLC v. Pirani, the Supreme Court considered whether "such security" referred only to securities issued pursuant to the allegedly misleading registration statement or also encompassed securities not registered under that statement. Slack is a technology company that offers a platform for instant messaging. It went public through a direct listing on the NYSE in 2019. As part of that process, Slack filed a registration statement for a specified number of registered shares it intended to offer in its direct listing. The Court concluded that the term referred to securities issued under the particular registration statement at issue.

== Subsequent developments ==
The case was remanded to the Ninth Circuit, which held in 2025 that because the plaintiff previously conceded that he could not make the required showing that the securities that he purchased were traceable to the particular registration statement alleged to be false or misleading, all of his claims failed, and the court consequently reversed and remanded with instructions to dismiss the complaint in full and with prejudice.
