= Investment Company Act of 1940 =

United States act of Congress which regulates investment funds

- Acronyms (colloquial): '40 Act
- Enacted by: the 76th United States Congress

Citations
- Public law: Pub. L. 76–768
- Statutes at Large: 54 Stat. 789

Codification
- U.S.C. sections created: 15 U.S.C. §§ 80a-1–80a-64

Legislative history
- Introduced in the House of Representatives as H.R. 10065 by Clarence Lea (D–CA) on June 13, 1940; Committee consideration by House Committee on Interstate and Foreign Commerce, Senate Committee on Banking and Currency; Passed the House of Representatives on August 1, 1940 (Passed unanimously); Passed the Senate on August 8, 1940 (Passed unanimously); Signed into law by President Franklin D. Roosevelt on August 22, 1940

Major amendments
- Dodd-Frank Act of 2010

United States Supreme Court cases
- Jones v. Harris Associates, 559 U.S. 335 (2010); FS Credit Opportunities Corp. v. Saba Capital Master Fund, No. 24-345, 608 U.S. ___ (2026)

The Investment Company Act of 1940 (commonly referred to as the '40 Act) is an act of Congress which regulates investment funds. It was passed as a United States Public Law (Pub. L. 76–768) on August 22, 1940, and is codified at 15 U.S.C. §§ 80a-1–80a-64. Along with the Securities Exchange Act of 1934, the Investment Advisers Act of 1940, and extensive rules issued by the U.S. Securities and Exchange Commission, it is central to financial regulation in the United States. It has been updated by the Dodd-Frank Act of 2010. It is the primary source of regulation for mutual funds and closed-end funds, now a multi-trillion dollar investment industry. The 1940 Act also impacts the operations of hedge funds, private equity funds and even holding companies.

== History ==
Following the founding of the mutual fund in 1924, investors invested in this new investment vehicle heavily. Five and a half years later, the Wall Street crash of 1929 occurred in the stock market, followed shortly thereafter by the United States entry into the Great Depression. In response to this crisis, the United States Congress wrote into law the Securities Act of 1933 and the Securities Exchange Act of 1934.

In 1935, Congress requested that the SEC report on the industry, and the Investment Trust Study was reported between 1938 and 1940. The law as originally introduced was different from the law which passed; the original draft granted more broad power to the SEC, while the final bill was a compromise between the SEC and industry which was drafted and submitted to Congress by joint members of the SEC and industry, and Congress ultimately passed a similar version, unanimously. David Schenker, who became the head of the Investment Company Division at the SEC, was one of the original drafters.

By 1992, the act had remained largely unchanged aside from amendments in 1970 to provide additional protections particularly around independent boards and limiting fees and expenses.

== Scope ==
The act's purpose, as stated in the bill, is "to mitigate and ... eliminate the conditions ... which adversely affect the national public interest and the interest of investors". Specifically, the act regulated conflicts of interest in investment companies and securities exchanges. It seeks to protect the public primarily by legally requiring disclosure of material details about each investment company. The act also places some restrictions on certain mutual fund activities such as short selling shares. However, the act did not create provisions for the U.S. Securities and Exchange Commission (SEC) to make specific judgments about or even supervise an investment company's actual investment decisions. The act requires investment companies to publicly disclose information about their own financial health.

== Jurisdiction ==
The Investment Company Act applies to all investment companies, but exempts several types of investment companies from the act's coverage. The most common exemptions are found in Sections 3(c)(1) and 3(c)(7) of the act and include hedge funds.

In October 2021, over 60 law firms issued an "extremely unusual joint statement" that special-purpose acquisition companies (SPACs) are subject to regulation under the Act when the SPAC does not acquire an operational business within one year of offering company shares to the public. The statement followed opposition from Yale law professor John Morley and New York University law professor Robert Jackson regarding the dismissal of a lawsuit against the blank-check company GO Acquisition Corp. that had been filed on behalf of an investor.

=== Scale ===
When Congress wrote the act into federal law, rather than leaving the matter up to the individual states, it justified its action by including in the text of the bill its rationale for enacting the law:

The activities of such companies, extending over many states, their use of the instrumentalities of interstate commerce and the wide geographic distribution of their security holders, make difficult, if not impossible, effective state regulation of such companies in the interest of investors.

=== Type ===
The act divides the types of investment company to be regulated into three classifications:

- Face-amount certificate company: an investment company in the business of issuing face-amount certificates of the installment type.
- Unit investment trust: an investment company which is organized under a trust indenture, contract of custodianship or agency, or similar instrument, does not have a board of directors, and issues only redeemable securities, each of which represents an undivided interest in a unit of specified securities; but does not include a voting trust.
- Management company: any investment company other than a face-amount certificate company or a unit investment trust. The most well-known type of management company is the mutual fund.

== Contents ==
- Sec. 1. Findings and Declaration of Policy.
- Sec. 2. General Definitions.
- Sec. 3. Definition of Investment Company.
- Sec. 4. Classification of Investment Companies.
- Sec. 5. Subclassification of Management Companies.
- Sec. 6. Exemptions.
- Sec. 7. Transactions by Unregistered Investment Companies.
- Sec. 8. Registration of Investment Companies.
- Sec. 9. Ineligibility of Certain Affiliated Persons and Underwriters.
- Sec. 10. Affiliations of Directors.
- Sec. 11. Offers of Exchange.
- Sec. 12. Functions and Activities of Investment Companies.
- Sec. 13. Changes in Investment Policy.
- Sec. 14. Size of Investment Companies.
- Sec. 15. Investment Advisory and Underwriting Contracts.
- Sec. 16. Changes in Board of Directors; Provisions Relative to Strict Trusts.
- Sec. 17. Transactions of Certain Affiliated Persons and Underwriters.
- Sec. 18. Capital Structure.
- Sec. 19. Dividends.
- Sec. 20. Proxies; Voting Trusts; Circular Ownership.
- Sec. 21. Loans.
- Sec. 22. Distribution, Redemption, and Repurchase of Redeemable Securities.
- Sec. 23. Distribution and Repurchase of Securities: Closed-End Companies.
- Sec. 24. Registration of Securities Under Securities Act of 1933.
- Sec. 25. Plans of Reorganization.
- Sec. 26. Unit Investment Trusts.
- Sec. 27. Periodic Payment Plans.
- Sec. 28. Face-Amount Certificate Companies.
- Sec. 29. Bankruptcy of Face-Amount Certificate Companies.
- Sec. 30. Periodic and Other Reports; Reports of Affiliated Persons.
- Sec. 31. Accounts and Records.
- Sec. 32. Accountants and Auditors.
- Sec. 33. Filing of Documents With Commission in Civil Actions.
- Sec. 34. Destruction and Falsification of Reports and Records.
- Sec. 35. Unlawful Representations and Names.
- Sec. 36. Breach of Fiduciary Duty.
- Sec. 37. Larceny and Embezzlement.
- Sec. 38. Rules, Regulations, and Orders; General Powers of Commission.
- Sec. 39. Rules and Regulations; Procedure for Issuance.
- Sec. 40. Orders; Procedure for Issuance.
- Sec. 41. Hearings by Commission.
- Sec. 42. Enforcement of Title.
- Sec. 43. Court Review of Orders.
- Sec. 44. Jurisdiction of Offenses and Suits.
- Sec. 45. Information Filed With Commission.
- Sec. 46. Annual Reports of Commission; Employees of the Commission.
- Sec. 47. Validity of Contracts.
- Sec. 48. Liability of Controlling Persons; Preventing Compliance With Title.
- Sec. 49. Penalties.
- Sec. 50. Effect on Existing Law.
- Sec. 51. Separability of Provisions.
- Sec. 52. Short Title.
- Sec. 53. Effective Date.
- Sec. 54. Election to Be Regulated As A Business Development Company.
- Sec. 55. Functions and Activities of Business Development Companies.
- Sec. 56. Qualifications of Directors.
- Sec. 57. Transactions With Certain Affiliates.
- Sec. 58. Changes in Investment Policy.
- Sec. 59. Incorporation of Provisions.
- Sec. 60. Functions and Activities of Business Development Companies.
- Sec. 61. Capital Structure.
- Sec. 62. Loans.
- Sec. 64. Accounts and Records.
- Sec. 65. Liability of Controlling Persons; Preventing Compliance With Title.

== Summary of notable provisions ==
Sections 1 – 5 define terms and classify investment companies. The definition of investment company also includes some exemptions.

In addition to exemptions in the definitions, section 6 describes additional exemptions, with 6(c) notably giving the SEC broad discretion to "conditionally or unconditionally exempt any person ... from any provision". One of the original drafters, David Schenker (who became the head of the Investment Company Division at the SEC), explained the provision in 1940 by pointing to the complexities of the industry. This was notably used to exempt venture capital firms in the 1970s, which preceded changes to the statute, ultimately including a section 3(c)(7) which exempts issuers of non-public securities to qualified purchasers. Section 3(c)(11) generally exempts collective trust funds.

Section 7 prohibits investment companies from doing business until registration, including public offerings; in 2018, the SEC acted against a cryptocurrency hedge fund for allegedly violating section 7. Section 7(d) is notable in that it restricts foreign investment firms from offering securities, and by 1992 no foreign firms had registered since 1973.

Section 9 outlines disqualification provisions which restrict people who have committed misconduct from practice in the industry; in practice, the SEC has historically granted waivers to allow such persons to remain involved.

Various provisions restrict the powers of investment companies in corporate governance over management particularly in transactions with affiliates, including section 10. These laws were passed as a reaction to self-dealing excesses in the 1920s and 1930s, where funds would, for example, dump worthless stocks into certain funds, saddling investors with their losses.

== Filings ==
To register, a firm initially files a notification with Form N-8A, followed by a form which depends on the type of fund.

Among others, firms with open-end funds must file Form 24F-2.

== See also ==
- Jones v. Harris Associates
- Alternative Investment Fund Managers Directive
- Securities regulation in the United States
- Commodity Futures Trading Commission
- Securities commission
- Chicago Stock Exchange
- Financial regulation
- NASDAQ
- New York Stock Exchange
- Stock exchange
- Regulation D (SEC)

Related legislation

- 1933 – Securities Act of 1933
- 1934 – Securities Exchange Act of 1934
- 1938 – Temporary National Economic Committee (establishment)
- 1939 – Trust Indenture Act of 1939
- 1940 – Investment Advisers Act of 1940
- 1968 – Williams Act (Securities Disclosure Act)
- 1975 – Securities Acts Amendments of 1975
- 1982 – Garn–St. Germain Depository Institutions Act
- 1999 – Gramm-Leach-Bliley Act
- 2000 – Commodity Futures Modernization Act of 2000
- 2002 – Sarbanes–Oxley Act
- 2006 – Credit Rating Agency Reform Act of 2006
- 2010 – Dodd–Frank Wall Street Reform and Consumer Protection Act
