= Securities Act of 1933 =

US federal law regulating securities

- Long title: An act to provide full and fair disclosure of the character of securities sold in interstate and foreign commerce and through the mails, and to prevent frauds in the sale thereof, and for other purposes.
- Nicknames: Securities Act; 1933 Act '33 Act
- Enacted by: the 73rd United States Congress
- Effective: May 27, 1933

Citations
- Public law: Pub. L. 73–22
- Statutes at Large: 48 Stat. 74

Codification
- U.S.C. sections created: 15 U.S.C. § 77a et seq.

Legislative history
- Signed into law by President Franklin D. Roosevelt on May 27, 1933

United States Supreme Court cases
- SEC v. W. J. Howey Co., 328 U.S. 293 (1946); SEC v. Ralston Purina Co., 346 U.S. 119 (1953); Rodriguez de Quijas v. Shearson/American Express, 490 U.S. 477 (1989); Liu v. SEC, No. 18-1501, 591 U.S. ___ (2020); Slack Technologies, LLC v. Pirani, No. 22-200, 598 U.S. ___ (2023)

The Securities Act of 1933, also known as the 1933 Act, the Securities Act, the Truth in Securities Act, the Federal Securities Act, and the '33 Act, was enacted by the United States Congress on May 27, 1933, during the Great Depression and after the stock market crash of 1929. It is an integral part of United States securities regulation. It is legislated pursuant to the Interstate Commerce Clause of the Constitution.

It requires every offer or sale of securities that uses the means and instrumentalities of interstate commerce to be registered with the SEC pursuant to the 1933 Act, unless an exemption from registration exists under the law. The term "means and instrumentalities of interstate commerce" is extremely broad and it is virtually impossible to avoid the operation of the statute by attempting to offer or sell a security without using an "instrumentality" of interstate commerce. Any use of a telephone, for example, or the mails might be enough to subject the transaction to the statute.

== History ==
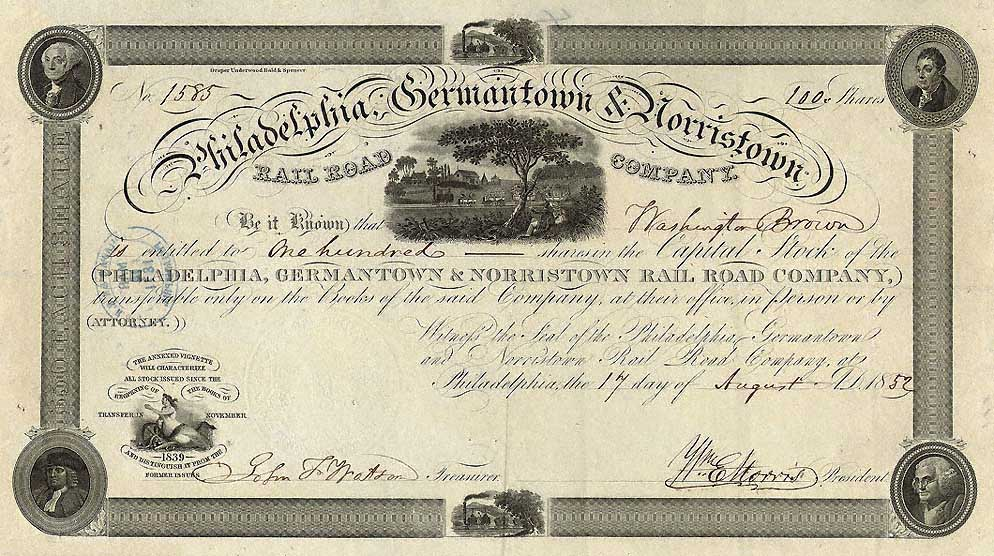
Philadelphia, Germantown & Norristown Railroad stock certificate, 1852

The 1933 Act was the first major federal legislation to regulate the offer and sale of securities. Prior to the Act, regulation of securities was chiefly governed by state laws, commonly referred to as blue sky laws. When Congress enacted the 1933 Act, it left existing state blue sky securities laws in place. It was originally enforced by the FTC, until the SEC was created by the Securities Exchange Act of 1934.

The original law was separated into two titles. Title I is formally entitled the Securities Act of 1933, while title 2 is the Corporation of Foreign Bondholders Act, 1933. In 1939, the Trust Indenture Act of 1939 was added as Title 3. The original Title I contained 26 sections. In 1980, the Small Business Issuers' Simplification Act of 1980 amended section 4. In 1995, section 27 was added by the Private Securities Litigation Reform Act.

The 1933 Act is based upon a philosophy of disclosure, meaning that the goal of the law is to require issuers to fully disclose all material information that a reasonable shareholder would need in order to make up his or her mind about the potential investment. This is very different from the philosophy of the blue sky laws, which generally impose so-called "merit reviews". Blue sky laws often impose very specific, qualitative requirements on offerings, and if a company does not meet the requirements in that state then it simply will not be allowed to do a registered offering there, no matter how fully its faults are disclosed in the prospectus. The National Securities Markets Improvement Act of 1996 added a new Section 18 to the 1933 Act which preempts blue sky law merit review of certain kinds of offerings.

Part of the New Deal, the Act was drafted by Benjamin V. Cohen, Thomas Corcoran, and James M. Landis, and signed into law by President Franklin D. Roosevelt.

== Purpose ==
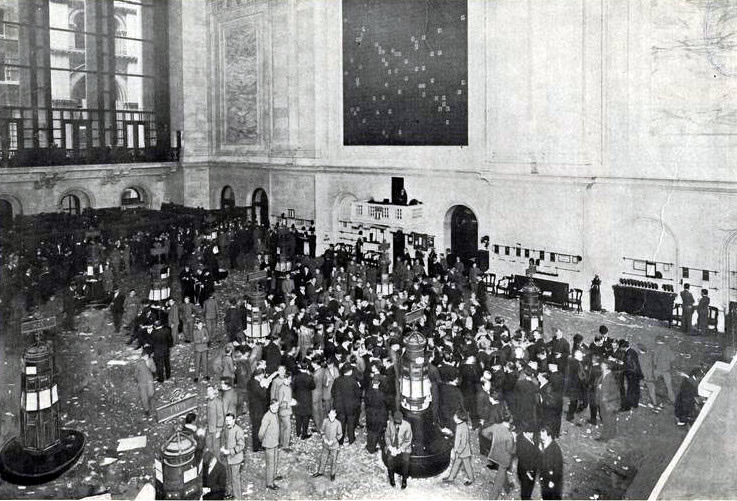
The floor of the New York Stock Exchange in 1908

The primary purpose of the '33 Act is to ensure that buyers of securities receive complete and accurate information before they invest in securities. Unlike state blue sky laws, which impose merit reviews, the '33 Act embraces a disclosure philosophy, meaning that in theory, it is not illegal to sell a bad investment, as long as all the facts are accurately disclosed. A company that is required to register under the '33 act must create a registration statement, which includes a prospectus, with copious information about the security, the company, the business, including audited financial statements. The company, the underwriter and other individuals signing the registration statement are strictly liable for any inaccurate statements in the document. This extremely high level of liability exposure drives an enormous effort, known as "due diligence", to ensure that the document is complete and accurate. The law bolsters and helps to maintain investor confidence which in turn supports the stock market.

== Registration process ==
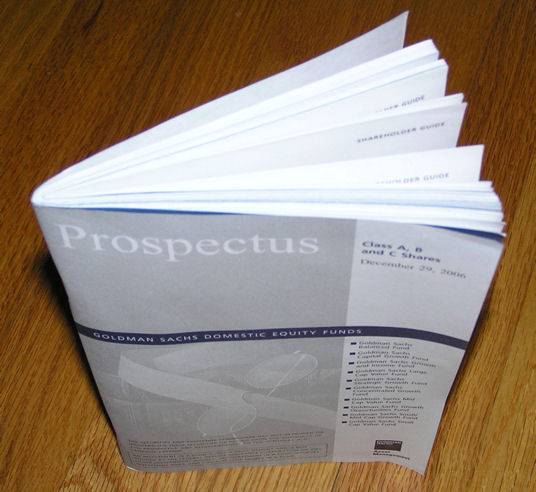
A prospectus in the US

Unless they qualify for an exemption, securities offered or sold to a United States Person must be registered by filing a registration statement with the SEC. Although the law is written to require registration of securities, it is more useful as a practical matter to consider the requirement to be that of registering offers and sales. If person A registers a sale of securities to person B, and then person B seeks to resell those securities, person B must still either file a registration statement or find an available exemption.

The prospectus, which is the document through which an issuer's securities are marketed to a potential investor, is included as part of the registration statement. The SEC prescribes the relevant forms on which an issuer's securities must be registered. The law describes required disclosures in Schedule A and Schedule B; however, in 1982, the SEC created Regulation S-K to consolidate duplicate information into an "integrated disclosure system". Among other things, registration forms call for:

- a description of the securities to be offered for sale;
- information about the management of the issuer;
- information about the securities (if other than common stock); and
- financial statements certified by independent accountants.

Registration statements and the incorporated prospectuses become public shortly after they are filed with the SEC. The statements can be obtained from the SEC's website using EDGAR. Registration statements are subject to SEC examination for compliance with disclosure requirements. It is illegal for an issuer to lie in, or to omit material facts from, a registration statement or prospectus. Furthermore, when some true fact is disclosed, even if disclosing the fact would not have been required, it is illegal to not provide all other information required to make the fact not misleading.

=== Exemptions ===
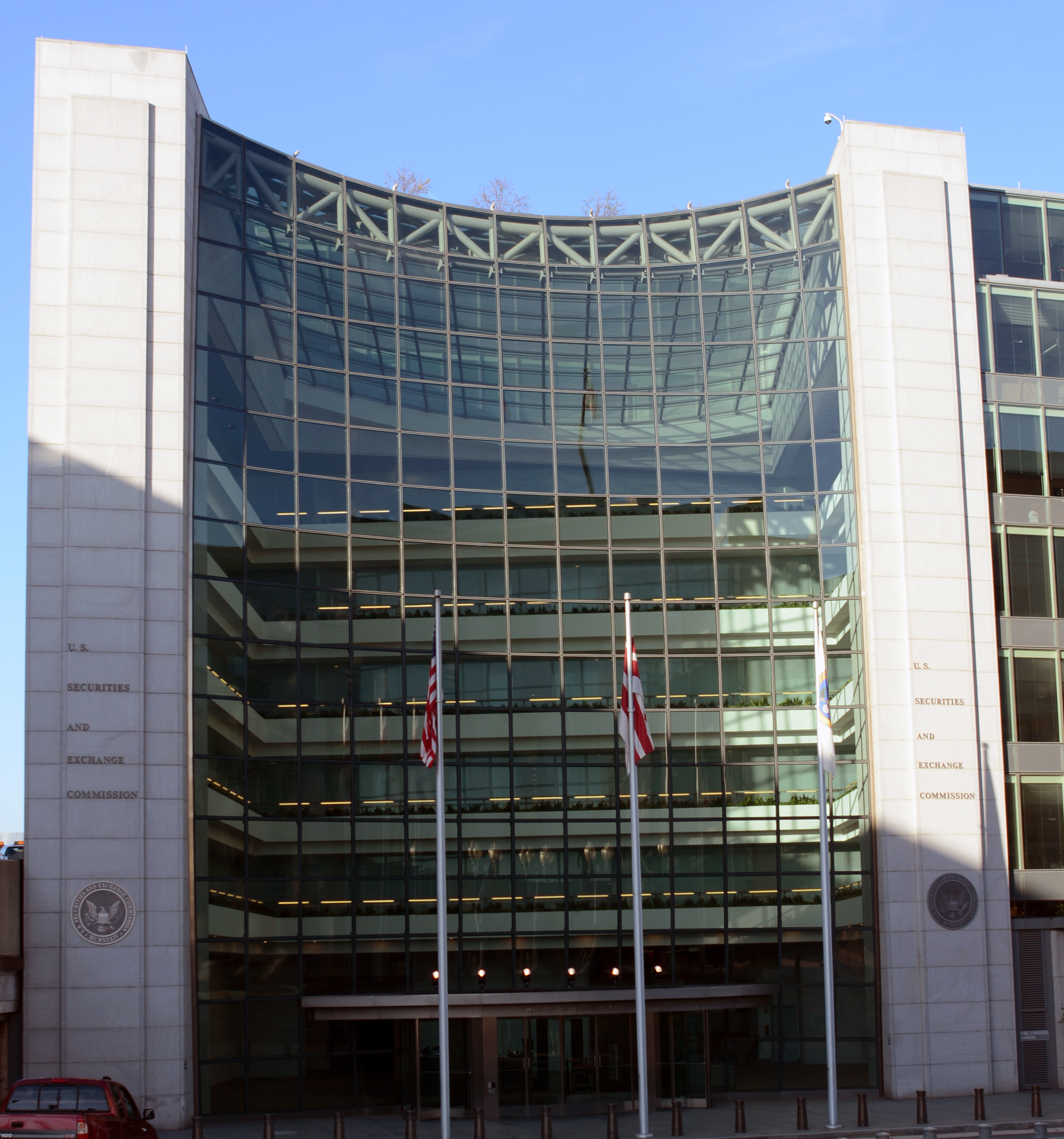
US Securities and Exchange Commission Office in Washington, D.C.

Not all offerings of securities must be registered with the SEC. Section 3(a) outlines various classes of exempt securities, and Section 3(b) allows the SEC to write rules exempting securities if the agency determines that registration is not needed due to "the small amount involved or the limited character of the public offering". Section (4)(a)(2) exempts "transactions by an issuer not involving any public offering" which has historically created confusion due to the lack of a specific definition of "public offering"; the Supreme Court provided clarification in SEC v. Ralston Purina Co.

Some exemptions from the registration requirements include:

- private offerings to a specific type or limited number of persons or institutions;
- offerings of limited size;
- intrastate offerings; and
- securities of municipal, state, and federal governments.

Regardless of whether securities must be registered, the 1933 Act makes it illegal to commit fraud in conjunction with the offer or sale of securities. A defrauded investor can sue for recovery under the 1933 Act.

== Rule 144 ==
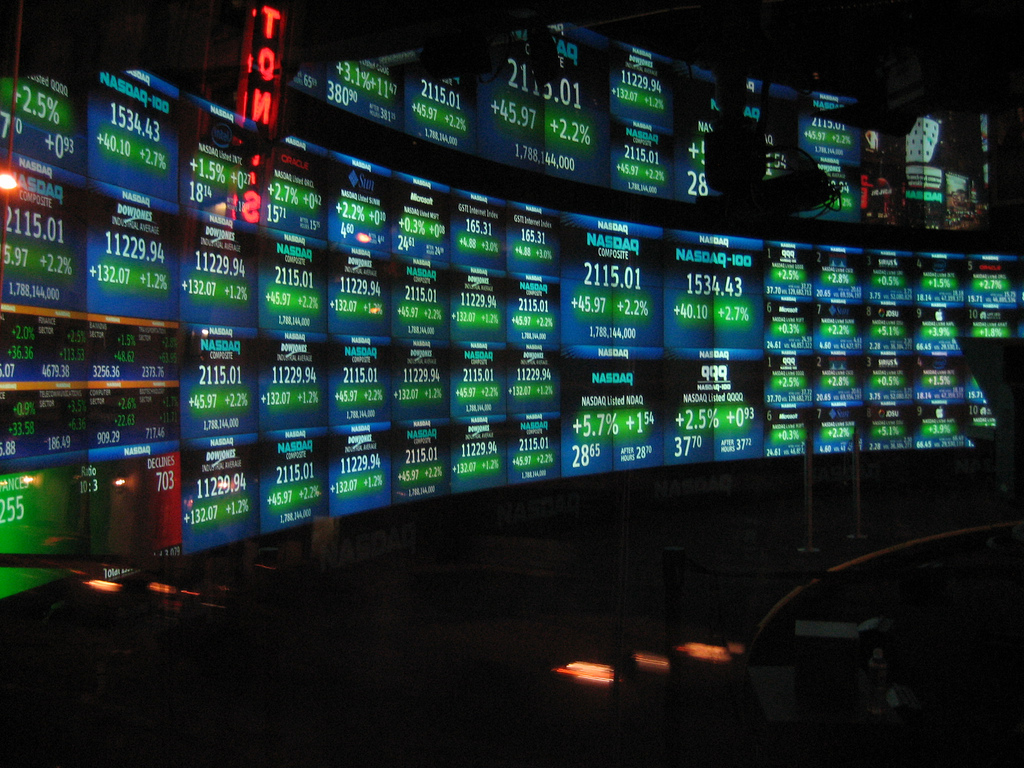
NASDAQ MarketSite TV studio

Rule 144, promulgated by the SEC under the 1933 Act, permits, under limited circumstances, the public resale of restricted and controlled securities without registration. In addition to restrictions on the minimum length of time for which such securities must be held and the maximum volume permitted to be sold, the issuer must agree to the sale. If certain requirements are met, Form 144 must be filed with the SEC. Often, the issuer requires that a legal opinion be given indicating that the resale complies with the rule. The amount of securities sold during any subsequent three-month period generally does not exceed any of the following limitations:

- 1% of the stock outstanding
- the average weekly reported volume of trading in the securities on all national securities exchanges for the preceding 4 weeks
- the average weekly volume of trading of the securities reported through the consolidated transactions reporting system (NASDAQ)

Notice of resale is provided to the SEC if the amount of securities sold in reliance on Rule 144 in any three-month period exceeds 5,000 shares or if they have an aggregate sales price in excess of $50,000. After one year, Rule 144(k) allows for the permanent removal of the restriction except as to 'insiders'. In cases of mergers, buyouts, or takeovers, owners of securities who had previously filed Form 144 and still wish to sell restricted and controlled securities must refile Form 144 once the merger, buyout, or takeover has been completed.

SIFMA, the Securities Industry and Financial Markets Association, issued "SIFMA Guidance: Procedures, Covenants, and Remedies in Light of Revised Rule 144" after revisions were made to Rule 144.

=== Rule 144A ===
Rule 144 is not to be confused with Rule 144A. Rule 144A, adopted in April 1990, provides a safe harbor from the registration requirements of the Securities Act of 1933 for certain private (as opposed to public) resales of restricted securities to qualified institutional buyers. Rule 144A has become the principal safe harbor on which non-U.S. companies rely when accessing the U.S. capital markets.

== Regulation S ==
Regulation S is a "safe harbor" that defines when an offering of securities is deemed to be executed in another country and therefore not be subject to the registration requirement under Section 5 of the 1933 Act. The regulation includes two safe harbor provisions: an issuer safe harbor and a resale safe harbor. In each case, the regulation demands that offers and sales of the securities be made outside the United States and that no offering participant (which includes the issuer, the banks assisting with the offer, and their respective affiliates) engage in "directed selling efforts". In the case of issuers for whose securities there is substantial U.S. market interest, the regulation also requires that no offers and sales be made to U.S. persons (including U.S. persons physically located outside the United States).

Section 5 of the 1933 Act is meant primarily as protection for United States investors. As such, the U.S. Securities and Exchange Commission had only weakly enforced regulation of foreign transactions, and had only limited Constitutional authority to regulate foreign transactions. This law applies to its own unique definition of United States person.

== Civil liability; Sections 11 and 12 ==
Violation of the registration requirements can lead to near-strict civil liability for the issuer, underwriters, directors, officers, and accountants under §§ 11, 12(a)(1), or 12(a)(2) of the 1933 Act. However, in practice the liability is typically covered by directors and officers liability insurance or indemnification clauses.

To have "standing" to sue under Section 11 of the 1933 Act, such as in a class action, a plaintiff must be able to prove that he can "trace" his shares to the registration statement in question, as to which there is an alleged material misstatement or omission. In the absence of the plaintiff having an ability to actually trace his shares to the allegedly defective registration statement, such as when securities issued at multiple times -- and not all under the same registration statement which contains the alleged defect -- are held together by the Depository Trust Company in its nominee name in a fungible bulk, the plaintiff may be barred from pursuing his claim for lack of standing.

Class action complaints involving federal Section 11 claims and state claims under the '33 Act rose 43% in 2022. Over a fifth of all core federal filings included Section 11 allegations.

Additional liability may be imposed under the Securities Exchange Act of 1934 (Rule 10b-5) against the "maker" of the alleged misrepresentation in certain circumstances.

== See also ==
- Chicago Stock Exchange
- Commodity Futures Trading Commission
- Financial regulation
- New York Stock Exchange
- Regulation D (SEC)
- Securities commission
- Securities regulation in the United States
- Stock exchange

Related legislation

- 1934 – Securities Exchange Act of 1934
- 1939 – Trust Indenture Act of 1939
- 1940 – Investment Advisers Act of 1940
- 1940 – Investment Company Act of 1940
- 1968 – Williams Act (Securities Disclosure Act) of 1968
- 1975 – Securities Acts Amendments of 1975
- 1982 – Garn–St. Germain Depository Institutions Act of 1982
- 1999 – Gramm-Leach-Bliley Act of 1999
- 2000 – Commodity Futures Modernization Act of 2000
- 2002 – Sarbanes–Oxley Act of 2002
- 2006 – Credit Rating Agency Reform Act of 2006
- 2010 – Dodd–Frank Wall Street Reform and Consumer Protection Act of 2010
