= List of members of the Securities and Exchange Commission =

Members of the U.S. Securities and Exchange Commission are appointed by the president of the United States. Their terms last five years and are staggered so that one commissioner's term ends on June 5 of each year. If an appointment is to fill out an uncompleted term, it will be for less than five years. To ensure that the commission remains non-partisan, no more than three commissioners may belong to the same political party. The president also designates one of the commissioners as chairman, the SEC's top executive. Service may continue past term expiration up to eighteen additional months. This page is sorted by president and date of appointment; a second list sorts the page by SEC member's employment with private firms.

== List of members ==
List of commissioners of the Securities and Exchange Commission (1934-present)
Term start	President	Chair	Republican		Democratic	
1934	Franklin D. Roosevelt	Joseph P. Kennedy Sr.	George C. Matthews	Robert E. Healy	James M. Landis	Ferdinand Pecora
1935	Franklin D. Roosevelt	James M. Landis	George C. Matthews	Robert E. Healy	William O. Douglas	James Delmage Ross
1936	Franklin D. Roosevelt	James M. Landis	George C. Matthews	Robert E. Healy	William O. Douglas	James Delmage Ross
1937	Franklin D. Roosevelt	James M. Landis	George C. Matthews	Robert E. Healy	William O. Douglas	Jerome Frank
1938	Franklin D. Roosevelt	William O. Douglas	George C. Matthews	Robert E. Healy	John W. Hanes	Jerome Frank
1939	Franklin D. Roosevelt	Jerome Frank	George C. Matthews	Robert E. Healy	Edward C. Eicher	Leon Henderson
1940	Franklin D. Roosevelt	Jerome Frank	Sumner T. Pike	Robert E. Healy	Edward C. Eicher	Leon Henderson
1941	Franklin D. Roosevelt	Edward C. Eicher	Sumner T. Pike	Robert E. Healy	Ganson Purcell	Edmund Burke Jr.
1942	Franklin D. Roosevelt	Ganson Purcell	Sumner T. Pike	Robert E. Healy	Robert H. O'Brien	Edmund Burke Jr.
1943	Franklin D. Roosevelt	Ganson Purcell	Sumner T. Pike	Robert E. Healy	Robert H. O'Brien	Robert K. McConnaughey
1944	Franklin D. Roosevelt	Ganson Purcell	Sumner T. Pike	Robert E. Healy	Robert H. O'Brien	Robert K. McConnaughey
1945	Harry S. Truman	Ganson Purcell	Sumner T. Pike	Robert E. Healy	James J. Caffrey	Robert K. McConnaughey
1946	Harry S. Truman	James J. Caffrey	Richard B. McEntire	Harry A. McDonald		Robert K. McConnaughey
1947	Harry S. Truman	James J. Caffrey	Richard B. McEntire	Harry A. McDonald		Robert K. McConnaughey
1948	Harry S. Truman	Edmond M. Hanrahan	Richard B. McEntire	Harry A. McDonald	Paul R. Rowen	Robert K. McConnaughey
1949	Harry S. Truman	Harry A. McDonald	Richard B. McEntire		Paul R. Rowen	Donald C. Cook
1950	Harry S. Truman	Harry A. McDonald	Richard B. McEntire		Paul R. Rowen	Donald C. Cook
1951	Harry S. Truman	Harry A. McDonald	Richard B. McEntire		Paul R. Rowen	Donald C. Cook
1951	Harry S. Truman	Donald C. Cook	Richard B. McEntire		Paul R. Rowen	Donald C. Cook
1951	Harry S. Truman	Donald C. Cook	Richard B. McEntire		Paul R. Rowen	Robert I. Millonzi
1952	Harry S. Truman	Donald C. Cook	Richard B. McEntire	Clarence H. Adams	Paul R. Rowen	J. Howard Rossbach
1953	Dwight D. Eisenhower	Ralph H. Demmler		Clarence H. Adams	Paul R. Rowen	A. J. Goodwin Jr.
1954	Dwight D. Eisenhower	Ralph H. Demmler		Clarence H. Adams	Paul R. Rowen	A. J. Goodwin Jr.
1955	Dwight D. Eisenhower	J. Sinclair Armstrong	Andrew Downey Orrick	Clarence H. Adams	Harold C. Patterson	
1956	Dwight D. Eisenhower	J. Sinclair Armstrong	Andrew Downey Orrick	James C. Sargent	Harold C. Patterson	Earl F. Hastings
1957	Dwight D. Eisenhower	Edward N. Gadsby	Andrew Downey Orrick	James C. Sargent	Harold C. Patterson	Earl F. Hastings
1958	Dwight D. Eisenhower	Edward N. Gadsby	Andrew Downey Orrick	James C. Sargent	Harold C. Patterson	Earl F. Hastings
1959	Dwight D. Eisenhower	Edward N. Gadsby	Andrew Downey Orrick	James C. Sargent	Harold C. Patterson	Earl F. Hastings
1960	Dwight D. Eisenhower	Edward N. Gadsby	Daniel J. McCauley	Byron D. Woodside		Earl F. Hastings
1961	John F. Kennedy	William L. Cary	Jack M. Whitney II	Byron D. Woodside	J. Allen Frear Jr.	Manuel F. Cohen
1962	John F. Kennedy	William L. Cary	Jack M. Whitney II	Byron D. Woodside	J. Allen Frear Jr.	Manuel F. Cohen
1963	John F. Kennedy	William L. Cary	Jack M. Whitney II	Byron D. Woodside		Manuel F. Cohen
1964	Lyndon B. Johnson	Manuel F. Cohen	Hamer H. Budge	Byron D. Woodside	Hugh F. Owens	Francis M. Wheat
1965	Lyndon B. Johnson	Manuel F. Cohen	Hamer H. Budge	Byron D. Woodside	Hugh F. Owens	Francis M. Wheat
1966	Lyndon B. Johnson	Manuel F. Cohen	Hamer H. Budge	Byron D. Woodside	Hugh F. Owens	Francis M. Wheat
1967	Lyndon B. Johnson	Manuel F. Cohen	Hamer H. Budge	Richard B. Smith	Hugh F. Owens	Francis M. Wheat
1968	Lyndon B. Johnson	Manuel F. Cohen	Hamer H. Budge	Richard B. Smith	Hugh F. Owens	Francis M. Wheat
1968	Lyndon B. Johnson	Hamer H. Budge		Richard B. Smith	Hugh F. Owens	Francis M. Wheat
1969	Richard M. Nixon	Hamer H. Budge	James J. Needham	Richard B. Smith	Hugh F. Owens	Syd Herlong
1970	Richard M. Nixon	Hamer H. Budge	James J. Needham	Richard B. Smith	Hugh F. Owens	Syd Herlong
1971	Richard M. Nixon	William J. Casey	James J. Needham	Philip A. Loomis Jr.	Hugh F. Owens	Syd Herlong
1972	Richard M. Nixon	William J. Casey		Philip A. Loomis Jr.	Hugh F. Owens	Syd Herlong
1973	Richard M. Nixon	G. Bradford Cook	John R. Evans	Philip A. Loomis Jr.		A. A. Sommer Jr.
1973	Richard M. Nixon	Ray Garrett Jr.	John R. Evans	Philip A. Loomis Jr.	Irving M. Pollack	A. A. Sommer Jr.
1974	Richard M. Nixon	Ray Garrett Jr.	John R. Evans	Philip A. Loomis Jr.	Irving M. Pollack	A. A. Sommer Jr.
1975	Gerald R. Ford	Roderick M. Hills	John R. Evans	Philip A. Loomis Jr.	Irving M. Pollack	A. A. Sommer Jr.
1976	Gerald R. Ford	Roderick M. Hills	John R. Evans	Philip A. Loomis Jr.	Irving M. Pollack	Vacant
1977	Jimmy Carter	Harold M. Williams	John R. Evans	Philip A. Loomis Jr.	Irving M. Pollack	Roberta Karmel
1978	Jimmy Carter	Harold M. Williams	John R. Evans	Philip A. Loomis Jr.	Irving M. Pollack	Roberta Karmel
1979	Jimmy Carter	Harold M. Williams	John R. Evans	Philip A. Loomis Jr.	Irving M. Pollack	Roberta Karmel
1980	Jimmy Carter	Harold M. Williams	John R. Evans	Philip A. Loomis Jr.	Stephen J. Friedman	Barbara Judge
1981	Ronald Reagan	John S. R. Shad	John R. Evans	Philip A. Loomis Jr.	Bevis Longstreth	Barbara Judge
1982	Ronald Reagan	John S. R. Shad	John R. Evans	James C. Treadway Jr.	Bevis Longstreth	Barbara Judge
1983	Ronald Reagan	John S. R. Shad	Charles Chapman Cox	James C. Treadway Jr.	Bevis Longstreth	Charles L. Marinaccio
1984	Ronald Reagan	John S. R. Shad	Charles Chapman Cox	James C. Treadway Jr.	Aulana L. Peters	
1985	Ronald Reagan	John S. R. Shad	Charles Chapman Cox		Aulana L. Peters	Charles L. Marinaccio
1986	Ronald Reagan	John S. R. Shad	Charles Chapman Cox	Edward H . Flesichman	Aulana L. Peters	Charles L. Marinaccio
1987	Ronald Reagan	David S. Ruder	Charles Chapman Cox	Edward H . Flesichman	Aulana L. Peters	Charles L. Marinaccio
1988	Ronald Reagan	David S. Ruder	Charles Chapman Cox	Edward H . Flesichman	Mary Shapiro	Charles L. Marinaccio
1989	George H. W. Bush	Richard C. Breeden	Charles Chapman Cox	Edward H . Flesichman	Mary Shapiro	Charles L. Marinaccio
1990	George H. W. Bush	Richard C. Breeden	Philip R. Lochner Jr.	Edward H . Flesichman	Mary Shapiro	Richard Y. Roberts
1991	George H. W. Bush	Richard C. Breeden	Vacant	Edward H . Flesichman	Mary Shapiro	Richard Y. Roberts
1992	George H. W. Bush	Richard C. Breeden	Vacant	J. Carter Beese Jr.	Mary Shapiro	Richard Y. Roberts
1993	Bill Clinton	Arthur Levitt	Vacant	J. Carter Beese Jr.	Mary Shapiro	Richard Y. Roberts
1994	Bill Clinton	Arthur Levitt	Vacant	J. Carter Beese Jr.	Mary Shapiro	Richard Y. Roberts
1995	Bill Clinton	Arthur Levitt	Vacant	J. Carter Beese Jr.	Steven Wallman	Vacant
1996	Bill Clinton	Arthur Levitt	Norman S. Johnson	J. Carter Beese Jr.	Steven Wallman	Isaac C. Hunt Jr.
1997	Bill Clinton	Arthur Levitt	Norman S. Johnson	Laura Unger	Paul R. Carey	Isaac C. Hunt Jr.
1998	Bill Clinton	Arthur Levitt	Norman S. Johnson	Laura Unger	Paul R. Carey	Isaac C. Hunt Jr.
1999	Bill Clinton	Arthur Levitt	Norman S. Johnson	Laura Unger	Paul R. Carey	Isaac C. Hunt Jr.
2000	Bill Clinton	Arthur Levitt	Norman S. Johnson	Laura Unger	Paul R. Carey	Isaac C. Hunt Jr.
2001	George W. Bush	Harvey Pitt	Vacant	Laura Unger	Vacant	Isaac C. Hunt Jr.
2002	George W. Bush	Harvey Pitt	Cynthia Glassman	Paul S. Atkins	Harvey Goldschmid	Roel Campos
2003	George W. Bush	William H. Donaldson	Cynthia Glassman	Paul S. Atkins	Harvey Goldschmid	Roel Campos
2004	George W. Bush	William H. Donaldson	Cynthia Glassman	Paul S. Atkins	Harvey Goldschmid	Roel Campos
2005	George W. Bush	Christopher Cox	Cynthia Glassman	Paul S. Atkins	Harvey Goldschmid	Roel Campos
2006	George W. Bush	Christopher Cox	Kathleen L. Casey	Paul S. Atkins	Annette Nazareth	Roel Campos
2007	George W. Bush	Christopher Cox	Kathleen L. Casey	Paul S. Atkins	Annette Nazareth	Roel Campos
2008	George W. Bush	Christopher Cox	Kathleen L. Casey	Troy Paredes	Elisse B. Walter	Luis A. Aguilar
2009	Barack Obama	Mary Shapiro	Kathleen L. Casey	Troy Paredes	Elisse B. Walter	Luis A. Aguilar
2010	Barack Obama	Mary Shapiro	Kathleen L. Casey	Troy Paredes	Elisse B. Walter	Luis A. Aguilar
2011	Barack Obama	Mary Shapiro	Daniel M. Gallagher	Troy Paredes	Elisse B. Walter	Luis A. Aguilar
2012	Barack Obama	Mary Shapiro	Daniel M. Gallagher	Troy Paredes	Elisse B. Walter	Luis A. Aguilar
2013	Barack Obama	Mary Jo White	Daniel M. Gallagher	Michael Piwowar	Kara Stein	Luis A. Aguilar
2014	Barack Obama	Mary Jo White	Daniel M. Gallagher	Michael Piwowar	Kara Stein	Luis A. Aguilar
2015	Barack Obama	Mary Jo White	Vacant	Michael Piwowar	Kara Stein	Vacant
2016	Barack Obama	Mary Jo White	Vacant	Michael Piwowar	Kara Stein	Vacant
2017	Donald Trump	Jay Clayton	Vacant	Michael Piwowar	Kara Stein	Vacant
2018	Donald Trump	Jay Clayton	Hester Peirce	Elad Roisman	Kara Stein	Robert J. Jackson Jr.
2019	Donald Trump	Jay Clayton	Hester Peirce	Elad Roisman	Allison Lee	Robert J. Jackson Jr.
2020	Donald Trump	Jay Clayton	Hester Peirce	Elad Roisman	Allison Lee	Caroline A. Crenshaw
2021	Joe Biden	Gary Gensler	Hester Peirce	Elad Roisman	Allison Lee	Caroline A. Crenshaw
2022	Joe Biden	Gary Gensler	Hester Peirce	Mark Uyeda	Jaime Lizárraga	Caroline A. Crenshaw
2023	Joe Biden	Gary Gensler	Hester Peirce	Mark Uyeda	Jaime Lizárraga	Caroline A. Crenshaw
2024	Joe Biden	Gary Gensler	Hester Peirce	Mark Uyeda	Jaime Lizárraga	Caroline A. Crenshaw
2025	Donald Trump	Paul Atkins	Hester Peirce	Mark Uyeda	Vacant	Vacant
