= Robert K. McConnaughey =

American lawyer (1905 – 1966)

Commissioner of the United States Securities and Exchange Commission
- In office 1943–1948
- Nominated by: Franklin D. Roosevelt; Harry S. Truman
- Preceded by: Edmund Burke, Jr.
- Succeeded by: Donald C. Cook

Personal details
- Born: Dayton, Ohio, U.S.
- Died: February 28, 1966
- Party: Democratic
- Education: Dartmouth College (BS); Harvard Law School (JD)
- Occupation: Lawyer

Robert K. McConnaughey (1905 - 1966) was an American business lawyer. He served as Securities and Exchange Commissioner between 1941 and 1943. After leaving the SEC, he was a trial commissioner for the United States Court of Claims.
