= A.A. Sommer, Jr. =

American lawyer (1924 – 2002)

Alphonse Adam "Al" Sommer Jr.

Commissioner of the United States Securities and Exchange Commission
- In office 1973–1976
- Nominated by: Richard Nixon
- Preceded by: Syd Herlong
- Succeeded by: Roberta Karmel

Personal details
- Born: April 7, 1924 Portsmouth, Ohio, U.S.
- Died: April 26, 2002 (aged 78)
- Party: Democratic
- Education: University of Notre Dame (BS); Harvard Law School (JD)
- Occupation: Lawyer

Alphonse Adam "Al" Sommer Jr. (1924 - 2002) was an American business lawyer. He served as Securities and Exchange Commissioner between 1973 and 1976. After leaving the SEC, he worked for the American Institute of Certified Public Accountants.
