= Demmler =

Demmler is a surname. Notable people with the surname include:

- Georg Adolph Demmler (1804–1886), German architect and politician
- Kurt Demmler (1943–2009), German songwriter, accused of sexual abuse he hanged himself in his Berlin jail cell.
- Ralph H. Demmler (1904–1995), American lawyer
- Steven E. Demmler Sr. (1952-), Chief Props at Saturday Night Live for 47 seasons.
- Steven E. Demmler Jr. (1985-), Founder of Talon Entertainment Finance a film equity and debt investment vehicle and private equity firm that owns and operates soundstages around the world.
