= Edmund Burke, Jr. =

American lawyer (1905 – 1993)

Commissioner of the United States Securities and Exchange Commission
- In office 1941–1943
- Nominated by: Franklin D. Roosevelt
- Preceded by: Leon Henderson
- Succeeded by: Robert K. McConnaughey

Personal details
- Born: 1905 New York, New York, U.S.
- Died: 1993 (aged 87–88) Buffalo, New York
- Party: Democratic
- Education: Princeton University (BS); Harvard Law School (JD)
- Occupation: Lawyer

Edmund Burke, Jr. (1905 - 1993) was an American business lawyer. He served as Securities and Exchange Commissioner between 1941 and 1943. Prior to working at the SEC, he was a lawyer for the Public Works Administration.
