= James Reed Building =

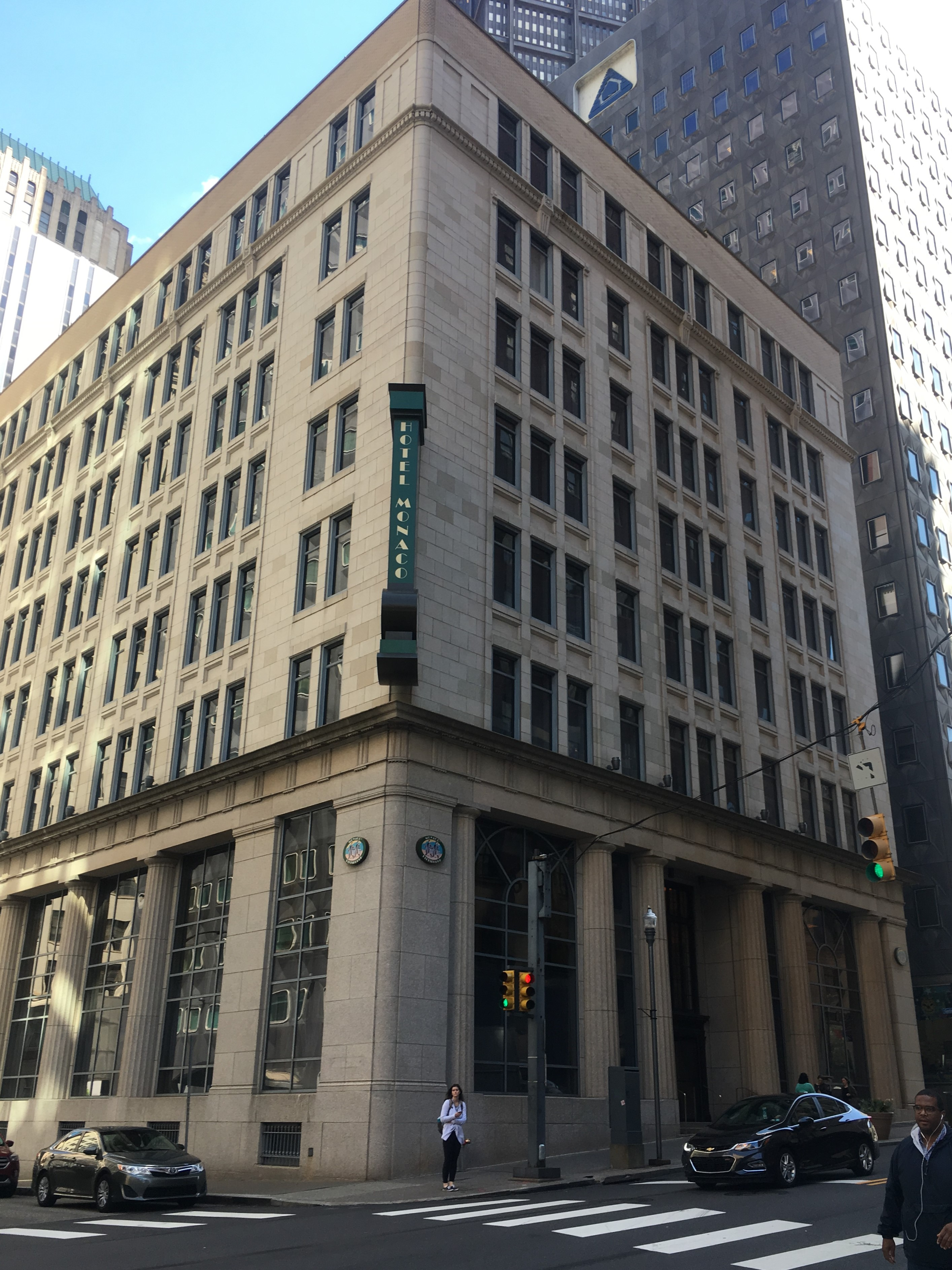
- James Reed Building on 6th Avenue in Pittsburgh, Pennsylvania
- Interactive map of the James Reed Building area

General information
- Type: Hotel
- Location: 435 Sixth Avenue, Pittsburgh, Pennsylvania
- Coordinates: 40°26′28.8″N 79°59′46.6″W
- Completed: 1902
- Owner: PMC Property Group

Height
- Roof: 106 ft (32 m)

Technical details
- Floor count: 9
- Floor area: 181,348 sq ft (16,847.8 m^{2})

The James Reed Building or the Reed Smith Building is a historic building in Pittsburgh, Pennsylvania. Built in 1902, it was designed in the Beaux-Arts architecture style.

== Architectural design and history ==
This building was named after James H. Reed, an American judge and founder of the Reed Smith law firm, which was the building's primary tenant for many years.

Reed Smith bought the nine-story building in 1984 for $5.82 million as 435 Sixth Ave Associates. In 2007 Reed Smith decided to relocate its corporate headquarters to Three PNC Plaza and sell the building, which had a market value of $16.78 million. The downtown Pittsburgh office vacancy rate at the time was 20%, driving down the value of the building. In October 2008, the building was purchased by Mika Realty Group of Los Angeles for $6.5 million. Mika Realty, owned by Michael Kamen and Gerson Fox, purchased the building under the name 600 William Penn Partners LLC. Kamen and Fox also purchased the nearby Union Trust Building 6 months prior.

In 2009, Reed Smith law firm moved its corporate headquarters to Three PNC Plaza. Mika Realty was never able to find a tenant to replace Reed Smith, the building remained vacant, which led to bankruptcy in 2011. PMC Property Group purchased the building in September 2012 for $5.5 million in a U.S. Bankruptcy Court auction in Los Angeles.

The building was redeveloped into a 249-room Hotel Monaco, opened in January 2015.
