= Bevis Longstreth =

American author and lawyer (1934–2026)

Member of the Securities and Exchange Commission
- In office 1981–1983
- President: Ronald Reagan

Personal details
- Born: January 29, 1934 New Jersey, U.S.
- Died: May 2, 2026 (aged 92) Putnam County, New York, U.S.
- Party: Republican
- Spouse: Clare St. John (m. 1963–2026)
- Children: 3
- Education: Princeton University (BS); Harvard University (LLB)

Military service
- Branch/service: United States Marine Corps
- Years of service: 1956–1958
- Rank: First Lieutenant

Bevis Longstreth Jr. (January 29, 1934 – May 2, 2026) was an American lawyer and former commissioner of the United States Securities and Exchange Commission. He practiced law as a partner at Debevoise & Plimpton and taught on the faculty of Columbia Law School.

== Early life and education ==
Longstreth was born in 1934 in New Jersey, as one of five children to Mary and Bevis Longstreth Sr. Bevis Longstreth, Sr. was an industrialist who founded Thiokol and served as the company's president from 1929 to his death in 1944.

Longstreth graduated from the Hill School in 1956 and served as a first lieutenant in the United States Marine Corps from 1956 to 1958. Longstreth earned a bachelor's degree in engineering from Princeton University and a Bachelor of Laws from Harvard Law School.

== Career ==
Longstreth was a partner at Debevoise & Plimpton before being made a member of the SEC from 1981 to 1984. Longstreth returned to Debevoise & Plimpton after leaving the SEC, working there for another ten years.

In 1994, Longstreth became an adjunct professor at Columbia Law School, teaching the regulation of financial institutions. He was also a frequent speaker and lecturer on various securities and corporate law topics. He served on various boards throughout his career, including the American Stock Exchange, the Council on Foreign Relations, Symphony Space, The New School, and the Highlands Current newspaper.. He has served in executive roles for Invesco, TIAA, and GMO LLC. He served on the Pension Finance Committee of the World Bank Group.

Longstreth has also written five books. He wrote the economics book Modern Investment Management and the Prudent Man Rule (1986) during his career and four works of historical fiction since retiring as a lawyer: Spindle and Bow (2005), Return of the Shade (2009), Boats Against the Current (2016) and Chains Across the River (2021).

== Personal life and death ==
Longstreth married Clara St. John in 1963, with whom he had three children. As of 2015, the couple had nine grandchildren. A longtime resident of Putnam County, New York, Longstreth died on May 2, 2026, at the age of 92.
