= J. Sinclair Armstrong =

American banker and governmental official

J. Sinclair Armstrong CBE
- Armstrong as Assistant Secretary of the Navy

Assistant Secretary of the Navy
- In office May 28, 1957 – January 2, 1959
- President: Dwight D. Eisenhower
- Preceded by: William B. Franke
- Succeeded by: Victor M. Longstreet

Chairman of the U.S. Securities and Exchange Commission
- In office 1955–1957
- President: Dwight D. Eisenhower
- Preceded by: Ralph H. Demmler
- Succeeded by: Edward N. Gadsby

Personal details
- Born: James Sinclair Armstrong; October 15, 1915 Manhattan, New York, U.S.
- Died: November 5, 2000 (aged 85) Manhattan, New York, U.S.
- Party: Republican
- Spouses: Elisabeth Stillman (m. 1940, divorced) Joan Shepard Miller (m. 1960, divorced) Joan Estelle Carroll Evans (m. 1973, divorced) Charlotte P. Horwood Faircloth (after 1973)
- Education: Milton Academy; Northwestern University
- Alma mater: Harvard College; Harvard Law School

James Sinclair Armstrong II CBE (October 15, 1915 – November 5, 2000) was an American banker and lawyer who served as chairman of the U.S. Securities and Exchange Commission between 1955 and 1957 and also served as a member from 1957 to 1961. He was Assistant Secretary of the Navy (Financial Management and Comptroller) from 1957 to 1959.

== Early life ==
Armstrong was born in Manhattan on October 15, 1915, and was christened at St. Bartholomew's Episcopal Church in 1916. He was a son of lawyer Sinclair Howard Armstrong (1881–1980) and nutritionist Katharine Martin (née LeBoutillier) Armstrong (1886–1977). His brother was Dr. S. Howard Armstrong Jr. The family spent summers at his mother's farm in Washington, Connecticut and his father's camp on Chappaquiddick Island in Edgartown on Martha's Vineyard

His maternal grandparents were Sarah Graydon (née Martin) LeBoutillier and Charles LeBoutillier of 136 East 36th Street, was a partner in LeBoutillier Brothers, a family business that was one of the first retail chain stores in America. His paternal grandparents were James Sinclair Armstrong and Lizzie Howard (née Welsh) Armstrong.

He graduated from Milton Academy in 1934, followed by Harvard College, where he served as editorial chairman of The Harvard Crimson and was a member of the Hasty Pudding Club and the Fox Club, before attending Harvard Law School.

== Career ==
After his graduation from law school, he passed the New York State bar exam in June 1941 before being admitted to the Illinois bar in November 1941. He joined Isham Lincoln & Beale, a law firm in Chicago that was founded by Edward Swift Isham and Robert Todd Lincoln (son of President Abraham Lincoln). Armstrong was later made a partner in the firm, where he specialized in corporate securities. From 1942 to 1944, and again from 1946 to 1948, he studied accounting at Northwestern University.

=== Public service ===
From 1945 to 1946, he served in the Office of the General Counsel of the Navy in Washington, D.C. Between 1945 and 1946, he was on active duty with the U.S. Naval Reserve.

In 1953, President Dwight D. Eisenhower named him to the Securities and Exchange Commission, and from 1955 to 1957, he was chairman of the agency. While chairman, he was known for his work towards tougher rules the selling of stocks and bonds and for advertising. In February 1961, Armstrong wrote an editorial to The New York Times praising President Kennedy's appointment of William L. Cary as chairman of the agency and former U.S. Senator J. Allen Frear Jr. to the commission.

In 1957, Eisenhower appointed him Assistant Secretary of the Navy and Comptroller of the Navy Department to succeed William B. Franke (who became Under Secretary of the Navy). While Assistant Secretary, he is known for his efforts to establish controls to rein in costs while the Navy was adapting to nuclear power, missiles, and rockets.

=== Later career ===
On January 2, 1959, Armstrong left public office to become executive vice president of The United States Trust Company in New York, where he handled the banking for securities and law firms. He later became associated with the law firm of Whitman, Breed, Abbott & Morgan, where he was involved in securities and banking and historic preservation law, which he was particularly passionate about. From 1970 to 1971, he served as the 77th president of the Saint Andrew's Society of the State of New York.

== Personal life ==
Armstrong was married four times, with his first three ending in divorce. On June 30, 1940, he was married to debutante Elisabeth Stillman (c. 1915–1973) at Christ Protestant Episcopal Church in Watertown, Connecticut. Elisabeth was the daughter of the former Katherine Chase and Dr. Edgar Stillman, whose summer home in Watertown, known as Highfield, hosted the wedding reception. Together, they were the parents of two girls and three boys, including:

- Katherine Chase Armstrong, who resided in Bronxville, New York in 2000.
- Elisabeth Stillman Armstrong, who married Jon M. Bushey and resided in Deerfield, Massachusetts in 2000.
- James Sinclair Armstrong III, who resided in Denver, Colorado in 2000.
- Stephen Howard Armstrong, who resided in Hadley, Massachusetts in 2000.
- Robert Stillman Armstrong, who resided in Vienna, Virginia in 2000.

On November 12, 1960, he was married for the second time to fellow divorcée Joan Shepard (née Miller) Gilchrist. Joan, a daughter of J. Bernard Miller of Manhattan House and Washington, Connecticut, was a graduate of Chatham Hall in Virginia and Smith College.

On May 12, 1973, he was married to Radcliffe and Bryn Mawr College graduate Joan Estelle (née Carroll) Evans in Milton, Massachusetts. Joan, the widow of banker Dwight D. Evans, was a daughter of Dr. Henry G. Carroll, a surgeon.

On November 22, 1978, he married for the fourth time to Charlotte P. (née Horwood) Faircloth in New York City. Charlotte, a daughter of Dr. Murray P. Horwood (a Massachusetts Institute of Technology professor), was also a Harvard Law graduate who practiced with Cravath, Swaine & Moore before serving in the tax division of the Department of Justice.

Armstrong died in New York City on November 5, 2000.

Government offices
Preceded by William B. Franke	Assistant Secretary of the Navy (Financial Management and Comptroller); May 28, 1957 – January 2, 1959	Succeeded by Victor M. Longstreet
Preceded by Ralph H. Demmler	Chairmen of the United States Securities and Exchange Commission; 1955 – 1957	Succeeded by Edward N. Gadsby
