= Reed Smith =

International Law Firm

Reed Smith LLP
- No. of offices: 31
- No. of attorneys: 1,600
- Major practice areas: Mergers and Acquisitions, Private Equity, Finance, Life Sciences & Health, Energy & Natural Resources, Entertainment & Media, Shipping & Transportation
- Revenue: ▲$1.5 billion (2024)
- Profit per equity partner: ▲$1.8 million (2024)
- Date founded: 1877 (Pittsburgh); 1842 (Townsend Elliott & Munson in Philadelphia)
- Founders: Philander Knox and James Hay Reed in Pittsburgh and Joseph B. Townsend in Philadelphia, Pennsylvania
- Company type: Limited liability partnership
- Website: reedsmith.com

Reed Smith LLP is a global law firm with more than 1,500 lawyers in 30 offices throughout the United States, Europe, the Middle East and Asia.

== History ==
Reed Smith was founded in Pittsburgh in 1877 by Philander C. Knox and James H. Reed. The two partners created a relationship with American industrial tycoon, Andrew Carnegie, and the firm grew with Carnegie's business. Large businesses, such as Heinz (company), and personalities – many of whom, like Carnegie, Knox and Reed, were fellow members of the South Fork Fishing and Hunting Club – joined the firm's client roster, including Andrew Mellon (now The Bank of New York Mellon) and Henry Clay Frick.

During the 1880s, Edwin W. Smith and other partners joined the firm and, in 1922, the firm adopted the name Reed Smith Shaw & McClay. During the New Deal era, Reed Smith established a securities practice, and partner Ralph H. Demmler became chair of the Securities and Exchange Commission.

Despite a clear history of refusing repair work to the South Fork Dam, which had been advocated by, most especially, general manager of the Cambria Iron Company and member of the 40th United States Congress and of the 41st United States Congress, Daniel Johnson Morrell, who had become a member for the express purpose of monitoring the dam's condition; club members Knox and Reed were able to fend off four lawsuits seeking responsibility for the Johnstown Flood of 1889 against the South Fork Fishing and Hunting Club, stewards of the dam, Colonel Unger, its president, and against 50 named members. Each case was "either settled or discontinued and, as far as is known, no one bringing action profited thereby." The club was never held legally responsible for the disaster. Knox and Reed successfully argued that the dam's failure was a natural disaster which was an Act of God, and no legal compensation was paid to the survivors of the flood. The perceived injustice aided the acceptance of "strict, joint, and several liability," so that a "non-negligent defendant could be held liable for damage caused by the unnatural use of land.

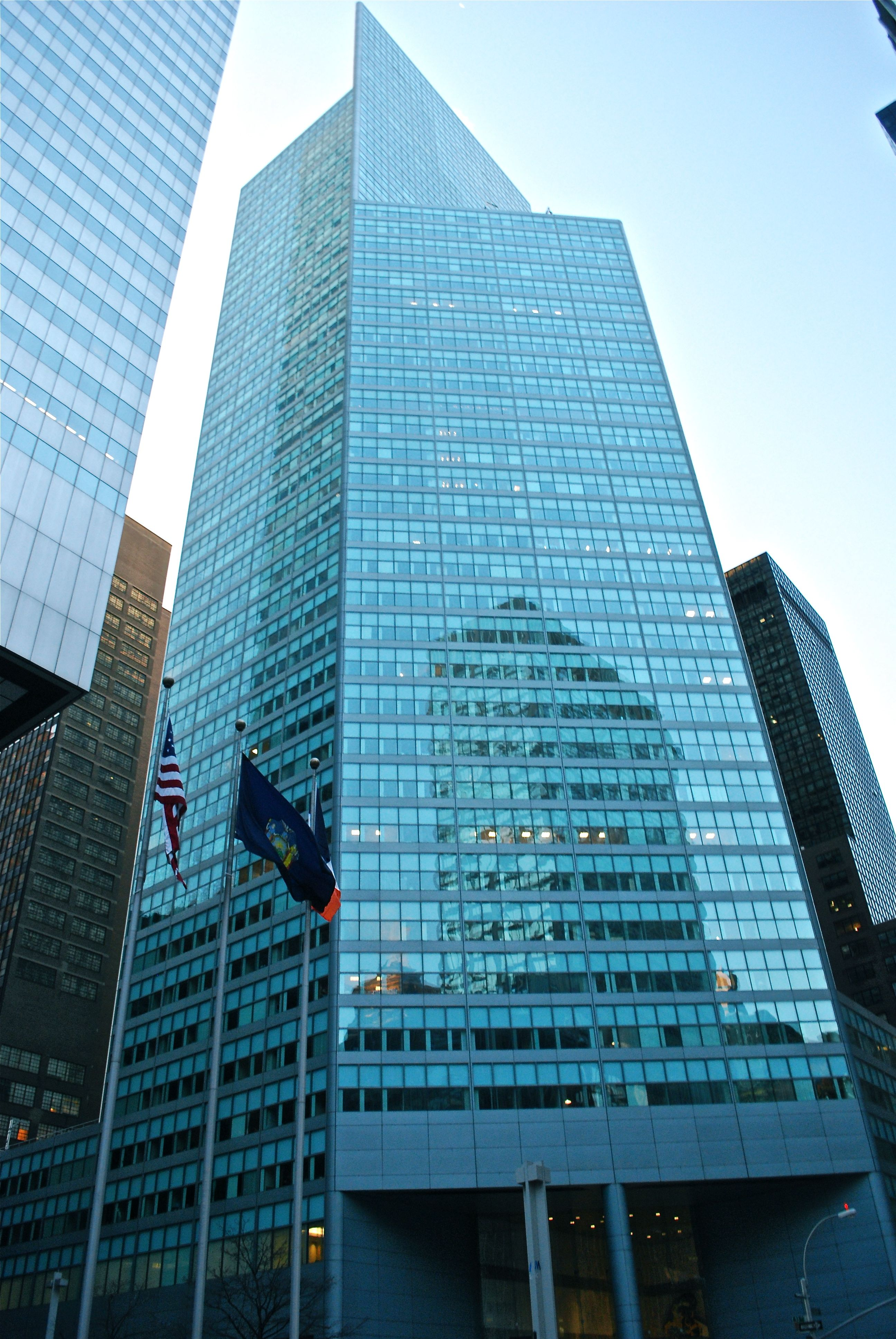
Reed Smith's New York offices at 599 Lexington Avenue

From 1970 to the present, the firm engaged in a series of mergers and acquisitions to create one of the largest law firms in the world.

In the 1970s, Reed Smith set up office in Washington, DC. In 1978, Reed Smith merged with Philadelphia law firm, Townsend Elliott & Munson (which was founded in 1842 by prominent Philadelphia citizen, Joseph B. Townsend whose pro bono accomplishments included being Chancellor of the Philadelphia Bar Association, chairman of the board of Jefferson Medical College, and a Board Manager of Pennsylvania Hospital - see his papers in archives of University of Delaware).

In 1989, the firm merged with Washington firm Pierson, Ball & Dowd, thereby obtaining a health care practice.

Reed Smith opened new offices in New York and New Jersey in the 1990s and acquired a Northern Virginia firm, Hazel & Thomas.

During the 2000s Reed Smith experienced rapid international growth. Acquiring the UK law firm Warner Cranston turned Reed Smith transatlantic in 2001 and it opened offices in Paris and Munich four years later. It opened an office in Delaware and combined with a California law firm, Crosby, Heafey, Roach & May, which moved the firm to among the 20 largest law firms in the US. In 2007 Reed Smith merged with UK law firm, Richards Butler, which added offices in France, Greece, the Middle East and Hong Kong. According to market analyst Adviser Rankings the total market capitalization of Reed Smith's stock market clients in the United Kingdom is the third highest of all US-law firms.

The firm counsels 13 of the world's 15 largest commercial and savings banks; 25 of the world's 35 largest oil and gas companies; and the world's three largest pharmaceutical distribution and wholesale companies.

Reed Smith opened their second German office in 2015 in Frankfurt, Germany's financial center, to meet growing client demand in the German market.

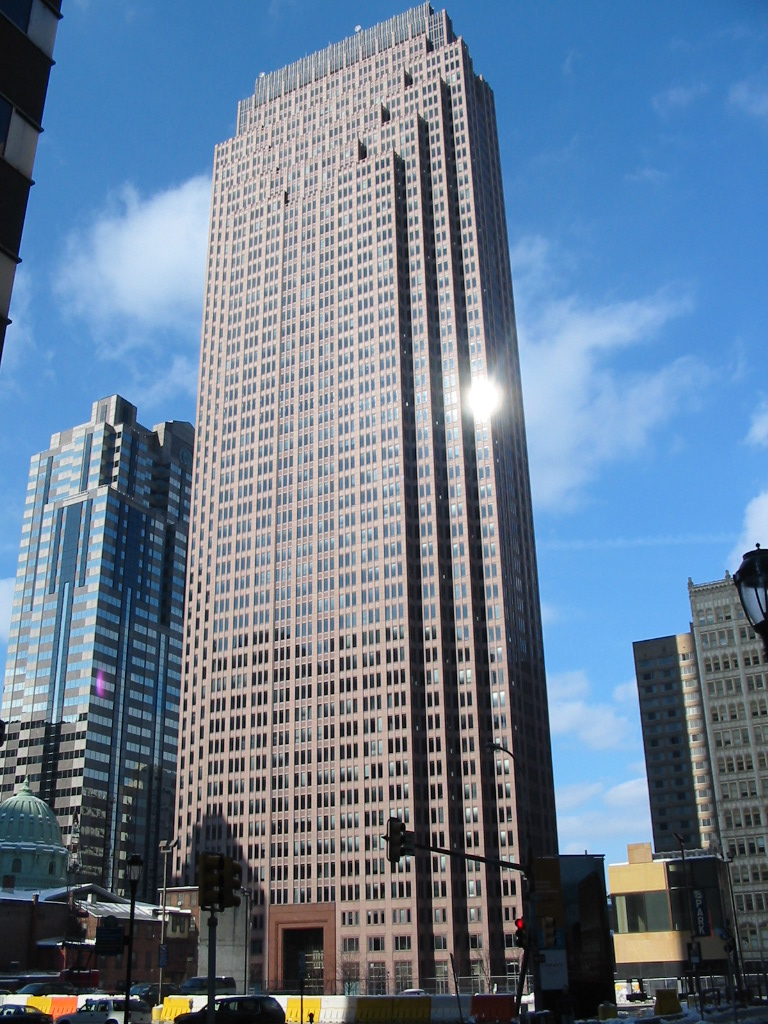
Reed Smith's offices at Three Logan Square in Philadelphia

In 2016, Reed Smith entered into a formal alliance with Singapore firm Resource Law. A year later the firm opened a new office in Miami.

On April 30, 2018, Reed Smith hired Lewis Zirogiannis (General Electric's former chief compliance officer) as a partner for its global regulatory enforcement practice in San Francisco. In 2018, Reed Smith hired 14 lawyers from competitor Norton Rose Fulbright and added a new office in Austin, Texas. In January 2020, the firm hired technology, M&A and private equity lawyer Craig Lilly. Lilly previously led Greenberg Traurig's Silicon Valley corporate practice group.

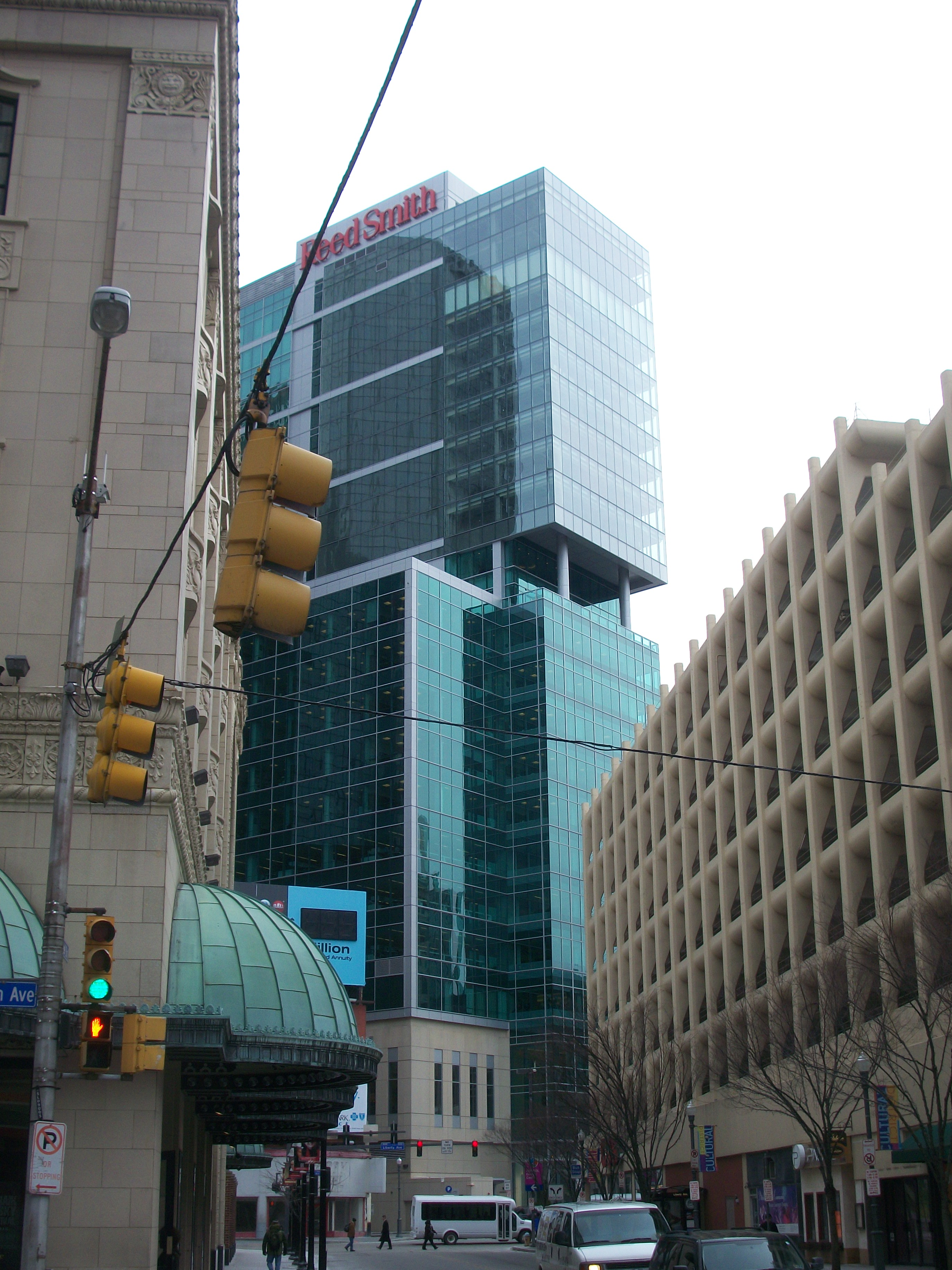
Reed Smith's Pittsburgh offices in the Three PNC Plaza building

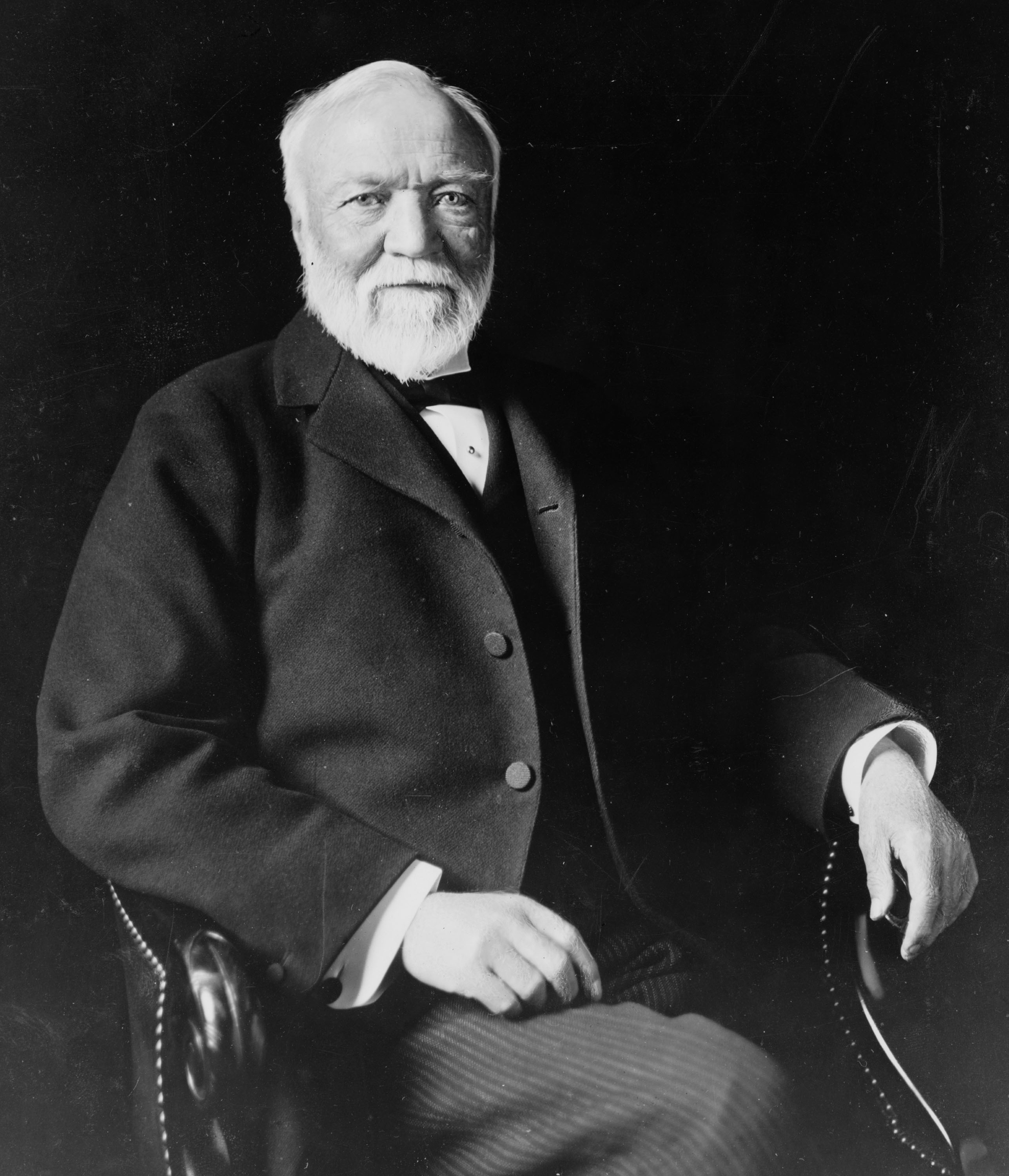
Business magnate and one of the firm's first clients Andrew Carnegie

== Recognition ==
According to Chambers USA, the firm services clients in matters of bankruptcy, insurance, finance, M&A, labor and employment, and more general litigation, across various industries, including entertainment and media, life sciences, shipping and finance, and has been awarded 43 Chambers USA rankings. Chambers UK awards Reed Smith top rankings for shipping, media and entertainment, commodities, and insurance work, and the firm is also ranked in London for its corporate M&A practice and a score of other areas. It is also rated highly for its shipping litigation and climate change work by Chambers Global.

- Reed Smith retained its position as one of the world's 20 strongest law firm brands in the 2018 Acritas Global Elite Law Firm Brand Index.
- Legal media outlet "The American Lawyer" awarded Reed Smith with its top Pro Bono Award in 2018.
- Reed Smith was named to BTI Global Elite in 2018, a list of 28 law firms with the biggest imprint on corporate counsel key brand activities influencing hiring and selection.
- The firm won the i-law Maritime Law Award at the Lloyd's List Global Awards, an authority on maritime news since 1734. The award highlights excellence and leadership in the shipping and maritime industry. In addition, the head of Reed Smith's global Shipping Group has also been recognised as Lloyd's List's top maritime lawyer of 2018.
- Reed Smith was ranked 5th in the Vault Best Law Firms in the Mid-Atlantic ranking.
- In 2018, the firm has been ranked 25th in the AmLaw 100, a list analyzing the financial health of the 100 largest law firms in the US by gross revenue and other key metrics.
- Reed Smith has been ranked a Top-tier Firm in Legal 500 German 2018 Rankings in seven categories, and 12 of the German partners received recommendations in their areas of specialty in the Legal 500 Germany 2018 handbook.
- The firm was ranked 6th of all US law firms in London.
- Reed Smith received 18 practice rankings and 42 individual lawyer recommendations in the 2018 edition of The Legal 500 Asia Pacific.
- Reed Smith has been named a 2018 Top Ten Family Friendly Firm by Yale Law Women.
- Reed Smith was named winner of the 2017 Chambers USA Product Liability "Best Firm" award and is also ranked 10th in the United States by media outlet Vault in the same practice group category.
- In 2017, Reed Smith was listed by Law360 as one of the top Global 20 Firms.
- Reed Smith named Private Equity Team of the Year at British Legal Awards 2017.
- According to the National Law Journal's 2017 NLJ 500 ranking of firms based on size, Reed Smith has 1536 attorneys and is ranked 15th in the United States.
- Ranked 17th on Law360's Global 20 Ranking in 2016.
- Legal Week's 2013 annual Client Satisfaction Report ranks Reed Smith #5 in the U.S. International firms category.
- Reed Smith ranked 8th on the 2013 inaugural "Social Index" of Am Law 50 Firms in survey ranking use of social media technologies.
- Reed Smith advances eight spots on Acritas' Sharplegal US Law Firm Brand Index 2014, earning recognition as a Top 20 U.S. brand.
- Ranked 19th among American law firms with the most gross revenue by AmLaw 100 in 2010.
- Ranked 1st out of 411 law firms by The BTI Client Relationship Scorecard for building and maintaining client relationships, June 2009.
- In 2025, Reed Smith was recognized in two categories by the China Business Law Journal in its 2025 China Business Law Awards.

Reed Smith was listed as one of America's Best Corporate Law Firms and one of the 20 world's strongest law firm brands in the 2018 Acritas Global Elite Law Firm Brand Index. It was also listed by market analysts Law360 and BTI Consulting as one of the 20 Elite Global Law Firms.

In the financial year of 2018-19 revenues at Reed Smith increased by 5% reaching $1.17 billion and profits per partner grew 7% to $1.26 million. Reed Smith's London office is the firm's largest and generating the 6th highest revenue of all US-law firms in the United Kingdom while highest-earning partners received a profit share of $3.3 million (£2.5 million) over 2017.

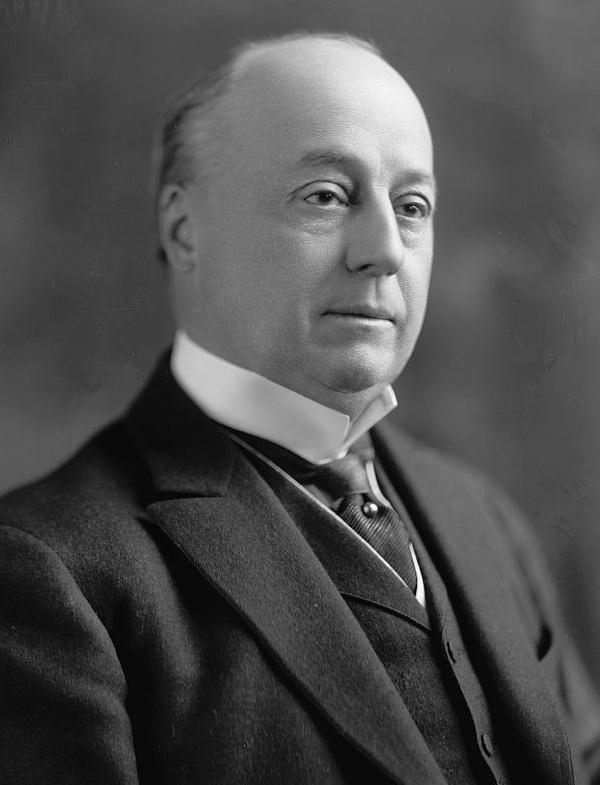
The firm's founding member and former US Secretary of State Philander Knox

== Notable cases and transactions ==
- The firm handled the US and EU competition clearance for Hong Kong shipping firm OOCL in its $6.3 billion acquisition by China's COSCO Shipping.
- Advised United Group B.V. on the $3 billion sale to private equity firm BC Partners from investor Kohlberg Kravis Roberts.
- Successfully dismissed a $6 billion FCA (False Claims Act) suit from the US Department of Justice on behalf of healthcare provider HCR Manor Care.
- Advised Netflix in its suit against Colorado Town over sales-tax bill.
- The firm represented Textainer Group Holdings, the world's largest lessor of intermodal containers based on fleet size, in completing the negotiation and documentation of an amendment to increase its revolving credit facility from $700 million to $1.5 billion.
- Reed Smith advised Deutsche Bank on the sale of a $1 billion portfolio of shipping loans.
- Represents Russian company Concord Management and Consulting in the 2018 indictment on crimes related to interference in the United States 2016 and 2018 elections.
- Reed Smith successfully defended artist Curtis Jackson, better known as 50 Cent, in a number of disputes including a suit accusing him of stealing content from a third party protected under copyright law.
- Represented French luxury perfumes and cosmetics house Lancôme, part of the L'Oréal Luxury Products division, against actress Uma Thurman.
- Represented global financial services holding company The Bank of New York Mellon as trustee or fiscal agent with respect to various bonds issued by governmental instrumentalities of the Commonwealth of Puerto Rico. The Commonwealth and its instrumentalities have approximately $70 billion in debt that they cannot afford to pay and are seeking to restructure.
- Represented multinational financial services company in the largest municipal bankruptcy case in U.S. history in Jefferson County, Alabama, listing more than $4 billion in outstanding long-term debt as of the filing date.
- Reed Smith represented BNY Mellon to fend off a $539 million suit brought by bondholders against the bank in the Argentina bond default litigation.
- Represented Toyota Motor Credit Corp. in securing $15 billion in financing through a syndicated credit facility.
- Advised the Civil Aviation Authority (United Kingdom) pension scheme on a buy-in worth over £1.6 billion with specialist insurer Rothesay Life.
- Reed Smith successfully defended Nintendo against a number of patent disputes by Motion Games.

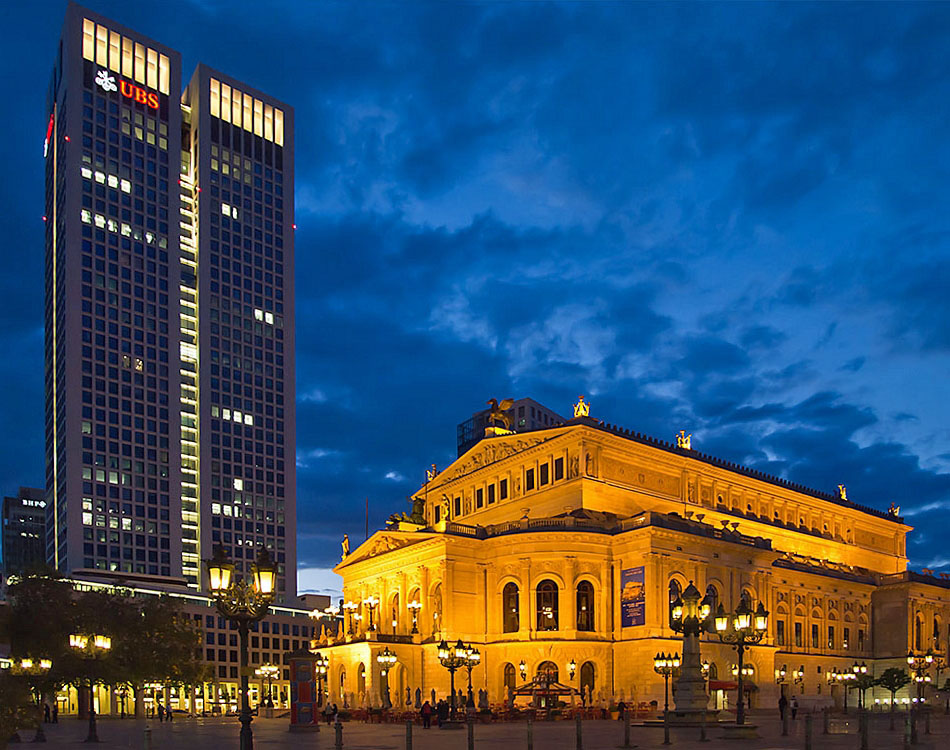
The firm's Frankfurt Office at Opernturm next to Alte Oper

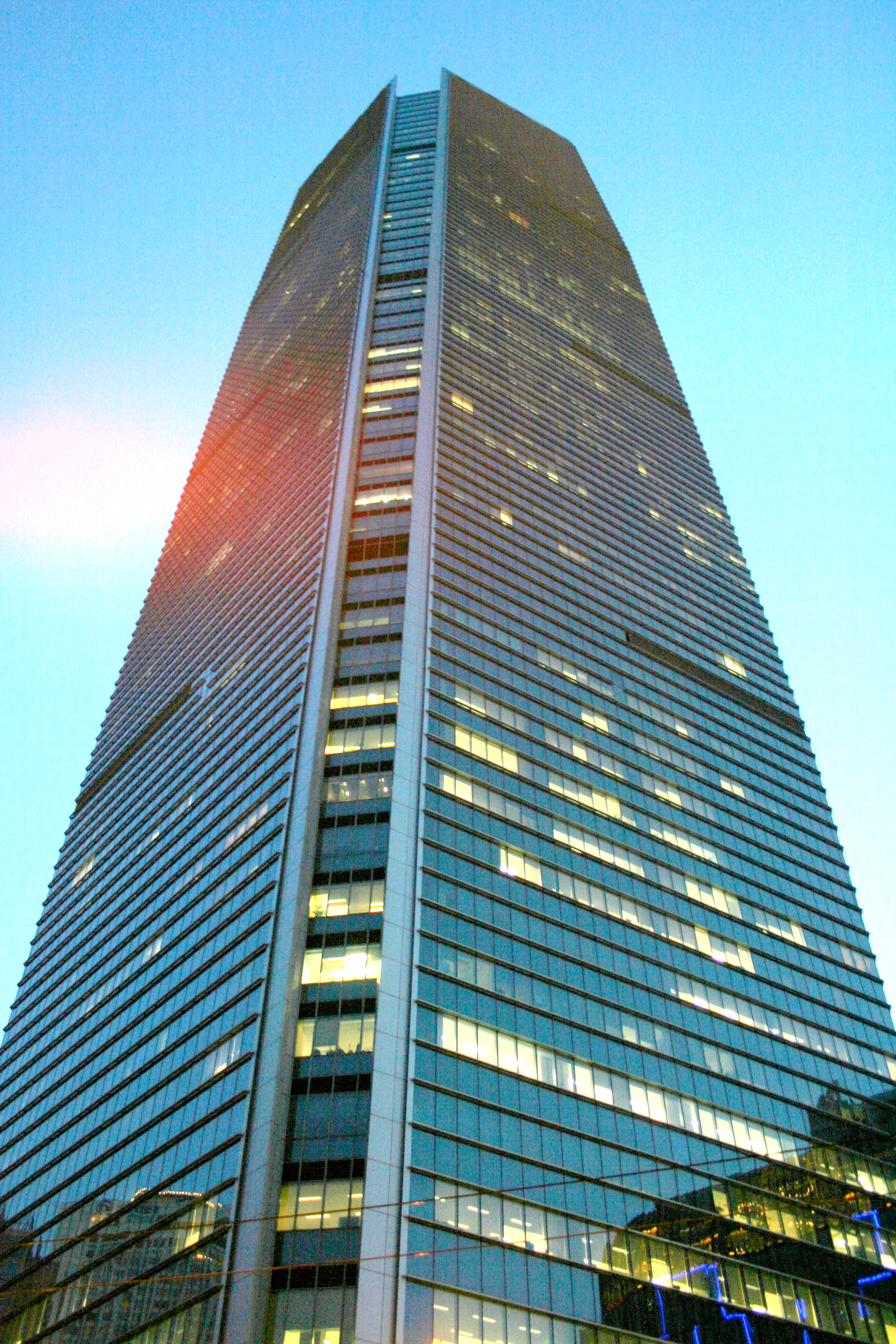
The firm's Shanghai Office at Shanghai Wheelock Square

== Notable staff ==
Attorneys who have worked at Reed Smith include:

- Cathy Bissoon, United States District Court for the Western District of Pennsylvania judge
- David W. Marston, United States Attorney for the United States District Court for the Eastern District of Pennsylvania; author
- Doreen Kong, member of Legislative Council of Hong Kong for the Election Committee constituency
- Jack McGregor, former Pennsylvania State Senator from Pittsburgh; founder of the National Hockey League's Pittsburgh Penguins
- James Hay Reed, founding member of the firm; United States federal judge
- Paul Martha, former American football safety in the NFL; CEO of Pittsburgh Penguins
- Philander C. Knox, Knox and Reed co-founder; bank director; politician who served as United States Attorney General; Senator from Pennsylvania; Secretary of State
- Ralph H. Demmler, corporate banking law specialist; chair of the U.S. Securities and Exchange Commission.
- Rip Sullivan, Northern Virginia community activist; member of the Virginia House of Delegates from Virginia's 48th district
- Ronald D. Castille, Supreme Court of Pennsylvania judge, 1994–2014, and Chief Justice, 2008–14
- Sheryl H. Lipman, United States district judge of the United States District Court for the Western District of Tennessee; former Counsel to the University of Memphis
- Steven Drizin, lawyer and law professor at the Northwestern University Pritzker School of Law
- Thomas Hardiman, federal judge on the United States Court of Appeals for the Third Circuit; former United States District Court judge

== Popular culture ==
The firm is depicted in Laurence Leamer's book The Price of Justice.

== Offices ==
As of January 2018, Reed Smith has 28 offices across three continents. While Pittsburgh and Philadelphia were the two earliest offices practicing law, the London office is the largest office, with over 350 attorneys.

In addition to its offices, Reed Smith has a Global Customer Centre, also located in Pittsburgh, Pennsylvania. It houses Reed Smith's 24/7/365 firm-wide administrative operations, including the Network Operating Center, IT Help Desk and the Business Centre.

== See also ==
- List of largest United States-based law firms by profits per partner
