= Manuel F. Cohen =

Chairman of the U.S. Securities and Exchange Commission

Manuel F. Cohen (October 9, 1912 – June 16, 1977) served as chairman of the U.S. Securities and Exchange Commission between 1964 and 1969 and also served as a member from 1961 to 1969.

== Life and career ==
Born in Brooklyn, he was a graduate of Brooklyn College (B.S. 1933).

During his tenure, the breadth of the prohibitions against insider trading, which had been developed earlier under Chairman William L. Cary, grew substantially as the SEC began to bring the key cases that developed the theories of insider trading on which the SEC relies today.

His daughter Susan Cohen married future United States federal judge Paul D. Borman in 1964.

Government offices
Preceded by William L. Cary	Securities and Exchange Commission Chair; 1964–1969	Succeeded by Hamer H. Budge
