= Luis A. Aguilar =

American lawyer

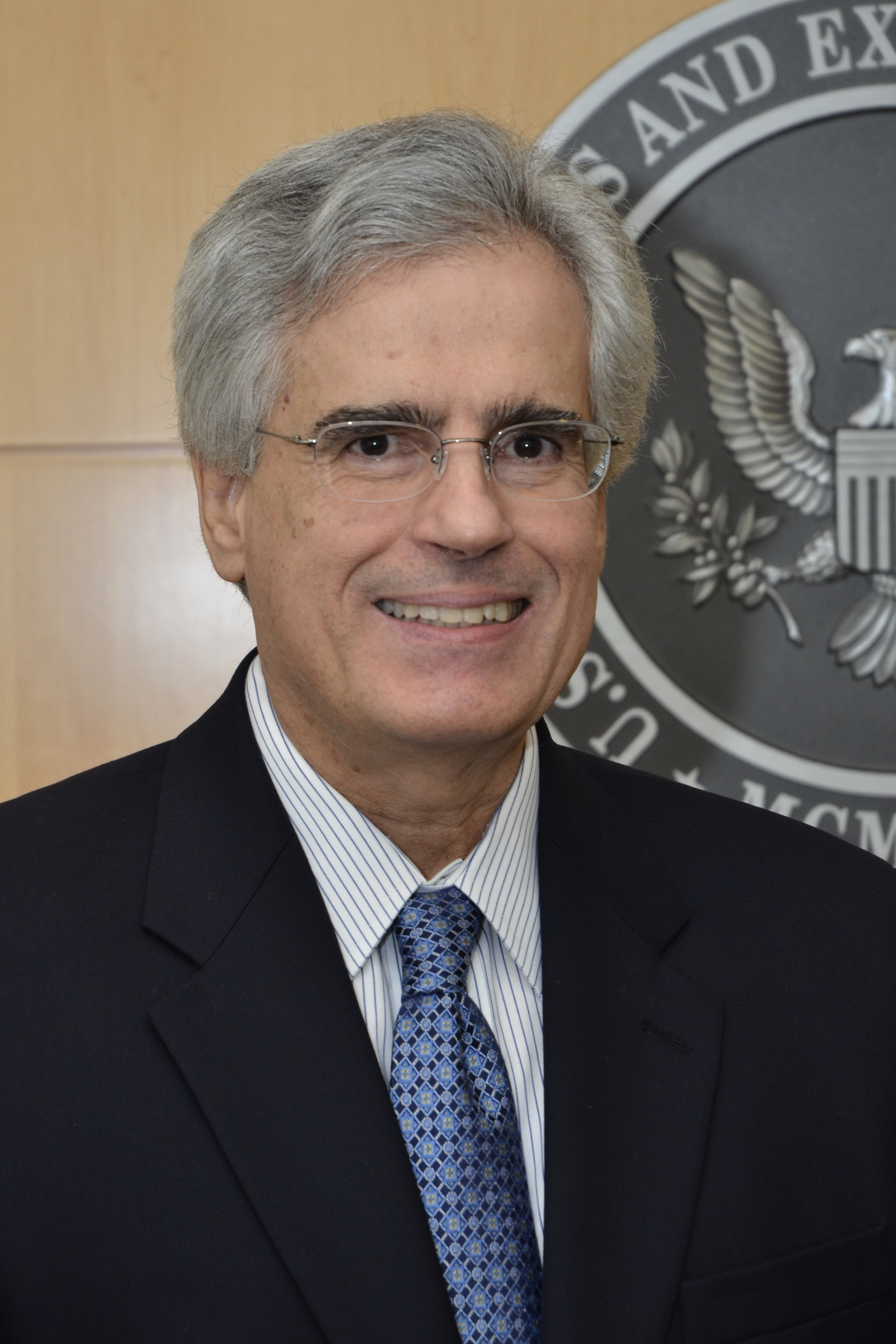

Commissioner of the United States Securities and Exchange Commission
- In office July 31, 2008 – December 31, 2015
- Appointed by: George W. Bush; Barack Obama
- Chairperson: Christopher Cox; Mary Schapiro; Elisse B. Walter; Mary Jo White
- Preceded by: Roel C. Campos
- Succeeded by: Hester M. Peirce

Personal details
- Born: Luis Alberto Aguilar; November 21, 1953 (age 72) Cuba
- Party: Democratic
- Spouse: Denise Traylor
- Education: Georgia Southern University (BS); University of Georgia (JD); Emory University (MLT)
- Occupation: Lawyer

Luis Alberto Aguilar (born November 21, 1953) is an American lawyer and former U.S. government official.

He was the Democratic commissioner of the U.S. Securities and Exchange Commission (SEC) from July 31, 2008, until December 2015 (after his term expired). He had been appointed by U.S. President George W. Bush on March 31, 2008, and confirmed by the U.S. Senate on June 27, 2008; he was sworn in as a commissioner on July 31, 2008. He was reappointed by President Barack Obama in 2011. At the time his tenure ended he was the eight longest-serving Commissioner in SEC history and was one of only three Commissioners to have been nominated by two U.S. Presidents from two different political parties.

== Early life and education ==
Aguilar was born in Cuba and emigrated to the United States in the 1960s.

He is a graduate of the University of Georgia School of Law, and also received a Master of Laws degree in taxation from Emory University. He had earlier earned a bachelor's degree from Georgia Southern University.

== Career ==
Currently he serves on the Boards of Directors of the following companies: Envestnet, Inc. (NYSE: ENV), a leading provider of unified wealth management technology and services to advisors and financial service providers; and Donnelley Financial Solutions, Inc. (NYSE: DFIN), a leading global risk and compliance solutions company serving both the investment and capital markets worldwide. He is also on the Board of Advisors of Personal Capital Corporation, an asset management firm using online financial tools to combine transparency into customer finances with personal attention from financial advisors; and CoinRegTech LLC, a provider of regulatory technology to the digital asset and virtual currency marketplace.

Commissioner Aguilar is also a partner in Falcon Cyber Investments, a firm focused on cybersecurity. He has earned the CERT Certificate in Cybersecurity Oversight, issued by the Software Engineering Institute of Carnegie Mellon University.

Prior to his appointment as an SEC commissioner, Aguilar was a partner with the international law firm of McKenna Long & Aldridge, specializing in securities law. During his career, his practice included matters pertaining to general corporate and business law, international transactions, investment companies and investment advisers, securities law, and corporate finance. He also focused on issues related to corporate governance, public and private offerings (initial public offerings and secondary market offerings), mergers and acquisitions, mutual funds, investment advisers, broker-dealers, and other aspects of federal and state securities laws and regulations.

Aguilar's previous experience includes serving as the general counsel, executive vice president, and corporate secretary of the investment management company Invesco, with responsibility for all legal and compliance matters regarding Invesco Institutional. He also was Invesco's managing director for Latin America in the late 1990s.

His career also includes tenure as a partner at several national law firms and as an attorney at SEC.

=== Other activities ===
He has been active in numerous civic and business associations. From May 2005 to May 2007, he chaired the Latin American Association (LAA), a non-profit organization. He has been active with national organizations, including Hispanic National Bar Association. In 2002, Aguilar was co-chair of the association's annual convention and also served as regional president (for Georgia, Alabama, and Mississippi) (2002–2006), chair of its financial committee (2003–2005), and a member of its board of governors (since 2002). In addition, he served as the president of the Hispanic National Bar Foundation (September 2006 – July 2008).

During his time at the SEC, Commissioner Aguilar represented the Commission as its liaison to both the North American Securities Administrators Association (NASAA) and to the Council of Securities Regulators of the Americas (COSRA). He also served as the primary sponsor of the SEC's first Investor Advisory Committee. In addition, Commissioner Aguilar served as sponsor of the SEC's Hispanic and Latino Opportunity, Leadership, and Advocacy Committee, the SEC’s African American Council, and the SEC’s Caribbean American Heritage Committee.

=== Honors ===
- In March 2023, he was the recipient of the Emory Medal, Emory University’s most prestigious alumni award.
- In September 2021, received the Frankel Fiduciary Prize from the Institute for the Fiduciary Standard for advancing fiduciary principles.
- In October 2020, he had his portrait displayed at the University of Georgia School of Law. He was the first Hispanic so honored since the school’s founding in 1859.
- Selected in 2017 as one of the “Emory Law 100”, recognizing him as one to the 100 most influential alumni of Emory University School of Law in the last 100 years.
- Recipient of Honorary Doctor of Public Service, awarded by Georgia Southern University to honor notable achievements in his profession as well as his dedication to public service (May 11, 2013).
- Recipient of the Atlanta Falcons “2012 NFL Hispanic Heritage Leadership Award” (2012).
- Named by Poder Hispanic Magazine as one of the “100 Most Influential Hispanics in the Nation” (2011).
- Named by Latino Leaders Magazine as one of the “Top 101 Most Influential Latinos in the United States” (2009, 2010, 2011, and 2012).
- Named to the NACD Directorship 100, the Who’s Who of the Boardroom (2009, 2010, 2011, 2012, 2013, 2014, and 2015).
- Recipient of The Center for Accounting Ethics, Governance, and the Public Interest “Accounting in the Public Interest Award” (2010).
- Listed in Best Lawyers in America (2005, 2006, 2007, and 2008).
- Named as one of “Georgia’s Super Lawyers,” as published in Atlanta Magazine and Georgia Super Lawyers Magazine (2004, 2005, 2006, and 2008).
- Recipient of the Chief Justice’s Commission on Professionalism of the Supreme Court of Georgia “Justice Robert Benham Award for Community Service” (2007).
- Named by Atlanta Magazine as one of the “Most Influential Foreign- Born Atlantans” (2007).
- Listed on the Who's Who in Law in the Atlanta Business Chronicle (2004, 2005, 2006, and 2007).
- Named by Hispanic Business Magazine as one of the “100 Influential Hispanics in the United States” (2006).
- Recipient of the MALDEF (Mexican American Legal Defense and Educational Fund) "Excellence in Leadership" Award (2005).
- Named by the Hispanic National Bar Association as “Latino Attorney of the Year” (2005).
- Named by the Georgia Hispanic Chamber of Commerce as “Member of the Year” (2005) and “Atlanta Hispanic Businessman of the Year” (1994).

== Personal life ==
He is married to Denise Traylor Aguilar who hails from Roanoke, Alabama.
