= Roberta Karmel =

American lawyer (1937–2024)

- Born: Roberta Sarah Segal; May 4, 1937; Chicago, Illinois, U.S.
- Died: March 23, 2024 (aged 86); Hastings-on-Hudson, New York, U.S.
- Education: Radcliffe College (BA); New York University School of Law (LLB)
- Occupations: Attorney and law professor
- Years active: 1962–2024
- Employer: Brooklyn Law School
- Known for: First female Commissioner of the Securities and Exchange Commission
- Title: the Centennial Professor of Law, and Co-Director of the Center for the Study of International Business Law
- Board member of: New York Stock Exchange (1983–89)
- Spouses: Paul Karmel (m. 1957; died 1994) David Harrison (m. 1995; died 2021)

Roberta Sarah Karmel (née Segal; May 4, 1937 – March 23, 2024) was an American attorney and the Centennial Professor of Law, and Co-Director of the Center for the Study of International Business Law, at Brooklyn Law School. She was the first female Commissioner of the Securities and Exchange Commission.

== Early life and education ==
Karmel was born in Chicago, Illinois, grew up in its Austin neighborhood, and has one sister. Both of her parents had also been born in Chicago, and her father was a lawyer. She had by her own account a liberal New York Jewish background, which initially made her pro-government intervention in the economy; a sentiment that changed over time.

She attended Austin High School, graduating in 1955, and the University of Michigan in 1955. She received a B.A. from Radcliffe College (cum laude; American History and Literature; 1959). She married her husband Paul Karmel, who died in 1994, after her sophomore year of college. She earned an LL.B. from New York University School of Law (cum laude; 1962), where she was on the NYU Law Review. Her law school class had about 4% women.

== Career ==
Karmel served as an enforcement attorney, Branch Chief, and Assistant Regional Administrator in the Securities and Exchange Commission's New York Regional Office from 1962 to 1969. She later served as a Commissioner of the Securities and Exchange Commission from September 1977 to February 1980, and was the first female SEC Commissioner in the SEC's 48-year history. Having been appointed at 40 years of age, she was one of the youngest Commissioners ever appointed.

She practiced law in New York City at Willkie Farr & Gallagher (1969–72), Rogers & Wells (1972–77; 1980–86), and Kelley Drye & Warren (1987–2002).

Karmel was an adjunct professor of law at Brooklyn Law School from 1973 to 1977 and from 1982 to 1985, and was a full professor there starting in 1985. She was Centennial Professor of Law, and Co-Director of the Center for the Study of International Business Law, at Brooklyn Law School. She taught securities regulation.

Karmel served as a public director of the New York Stock Exchange from 1983 to 1989, the third woman to serve on its board of directors. She was a Fulbright Scholar in 1991-92.

Karmel was a trustee and Chair of the Practising Law Institute. She was Co-Chair of the International Coordinating Committee of the Section of Business Law of the American Bar Association and Chair of the AALS Section on Securities Regulation. She was a member of the Advisory Committee on capital markets law to Unidroit, a member of the American Law Institute, and a Fellow of the American Bar Foundation.

Karmel wrote 50 articles in books and legal journals, and has written a regular column on securities regulation for the New York Law Journal. Her book entitled Regulation by Prosecution: The Securities and Exchange Commission vs. Corporate America was published by Simon and Schuster in 1982. Her book Life at the Center: Reflections on Fifty Years of Securities Regulation was published by Practising Law Institute in 2014.

Karmel received the William O. Douglas Award from the Association of Securities and Exchange Commission Alumni, the Direct Women Award from the Sandra Day O'Connor Board of Excellence, the Margaret Brent Women Lawyers of Achievement Award from the American Bar Association, and the Albert Nelson Marquis Lifetime Achievement Award from Marquis Who's Who.

== Death ==
Karmel died in Hastings-on-Hudson, New York at the age of 86 on March 23, 2024 due to pancreatic cancer.
