= James J. Caffrey =

James J. Caffrey served as chairman of the U.S. Securities and Exchange Commission between 1946 and 1947 and also served as a member from 1945 to 1947. He graduated from Harvard University.

Government offices
Preceded by Ganson Purcell	Securities and Exchange Commission Chair; 1946-1947	Succeeded by Edmond M. Hanrahan
