= Victor M. Longstreet =

Victor Mendell Longstreet (January 1, 1907 – February 5, 2000) was an economist and at one time the president of the Boston Consulting Group. From 1962 to 1965, he was United States Assistant Secretary of the Navy (Financial Management and Comptroller).

== Biography ==
Victor M. Longstreet was born and raised in Louisville, Kentucky, and graduated from duPont Manual High School in 1925. He was educated in economics at Harvard University, taking his degree magna cum laude in 1930.

His first job after graduating was working as an economist at AT&T. He later took a job as an economist at the Federal Reserve Board. During World War II, he served in the United States Army.

After the war, Longstreet joined the United States Department of State's economic development division. In 1948, he joined the Economic Cooperation Administration and worked in their office in the Netherlands, and later Paris, until 1952. Upon returning to the U.S., in the mid-1950s, he became vice president and manager of the Louisville branch of the Federal Reserve Bank of St. Louis. Next, he left the public sector to become director of management research at Schering Corporation.

In 1962, President of the United States John F. Kennedy nominated Longstreet as Assistant Secretary of the Navy (Financial Management and Comptroller), and Longstreet subsequently held this office from September 14, 1962, until December 31, 1965.

In the later 1960s, Longstreet began a career as a management consultant, joining International Management Group of Boston as an associate director. He later moved to the Boston Consulting Group and served as its chairman.

Longstreet retired to Bethesda, Maryland, and died there of pneumonia on February 5, 2000, at the age of 94.

== Selected publications ==
- Victor M. Longstreet, "Investments and Liquidity of Member Banks During 1939," Federal Reserve Bulletin, April 1940, pp. 293–297.
- Victor M. Longstreet, "Bank Lending for Defense," Federal Reserve Bulletin, September 1941, pp. 866–874.
- Victor M. Longstreet, "Management R & D," Harvard Business Review, July–August 1961, pp. 125–134.
- Victor M. Longstreet, Financial Control in Multi-National Companies, 1971.

Government offices
Preceded by J. Sinclair Armstrong	Assistant Secretary of the Navy (Financial Management and Comptroller); September 14, 1962 – December 31, 1965	Succeeded by Charles F. Baird
