= Edward N. Gadsby =

Chairman of the U.S. Securities and Exchange Commission between 1957 and 1961

Chairman of the U.S. Securities and Exchange Commission
- In office August 20, 1957 – March 26, 1961
- President: Dwight D. Eisenhower; John F. Kennedy
- Preceded by: J. Sinclair Armstrong
- Succeeded by: William L. Cary

Chair of the Massachusetts Department of Public Utilities
- In office 1947–1949
- Preceded by: Carroll L. Meins
- Succeeded by: Thomas A. Flaherty

Personal details
- Born: Edward Northup Gadsby; April 11, 1900 North Adams, Massachusetts, U.S.
- Died: June 12, 1973 (aged 73) Boston, Massachusetts, U.S.
- Spouse: Isabelle Halsey
- Children: 2
- Education: Amherst College; New York University School of Law
- Occupation: Lawyer and appointed United States government official

Edward N. Gadsby served as chairman of the U.S. Securities and Exchange Commission between 1957 and 1961.
