= Ralph H. Demmler =

American corporate lawyer and chairman of the U.S. Securities and Exchange Commission

Chairman of the U.S. Securities and Exchange Commission
- In office June 17, 1953 – May 25, 1955
- President: Dwight D. Eisenhower
- Preceded by: Donald C. Cook
- Succeeded by: J. Sinclair Armstrong

Personal details
- Born: August 22, 1904
- Died: December 23, 1995 (aged 91) Pittsburgh, Pennsylvania, United States
- Party: Republican Party
- Spouse: Catherine Demmler
- Children: John H. Demmler
- Education: Allegheny College; University of Pittsburgh
- Occupation: Lawyer and appointed United States government official

Ralph H. Demmler (August 22, 1904 – December 23, 1995) was an American lawyer – specializing in corporate banking law – and chairman of the U.S. Securities and Exchange Commission from June 1953 to May 1955.

== Early life and education ==
Ralph Demmler was an accomplished lawyer who graduated from Allegheny College, where he was inducted into Phi Beta Kappa, an honor recognizing academic excellence. He earned his law degree from the University of Pittsburgh. Demmler is notable for his career in law, where he made significant contributions, including holding prominent positions in government and the private sector. His educational background laid a strong foundation for his later achievements in the legal field.

== Career ==
He began his law practice in Pittsburgh in 1928.

In 1943, Demmler joined the law firm Reed Smith Shaw & McClay and was elected a partner in 1948.

A member of the Republican Party, he served as chairman of the U.S. Securities and Exchange Commission (SEC) between June 1953 and 1955. Demmler had been appointed a member of the commission just earlier.

From 1969 until 1980, he was an adviser on an American Law Institute project to codify federal securities laws.

In 1972, the SEC appointed Demmler to its Special Committee on Enforcement Policy.

=== Corporate directorships ===
During his career, he served as a member of the board of various corporations, including Duquesne Light, Sharon Steel and Hammermill Paper.

== Personal life ==
Demmler died, age 91, in Pittsburgh, Pennsylvania. At his death, he was survived by Catherine, his wife of 66 years. Demmler was also survived by a son John H. Demmler and three grandchildren.

== See also ==
- Attorneys in the United States
- List of Allegheny College alumni
- List of University of Pittsburgh people
- List of people from the Pittsburgh metropolitan area
