= Hester Peirce =

American lawyer

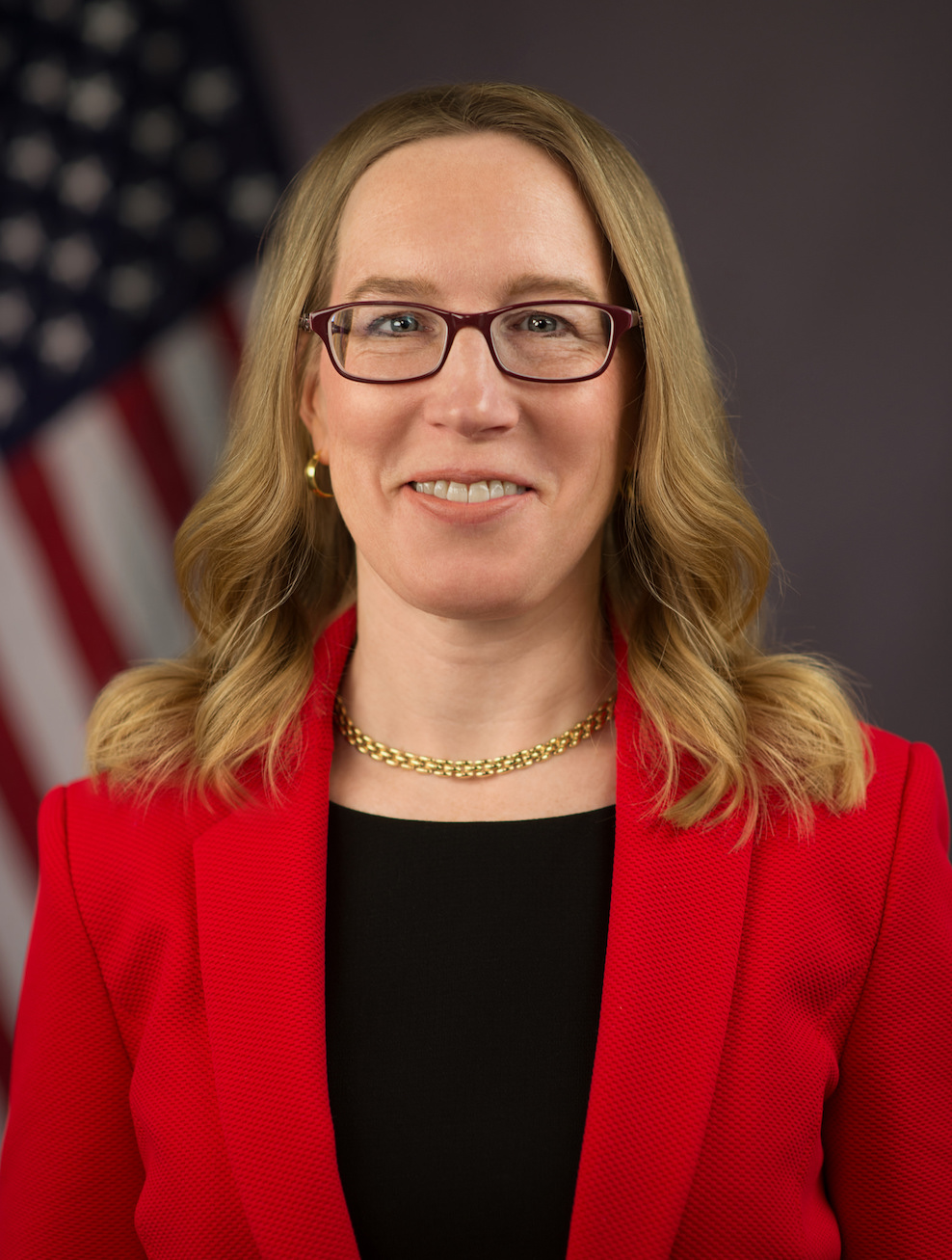

Commissioner of the United States Securities and Exchange Commission
- In office January 11, 2018 – October 2, 2026
- President: Donald Trump; Joe Biden; Donald Trump
- Preceded by: Luis A. Aguilar
- Succeeded by: vacant

Personal details
- Party: Republican
- Education: Case Western Reserve University (BA); Yale University (JD)

Hester Maria Peirce is an American lawyer who serves as a Commissioner on the Securities and Exchange Commission (SEC). She previously served as the director of the Financial Markets Working Group at George Mason University's Mercatus Center.

Peirce was nominated by President Donald Trump and confirmed by the United States Senate in December 2017 to fill a Republican vacancy on the SEC. She was sworn in on January 11, 2018, for a term ending in 2020, and her second term expires in 2025. Peirce is a former staff member of the United States Senate Committee on Banking, Housing, and Urban Affairs and of the SEC. She was initially nominated by President Barack Obama for a Republican seat on the SEC in 2015, but the United States Senate did not act on her nomination.

Known as a critic of enforcement and regulatory efforts against cryptocurrency firms, she was appointed to head the SEC's crypto task force during the second Donald Trump administration amid a larger deregulatory effort by the Trump administration.

== Education ==
Peirce earned her B.A. in economics from Case Western Reserve University (1993) and her J.D. from Yale Law School (1997).

== Career ==
=== Legal career ===
Peirce started her career as a clerk for Judge Roger Andewelt on the Court of Federal Claims from 1997 to 1998. Afterwards, she was an associate at Washington, D.C. law firm Wilmer, Cutler & Pickering (today WilmerHale) between 1998 and 2000. In 2000, Peirce served at the Securities and Exchange Commission, first as a staff attorney in the Division of Investment Management from 2000 to 2004 and then as counsel to Commissioner Paul S. Atkins from 2004 to 2008.

Afterwards, Peirce worked as part of Senator Richard Shelby's staff on the Senate Committee on Banking, Housing, and Urban Affairs. In that position, Peirce's work mostly centered on the financial regulatory reform after the 2008 financial crisis and the oversight of the regulatory implementation of the Dodd–Frank Act.

Between 2012 and 2017, Peirce was a senior research fellow and the director of the Financial Markets Working Group at the Mercatus Center at George Mason University where she also teaches as an adjunct professor at the Antonin Scalia Law School. Peirce is a member of the Federalist Society.

=== U.S. Securities and Exchange Commission ===
In 2015, Peirce was chosen during the Obama administration to fill a Republican seat at the U.S. Securities and Exchange Commission. Democrats on the Senate Banking Committee attempted to block her nomination because she declined to fully commit to requiring corporations to publicly disclose political donations. Peirce was eventually approved by the Senate Banking Committee, but the full Senate never voted on her nomination.

On July 18, 2017, the White House announced that President Donald Trump would nominate Peirce as a Commissioner of the SEC for the remainder of a five-year term expiring on June 5, 2020. She was confirmed by the U.S. Senate on December 21, 2017, and sworn in on January 11, 2018. On August 6, 2020, the Senate confirmed Peirce by voice vote for another five-year term expiring on June 5, 2025, and was sworn in on August 17, 2020.

On May 19, 2026, Regent University announced that Pierce will join the law faculty in the Fall 2026 semester.

== Views ==
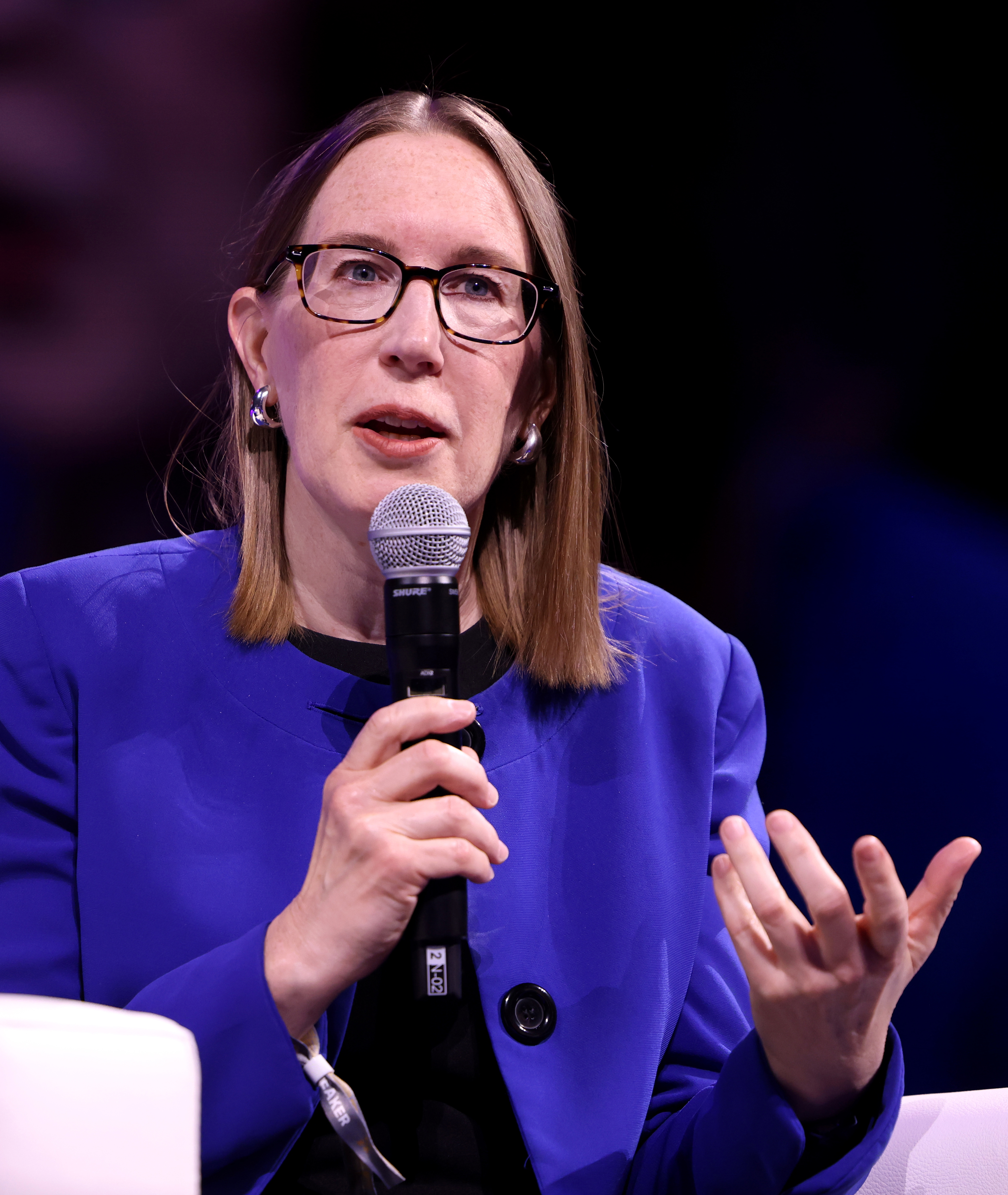
Peirce speaking at Bitcoin 2025 in Las Vegas, Nevada.

Peirce regularly contributed through books, articles, comments and statements to the debate about banking regulation. She has been critical of the regulatory expansion enacted in response to the 2008 financial crisis. In her 2012 book Dodd-Frank, What It Does and Why It's Flawed, she argues for economic freedom and against the idea that markets could be improved through regulatory ‘micromanagement’. She stated that the more important regulation becomes, the less are banks oriented towards their actual duty, which is to service customers with financial opportunities. In 2016, a book she co-edited entitled Reframing Financial Regulation: Enhancing Stability and Protecting Consumers was published by the Mercatus Center.

Peirce had opinion editorials published in The New York Times in 2012 and in 2013, wherein she said it would be more sensible to let the market pare the big banks down to size rather than nationalizing them. Peirce has also authored articles in American Banker, The Hill and FinRegRag. In January 2017, she spoke at the American Economic Association in Chicago, where she discussed reforms of the role of financial regulators a topic she had previously raised in a video by the Mercatus Center in 2015.

In 2018, Peirce argued that lawyers who work for large corporations practice a form of public interest law. She also suggested that her own work at the SEC "indirectly" qualified as public interest law.

=== Cryptocurrency ===
Peirce has been critical of many regulatory efforts and criminal cases against cryptocurrency companies, and has been seen as a long-time supporter of the crypto industry, leading cryptocurrency supporters to call her "Crypto Mom". In 2023, she dissented with the SEC on LBRY after the blockchain company was charged by the SEC for conducting an unregistered securities offering; she questioned the merit of enforcement in the SEC's first NFT case; and questioned the SEC's rejection of spot crypto exchange-traded products. On May 25, 2022, Peirce stated that the United States had "dropped the regulatory ball" with respect to cryptocurrency regulation.

Shortly after the start of the second Donald Trump administration, she was appointed to head the SEC's new crypto task force. The second Trump administration substantially softened enforcement against the crypto industry amid financial ties between Trump businesses and crypto firms.
