= Edmond M. Hanrahan =

American lawyer and government official

Chair of the U.S. Securities and Exchange Commission
- In office May 18, 1948 - November 3, 1949
- President: Harry S. Truman
- Preceded by: James J. Caffrey
- Succeeded by: Harry A. McDonald

Personal details
- Died: June 10, 1979
- Spouse(s): Ethel M. Byrne (married 1934, died 1957; Ethel A. Prendergast Drew (married circa 1962)

Edmond M. Hanrahan (died June 10, 1979) was an American lawyer and government official. He served as chairman of the U.S. Securities and Exchange Commission between 1948 and 1949 and also served as a member from 1946 to 1949. He was appointed to the New York State Racing Commission in 1957 and served until 1975.

Hanrahan was appointed by New York state governor W. Averell Harriman to the New York State Racing Authority in 1957. He left the post in 1974.

Hanrahan graduated from Fordham University School of Law in 1929.

== Corporate directorships ==
He was a director of American Truck Leasing Corporation and other companies.
