= Hamer Budge =

American politician (1910–2003)

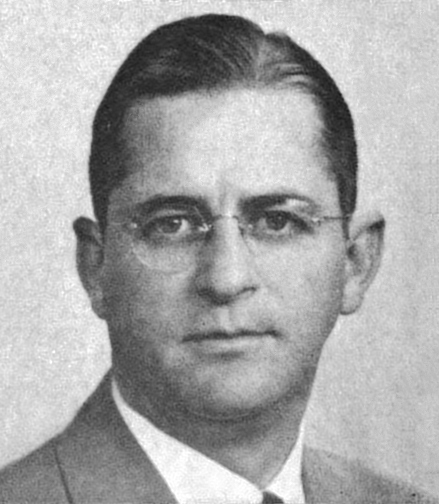

16th Chair of the Securities and Exchange Commission
- In office February 22, 1969 – January 2, 1971
- President: Richard Nixon
- Preceded by: Manuel F. Cohen
- Succeeded by: William J. Casey

Member of the U.S. House of Representatives from Idaho's 2nd district
- In office January 3, 1951 – January 3, 1961
- Preceded by: John Sanborn
- Succeeded by: Ralph Harding

Personal details
- Born: Hamer Harold Budge; November 21, 1910 Pocatello, Idaho, U.S.
- Died: July 22, 2003 (aged 92) Scottsdale, Arizona, U.S.
- Party: Republican
- Spouse(s): Marjorie Jeanne Keithly; Budge (1916–2007) (m.1941–2003, his death)
- Children: 1
- Education: Stanford University (BA); University of Idaho (JD)

Military service
- Allegiance: United States
- Branch/service: United States Navy
- Years of service: 1942–1945
- Rank: Lieutenant Commander
- Battles/wars: World War II

Hamer Harold Budge (November 21, 1910 – July 22, 2003) was an American attorney politician. He was a five-term congressman from Idaho and later chaired the Securities and Exchange Commission.

== Early life and education ==
Born in Pocatello, Idaho, Budge was the youngest of eight children of a Justice of the Idaho Supreme Court Alfred Budge and Ella Hoge Budge, and grandson of Idaho political figure William Budge. His father was appointed to the Idaho Supreme Court in November 1914, and the family relocated from Pocatello to Boise. Justice Budge retired from the state's highest court 34 years later in December 1948, at age 80.

Hamer Budge attended public schools in Boise and the College of Idaho in Caldwell. He transferred to Stanford University in Palo Alto, California, and graduated in 1933, then attended the University of Idaho College of Law in Moscow.

== Career ==
After graduating from law school in 1936, went into private practice in Boise. He was a member of the state legislature from 1939 through 1941 and in 1949 and served in the U.S. Navy during World War II, from 1942 through 1945, leaving as a lieutenant commander.

=== U.S. House of Representatives ===
When Republican Congressman John Sanborn chose to pursue the U.S. Senate seat rather than a third term in 1950, it left the 2nd district seat open. Both nominees were from Boise, and Budge defeated Democratic state senator James Hawley in the 1950 election to become the first Mormon to represent Idaho in either house of Congress. He served in the House for ten years; an attempt at a sixth term came up short in 1960, with a loss to 31-year-old Democrat Ralph Harding of Blackfoot. Budge voted against the Civil Rights Act of 1957 and 1960.

=== Securities and Exchange Commission ===
When his fifth congressional term ended in 1961, Budge became a judge in the Third Judicial District of Idaho in Boise. In 1964, he was appointed to the U.S. Securities and Exchange Commission (SEC) by President Lyndon B. Johnson; he was chairman of the SEC in the Nixon administration from 1969 until he resigned on January 2, 1971.

Budge then served as the president of a mutual funds group in Minneapolis until he retired in 1978.

He was a member of the Elks, Eagles, American Bar Association, and Sigma Alpha Epsilon

== Personal life ==
He died in 2003 at age 92 in Arizona.

Government offices
| Preceded by Manuel F. Cohen | Securities and Exchange Commission Chair; 1969–1971 | Succeeded by William J. Casey |
