= Donald C. Cook =

Chairman of US Securities and Exchange Commission

Chair of the Securities and Exchange Commission
- In office February 26, 1952 – June 17, 1953
- President: Harry S. Truman; Dwight D. Eisenhower
- Preceded by: Harry A. McDonald
- Succeeded by: Ralph H. Demmler

Personal details
- Born: April 14, 1909 Escanaba, Michigan, U.S.
- Died: December 16, 1981 (aged 72) New York City, New York, U.S.
- Party: Democratic
- Education: University of Michigan; George Washington University Law School

Donald Clarence Cook (April 14, 1909 – December 16, 1981) was chairman of the U.S. Securities and Exchange Commission between 1952 and 1953 and also served as a member from 1949 to 1953.

Cook was a resident student at the University of Michigan College of Literature, Science and the Arts in 1927. He ultimately became chairman of American Electric Power (1962–1976) Donald C. Cook Nuclear Generating Station is named for him.
