= Ganson Purcell =

Chairman of the U.S. Securities and Exchange Commission

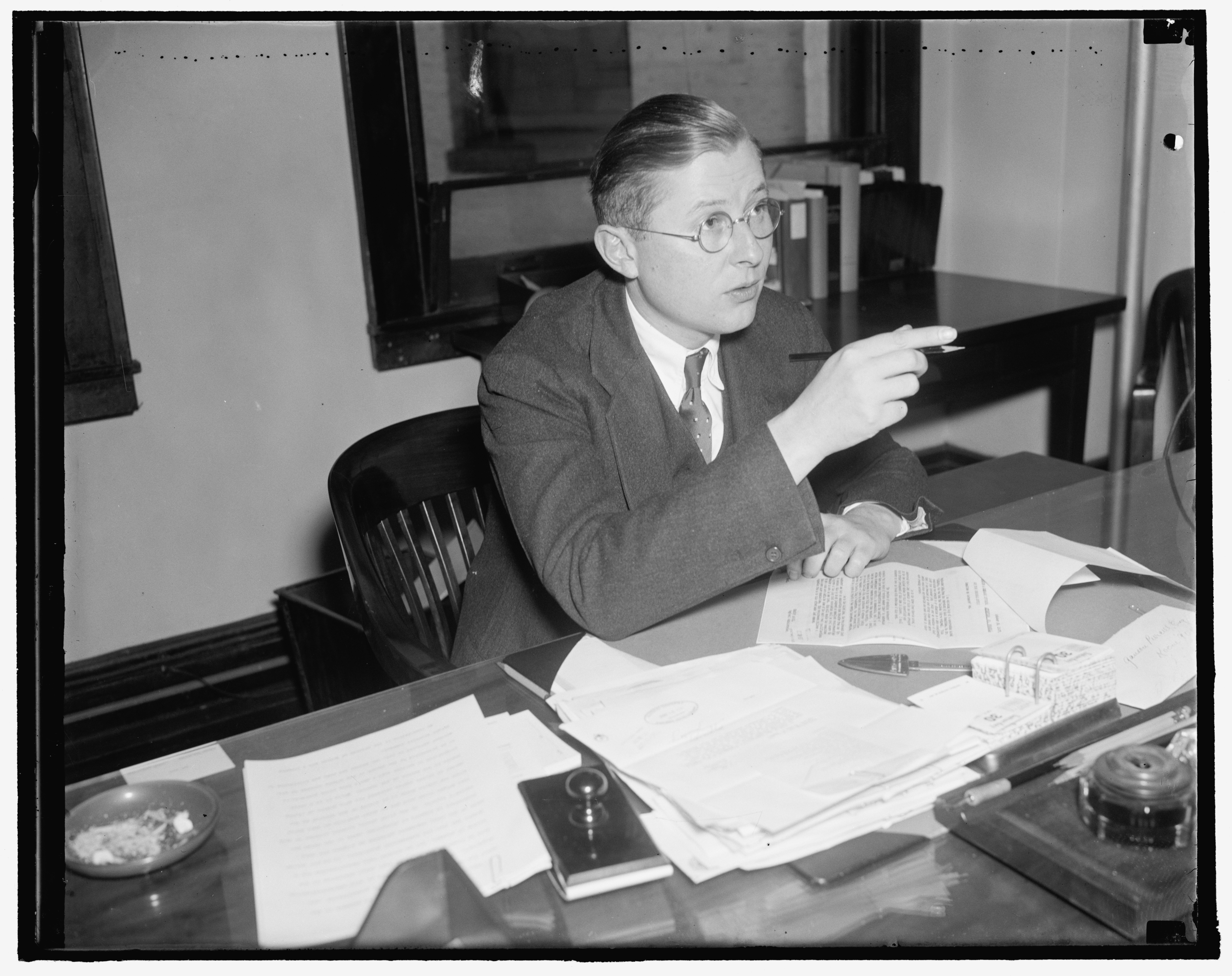

Ganson Purcell (1905 – November 21, 1967) served as chairman of the U.S. Securities and Exchange Commission between 1942 and 1946 and also served as a member from 1941 to 1946 as the replacement to Jerome Frank. He graduated from Williams College in 1927 and Harvard Law School in 1930.
