= William L. Cary =

US Securities and Exchange Commission member (1910–1983)

William Lucius Cary (1910–1983) served as chairman of the U.S. Securities and Exchange Commission between 1961 and 1964.

Chairman Cary graduated from Yale University in 1931 and later served with the Office of Strategic Services (OSS) in the former Yugoslavia and Romania during World War II. He was a Dwight Professor of Law at Columbia University when President John F. Kennedy appointed him as SEC Chairman.

In 1974 he wrote Federalism and Corporate Law: Reflections Upon Delaware, an article in the Yale Law Journal that has been cited frequently for decades as the classic argument for federalizing the issuance of corporate charters.

== Family ==
He married Katherine Lemoine Fenimore Cooper, a second great-granddaughter of James Fenimore Cooper, in 1954. They had two daughters:

- Linn Fenimore Cooper Cary (married writer Ved Mehta in 1983)
- Katrina Fenimore Cooper Cary
