= United States Securities and Exchange Commission =

Government agency overseeing stock exchanges

- Seal of the U.S. Securities and Exchange Commission

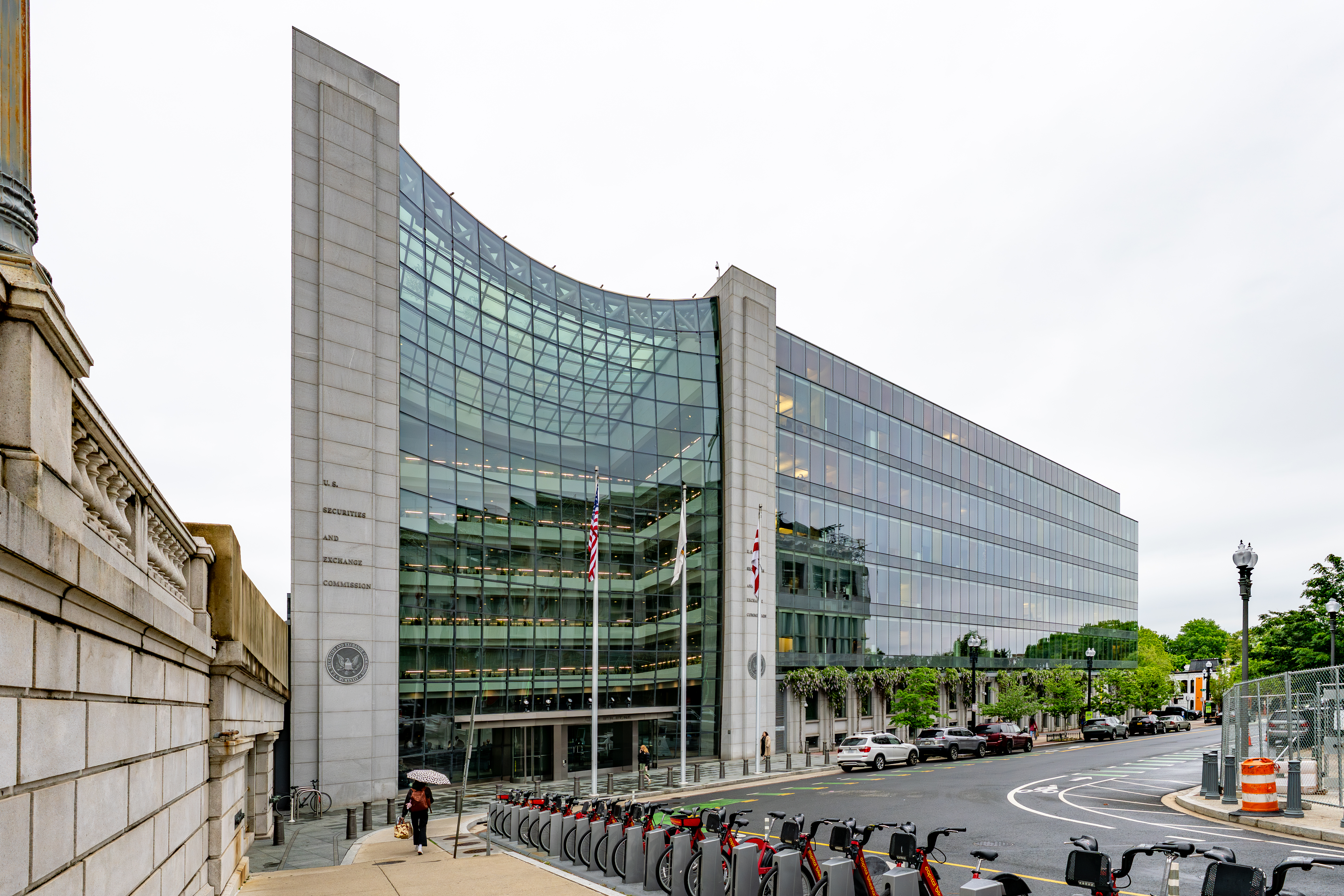
- U.S. Securities and Exchange Commission headquarters in Washington, D.C.

Agency overview
- Formed: June 6, 1934; 92 years ago
- Jurisdiction: United States federal government
- Headquarters: Washington, D.C., U.S.
- Employees: 4,920 (FY2024)
- Agency executive: Paul S. Atkins, Chairman
- Website: sec.gov

The United States Securities and Exchange Commission (SEC) is an independent agency of the United States federal government, created in the aftermath of the Wall Street crash of 1929. Its primary purpose is to enforce laws against market manipulation.

Created by Section 4 of the Securities Exchange Act of 1934 (now codified as 15 U.S.C. § 78d and commonly referred to as the Exchange Act or the 1934 Act), the SEC enforces the Securities Act of 1933, the Trust Indenture Act of 1939, the Investment Company Act of 1940, the Investment Advisers Act of 1940, and the Sarbanes–Oxley Act of 2002, among other statutes.

== Overview ==
The SEC has a three-part mission: to protect investors; maintain fair, orderly, and efficient markets; and facilitate capital formation.

To achieve its mandate, the SEC enforces the statutory requirement that public companies and other regulated entities submit quarterly and annual reports, as well as other periodic disclosures. In addition to annual financial reports, company executives must provide a narrative account, called the "management discussion and analysis" (MD&A), that outlines the previous year of operations and explains how the company fared in that time period. MD&A usually addresses the upcoming year, outlining future goals and approaches to new projects.

Quarterly and semiannual reports from public companies are crucial for investors to make sound decisions when investing in capital markets. Unlike banking, investment in capital markets is not guaranteed by the federal government. The potential for large gains needs to be weighed against that of sizable losses. Mandatory disclosure of financial and other information about the issuer and the security itself gives private individuals as well as large institutions the same fundamental facts about the public companies they invest in, thereby increasing public scrutiny while reducing insider trading and fraud.

In an attempt to level the playing field for all investors, the SEC maintains an online database called EDGAR (the Electronic Data Gathering, Analysis, and Retrieval system) from which investors can access information filed with the agency, such as reports. The same online system also accepts tips and complaints from investors to help the SEC track down violators of the securities laws, as well as offering publications on investment-related topics for public education. The SEC maintains a strict policy of refraining from commenting on the existence or status of any ongoing investigation.

== History ==
=== Background ===
Prior to the enactment of the federal securities laws and the creation of the SEC, securities trading was governed by so-called blue sky laws. These laws were enacted and enforced at the state level and regulated the offering and sale of securities to protect the public from fraud. Though the specific provisions of these laws varied among states, they all required the registration of all securities offerings and sales, as well as of every U.S. stockbroker and brokerage firm. However, blue sky laws were generally considered ineffective. For example, as early as 1915, the Investment Bankers Association told its members that they could circumvent blue sky laws by making securities offerings across state lines through the mail.

=== Founding ===
The SEC's authority was established by the Securities Act of 1933 and Securities Exchange Act of 1934; both laws are considered parts of Franklin D. Roosevelt's New Deal program.

After the Pecora Commission hearings on abuses and frauds in securities markets, Congress passed the Securities Act of 1933 (15 U.S.C. § 77a), which federally regulates original issues of securities across state lines, primarily by requiring that issuing companies register distributions prior to sale so that investors may access basic financial information and make informed decisions. For the first year of the law's enactment, the enforcement of the statute rested with the Federal Trade Commission.

The subsequent Securities Exchange Act of 1934 (15 U.S.C. § 78d) regulates secondary markets for securities. The 1934 Act regulates secondary trading between individuals and companies which are often unrelated to the original issuers of securities. Entities under the SEC's authority include securities exchanges with physical trading floors such as the New York Stock Exchange, self-regulatory organizations, the Municipal Securities Rulemaking Board, NASDAQ, alternative trading systems, and any other persons engaged in transactions for the accounts of others. Section 4 of the 1934 Act transferred the FTC's enforcement authority under the 1933 Act to the newly created Securities and Exchange Commission and tasked the new commission with enforcing both acts.

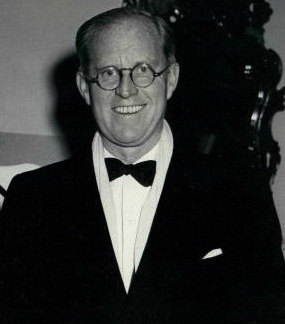
Joseph P. Kennedy Sr, the inaugural chairman of the SEC

In 1934, Roosevelt named his friend Joseph P. Kennedy, a self-made multimillionaire, financier, and leader among the Irish-American community, as chairman of the SEC. Roosevelt chose Kennedy partly based on his experience on Wall Street. Two of the other five commissioners were James M. Landis and Ferdinand Pecora. Kennedy added a number of intelligent young lawyers to the SEC staff, including William O. Douglas and Abe Fortas, both of whom later became Supreme Court justices.

Another of Kennedy’s early appointees was David Saperstein, a former associate counsel to the Pecora Commission who helped draft the Securities Exchange Act of 1934. As the SEC’s first Director of the Division of Trading and Exchange, Saperstein oversaw the registration of brokers and dealers, the creation of the first federal rules for over-the-counter markets, and issued early policy interpretations—such as the 1937 "Saperstein Interpretation"—that shaped the Commission’s approach to market structure and conflicts of interest.

Kennedy's team defined four missions for the new commission: (1) to restore investor confidence in the securities market, which had practically collapsed; (2) to restore integrity to securities markets by prosecuting and eliminating fraudulent and unsound practices targeting investors; (3) to end million-dollar insider trading by top officials of major corporations; and (4) to establish a complex and universal system of registration for securities sold in America, with a clear-cut set of deadlines, rules and guidelines. The SEC succeeded; Kennedy reassured the American business community that they would no longer be deceived and tricked and taken advantage of by Wall Street. He became a cheerleader for ordinary investors to return to the market and enable the economy to grow again.

Later SEC commissioners and chairmen include William O. Douglas, Jerome Frank, and William J. Casey.

Since 1994, most registration statements (and associated materials) filed with the SEC can be accessed via the SEC's online system, EDGAR.

=== 21st century ===
In 2019, the Securities and Exchange Commission Historical Society introduced an online gallery to illustrate changes in the US securities market structure since the 1930s. The online gallery features a narrative history supported by dozens of documents, papers, interviews, photos and videos.

=== List of chairs ===
No.	Portrait	Name	State of residency	Term of office			Appointed by
No.	Portrait	Name	State of residency	Term start	Term end	Time in office	Appointed by
1	Joseph P. Kennedy Sr.	Joseph P. Kennedy Sr.	Massachusetts	June 30, 1934	September 23, 1935	1 year, 85 days	Roosevelt
2	James M. Landis	James M. Landis	Massachusetts	September 23, 1935	September 15, 1937	1 year, 357 days	Roosevelt
3	William O. Douglas	William O. Douglas	Connecticut	August 17, 1937	April 15, 1939	1 year, 241 days	Roosevelt
4	Jerome Frank	Jerome Frank	Illinois	May 18, 1939	April 9, 1941	1 year, 326 days	Roosevelt
5	Edward C. Eicher	Edward C. Eicher	Iowa	April 9, 1941	January 20, 1942	286 days	Roosevelt
6	Ganson Purcell	Ganson Purcell		January 20, 1942	June 30, 1946	4 years, 161 days	Roosevelt
7		James J. Caffrey		July 23, 1946	December 31, 1947	1 year, 161 days	Truman
8		Edmond M. Hanrahan	New York	May 18, 1948	November 3, 1949	1 year, 169 days	Truman
9		Harry A. McDonald		November 4, 1949	February 25, 1952	2 years, 113 days	Truman
10		Donald C. Cook	Michigan	February 26, 1952	June 17, 1953	1 year, 111 days	Truman
11		Ralph H. Demmler	Pennsylvania	June 27, 1953	May 25, 1955	1 year, 332 days	Eisenhower
12		J. Sinclair Armstrong	New York	May 25, 1955	June 27, 1957	2 years, 33 days	Eisenhower
13		Edward N. Gadsby	Massachusetts	August 20, 1957	March 26, 1961	3 years, 218 days	Eisenhower
14		William L. Cary		March 27, 1961	August 20, 1964	3 years, 146 days	Kennedy
15		Manuel F. Cohen		August 20, 1964	February 22, 1969	4 years, 186 days	Johnson
16	Hamer Budge	Hamer Budge	Idaho	February 22, 1969	January 2, 1971	1 year, 314 days	Nixon
17	William J. Casey	William J. Casey	New York	April 14, 1971	February 2, 1973	1 year, 294 days	Nixon
18		G. Bradford Cook	Nebraska	March 3, 1973	May 16, 1973	74 days	Nixon
19		Ray Garrett Jr.	Illinois	August 6, 1973	October 28, 1975	2 years, 83 days	Nixon
20		Roderick M. Hills	California	October 28, 1975	April 10, 1977	1 year, 164 days	Ford
21		Harold M. Williams	California	April 18, 1977	March 1, 1981	3 years, 317 days	Carter
22		John S. R. Shad		May 6, 1981	June 18, 1987	6 years, 43 days	Reagan
23		David Sturtevant Ruder	Illinois	August 7, 1987	September 30, 1989	2 years, 54 days	Reagan
24		Richard C. Breeden	New York	October 11, 1989	May 7, 1993	3 years, 208 days	Bush Sr.
–	Mary Schapiro	Mary Schapiro (acting)	New York	May 7, 1993	July 27, 1993	81 days	Clinton
25	Arthur Levitt	Arthur Levitt	New York	July 27, 1993	February 9, 2001	7 years, 227 days	Clinton
26	Harvey Pitt	Harvey Pitt	New York	August 3, 2001	February 18, 2003	1 year, 199 days	Bush Jr.
27	William H. Donaldson	William H. Donaldson	New York	February 18, 2003	June 30, 2005	2 years, 132 days	Bush Jr.
28	Christopher Cox	Christopher Cox	California	August 3, 2005	January 20, 2009	3 years, 170 days	Bush Jr.
29	Mary Schapiro	Mary Schapiro	New York	January 27, 2009	December 14, 2012	3 years, 322 days	Obama
30	Elisse B. Walter	Elisse B. Walter	New York	December 14, 2012	April 10, 2013	117 days	Obama
31	Mary Jo White	Mary Jo White	New York	April 10, 2013	January 20, 2017	3 years, 285 days	Obama
–	Michael Piwowar	Michael Piwowar (acting)	Washington D.C.	January 20, 2017	May 4, 2017	104 days	Trump
32	Jay Clayton (attorney)	Jay Clayton	New York	May 4, 2017	December 23, 2020	3 years, 233 days	Trump
–	Elad Roisman	Elad Roisman (acting)	Maine	December 24, 2020	January 20, 2021	27 days	Trump
–	Allison Lee	Allison Lee (acting)	Washington D.C.	January 20, 2021	April 17, 2021	87 days	Biden
33	Gary Gensler	Gary Gensler	Maryland	April 17, 2021	January 20, 2025	3 years, 278 days	Biden
–	Mark Uyeda	Mark Uyeda (acting)	California	January 20, 2025	April 21, 2025	91 days	Trump
34	Paul S. Atkins	Paul S. Atkins	Virginia	April 21, 2025	Present	1 year, 209 days	Trump

== Organizational structure ==
=== Commission members ===
The commission has five commissioners appointed by the president of the United States. No more than three commissioners may belong to the same political party. Their five-year terms are staggered so that one commissioner's term ends on June 5 each year. Service may continue for up to 18 additional months past term expiration.

The president also designates one commissioner as chairman, the SEC's top executive. However, the president does not possess the power to fire the appointed commissioners, a provision that was made to ensure the independence of the SEC. This issue arose during the 2008 financial crisis and the John McCain 2008 presidential campaign.

=== Current commissioners ===
The current board members as of October 2, 2026:

Position	Name	Party	Took office	Term expires
Chair	Paul S. Atkins	Republican	April 21, 2025	June 5, 2031
Member	Mark Uyeda	Republican	June 30, 2022	June 5, 2028
Member	Vacant	—N/a	—	June 5, 2027
Member	Vacant	—N/a	—	June 5, 2029
Member	Vacant	—N/a	—	June 5, 2030

=== Nominations ===
President Trump has nominated the following to fill a seat on the commission. They await Senate confirmation.

Name	Party	Term expires	Replacing
Kristin N. Johnson	Democratic	June 5, 2029	Caroline A. Crenshaw
Steven Levine	Republican	June 5, 2030	Hester Peirce

=== Divisions ===
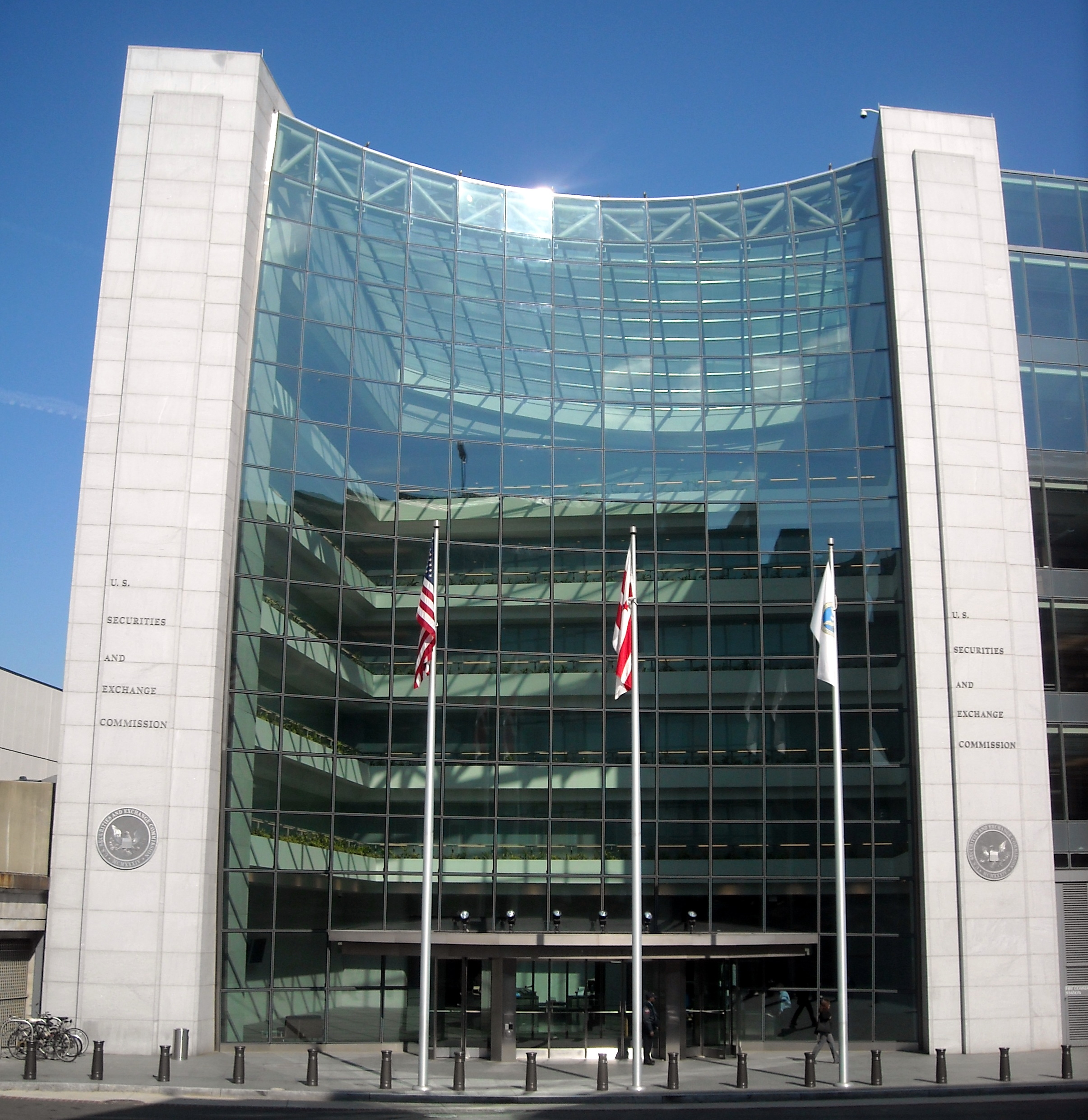
U.S. Securities and Exchange Commission headquarters in Washington, D.C., near Washington Union Station

Within the SEC, there are six divisions, which is headquartered in Washington, D.C.

The SEC's divisions are:

- Corporation Finance
- Trading and Markets
- Investment Management
- Enforcement
- Economic and Risk Analysis
- Examinations

Corporation Finance is the division that oversees the disclosure made by public companies, as well as the registration of transactions, such as mergers, made by companies. The division is also responsible for operating EDGAR.

The Trading and Markets division oversees self-regulatory organizations (SRO's) such as the Financial Industry Regulatory Authority (FINRA) and Municipal Securities Rulemaking Board (MSRB) and all broker-dealer firms and investment houses. This division also interprets proposed changes to regulations and monitors operations of the industry. In practice, the SEC delegates most of its enforcement and rulemaking authority to FINRA. In fact, all trading firms not regulated by other SROs must register as a member of FINRA. Individuals trading securities must pass exams administered by FINRA to become registered representatives.

The Investment Management Division oversees registered investment companies, which include mutual funds, as well as registered investment advisors. These entities are subject to extensive regulation under various federal securities laws. The Division of Investment Management administers various federal securities laws, in particular, the Investment Company Act of 1940 and Investment Advisers Act of 1940. This division's responsibilities include:

- assisting the commission in interpreting laws and regulations for the public and SEC inspection and enforcement staff;
- responding to no-action requests and requests for exemptive relief;
- reviewing investment company and investment adviser filings;
- assisting the commission in enforcement matters involving investment companies and advisers; and
- advising the commission on adapting SEC rules to new circumstances.

The Enforcement Division investigates violations of the securities laws and regulations to bring legal actions against alleged violators. It is the largest division in terms of both headcount and budget, and its resources have been increased by more than 50% since the 2008 financial crisis. The SEC can bring a civil action in a U.S. District Court, or an administrative proceeding which is heard by an independent administrative law judge (ALJ). The SEC does not have criminal authority but may refer matters to state and federal prosecutors.

The Economic and Risk Analysis Division (DERA) was created in September 2009 to integrate financial economics and rigorous data analytics into the core mission of the SEC. The division is involved across the entire range of SEC activities, including policy-making, rule-making, enforcement, and examination. As the agency's "think tank", DERA relies on a variety of academic disciplines, quantitative and non-quantitative approaches, and knowledge of market institutions and practices to help the commission approach complex matters in a fresh light. DERA also assists in the commission's efforts to identify, analyze, and respond to risks and trends, including those associated with new financial products and strategies. Through the range and nature of its activities, DERA serves the critical function of promoting collaborative efforts throughout the agency and breaking through silos that might otherwise limit the impact of the agency's institutional expertise. The division's activities include providing detailed, high-quality economic and statistical analyzes, and specific subject-matter expertise to the commission and other divisions/offices and developing customized, analytic tools and analyzes to proactively detect market risks indicative of possible violations of the federal securities laws. Using data, DERA staff create analytic programs designed to detect patterns identifying risks, enabling commission divisions and offices to deploy scarce resources targeting possible misconduct. DERA also houses the commission's chief economist.

The Division of Examinations conducts the SEC's National Exam Program. The division's mission is to protect investors, ensure market integrity and support responsible capital formation through risk-focused strategies that: (1) improve compliance; (2) prevent fraud; (3) monitor risk; and (4) inform policy. The results of the division's examinations are used by the SEC to inform rule-making initiatives, identify and monitor risks, improve industry practices and pursue misconduct.

=== Regional offices ===
There are 11 regional offices throughout the US, which are listed below along with the name of the respective regional director.

- Atlanta – Nekia Hackworth Jones
- Boston – Silvestre A. Fontes
- Chicago – Daniel Gregus
- Denver – Jason Burt
- Fort Worth – Eric R. Werner
- Los Angeles – Katharine Zoladz, J. Cindy Eson
- Miami – Eric I. Bustillo
- New York City – Antonia M. Apps
- Philadelphia – Nicholas P. Grippo
- Salt Lake City – Tracy S. Combs
- San Francisco – Monique Winkler

Among the SEC's offices are:

- The Office of General Counsel, which acts as the agency's "lawyer" before federal appellate courts and provides legal advice to the commission and other SEC divisions and offices;
- The Office of the Chief Accountant, which establishes and enforces accounting and auditing policies set by the SEC. This office has played a role in such areas as working with the Financial Accounting Standards Board to develop Generally Accepted Accounting Principles, the Public Company Accounting Oversight Board in developing audit requirements, and the International Accounting Standards Board in advancing the development of International Financial Reporting Standards;
- The Office of Compliance, Inspections and Examinations, which inspects broker-dealers, stock exchanges, credit rating agencies, registered investment companies, including both closed-end and open-end (mutual funds) investment companies, money funds. and Registered Investment Advisors;
- The Office of International Affairs, which represents the SEC abroad and which negotiates international enforcement information-sharing agreements, develops the SEC's international regulatory policies in areas such as mutual recognition, and helps develop international regulatory standards through organizations such as the International Organization of Securities Commissions and the Financial Stability Forum; and
- The Office of Information Technology, which supports the commission and staff in information technology, including application development, infrastructure operations. and engineering, user support, IT program management, capital planning, security, and enterprise architecture.
- The Inspector General. The SEC announced in January 2013 that it had named Carl Hoecker the new inspector general. He has a staff of 22.
- The SEC Office of the Whistleblower provides assistance and information from a whistleblower who knows of possible securities law violations: this can be among the most powerful weapons in the law enforcement arsenal of the Securities and Exchange Commission. Created by Section 922 of the Dodd-Frank Wall Street Reform and Consumer Protection Act Dodd–Frank Wall Street Reform and Consumer Protection Act amended the Securities Exchange Act of 1934 (the "Exchange Act") by, among other things, adding Section 21F, entitled "Securities Whistleblower Incentives and Protection". Section 21F directs the commission to make monetary awards to eligible individuals who voluntarily provide original information that leads to successful commission enforcement actions resulting in the imposition of monetary sanctions over $1,000,000, and certain successful related actions.

== Communications ==
=== Comment letters ===
Comment letters are issued by the SEC's Division of Corporation Finance in response to a company's public filing. This letter, initially private, contains an itemized list of requests from the SEC. Each comment in the letter asks the filer to provide additional information, modify their submitted filing, or change the way they disclose in future filings. The filer must reply to each item in the comment letter. The SEC may then reply back with follow-up comments. This correspondence is later made public.

In October 2001 the SEC wrote to CA, Inc., covering 15 items, mostly about CA's accounting, including 5 about revenue recognition. The chief executive officer of CA, to whom the letter was addressed, pleaded guilty to fraud at CA in 2004.

In June 2004, the SEC announced that it would publicly post all comment letters, to give investors access to the information in them. An analysis of regulatory filings in May 2006 over the prior 12 months indicated, that the SEC had not accomplished what it said it would do. The analysis found 212 companies that had reported receiving comment letters from the SEC, but only 21 letters for these companies were posted on the SEC's website. John W. White, the head of the Division of Corporation Finance, told the New York Times in 2006: "We have now resolved the hurdles of posting the information... We expect a significant number of new postings in the coming months."

=== No-action letters ===
No-action letters are letters by the SEC staff indicating that the staff will not recommend to the commission that the SEC undertake enforcement action against a person or company if that entity engages in a particular action. These letters are sent in response to requests made when the legal status of an activity is not clear. These letters are publicly released and increase the body of knowledge on what exactly is and is not allowed. They represent the staff's interpretations of the securities laws and, while persuasive, are not binding on the courts.

One such use, from 1975 to 2007, was with the nationally recognized statistical rating organization (NRSRO), a credit rating agency that issues credit ratings that the SEC permits other financial firms to use for certain regulatory purposes.

== Freedom of Information Act processing performance ==
In the latest Center for Effective Government analysis of 15 federal agencies which receive the most Freedom of Information Act (FOIA) requests published in 2015 (using 2012 and 2013 data, the most recent years available), the SEC was among the 5 lowest performers, earned a D− by scoring 61 out of a possible 100 points, i.e. did not earn a satisfactory overall grade. It had deteriorated from a D− in 2013.

== Operations ==
=== List of major SEC enforcement actions (2009–12) ===
The SEC's Enforcement Division took a number of major actions in 2009–12.

=== Regulatory action in the credit crunch ===
The SEC announced on September 17, 2008, strict new rules to prohibit all forms of "naked short selling" as a measure to reduce volatility in turbulent markets.

The SEC investigated cases involving individuals attempting to manipulate the market by passing false rumors about certain financial institutions. The commission has also investigated trading irregularities and abusive short-selling practices. Hedge fund managers, broker-dealers, and institutional investors were also asked to disclose under oath certain information pertaining to their positions in credit default swaps. The commission also negotiated the largest settlements in the history of the SEC (approximately $51 billion in all) on behalf of investors who purchased auction rate securities from six different financial institutions.

=== Regulatory failures ===
The SEC has been criticized "for being too 'tentative and fearful' in confronting wrongdoing on Wall Street", and for doing "an especially poor job of holding executives accountable".

Christopher Cox, the former SEC chairman, has recognized the organization's multiple failures in relation to the Bernard Madoff fraud. Starting with an investigation in 1992 into a Madoff feeder fund that only invested with Madoff, and which, according to the SEC, promised "curiously steady" returns, the SEC did not investigate indications that something was amiss in Madoff's investment firm. The SEC has been accused of missing numerous red flags and ignoring tips on Madoff's alleged fraud.

As a result, Cox said that an investigation would ensue into "all staff contact and relationships with the Madoff family and firm, and their impact, if any, on decisions by staff regarding the firm". SEC assistant director of the Office of Compliance Investigations Eric Swanson had met Madoff's niece, Shana Madoff, when Swanson was conducting an SEC examination of whether Bernard Madoff was running a Ponzi scheme because she was the firm's compliance attorney. The investigation was closed, and Swanson subsequently left the SEC, and married Shana Madoff.

Approximately 45% of institutional investors thought that better oversight by the SEC could have prevented the Madoff fraud. Harry Markopolos complained to the SEC's Boston office in 2000, telling the SEC staff they should investigate Madoff because it was impossible to legally make the profits Madoff claimed using the investment strategies that he said he used.

In June 2010, the SEC settled a wrongful termination lawsuit with former SEC enforcement lawyer Gary J. Aguirre, who was terminated in September 2005 following his attempt to subpoena Wall Street figure John J. Mack in an insider trading case involving hedge fund Pequot Capital Management; Mary Jo White, who later served as chair of the SEC, was at the time representing Morgan Stanley and was involved in this case. While the insider case was dropped at the time, a month prior to the SEC's settlement with Aguirre the SEC filed charges against Pequot. The Senate released a report in August 2007 detailing the issue and calling for reform of the SEC.

On September 26, 2016, Democratic senator Mark Warner sent a letter to the SEC, asking them to evaluate whether the current disclosure regime was adequate, citing the low number of companies' disclosures to date.

==== Inspector General office failures ====
In 2009, the Project on Government Oversight, a government watchdog group, sent a letter to Congress criticizing the SEC for failing to implement more than half of the recommendations made to it by its Inspector General. According to POGO, in the prior two years, the SEC had taken no action on 27 out of 52 recommended reforms suggested in Inspector General reports, and still had a "pending" status on 197 of the 312 recommendations made in audit reports. Some of the recommendations included imposing disciplinary action on SEC employees who receive improper gifts or other favors from financial companies, and investigating and reporting the causes of the failures to detect the Madoff ponzi scheme.

In a 2011 article by Matt Taibbi in Rolling Stone, former SEC employees were interviewed and commented negatively on the SEC's Office of the Inspector General (OIG). Going to the OIG was "well-known to be a career-killer".

Because of concerns raised by David P. Weber, former SEC chief investigator, regarding conduct by SEC inspector general H. David Kotz, Inspector General David C. Williams of the U.S. Postal Service was brought in to conduct an independent, outside review of Kotz's alleged improper conduct in 2012. Williams concluded in his 66-page Report that Kotz violated ethics rules by overseeing probes that involved people with whom he had conflicts of interest due to "personal relationships". The report questioned Kotz's work on the Madoff investigation, among others, because Kotz was a "very good friend" with Markopolos. It concluded that while it was unclear when Kotz and Markopolos became friends, it would have violated U.S. ethics rules if their relationship began before or during Kotz's Madoff investigation. The report also found that Kotz himself "appeared to have a conflict of interest" and should not have opened his Standford investigation, because he was friends with a female attorney who represented victims of the fraud.

==== Destruction of documents ====
According to former SEC employee and whistleblower Darcy Flynn, also reported by Taibbi, the agency routinely destroyed thousands of documents related to preliminary investigations of alleged crimes committed by Deutsche Bank, Goldman Sachs, Lehman Brothers, SAC Capital, and other financial companies involved in the Great Recession that the SEC was supposed to have been regulating. The documents included those relating to "Matters Under Inquiry", or MUI, the name the SEC gives to the first stages of the investigation process. The tradition of destruction began as early as the 1990s. This SEC activity eventually caused a conflict with the National Archives and Records Administration when it was revealed to them in 2010 by Flynn. Flynn also described a meeting at the SEC in which top staff discussed refusing to admit the destruction had taken place, because it was possibly illegal.

Iowa Republican senator Charles Grassley, among others, took note of Flynn's call for protection as a whistleblower, and the story of the agency's document-handling procedures. The SEC issued a statement defending its procedures. NPR quoted University of Denver Sturm College of Law professor Jay Brown as saying: "My initial take on this is it's a tempest in a teapot," and Jacob Frenkel, a securities lawyer in the Washington, D.C., area, as saying in effect "there's no allegation the SEC tossed sensitive documents from banks it got under subpoena in high-profile cases that investors and lawmakers care about". NPR concluded its report:

The debate boils down to this: What does an investigative record mean to Congress? And the courts? Under the law, those investigative records must be kept for 25 years. But federal officials say no judge has ruled that papers related to early-stage SEC inquiries are investigative records. The SEC's inspector general says he's conducting a thorough investigation into the allegations. [Kotz] tells NPR that he'll issue a report by the end of September.

==== SEC and cryptocurrency ====
On June 5, 2023, the SEC filed 13 charges against Binance entities and its founder Changpeng Zhao, citing allegations of mishandling customer funds and operating without proper registration. The following day, the SEC charged Coinbase for operating as an unregistered securities exchange, broker, and clearing agency, further signaling its intensified scrutiny of major players in the industry.

A key point of contention between the SEC and the crypto industry lies in defining what constitutes a security. The SEC applies the Howey Test, derived from a 1946 U.S. Supreme Court decision, which defines a security as "an investment of money in a common enterprise with profits to come solely from the efforts of others". The agency has classified many crypto assets as securities based on this test, asserting that their value often depends on the efforts of developers or other central parties behind blockchain projects. Critics argue that the test is outdated and ill-suited to the decentralized nature of cryptocurrencies, leaving regulatory definitions unclear and fostering uncertainty. Research by economists found that unpredictable SEC enforcement actions under Gensler, classifying cryptocurrencies as securities without clear guidelines, caused prolonged destabilization in crypto markets. Unclear guidelines raise doubts about the agency's ability to maintain fair and orderly markets.

In December 2025, the Securities and Exchange Commission provided the Depository Trust & Clearing Corporation (DTCC) with a no-action letter that allows the organization to hold and record tokenized equities and other real-world assets on blockchain networks. The authorization enables DTCC to deliver tokenization-related services on approved blockchains for a period of three years.

SEC and Cybersecurity Risk

On July 26, 2023, the SEC adopted the Cybersecurity Risk Management, Strategy, Governance, and Incident Disclosure rule to encourage public companies to more transparently and effectively manage and disclose cybersecurity risk. However, according to a CIO analysis of a proposed AI disclosure rule and its connection to the earlier cybersecurity disclosure regime, some experts argue that the cybersecurity rule’s broad, materiality-based thresholds and reliance on company-defined terms create challenges for consistent reporting, as many disclosures have resorted to boilerplate language and offered limited investor insight.

==== Climate disclosure rule ====
In 2024, the SEC decided on a climate disclosure rule, The Enhancement and Standardization of Climate-Related Disclosures for Investors. It requires companies to disclose information on their risk to be impacted by climate change and a company's risks to profit by a growing number of climate change regulations, concerning direct and indirect greenhouse gas emissions produced.

==== Consolidated Audit Trail ====
The Consolidated Audit Trail, or CAT, is an SEC-mandated reporting system that collects data regarding trading in the U.S. equities and options markets. The SEC first proposed CAT in 2010 when the limitations of pre-CAT reporting facilities were highlighted by the Flash Crash.2 The final CAT rule was adopted by the SEC in 2012, a more detailed plan for CAT was approved by the SEC in 2016, and reporting into CAT was implemented in phases from 2018 to 2024.

On July 11, 2012, the U.S. Securities and Exchange Commission (SEC) voted to adopt Rule 613 under Regulation NMS requiring the national securities exchanges and national securities associations listed below (collectively, the SROs) to submit an NMS plan (Plan) to the SEC to create, implement, and maintain a consolidated audit trail (CAT).

CAT participants and Consolidated Audit Trail, LLC operating committee members: BOX Exchange LLC, Investors’ Exchange, Nasdaq ISE, Cboe Exchange, LTSE, Nasdaq MRX, Cboe BYX Exchange, MEMX, Nasdaq PHLX, Cboe BZX Exchange, Miami International Securities Exchange, New York Stock Exchange, Cboe C2 Exchange, MIAX Emerald, NYSE Arca, Cboe EDGA Exchange, MIAX PEARL, NYSE American, Cboe EDGX Exchange, MIAX Sapphire, NYSE Texas, FINRA, The Nasdaq Stock Market, NYSE National, Nasdaq Texas, 24X National Exchange, Nasdaq GEMX.

In creating a Consolidated Audit Trail (CAT) pursuant to SEC Rule 613, the SROs have developed the following Guiding Principles: The CAT must meet the specific requirements of Rule 613 and achieve the primary goal of creating a single, comprehensive audit trail to enhance regulators’ ability to surveil the U.S. markets in an effective and efficient way. The reporting requirements and technology infrastructure developed must be adaptable to changing market structures and reflective of trading practices, as well as scalable to increasing market volumes. The costs of developing, implementing, and operating the CAT should be minimized to the extent possible. To this end, existing reporting structures and technology interfaces will be utilized where practicable. Industry input is a critical component in the creation of the CAT. The SROs will consider industry feedback before decisions are made with respect to reporting requirements and cost allocation models.

How is the Consolidated Audit Trail, LLC managed? The CAT NMS Plan provides that the Consolidated Audit Trail, LLC will be managed by its Operating Committee. Each Participant appoints one member of the Operating Committee and each Participant appointee has one vote. The CAT NMS Plan sets forth certain provisions relating to the Operating Committee, including identification of those actions requiring a Majority Vote, a Supermajority Vote or a unanimous vote, and the management of conflicts of interest.

CAT represents a huge privacy risk to all clients of American broker dealer firms. https://www.finra.org/media-center/blog/cat-should-be-modified-to-cease-collecting-personal-information-on-retail-investors https://www.americansecurities.org/post/asa-urges-secretary-bessent-to-end-cat-s-use-of-american-investor-personal-information-in-wake-of-an

== Whistleblower program ==
The SEC runs a whistleblower rewards program, which rewards individuals who report violations of securities laws to the SEC. The program began in 2011 with the passage of the Dodd-Frank Wall Street Reform and Consumer Protection Act and allows whistleblowers to be given 10–30% of the penalties collected by the SEC and other agencies as a result of the whistleblower's information. In fiscal year 2025, the SEC granted more than $60 million in awards to 48 individual whistleblowers. The agency separately reported paying $171 million to whistleblowers during that fiscal year; awards granted and payments made are distinct accounting measures.

== Relationship to other agencies ==
In addition to working with various self-regulatory organizations such as the Financial Industry Regulatory Authority (FINRA), the Securities Investor Protection Corporation (SIPC), and Municipal Securities Rulemaking Board (MSRB), the SEC also works with federal agencies, state securities regulators, international securities agencies and law enforcement agencies. The SEC is statutorily required by the Securities Act of 1933 to meet with state securities regulators annually in what has become known as the "Section 19(d) conference" referencing the portion of the law the calls for it. The meeting is jointly organized by the SEC and the North American Securities Administrators Association (NASAA), a membership organization made up of the state securities regulators.

In 1988, Executive Order 12631 established the president's Working Group on Financial Markets. The Working Group is chaired by the secretary of the treasury and includes the chairman of the SEC, the chairman of the Federal Reserve and the chairman of the Commodity Futures Trading Commission. The goal of the Working Group is to enhance the integrity, efficiency, orderliness, and competitiveness of the financial markets while maintaining investor confidence.

The Securities Act of 1933 was originally administered by the Federal Trade Commission. The Securities Exchange Act of 1934 transferred this responsibility from the FTC to the SEC. The Securities Exchange Act of 1934 also gave the SEC the power to regulate the solicitation of proxies, though some of the rules the SEC has since proposed (like the universal proxy) have been controversial. The main mission of the FTC is to promote consumer protection and to eradicate anti-competitive business practices. The FTC regulates general business practices, while the SEC focuses on the securities markets.

The Temporary National Economic Committee was established by joint resolution of Congress 52 Stat. 705 on June 16, 1938. It was in charge of reporting to Congress on abuses of monopoly power. The committee was defunded in 1941, but its records are still under seal by order of the SEC.

The Municipal Securities Rulemaking Board (MSRB) was established in 1975 by Congress to develop rules for companies involved in underwriting and trading municipal securities. The MSRB is monitored by the SEC, but the MSRB does not have the authority to enforce its rules.

The Asset Management Advisory Committee (AMAC) was formally established on 1 November 2019, to provide the SEC with "diverse perspectives on asset management and related advice and recommendations". Topics the committee may address include trends and developments affecting investors and market participants, the effects of globalization, and changes in the role of technology and service providers. The committee is composed of outside experts, including individuals representing the views of retail and institutional investors, small and large funds, intermediaries, and other market participants.

While most violations of securities laws are enforced by the SEC and the various SROs it monitors, state securities regulators can also enforce statewide securities blue sky laws. States may require securities to be registered in the state before they can be sold there. National Securities Markets Improvement Act of 1996 (NSMIA) addressed this dual system of federal-state regulation by amending Section 18 of the 1933 Act to exempt nationally traded securities from state registration, thereby pre-empting state law in this area. However, NSMIA preserves the states' anti-fraud authority over all securities traded in the state.

The SEC also works with federal and state law enforcement agencies to carry out actions against actors alleged to be in violation of the securities laws.

The SEC is a member of International Organization of Securities Commissions (IOSCO), and uses the IOSCO Multilateral Memorandum of Understanding as well as direct bilateral agreements with other countries' securities commissions to deal with cross-border misconduct in securities markets.

== Related legislation ==
- 1933: Securities Act of 1933
- 1934: Securities Exchange Act of 1934
- 1938: Temporary National Economic Committee (establishment)
- 1939: Trust Indenture Act of 1939
- 1940: Investment Advisers Act of 1940
- 1940: Investment Company Act of 1940
- 1968: Williams Act (Securities Disclosure Act)
- 1982: Garn–St. Germain Depository Institutions Act
- 1999: Gramm–Leach–Bliley Act
- 2000: Commodity Futures Modernization Act of 2000
- 2002: Sarbanes–Oxley Act
- 2003: Fair and Accurate Credit Transactions Act of 2003
- 2006: Credit Rating Agency Reform Act of 2006
- 2010: Dodd–Frank Wall Street Reform and Consumer Protection Act
- 2012: Volcker Rule (a specific section of the Dodd–Frank Act)
- 2020: Holding Foreign Companies Accountable Act
- Title 17 of the Code of Federal Regulations
- 2023: SEC Cybersecurity Rules: Cybersecurity Risk Management, Strategy, Governance, and Incident Disclosure by Public Companies

== See also ==
- Financial regulation
- Financial risk management
- NYSE Chicago
- Regulation D (SEC)
- Regulatory capture
- Risk management
- Securities market participants (United States)
- United States securities regulation
- List of financial supervisory authorities by country

=== Forms ===
- SEC filing
  - Form 4 (stock and stock options ownership and exercise disclosure)
  - Form 8-K
  - Form 10-K
  - Form 10-Q
  - Form S-1 (IPO)
