= Mark Uyeda =

American government official

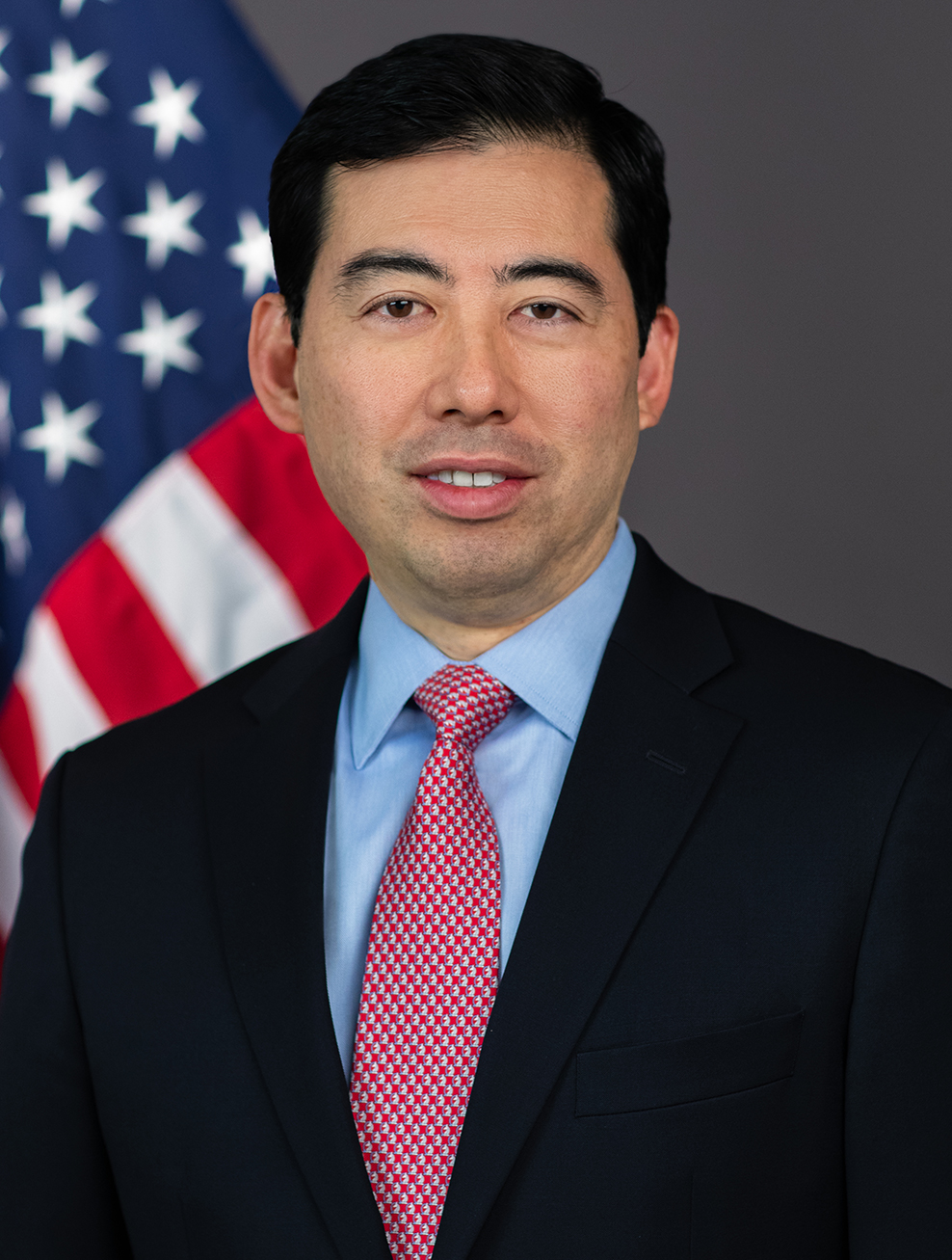
- Official portrait, 2022

Chair of the U.S. Securities and Exchange Commission
- Acting
- In office January 20, 2025 – April 21, 2025
- President: Donald Trump
- Preceded by: Gary Gensler
- Succeeded by: Paul S. Atkins

Commissioner of the U.S. Securities and Exchange Commission
- Incumbent
- Assumed office June 30, 2022
- President: Joe Biden; Donald Trump
- Preceded by: Elad L. Roisman

Personal details
- Born: Mark Toshiro Uyeda
- Party: Republican
- Education: Georgetown University (BS); Duke University (JD)

Mark Toshiro Uyeda (Japanese: 上田 俊郎, born 1970) is an American attorney and government official. A member of the Republican Party, Uyeda has served as a Commissioner of the U.S. Securities and Exchange Commission (SEC) since June 30, 2022. Before becoming an SEC Commissioner, Uyeda served on the staff of the SEC for more than 15 years. He is the first Asian Pacific American to serve as a Commissioner of the SEC.

Uyeda was appointed acting chair of the SEC by President Donald Trump in 2025. During his tenure as chair, the SEC did not launch any new enforcement against cryptocurrency firms, while dismissing active cases against cryptocurrency firms. One of the cases that the SEC dropped was the fraud investigation into Binance, a company with substantial ties to the Trump family's businesses.

== Early life and education ==
Uyeda was born to a Japanese American family. His grandfather Mac Yukihiro, ran the family business, Yukihiro Produce, in Westminster, California. Uyeda stated his grandfather and mother were interned due to Executive Order 9066, which forced him to rebuild his business.

Uyeda graduated from Georgetown University with a bachelor of science degree in business administration in 1992. He later received his Juris Doctor degree from the Duke University School of Law. As a law student, Uyeda was the notes editor for the Duke Law Journal.

== Legal career ==
From 1995 to 1996, Uyeda worked as an associate at K&L Gates. He later became an associate at O'Melveny & Myers in Los Angeles, where he worked from 1997 to 2004. From 2004 to 2006, he served as a senior advisor to the commissioner of the California Department of Corporations.

In 2006, he became an attorney and advisor at the U.S. Securities and Exchange Commission (SEC). Prior to serving as a commissioner, Uyeda was a staffer for SEC commissioner Michael Piwowar and worked for SEC chair Jay Clayton. He has also worked on detail as a Republican staffer for the United States Senate Committee on Banking, Housing, and Urban Affairs.

== Commissioner of the U.S. Securities and Exchange Commission (SEC) ==
In April 2022, President Joe Biden nominated Uyeda to fill a vacant seat on the SEC left formerly held by Elad Roisman. His nomination was supported by Senator Pat Toomey (R-PA), who signed a letter of recommendation in his favor.

On June 16, 2022, both Uyeda and Democratic SEC nominee Jaime Lizárraga were confirmed by the U.S. Senate. Alongside Hester Peirce, Uyeda is one of two Republicans on the five member body. Uyeda's confirmation made him the first Asian American to serve as an SEC commissioner. Since taking office, Uyeda has expressed concerns about the viability of thirty-day comment periods. On June 2, 2023, President Biden announced his intent to nominate Uyeda to a second term. On June 6, 2023, his nomination was sent to the Senate. On October 19, 2023, a hearing on his nomination was held before the Senate Banking, Housing, and Urban Affairs Committee. On November 7, his nomination was reported favorably out of committee by voice vote. On December 20, 2023, his nomination was confirmed in the Senate by voice vote. He was sworn in for a second term on January 3, 2024.

=== Acting chair ===
After Donald Trump was sworn in as president for a second time in 2025, Trump appointed Uyeda as acting chair of the SEC. Trump had pledged to the cryptocurrency industry during the 2024 election that he would fire SEC chair Gary Gensler who had undertaken enforcement efforts against cryptocurrency firms. Uyeda was known as a critic of the SEC's enforcement efforts against cryptocurrency firms. After his appointment as chair, Uyeda appointed Hester Peirce, a critic of many regulatory efforts against cryptocurrency firms, as head of the SEC's crypto task force. During Uyeda's tenure, the SEC did not launch any new enforcement against cryptocurrency firms, while dismissing active cases against cryptocurrency firms. Rather than leave decisions on cases to the SEC's enforcement lawyers, as is common practice, Uyeda's staff involved themselves in the SEC's active cases. One of the cases that the SEC dropped was the fraud investigation into Binance, a company with substantial ties to the Trump family's businesses.

In May 2026, Uyeda directed the SEC to stop defending a rule in court that required that all publicly traded companies disclose their contributions to climate change and the risk that the companies' operations face from climate change. The rule was opposed by the U.S. Chamber of Commerce and Attorneys general from 25 Republican-controlled states.
