= Hamilton Lane =

American investment firm

Hamilton Lane Incorporated
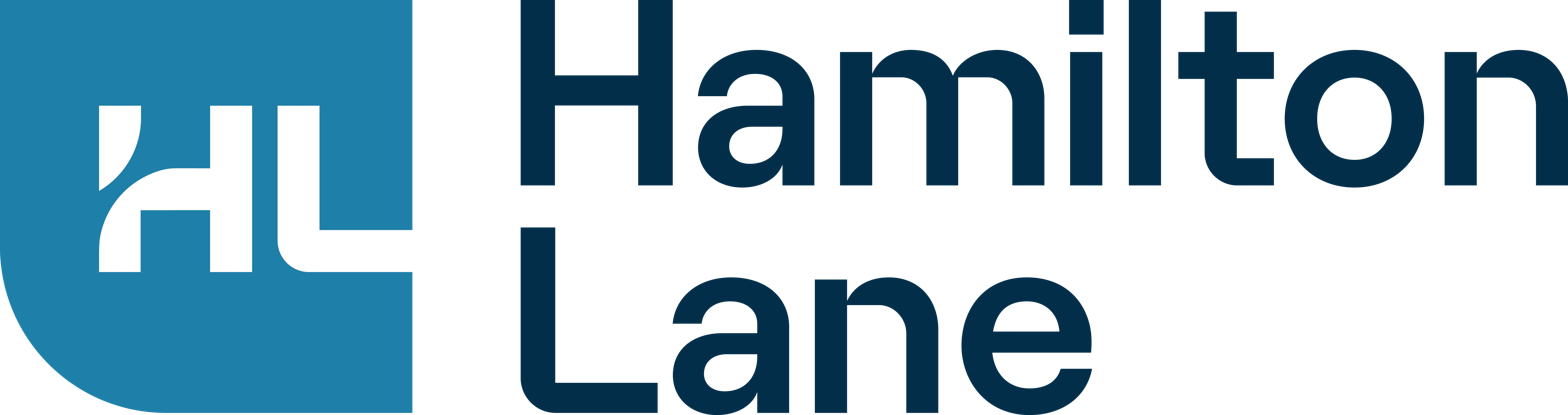
- Type: Public
- Traded as: Nasdaq: HLNE (Class A); S&P 400 component
- Industry: Financial services
- Founded: 1991; 35 years ago
- Founder: Leslie Brun
- Headquarters: Conshohocken, Pennsylvania, U.S.
- Key people: Hartley R. Rogers (chairman); Mario Giannini (CEO)
- Products: Private equity; Secondaries; Equity co-investment; Growth equity; Venture capital; Private credit; Real assets
- Revenue: ▲US$451.94 million (2024)
- Net income: ▲US$227.21 million (2024)
- AUM: ▲US$947.70 billion (under management and supervision) (November 2024)
- Total assets: ▲US$1.27 billion (2024)
- Total equity: ▲US$675.96 million (2024)
- Number of employees: 700 (2024)
- Website: hamiltonlane.com

Hamilton Lane Incorporated is an American alternative investment management and advisory company headquartered in Conshohocken, Pennsylvania. The company provides private markets investments to its clients. The company has 22 offices globally and has offices in North America, Europe, the Middle East and Asia-Pacific.

== Background ==
Hamilton Lane was founded in 1991 by Leslie Brun. It was originally formed as a private equity advisory firm for large public pension plans.

In 1998, the company added separately managed account and fund of funds investment management services. On November 18, 2004, Hamilton Lane acquired The Richcourt Group, a fund of hedge funds manager from Citco, and the company continued to expand its product offerings and services.

In 2000, Crédit Lyonnais acquired a 24.9% stake in Hamilton Lane. In December 2003, Hamilton Lane sold 40% of the company to a group of outside investors which included Hartley Rogers (who is now the company's chairman) and Cascade Investment. In May 2006, another investor group which included Rogers, Cascade Investment and Credit Agricole (who had acquired Crédit Lyonnais in 2003), acquired Brun's 12% stake in Hamilton Lane. In February 2012, Hamilton Lane used a $165 million senior secured loan from Goldman Sachs to buy back Credit Agricole's stake in the company.In July 2015, Hamilton Lane bought back Cascade Investment's stake in the company making it majority employee-owned again.

On February 2, 2013, Hamilton Lane acquired Shott Capital Management, a San Francisco-based separate accounts manager and provider of distribution management services. In December 2013, Hamilton Lane announced its intention to acquire Paul Capital. However, by February 2014, Hamilton Lane dropped interest in the acquisition after a series of negotiations.

On March 1, 2017, Hamilton Lane held its initial public offering becoming a listed company on the Nasdaq and raising $200 million. It was priced at $16 on its debut and closed 12.6% up at end of first day of trading. On June 20, 2017. Hamilton Lane acquired Real Asset Portfolio Management LLC, a Portland-based real assets investment and consulting firm. On January 28, 2021, Hamilton Lane acquired 361 Capita, a Denver-based long/short equity fund manager. On March 30, 2021, Hamilton Lane acquired a $90 million stake in Russell Investments. In October 2022, Hamilton Lane announced it would tokenize three of its funds in a partnership with Securitize, Inc. using the Polygon blockchain.

In October 2024, Hamilton Lane Launched two evergreen infrastructure funds - Global Private Infrastructure Fund (for EMEA, APAC, LatAm) and U.S. Private Infrastructure Fund, growing the firm’s evergreen strategy to about $17.1 billion AUM. Most of the company's business involve providing investment advisory services to its clients by helping develop and implement their private markets investment programs. However, the company also performs direct investments in assets classes such as private equity, private credit and real assets.
