= James M. McDonald =

American attorney (born 1982)

United States Attorney for the Southern District of New York
- Incumbent
- Assumed office July 29, 2026
- President: Donald Trump
- Preceded by: Jay Clayton

Personal details
- Born: James Michael McDonald; 1982 (age 43–44)
- Spouse: Maria Carlo (m. 2014)
- Education: Harvard University (BA); University of Virginia (JD)

James Michael McDonald (born 1982) is an American attorney who has served as the United States attorney for the Southern District of New York since 2026.

== Early life and education (1982–2007) ==
James Michael McDonald was born in 1982. McDonald's father was a founding partner at McDonald, McCann, Metcalf & Carwile, a law firm in Tulsa, Oklahoma. McDonald graduated from Booker T. Washington High School in Tulsa in 2000. He graduated from Harvard University and from the University of Virginia School of Law with a Juris Doctor.

== Career ==
=== Early work (2009–2014) ===
McDonald clerked for Chief Justice John Roberts from 2009 to 2010. He worked in the Office of White House Counsel as the deputy associate counsel in the Bush administration and as an associate at Williams & Connolly. In February 2014, McDonald married Maria Isabel Carlo in San Juan, Puerto Rico.

=== Assistant U.S. attorney (2014–2017) ===
In 2014, McDonald became an assistant U.S. attorney in the U.S. Attorney's Office for the Southern District of New York. He was involved in the prosecution of former New York State Assembly speaker Sheldon Silver.

=== Commodity Futures Trading Commission (2017–2020) ===
In March 2017, J. Christopher Giancarlo, the acting chair of the Commodity Futures Trading Commission, named McDonald as the director of the commission's enforcement division. He began serving in the position the following month. As the director, McDonald led the commission's first non-prosecution agreements and indicated that he intended to intensify their use. He resigned in October 2020.

=== Sullivan & Cromwell (2021–present) ===
In December 2020, Sullivan & Cromwell announced that it had hired McDonald to work on securities, commodities, and derivatives enforcement. He began serving in the position the following month. After FTX, a cryptocurrency exchange, declared bankruptcy, the company hired McDonald and Steven Peikin, the former co-director of the Securities and Exchange Commission's enforcement division, to investigate its collapse. In April 2023, Coinbase hired several former federal officials, including McDonald, in its defense against a lawsuit by the Securities and Exchange Commission. McDonald served as one of President Donald Trump's personal lawyers in his appeal to overturn his conviction in the hush-money case. He additionally represented Live Nation, Polymarket, and the billionaire Gautam Adani.

== U.S. Attorney for the Southern District of New York ==
After Donald Trump announced that he would nominate Jay Clayton, the U.S. attorney for the Southern District of New York, as the director of national intelligence in June 2026, McDonald was among several possible candidates to succeed Clayton. On June 13, Trump announced that he would appoint McDonald to serve as the U.S. attorney for the Southern District of New York. On July 8, Clayton appointed McDonald to serve as his deputy. On July 29, judges in the District Court for the Southern District of New York voted to appoint McDonald to succeed Clayton.
