= Paul S. Atkins =

American businessman

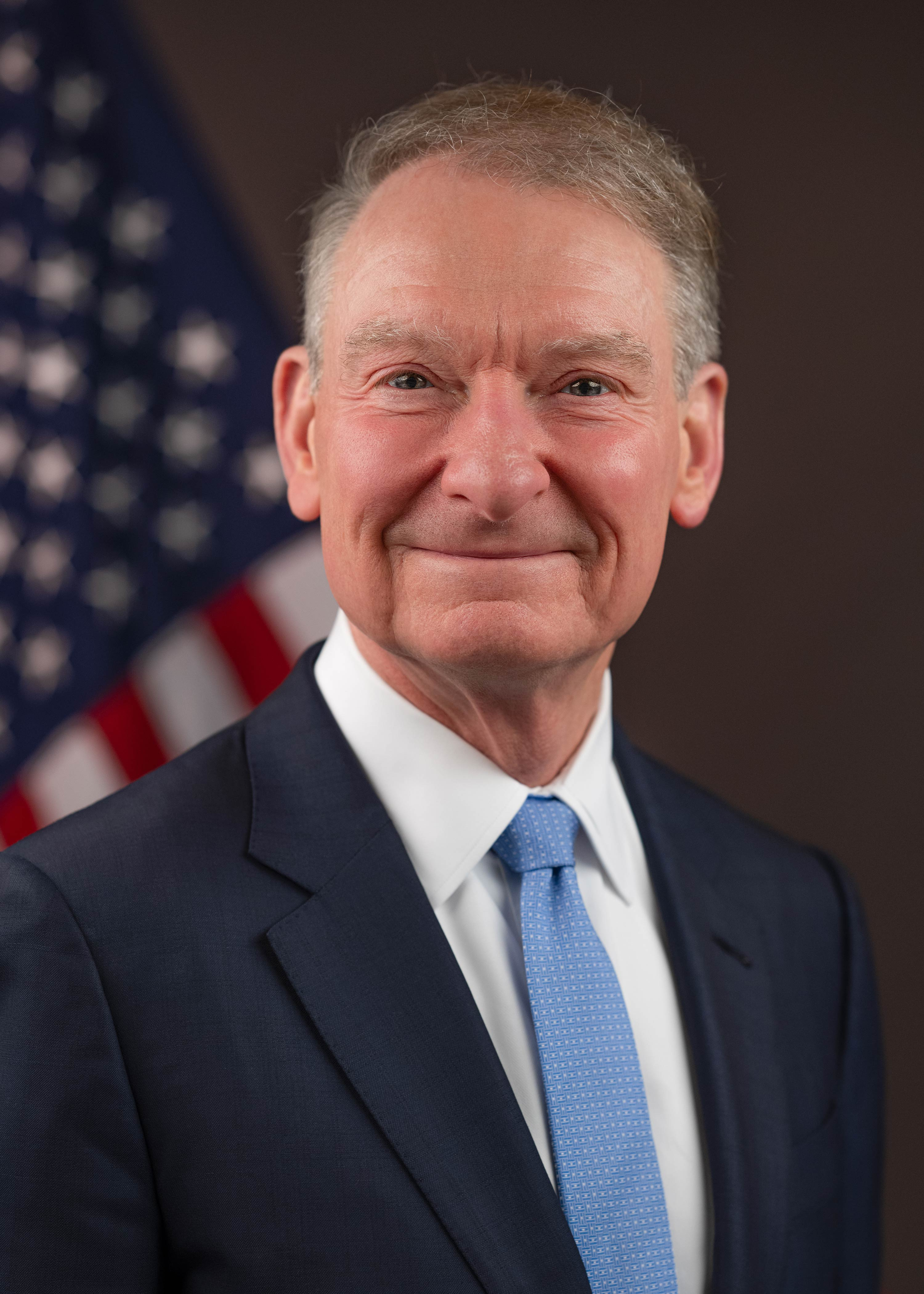
- Official portrait, 2025

34th Chair of the Securities and Exchange Commission
- Incumbent
- Assumed office April 21, 2025
- President: Donald Trump
- Preceded by: Mark Uyeda (acting)

Commissioner of the U.S. Securities and Exchange Commission
- Incumbent
- Assumed office April 21, 2025
- Appointed by: Donald Trump
- Preceded by: Gary Gensler
- In office August 8, 2002 – August 1, 2008
- Appointed by: George W. Bush
- Preceded by: Laura Unger
- Succeeded by: Troy A. Paredes

Personal details
- Born: Paul Stewart Atkins Lillington, North Carolina, U.S.
- Party: Republican
- Education: Wofford College (BA); Vanderbilt University (JD)

Paul Stewart Atkins is an American businessman and lawyer who is chair of the U.S. Securities and Exchange Commission (SEC) since April 2025. Atkins was a commissioner at the SEC from 2002 to 2008. He is known for advocating reduced regulatory burdens. Prior to his appointment, he worked as an advocate for the cryptocurrency industry.

== Early life and education ==
Originally from Lillington, North Carolina, Atkins grew up in Tampa, Florida. He received his A.B. from Wofford College in 1980 and was a member of Phi Beta Kappa and Kappa Alpha Order.

== Career ==
Atkins began his career as a lawyer in New York City with Davis Polk & Wardwell, focusing on a wide range of corporate transactions for U.S. and foreign clients, including public and private securities offerings and mergers and acquisitions. He worked in the Paris office for two and a half years, and in 1988 was admitted to provide legal advice in France.

Atkins was a commissioner of the U.S. Securities and Exchange Commission (SEC) from July 9, 2002 until his term's completion in August 2008. He served with chairmen Harvey Pitt, William H. Donaldson, and Christopher Cox.

In 2009, Atkins founded Patomak Global Partners, a financial services firm specializing in regulatory compliance and whose clients would come to include Fidelity Investments, Goldman Sachs, and the US Chamber of Commerce.

In December 2016, Atkins joined a business forum assembled by President-elect Trump to provide strategic and policy advice on economic issues.

Atkins was co-chair of the Token Alliance, a cryptocurrency advocacy group for the Chamber of Digital Commerce. He also served on the advisory board of Securitize, Inc., a cryptocurrency firm.

=== Chairman of the Securities and Exchange Commission ===
In December 2024, Atkins was nominated by President-elect Trump to be chairman of the Securities and Exchange Commission. He was sworn in on April 21, 2025.

In July 2025, Atkins sold his stake in Patomak Global Partners to an undisclosed buyer for between $25 million and $50 million.

In September 2025, Atkins affirmed plans to reduce reporting requirements for public companies in the United States, changing reporting timelines from quarterly to every six months. He expanded upon those plans in December at an SEC sponsored event, "Revitalizing American Markets" in honor of the Nation's 250th anniversary.

At the time of his appointment to the SEC, Atkins owned $6 million worth of holdings in crypto-related businesses. During his confirmation, he pledged to divest from these crypto-related businesses. He has since then filed paperwork listing millions dollars worth of investments he sold, but those lists did not include the crypto-related businesses. During his time at the SEC, the SEC has dropped or settled numerous lawsuits with cryptocurrency companies and adopted a lax regulatory approach to cryptocurrency. In April 2026, during his conformation hearings, Atkins said he disapproved of a SEC rule that required all publicly traded companies disclose their contributions to climate change and the risk that the companies' operations face from climate change.

In September 2026, Atkins introduced a proposal to rescind "pay-to-play" regulation that prevents asset managers from managing money for government entities for two years after they donate to elected officials who oversee the entities. Atkins stated that the regulation suppressed political speech.

== Personal life ==
Atkins has three sons with his wife Sarah Humphreys Atkins, who is a major Republican donor. As of 2025, their combined net worth is estimated to be $327 million.

== See also ==
- 2008 financial crisis
- Appearances on C-SPAN
