= Troy A. Paredes =

American lawyer (born 1971)

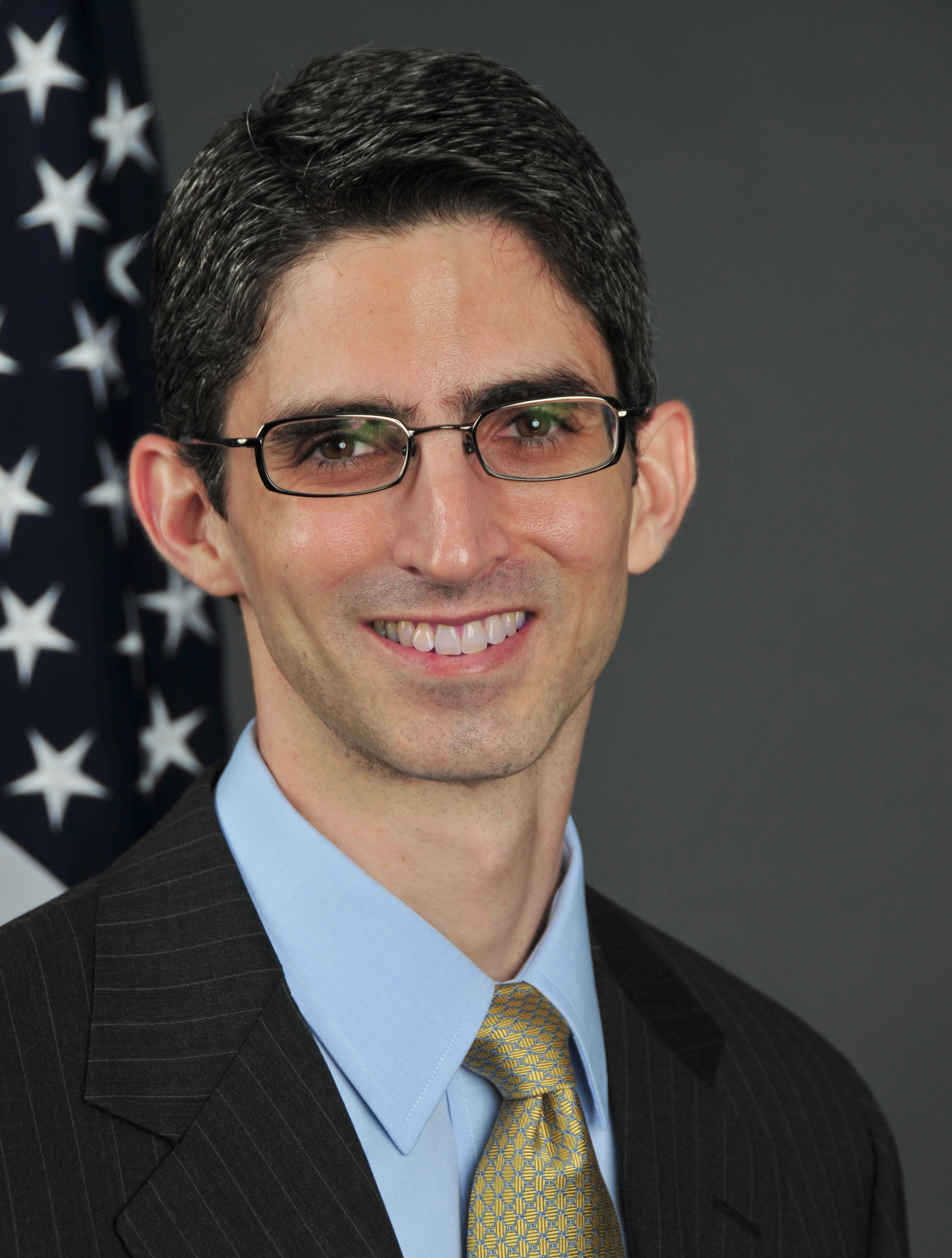

Commissioner of the U.S. Securities and Exchange Commission
- In office August 1, 2008 – August 3, 2013
- Preceded by: Paul S. Atkins
- Succeeded by: Michael Piwowar

Personal details
- Born: February 21, 1971 (age 55)
- Party: Republican
- Spouse: Laura
- Education: University of California at Berkeley, B.A. in economics, 1992 Yale Law School, J.D. 1996
- Profession: Lawyer

Troy A. Paredes served as a Commissioner of the U.S. Securities and Exchange Commission (SEC) from August 1, 2008, to August 3, 2013. Commissioner Paredes was appointed to the SEC by President George W. Bush on June 30, 2008 to replace Paul S. Atkins, a Republican commissioner, who was retiring at the end of his term. Paredes was replaced by Michael Piwowar who was sworn in on August 15, 2013.

== Legal career ==
After graduating from law school, Troy A. Paredes practiced law in California at prominent national law firms working on a variety of transactions and legal matters involving financings, mergers and acquisitions, and corporate governance.

According to a 2008 Directorship report, "Paredes was a member of the corporate securities group at Irell & Manella, an associate in the corporate and energy and natural resources departments at Steptoe & Johnson, and worked in the corporate department at O'Melveny & Myers." A slightly earlier Wall Street Journal Law Blog article reports most of this information, adding that Paredes "focus[ed] on leveraged buyouts, mergers and acquisitions and other financings."

In 2023, Paredes joined the Regulatory Advisory Board of Norm Ai.

== Academic life ==
Paredes began his academic career as a Professor of Law in 2001 and Business in 2007 (by courtesy) at Washington University in St. Louis. He has also visited at UCLA as well as Georgetown University and is currently a Distinguished Policy Fellow and Lecturer at the University of Pennsylvania Law School. He has authored numerous academic articles and is a co-author (beginning with the 4th edition) of a multi-volume securities regulation treatise with Louis Loss and Joel Seligman entitled Securities Regulation.

== Educational background ==
Paredes graduated from the University of California at Berkeley with a bachelor's degree in economics in 1992. He went on to receive his J.D. from Yale Law School in 1996.

== Actions on the Commission ==
According to the Wall Street Journal' (WSJ) and Directorship reports, "[i]n working papers in 2006 and 2007, Paredes took issue with a controversial SEC rule increasing oversight of hedge fund advisors. The 2004 rule, adopted despite opposition of Atkins and fellow Republican commissioner Cynthia Glassman, was overturned by a federal appeals court in 2006." The WSJ Law Blog went on to say that Paredes favored the SEC "recommend[ing] best practices and leav[ing] compliance up to the industry."
