= Francesca Danieli =

American collage artist, photographer and filmmaker

- Born: Francesca Costagliola; 1953; Bethesda, Maryland, U.S.
- Died: June 27, 2006 (aged 52–53); Baltimore, Maryland, U.S.
- Education: Virginia Commonwealth University (BFA); Columbia University (MBA)
- Spouse: Gary Gensler
- Children: 3

Francesca Danieli (1953 – June 27, 2006) was an American collage artist, photographer, and filmmaker.

== Early life and education ==
Born Francesca Costagliola in Bethesda, Maryland, Costagliola legally changed her name to Danieli at the age of 25. She earned a Bachelor of Fine Arts degree from Virginia Commonwealth University and a master's degree in business administration from Columbia University.

== Career ==
Danieli and Julia Kim Smith co-directed the film One Nice Thing, which asked participants at the 2004 Republican and Democratic national conventions to say one nice thing about the other party. Danieli's work is included in collections of the Museum of Fine Arts Houston and the Getty Museum.

== Personal life ==
Danieli's husband, Gary Gensler, became chair of the U.S. Securities and Exchange Commission. The couple has three children.

== Death ==
Danieli died on June 27, 2006, in Baltimore, Maryland from breast cancer.
