= Jaime Lizárraga =

American political advisor

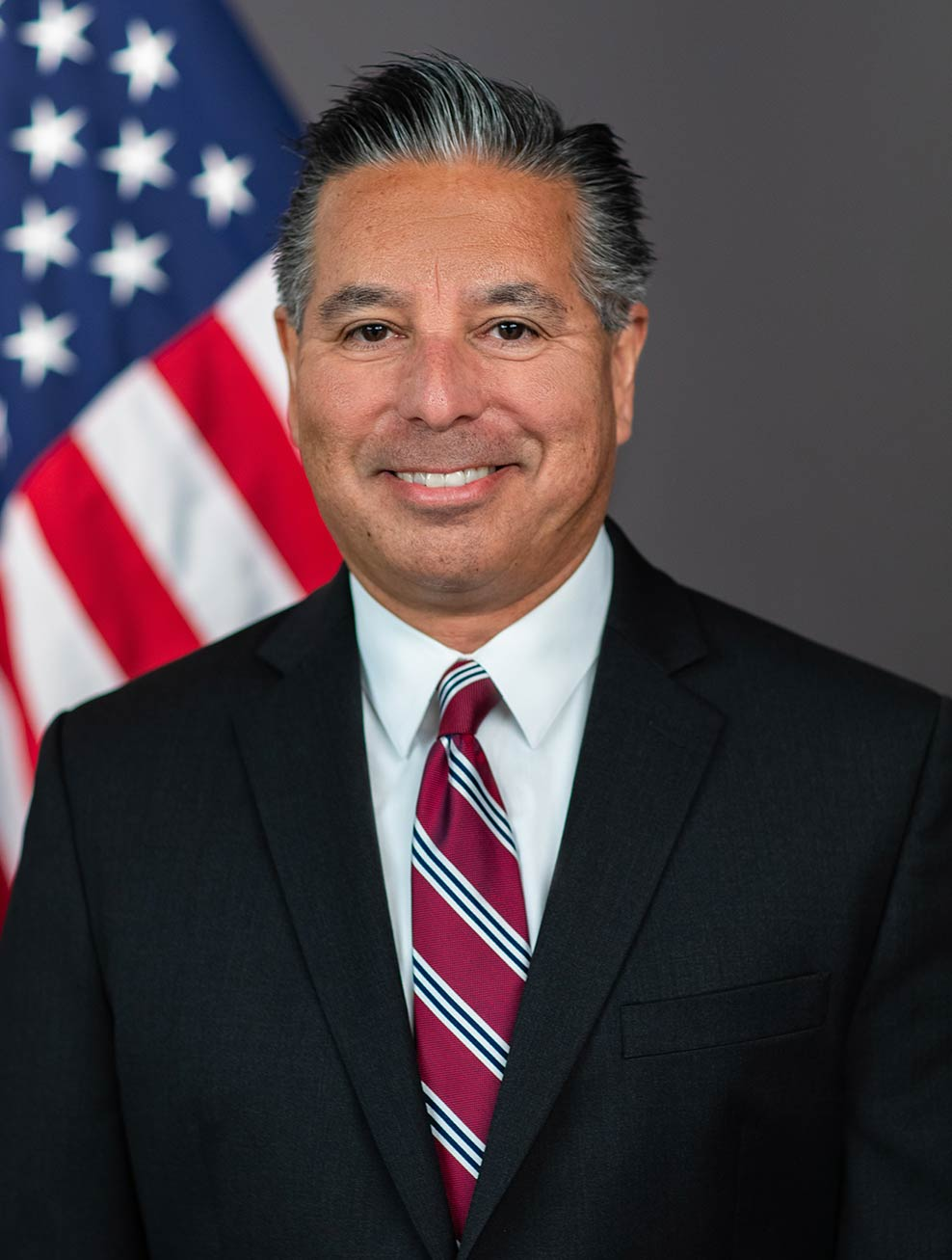

Commissioner of the U.S. Securities and Exchange Commission
- In office July 18, 2022 – January 17, 2025
- President: Joe Biden
- Preceded by: Allison Lee
- Succeeded by: Vacant

Personal details
- Born: California, U.S.
- Political party: Democratic
- Education: University of California, San Diego (BA); University of Texas at Austin (MPA)

Jaime E. Lizárraga is an American political advisor and government official who served as a commissioner of the U.S. Securities and Exchange Commission (SEC) from 2022 to 2025. A member of the Democratic Party, Lizárraga served as an aide to Nancy Pelosi from 2011 to 2022.

== Early life and education ==
The son of immigrant farm workers from Mexico, Lizárraga was born in the Central Valley and raised in the San Diego–Tijuana region. He earned a Bachelor of Arts degree in political science from the University of California, San Diego and a Master of Public Administration from the Lyndon B. Johnson School of Public Affairs at the University of Texas at Austin.

== Career ==
In the 1990s, Lizárraga briefly worked at the Securities and Exchange Commission as a deputy director of legislative affairs. From January 2011 to July 2022, Lizárraga worked in the office of Nancy Pelosi, serving as a senior advisor and member services coordinator.

During his tenure, Lizárraga worked on the Build Back Better Act, American Rescue Plan Act of 2021, PROMESA, the Dodd–Frank Wall Street Reform and Consumer Protection Act, and other pieces of legislation.

=== Securities and Exchange Commission (SEC) ===
President Joe Biden nominated Lizárraga to replace Democrat Allison Lee as a member of the Securities and Exchange Commission (SEC) in April 2022. He was confirmed by the United States Senate in June 2022. He was sworn into office on July 18, 2022.

Following the collapse of cryptocurrency exchange FTX, Lizárraga indicated in a speech that he agreed with SEC chair Gary Gensler's view that most crypto tokens should be regulated as securities. He argued that the "problems in the digital asset market are worse than those in the traditional finance system, because they occur in a largely unregulated space".

Lizárraga resigned from the SEC in January 2025.
