= Mark Wetjen =

American attorney

Mark P. Wetjen
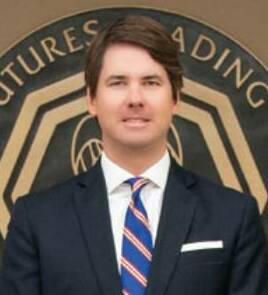
- Wetjen, c. 2014

Commissioner of the Commodity Futures Trading Commission
- In office October 25, 2011 – August 28, 2015
- President: Barack Obama

Personal details
- Born: 1973 or 1974 (age 52–53)
- Education: Creighton University; University of Iowa College of Law

Mark P. Wetjen is an American lawyer and the President of Backpack US, a digital-assets trading platform.. He was previously a partner at the law firm, Dentons. In 2011, he was nominated by Barack Obama to serve a five-year term as a Commissioner of the Commodity Futures Trading Commission (CFTC). He also served for five months as acting chairman of the CFTC upon the departure of his predecessor, Gary Gensler.

He was the head of global policy at DTCC and CEO of MIAX Futures. He also was the head of policy and regulatory strategy at FTX US and in that role was a Washington adviser to Sam Bankman-Fried, the CEO of FTX, until FTX filed for bankruptcy and entered receivership.

== Early life and education ==
Wetjen grew up in Dubuque, Iowa. He received a bachelor’s degree from Creighton University and then a Juris Doctor degree from the University of Iowa College of Law.

== Career ==
After law school, Wetjen worked as a lawyer in private practice. He then worked for seven years in the United States Senate as a senior leadership staffer where he advised on financial services issues including the Consumer Protection Act of 2010 and the Dodd-Frank Wall Street Reform. He worked for Harry Reid and other Democrats on “a number of banking, housing, communications, technology, and gaming policy issues and legislative initiatives.”

Wetjen joined the CFTC in 2011. In late 2013, he became the acting chairman of the CFTC after Gary Gensler left the position. Wetjen served in the position for about five months. During his tenure as acting chair, he was credited with easing tensions with other international regulators and striking a deal with European regulators regarding the treatment of trading platforms. Wetjen championed the prioritization of end investors when developing risk-management policy at the CFTC. As sponsor of the Global Markets Advisory Committee, Wetjen convened the first public meeting by the CFTC in October 2014 to discuss the regulatory treatment of digital assets.

On November 3, 2014, in an op-ed in The Wall Street Journal, Wetjen called for the establishment of a governmental regulatory structure for Bitcoin. Wetjen resigned from the CFTC on August 28, 2015.

Wetjen joined DTCC as the head of global public policy in the fall of 2015. He was later appointed chairman of DTCC DerivServ in 2019. While at DTCC Wetjen supported the adoption of enhanced risk-management standards for securities clearinghouses by the SEC and noted how they would promote international coordination.

Wetjen joined the startup exchange operator Miami International Holdings (MIAX Exchange Group) as the CEO of MIAX Futures in January 2020. Wetjen worked with MIAX to acquire the Minneapolis Grain Exchange.

In November 2021, Wetjen became the head of policy and regulatory strategy at FTX US, a company distinct from FTX.com. Wetjen was Sam Bankman-Fried’s top Washington advisor during his efforts to lobby the United States Congress to pass legislation on crypto currency. Wetjen's relationship with FTX ended when the company filed for Chapter 11 bankruptcy. His work with FTX has drawn scrutiny and criticism, given his prior government service. During his time in the industry in 2022, Wetjen called for comprehensive legislation to "plug oversight holes" and ensure consumer protections. He also has opined that federally supervised crypto markets would bring useful competition to U.S. capital markets.

Wetjen joined the law firm, Dentons, in 2024 and was appointed to the Law360 editorial advisory board for capital markets in 2025.

== Personal life ==
Wetjen lives in the Capitol Hill neighborhood of Washington, D.C., with his wife and two sons.
