= Allison Lee =

American lawyer

Allison Herren Lee
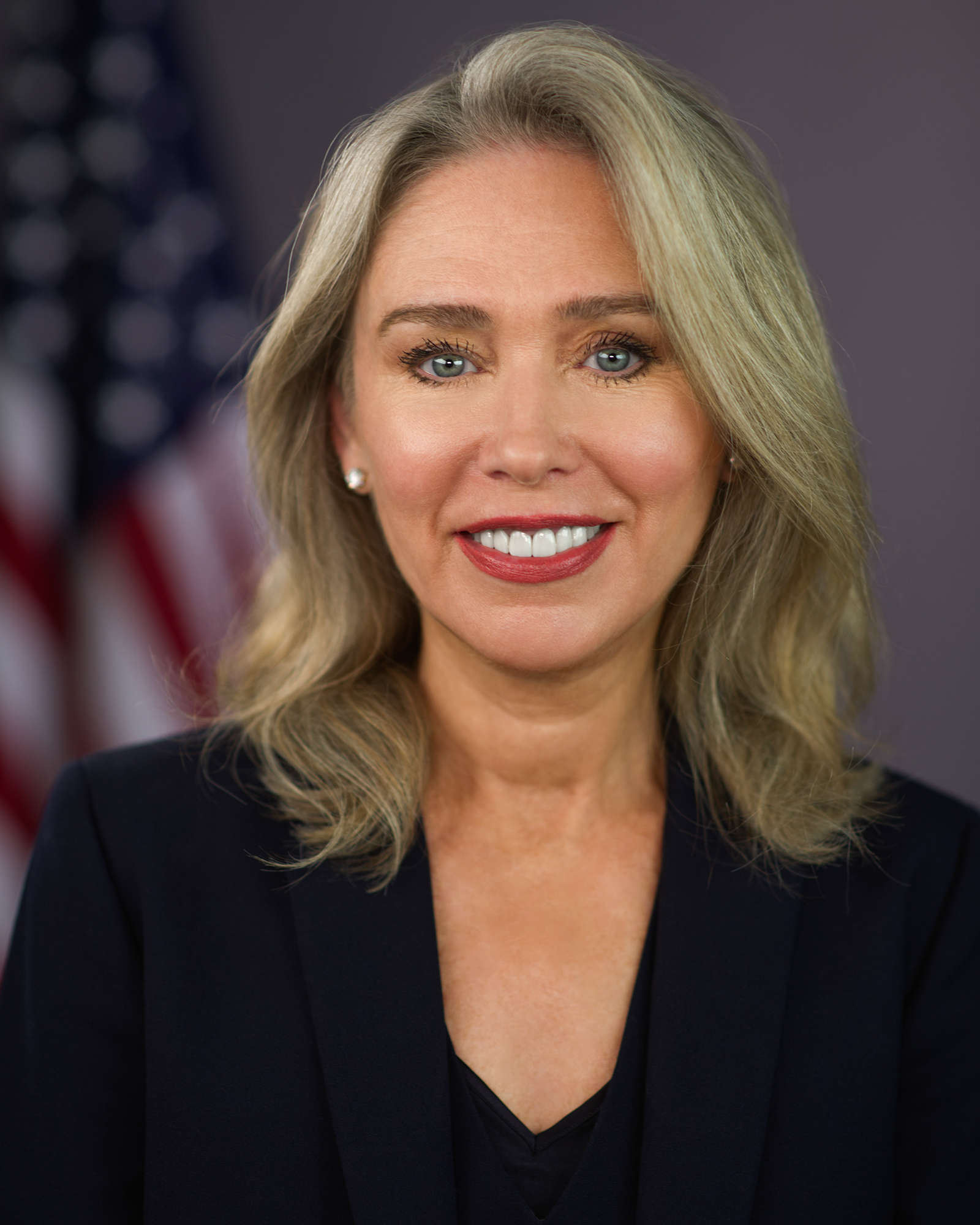

Commissioner of the Securities and Exchange Commission
- In office July 8, 2019 – July 15, 2022
- President: Donald Trump; Joe Biden
- Preceded by: Kara Stein
- Succeeded by: Jaime Lizárraga

Acting Chair of the Securities and Exchange Commission
- In office January 21, 2021 – April 17, 2021
- President: Joe Biden
- Preceded by: Elad L. Roisman (Acting)
- Succeeded by: Gary Gensler

Personal details
- Party: Democratic
- Education: University of Colorado, Boulder (BA); University of Denver (JD)

Allison Herren Lee is an American attorney and former government official who served as a member of the Securities and Exchange Commission (SEC) from 2019 to 2022.

A member of the Democratic Party, Lee briefly served as acting chair of the SEC from January to April 2021. After leaving the SEC, Lee became an adjunct professor at the New York University (NYU) School of Law In 2023, she joined the whistleblower law firm Kohn, Kohn & Colapinto.

== Education ==
Lee received a degree in business from the University of Colorado, Boulder and a Juris Doctor from the University of Denver College of Law. During her time at law school, Lee was salutatorian, a chancellor’s Scholar, and served on the school's Law Review.

== Career ==
Prior to joining the SEC, Lee worked in private practice as a partner at Sherman & Howard LLC. She also served as a Special Assistant U.S. Attorney and was a member of the American Bar Association’s former Committee on Public Company Disclosure.

== U.S. Securities and Exchange Commission ==
In 2005, Lee joined the agency as a staff attorney at the SEC's enforcement division at a regional office in Denver, Colorado. Before being appointed as a commissioner, Lee served in various roles at the SEC for over a decade, including as counsel to Commissioner Kara Stein, and as senior counsel in the Division of Enforcement’s Complex Financial Instruments Unit.

=== Tenure ===
Lee was confirmed by the United States Senate in June 2019 to fill a Democratic vacancy on the SEC. She announced her departure from the agency in 2022, and Democrat Jaime Lizárraga was confirmed as her successor of the SEC.

==== ESG issues ====
During her tenure, Lee was credited with bringing environmental, social, and corporate governance (ESG) issues to the forefront of the agency's agenda. As a commissioner, Lee hired a policy advisor focused on ESG issues and initiated a commission task force to clamp down on alleged "greenwashing". During her time as acting SEC chair, Lee helped craft rules that directed the SEC to gather public input on corporate climate change disclosures.

== Post-SEC career ==
In 2022, it was announced that Lee would join the New York University School of Law as an adjunct professor and senior fellow at the school's Institute for Corporate Governance and Finance.
