= Jay Clayton =

American attorney (born 1966)

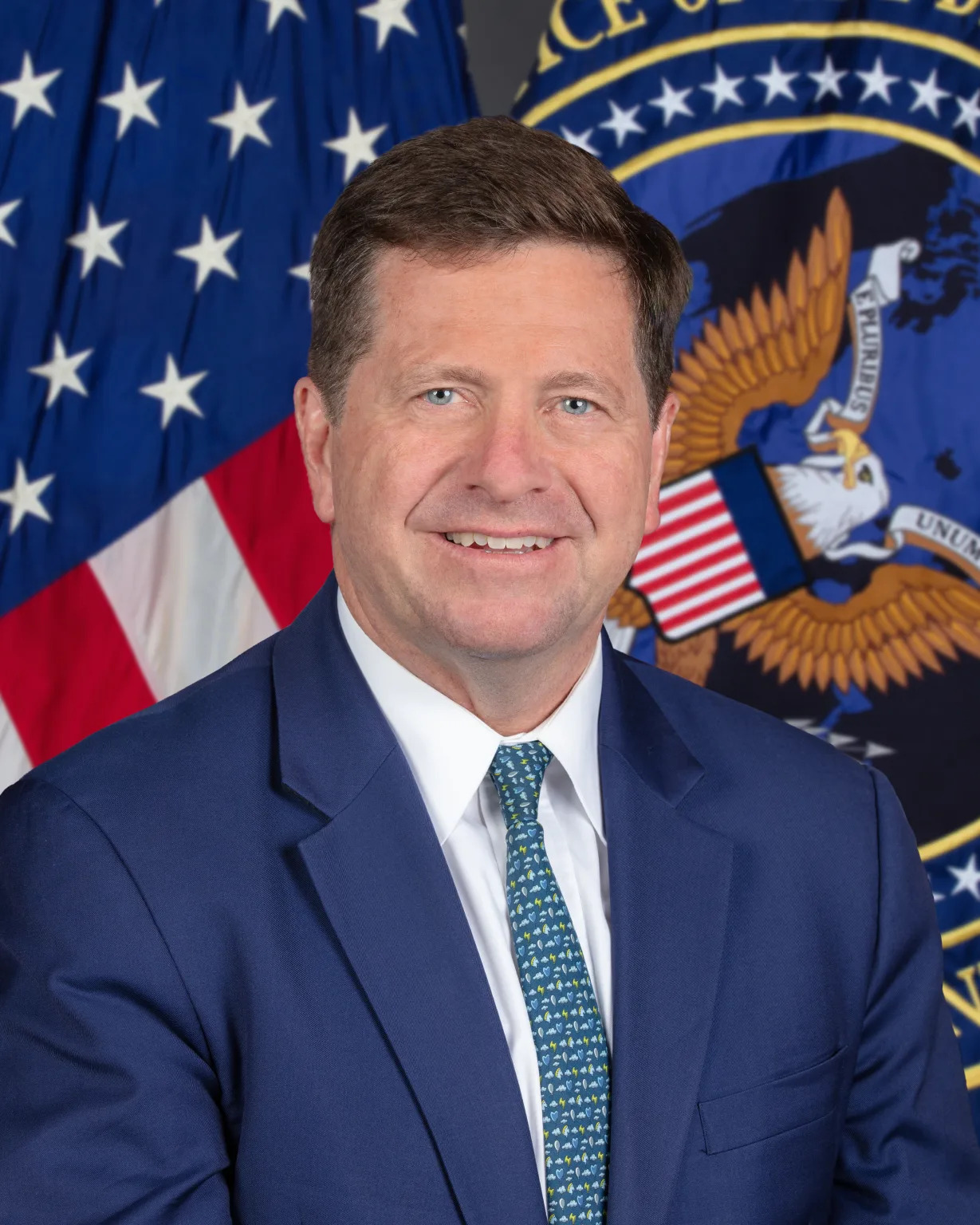
- Official portrait, 2026

9th Director of National Intelligence
- Incumbent
- Assumed office August 3, 2026
- President: Donald Trump
- Deputy: Aaron Lukas
- Preceded by: Tulsi Gabbard; Bill Pulte (acting)

White House AI Czar
- Incumbent
- Assumed office October 3, 2026
- President: Donald Trump
- Preceded by: David Sacks

United States Attorney for the Southern District of New York
- In office April 22, 2025 – July 29, 2026; Acting: April 22, 2025 – August 19, 2025
- President: Donald Trump
- Preceded by: Damian Williams
- Succeeded by: James McDonald

Chair of the Securities and Exchange Commission
- In office May 4, 2017 – December 23, 2020
- President: Donald Trump
- Preceded by: Michael Piwowar (acting)
- Succeeded by: Elad L. Roisman (acting)

Personal details
- Born: Walter Joseph Clayton III; July 11, 1966 (age 60) Newport News, Virginia, U.S.
- Party: Independent
- Spouse: Gretchen Butler
- Education: University of Pennsylvania (BS, JD); King's College, Cambridge (BA)

Walter Joseph "Jay" Clayton III (born July 11, 1966) is an American attorney who has served as the 9th director of national intelligence since August 2026. Clayton has additionally served as the White House AI czar since October 2026. He served as the United States attorney for the Southern District of New York from 2025 to 2026 and as the chairman of the Securities and Exchange Commission from 2017 to 2020.

After graduating from the University of Pennsylvania Law School in 1993, Clayton was a law clerk for Marvin Katz of the United States District Court for the Eastern District of Pennsylvania from 1993 to 1995. Clayton worked for Sullivan & Cromwell for over twenty years, where he was involved in business deals.

In January 2017, President-elect Donald Trump nominated Clayton to serve as the chair of the Securities and Exchange Commission. The Senate voted to confirm Clayton in May. Clayton resigned from the position in December 2020. After his resignation, Clayton worked for Apollo Global Management and rejoined Sullivan & Cromwell. In April 2025, Trump named Clayton as the acting U.S. attorney for the Southern District of New York. He was approved by the district's judges in August.

In June 2026, Trump named Clayton as his nominee to serve as the director of national intelligence. The Senate voted along party lines to confirm Clayton as the director of national intelligence the following month.

== Early life and education ==
Walter Joseph Clayton III was born on July 11, 1966, at the McDonald Army Health Center at Fort Eustis in Newport News, Virginia. Clayton's father, Walter Clayton Jr., was a lieutenant in the United States Army who began serving a years-long tour of duty in the Vietnam War months after Clayton was born. The elder Clayton later became an executive at the Hershey Company. The Claytons resided variously in Philadelphia; Camp Hill, Pennsylvania; and near Hershey, Pennsylvania.

Clayton attended Nether Providence High School in Wallingford, Pennsylvania, where he was a goalie on its soccer team. In 1983, Wallingford-Swarthmore School District officials closed Nether Providence and its other high school, Swarthmore, to establish Strath Haven High School. Clayton graduated from Strath Haven in 1984. Clayton met his future wife, Gretchen Butler, at Nether Providence.

Clayton briefly attended Lafayette College, where he played on its men's soccer team, before transferring to the University of Pennsylvania, where he graduated with a Bachelor of Science in engineering in 1988. He then received a Thouron Award to study in the United Kingdom. He graduated from the University of Cambridge in 1990 with a Bachelor of Arts in economics. Clayton was briefly the captain of Cambridge's basketball team. He graduated from the University of Pennsylvania Law School with a Juris Doctor in 1993.

== Career ==
=== Clerkship and private practice (1993–2017) ===
After graduating from the University of Pennsylvania Law School, Clayton clerked for Judge Marvin Katz of the United States District Court for the Eastern District of Pennsylvania from 1993 to 1995. Following his clerkship, Clayton worked for Sullivan & Cromwell, where he remained as late as 2017. Clayton served as a partner at Sullivan & Cromwell. At the firm, he was involved in mergers-and-acquisitions, market offerings, and regulatory proceedings. Amid the 2008 financial crisis, he handled Barclays's acquisition of Lehman Brothers and JPMorgan Chase's acquisition of Bear Stearns. Clayton represented Goldman Sachs after Berkshire Hathaway purchased preferred stock in the firm in 2008. He oversaw the New York State Bar Association's report criticizing the Department of Justice and the Securities and Exchange Commission for "zealous" law enforcement in 2011. Clayton was involved in Alibaba Group's initial public offering in 2014 and the sale of the Atlanta Hawks in 2015.

Clayton's clients included Castleton Commodities International, Ally Financial, British Airways, Oaktree Capital Management, Och-Ziff Capital Management Group, and Moelis & Company. In a filing to the Office of Government Ethics in March 2017, Clayton disclosed numerous firms that he had advised that had not been previously reported, including Deutsche Bank, UBS, and Volkswagen. He represented SoftBank; the Weinstein Company; Reid Hoffman, the co-founder of LinkedIn; and William Erbey, the founder of Ocwen Financial Corporation. Clayton additionally represented Pershing Square Capital Management, Paul Tudor Jones, and Valeant Pharmaceuticals International. He worked on several deals for TeliaSonera, a Swedish telecommunications company that dealt business with Russia and Iran. In March 2017, his biography was removed from Sullivan & Cromwell's website.

=== University of Pennsylvania (2009–2017) ===
In 2009, Clayton became an adjunct professor at the University of Pennsylvania Law School. He taught a class on mergers-and-acquisitions.

== Chair of the Securities and Exchange Commission (2017–2020) ==
=== Nomination and confirmation ===
According to Reuters, Joseph Shenker proposed that Clayton could serve as the chair of the Securities and Exchange Commission to Jared Kushner, President-elect Donald Trump's son-in-law. In December 2016, Trump met with Clayton to discuss regulatory policy in the United States. On January 4, 2017, Trump named Clayton as his nominee for chair of the Securities and Exchange Commission. His nomination was viewed as a departure from the commission's aggressive enforcement led by Chairwoman Mary Jo White. Clayton was criticized by some Democrats on the Senate Committee on Banking, Housing, and Urban Affairs, including its ranking member, Ohio senator Sherrod Brown, and Massachusetts senator Elizabeth Warren, for his associations to Wall Street firms. Clayton's nomination was submitted to the Senate hours after Trump's inauguration on January 20. His confirmation was delayed by an Office of Government Ethics filing that had not been submitted by March.

Prior to Clayton's confirmation hearing, Warren and Vermont senator Bernie Sanders questioned whether his close ties to Wall Street would favor the interests of large financial firms. Clayton appeared before the Senate Committee on Banking, Housing, and Urban Affairs on March 23. He sparred with Warren over how the Securities and Exchange Commission would conduct enforcement and did not offer specific answers on how he would handle certain issues, including the pay-ratio rule. The committee voted to advance Clayton's nomination on April 4. Democratic senators Jon Tester of Montana, Mark Warner of Virginia, and Heidi Heitkamp of North Dakota joined Republicans in supporting Clayton. The Senate voted to confirm Clayton in a 61–37 vote on May 2.

=== Initial tenure ===
On May 4, 2017, Clayton was sworn in as the chair of the Securities and Exchange Commission by Justice Anthony Kennedy. In an effort to ease regulations on capital markets, he appointed William Hinman, a former Simpson Thacher & Bartlett lawyer, to serve as the director of corporation finance. That month, Clayton named Steven Peikin, a former Sullivan & Cromwell partner, and Stephanie Avakian as the co-directors of enforcement. According to The New York Times, Clayton was friends with Peikin. In his first speech as the commission's chair in July, Clayton told the Economic Club of New York that cybersecurity presented a significant risk to companies. He disclosed that the Securities and Exchange Commission's Electronic Data Gathering, Analysis, and Retrieval database had been hacked in September. His testimony before the Senate Committee on Banking, Housing, and Urban Affairs that month was largely overshadowed by the breach and by a data breach that affected the credit agency Equifax that year.

As the chairman of the Securities and Exchange Commission, Clayton directed the commission to emphasize cases in which retail investors had clearly been harmed. He was skeptical of the commission's previous effort to penalize corporations broadly, including at the expense of investors. A review of the Securities and Exchange Commission's enforcement efforts conducted by Politico in October 2017 found that corporate penalties had largely fallen in number and scale at the commission. According to The Wall Street Journal, Clayton delayed the attempted sale of the Chicago Stock Exchange to a Chinese-led investment group at the behest of the Trump administration. In several speeches, he argued that cryptocurrencies were securities and should be regulated by the commission. In December, he warned that initial coin offerings would be detrimental to investors if they were unregulated securities.

Clayton had asserted that the Securities and Exchange Commission should prioritize protecting retail investors. He advocated for exposing retail investors to private companies, reserving that although the investments had the possibility of being "pretty risky", they were desired by some individuals. After the Securities and Exchange Commission settled its lawsuit with Elon Musk over his false claim that he had secured funding to take Tesla private, Clayton was supportive of a strategy in which enforcement penalties for specific individuals would be weighed against their "skills and support". Clayton resisted Trump's call for federal regulations requiring companies to report quarterly results to be revised towards a six-month schedule. After Don McGahn stated his intention to resign as the White House counsel in March 2018, Clayton was suggested as his possible successor, according to Politico.

=== Concluding moves and resignation ===
In December 2018, Reuters reported that Clayton had been criticized by some Republicans, including Michigan representative Bill Huizenga, the chair of the House Financial Services Subcommittee on Capital Markets, for not aggressively pursuing pro-business policies and for frequently deferring to Democrats on the Securities and Exchange Commission. An analysis by Reuters found that Clayton voted with Democrats in over a third of votes, exceeding his predecessor Mary Jo White, who had been nominated by a Democratic president. By 2019, the number of enforcement actions against insider trading had fallen to its lowest level since 1985. According to some experts and former Securities and Exchange Commission lawyers, the decrease was likely attributable to Clayton's tenure. Clayton sought to promote initial public offerings by allowing all companies to privately discuss an initial public offering with potential investors and to limit the authority of dissenting shareholders; according to Bloomberg News, Clayton cited letters that were ostensibly from retail investors, but had actually originated from a corporate public-relations campaign. In June 2019, Clayton pushed for a "best interest" rule, requiring brokers to act in the best interest of their clients, to replace President Barack Obama's "fiduciary rule". The measure was criticized by some Democrats in the House of Representatives, state regulators, and investor advocates. Amid the COVID-19 pandemic, he advocated for private equity-backed firms to have access to Paycheck Protection Program loans.

According to The New York Times, Clayton told Attorney General William Barr that he was interested in becoming the U.S. attorney for the Southern District of New York in June 2020. Barr later told NPR that the attorney in the position, Geoffrey Berman, was "living on borrowed time" because he had not been appointed by Trump and that Clayton's interest in the position presented "an opportunity to put in a very strong person as a presidential appointment". On June 19, Barr announced that Berman had resigned and that Trump would nominate Clayton as the U.S. attorney for the Southern District of New York. Berman denied that he had left his position. South Carolina senator Lindsey Graham, the chair of the Senate Committee on the Judiciary, indicated that he would allow New York's senators to block the nomination. Clayton told the House Financial Services Subcommittee on Capital Markets that he would not withdraw his nomination, but that he would remain as the chair of the Securities and Exchange Commission. The plan eventually failed. In November, Clayton announced that he would resign at the end of the year.

== Post-government work (2021–2024) ==
In February 2021, The Wall Street Journal reported that Apollo Global Management had appointed Clayton as its board's lead independent director, a newly-formed position. The decision occurred as the firm was implementing an overhaul of its governance following allegations that its chief executive, Leon Black, had an extensive relationship with the financier and child sex offender Jeffrey Epstein. The Journal reported that Clayton would return to Sullivan & Cromwell as its senior policy adviser and counsel and that he would return to the University of Pennsylvania Law School as an adjunct professor. In May 2021, Clayton was a paid advisor to the hedge fund One River Digital Asset Management, and was serving as an advisor to the cryptocurrency firm Fireblocks by August.

In 2022, Clayton joined the board of directors of American Express. By 2023, Clayton had become an adjunct professor at the University of Pennsylvania's Wharton School. In October 2023, Clayton told The New York Times that he was "evaluating his relationship" with the university after it was hesitant to refer to the October 7 attacks as terrorism. Clayton resigned from Apollo Global Management after being confirmed as the U.S. attorney for the Southern District of New York in April 2025.

== U.S. Attorney for the Southern District of New York (2025–2026) ==
=== Nomination and appointment ===
In April 2024, The Wall Street Journal reported that Trump's economic advisors had discussed Clayton as a possible candidate for secretary of the treasury. After Donald Trump's victory in the 2024 presidential election, The New York Times reported that Clayton had expressed interest in a cabinet-level position in Donald Trump's possible second term. According to Reuters, Clayton was a potential candidate to serve as Trump's nominee for secretary of the treasury, attorney general, or director of the Central Intelligence Agency, of which he was most likely to serve as the attorney general before Trump announced that he would nominate Florida representative Matt Gaetz to the position. On November 14, Trump announced that he would nominate Clayton to serve as the U.S. attorney for the Southern District of New York.

After the Department of Justice directed the U.S. Attorney's Office for the Southern District of New York to end its prosecution of New York City mayor Eric Adams, concerns emerged from within the office that Clayton would not act independently from Trump. According to Politico, Clayton was alleged to have told the acting U.S. attorney for the district, Danielle Sassoon, to follow Principal Associate Deputy Attorney General Emil Bove's order to end the prosecution. In March 2025, Politico reported that Clayton had already begun recruiting possible deputies, including a former public corruption prosecutor for the Southern District of New York. According to Bloomberg News, Clayton privately signaled that he intended to keep the office together by targeting Trump's policies, particularly on human trafficking, antisemitic hate crimes, and college protests over the Gaza war.

=== Tenure and judicial appointment ===
On April 16, 2025, New York senator Chuck Schumer moved to block Clayton's nomination by refusing to return his blue slip. Hours later, Trump appointed Clayton to serve as the acting U.S. attorney for the Southern District of New York, bypassing Schumer. Clayton was sworn in on April 22. That day, three prosecutors in the Eric Adams case resigned, resisting pressure to admit wrongdoing. In April, Clayton and Yaakov M. Roth, the assistant attorney general for the civil division, signed a letter stating that the United States could sue UNRWA. In July, officials at the Department of Justice moved to fire Maurene Comey, a prosecutor in Clayton's office. According to The New York Times, Clayton was not aware of the department's intention to fire Comey until it had occurred.

On August 18, 2025, the deadline of Clayton's 120-day appointment as the acting U.S. attorney for the Southern District of New York, judges in the District Court for the Southern District of New York voted to retain Clayton. In November, Trump ordered the Department of Justice to investigate Democrats who were associates of Jeffrey Epstein. Attorney General Pam Bondi assigned Clayton to lead the investigation. The decision strained Clayton's independence from Trump, which had gone unresolved after a tenure that largely avoided Trump's intervention. The Epstein Files Transparency Act forced over two-thirds of the lawyers in Clayton's office to review millions of documents in the Epstein case. In February 2026, Clayton established a program to allow companies to avoid criminal charges for financial misconduct, including fraud, by self-reporting to his office. In July, Clayton issued subpoenas to several journalists at The New York Times who reported on security concerns involving the Boeing VC-25B Bridge. Clayton resigned as the U.S. attorney for the Southern District of New York on July 29, after he was confirmed to serve as the director of national intelligence.

== Director of National Intelligence (2026–present) ==
=== Nomination and confirmation ===
On June 11, 2026, President Donald Trump named Clayton as his nominee to succeed Tulsi Gabbard as the director of national intelligence. According to The New York Times, John Ratcliffe, the director of the Central Intelligence Agency, recommended Clayton to Trump. The decision occurred as some Democrats and Republicans in the Senate publicly balked at Bill Pulte, whom Trump had named as the acting director of national intelligence to temporarily serve in Gabbard's position; according to the Times, the threat of Pulte's appointment added urgency to confirming Clayton quickly. Clayton was set to appear before the Senate Select Committee on Intelligence on June 17. Prior to Clayton's confirmation hearing, Senate Majority Leader John Thune indicated that the Senate could move to confirm Clayton to prevent Pulte from becoming the acting director of national intelligence. Hours before the hearing, Trump announced that it would be delayed indefinitely until James M. McDonald was confirmed to succeed Clayton.

Clayton appeared before the Senate Select Committee on Intelligence on July 15. Several Democrats repeatedly asked Clayton who won the 2020 presidential election, gauging his ability to provide Trump with unbiased information; Clayton, initially evasive, conceded to Mark Warner that Joe Biden was "fairly and duly elected under our process" during the 2020 United States presidential election. The Senate Select Committee on Intelligence voted to advance Clayton's nomination in a vote along party lines on July 21. Clayton had been set to receive greater Democratic support, particularly to force the removal of Pulte, but his answers on the 2020 election dismayed some Democrats. The Senate voted to confirm Clayton in a 51–47 vote along party lines on July 28.

=== Tenure ===
Following Clayton's confirmation, Pulte urged Trump to delay the swearing in. Clayton was sworn in August 3, 2026, and appointed the White House AI czar in October.

== Political positions ==
Clayton is a registered independent. He donated to Barack Obama's and Mitt Romney's presidential campaigns. In 2015, Clayton donated to Jeb Bush's 2016 presidential campaign.

Political offices
Preceded by Michael Piwowar; Acting	Chair of the Securities and Exchange Commission; 2017–2020	Succeeded by Elad L. Roisman; Acting
Preceded by Bill Pulte; Acting	Director of National Intelligence; 2026–present	Incumbent
