= Stephanie Avakian =

American lawyer and government official

Stephanie Avakian is an American lawyer, regulator and white collar criminal defense specialist appointed on June 8, 2017 to co-head the U.S. Securities and Exchange Commission (SEC) Division of Enforcement, a title she shared with Steven Peikin. As of 2023 she had moved into private practice, working for WilmerHale.

== Pre-SEC ==
Stephanie Avakian was born in Vineland, New Jersey. She studied law in The College of New Jersey for her bachelor's degree and at Temple University for her master's degree in 1995. She started her career in law in SEC as a Chief of Enforcement in New York. She decided to leave the SEC and moved to partner at Wilmer Cutler Pickering Hale and Dorr LLP but then moved back to SEC when she was offered to be the Deputy Director of the SEC's Division of Enforcement. At her private practice, she worked on the 2008 financial crisis, helping financial institutions and private clients that helped her bring back skills to lead in the SEC.

== Career ==
Avakian worked at the SEC from 1995 to 1999 as an investigator and counsel to former commissioner Paul Carey.

She later moved to private practice, joining Wilmer Cutler Pickering Hale and Dorr LLP, where she became vice chair of the firm’s securities practice. There, she represented financial institutions, public companies, boards, and individuals in matters before the SEC and other agencies.

In June 2014, Avakian returned to the SEC as Deputy Director of the Division of Enforcement. In that role, she was tasked with enforcing many of 2010 Dodd-Frank provisions put in place to police markets after the 2008 financial crisis.

She was named Acting Director of the division in December, 2016 after Director Andrew Ceresney stepped down.

As co-chair of the division, she has cited cybercrime as one of the biggest threats to the financial markets and will have some latitude in setting enforcement and prosecution priorities for the agency. During her career at the Securities and Exchange Commission, Stephanie Avakian kept her focus on investors and threats to the market where she legislated 3000 enforcement actions and over $17 billion financial remedies. Her success in leading thousands of cases alongside Steven Peikin enables thousands of investors to their markets secure amidst the Covid-19 pandemic.

== 2020 ==
Under Avakian, trading was suspended when questions arose about integrity and adequacy of information in the marketplace by which there were six COVID-related actions were a fraud. Avakian continued to emphasize safeguarding information, privacy of information, and abuse of the markets being volatile. Moreover, she was in charge of the Coronavirus Steering Committee where she took care of COVID-19 misconducts in the market. Avakian, under pressure of the pandemic, continued her leadership role virtually, working on keeping American Investors safe throughout the pandemic. By the end of 2020, Stephanie Avakian ended her tenure.

== 2022 ==
In early December 2022 she took on Caroline Ellison, former CEO of Alameda Research as her client at law firm WilmerHale.

== Personal life ==
=== Relationships and family ===
Stephanie Avakian married Howard Heiss on October 26, 2002, in Manhattan, having met at a business meeting in Manhattan in August 2001.
