= Andrew Ceresney =

American lawyer

- Education: Columbia University (BA); Yale University (JD)
- Occupation: Attorney
- Employer: Debevoise & Plimpton
- Known for: Director of the U.S. Securities and Exchange Commission's Division of Enforcement (2013–2017)

Andrew J. Ceresney is an American lawyer at Debevoise & Plimpton and a former government official who served as director of the U.S. Securities and Exchange Commission's Division of Enforcement.

== Biography ==
Ceresney graduated from Columbia College, summa cum laude Phi Beta Kappa, in 1993 and received his J.D. from Yale Law School in 1996.

From 1996 to 1997, he served as a law clerk to Michael Mukasey, former Chief Judge of the United States District Court for the Southern District of New York. He then served as a law clerk to Dennis Jacobs, Chief Judge of the U.S. Court of Appeals for the Second Circuit between 1997 and 1998.

He served as Deputy Chief Appellate Attorney in the U.S. Attorney’s Office for the Southern District of New York, where he was a member of the Securities and Commodities Fraud Task Force and the Major Crimes Unit, overseeing investigations, trials, and appeals of white-collar crimes including securities fraud, mail fraud, money laundering, and corruption.

He joined Debevoise & Plimpton in 2003, becoming the co-chair of the firm's white collar and regulatory defense group. At Debevoise, Ceresney represented a number of the nation’s largest banks, including JPMorgan Chase during an inquiry involving its foreclosure practices. He also helped depose Donald Trump in a lawsuit against Timothy L. O'Brien for underestimating his net worth in a book.

In 2013, he was hired by Mary Jo White to join the U.S. Securities and Exchange Commission as Co-Director of its Division of Enforcement. Ceresney previously served as White's lieutenant as a defense lawyer at Debevoise and a federal prosecutor in the U.S. Attorney's Office for the Southern District of New York for more than a decade. He took sole leadership in 2014.

As head of SEC's division of enforcement, he took on a "broken windows" approach, enforcing the smallest of violations in hopes of keeping Wall Street from breaking major ones. Under his tenure, the division brought about 2,850 enforcement actions and obtained judgments and orders totaling more than $13.8 billion in monetary sanctions. The SEC also charged over 3,300 companies and over 2,700 individuals, including many senior corporate executives. Over 80 were tried in federal court, including insider trading cases against Leon Cooperman and sports better Billy Walters.

In 2017, Ceresney left the U.S. Securities and Exchange Commission and re-joined Debevoise & Plimpton as co-chair of the firm's litigation practice, a post once held by his mentor, Mary Jo White. He was succeeded by Stephanie Avakian.
