= Kara Stein =

American lawyer

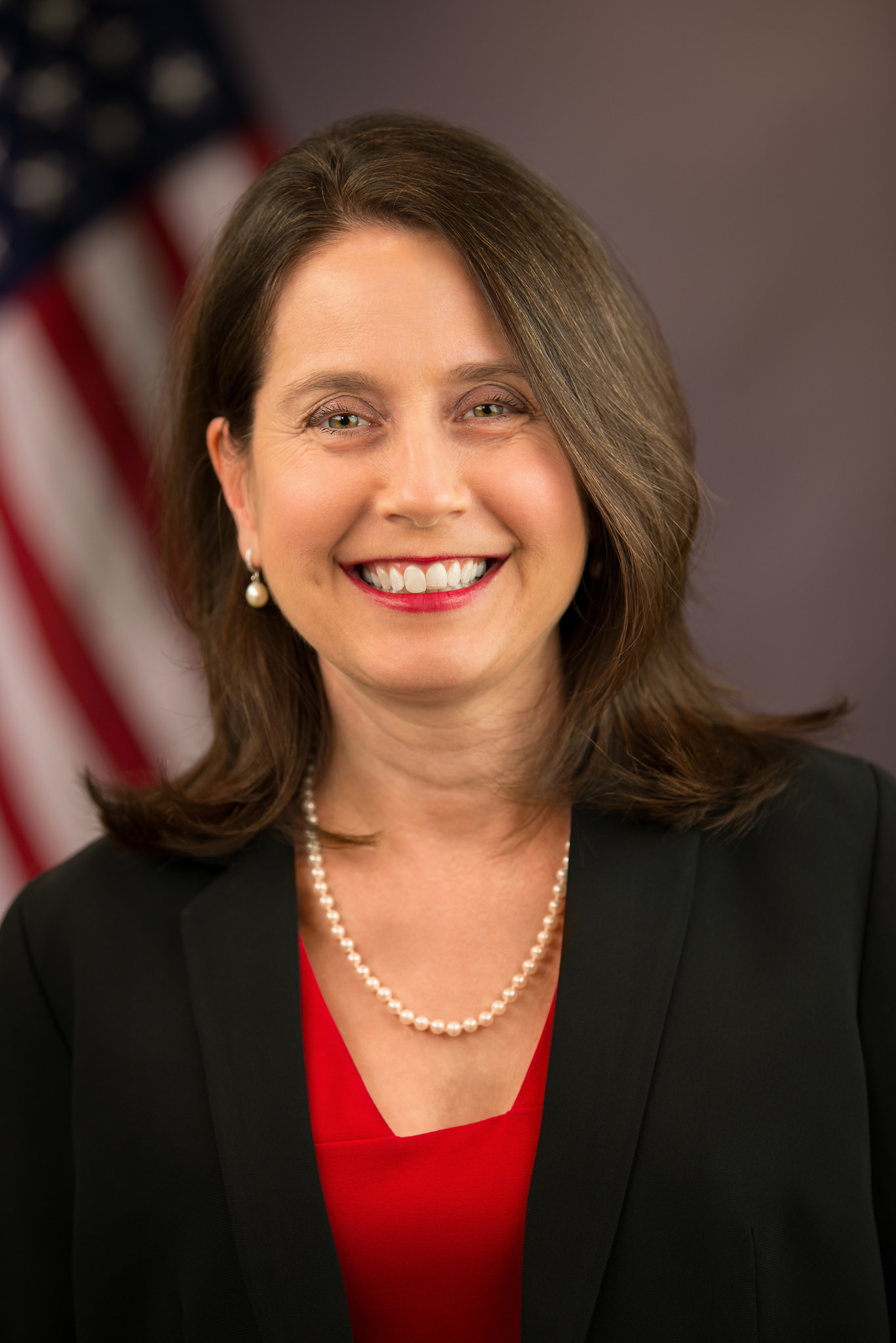

Member of the Securities and Exchange Commission
- In office August 9, 2013 – January 2, 2019
- President: Barack Obama; Donald Trump
- Preceded by: Elisse B. Walter
- Succeeded by: Allison Lee

Personal details
- Party: Democratic
- Education: Yale University (BA, JD)

Kara Marlene Stein is an American attorney who currently serves as a board member of the Public Company Accounting Oversight Board, known as PCAOB. Stein was sworn in on November 18, 2021, with a term through October 24, 2026.

Stein joined the U.S. Securities and Exchange Commission (SEC) in August 2013 and served until 2019. President Barack Obama nominated Stein in May 2013 to serve as a Democratic member of the Commission to succeed Elisse Walter. Stein was confirmed by the Senate and started tenure at the SEC in August 2013. During her tenure on the SEC (which was still evaluating its role in the 2008 financial crisis), Stein took strong positions to protect investors, from her early support of the Volcker Rule - which prevents banks with deposits insured by American taxpayers from making speculative trades on their own accounts - to her dissents to legal waivers granted to banks and other already-found-guilty corporate players.

Stein's written dissents won support afterwards from Senators Elizabeth Warren and Sherrod Brown, both of whom spoke and wrote at length about the potential damage to the US investor and the US economy from the waivers.

In early 2021, Stein was mentioned as a potential candidate to lead the Office of the Comptroller of the Currency (OCC).

== Education and career ==
Stein graduated from Yale University in 1986 and Yale Law School in 1991. Following her education, Stein was an associate at the law firm Wilmer, Cutler & Pickering (WilmerHale).

Before being appointed to the SEC, Stein was an aide to Democratic Senator Jack Reed of Rhode Island and helped write the Dodd–Frank Wall Street Reform and Consumer Protection Act.

== Securities and Exchange Commission (SEC) ==
During her tenure, Stein took strong stances to protect investors at SEC. Stein furthered the long-running to-and-fro debate at the SEC and in Congress over the questionable issuance of waivers to banks and other corporate entities that had been sanctioned by law for financial misconduct, due to their role in the 2008 financial crisis. The SEC was founded in 1934 as a response to the Wall Street Crash of 1929.

In April 2014, Stein published a dissent to an SEC judicial waiver granted to The Royal Bank of Scotland Group (RBS), which had been charged by the Justice Department with criminal violations. Stein argued that the SEC waiver risked establishing a policy "that some firms are just too big to bar."

The dissent won applause in June 2014 from Democratic Senator Sherrod Brown (who criticized the Republican SEC head directly about the decision) and from Democratic Senator Elizabeth Warren. In an April 2015 speech, Warren criticized the SEC's policy of granting the WKSI "Well-Known Seasoned Issuer" waivers, saying the SEC misses an opportunity to deter bad behavior when it rubber-stamps the waivers of prior court-ordered legal penalties. Republican members of the SEC argued for the judicial waivers designated for banks and other corporate players.

Stein also wrote dissents to SEC penalty-waivers (a form of selective pardon) granted to BNP Paribas, Citigroup, Barclays, USB and Oppenheimer & Co.

== Post-SEC career ==
After departing the SEC and prior to her appointment to PCAOB, Stein served on the faculty of several law schools, including serving as a Lecturer on Law at Harvard Law School, Lecturer-in-Law at University of Pennsylvania Law School, and Director of the AI & Capital Markets Initiative for the Center for Innovation at UC Hastings College of Law. Stein served on the ten-member Financial Stability Task Force coordinated by the Brookings Institution and University of Chicago Booth School of Business. She was also a member of the Board of Directors of the Investors Exchange but resigned when she joined PCAOB.
