= Elad L. Roisman =

American lawyer

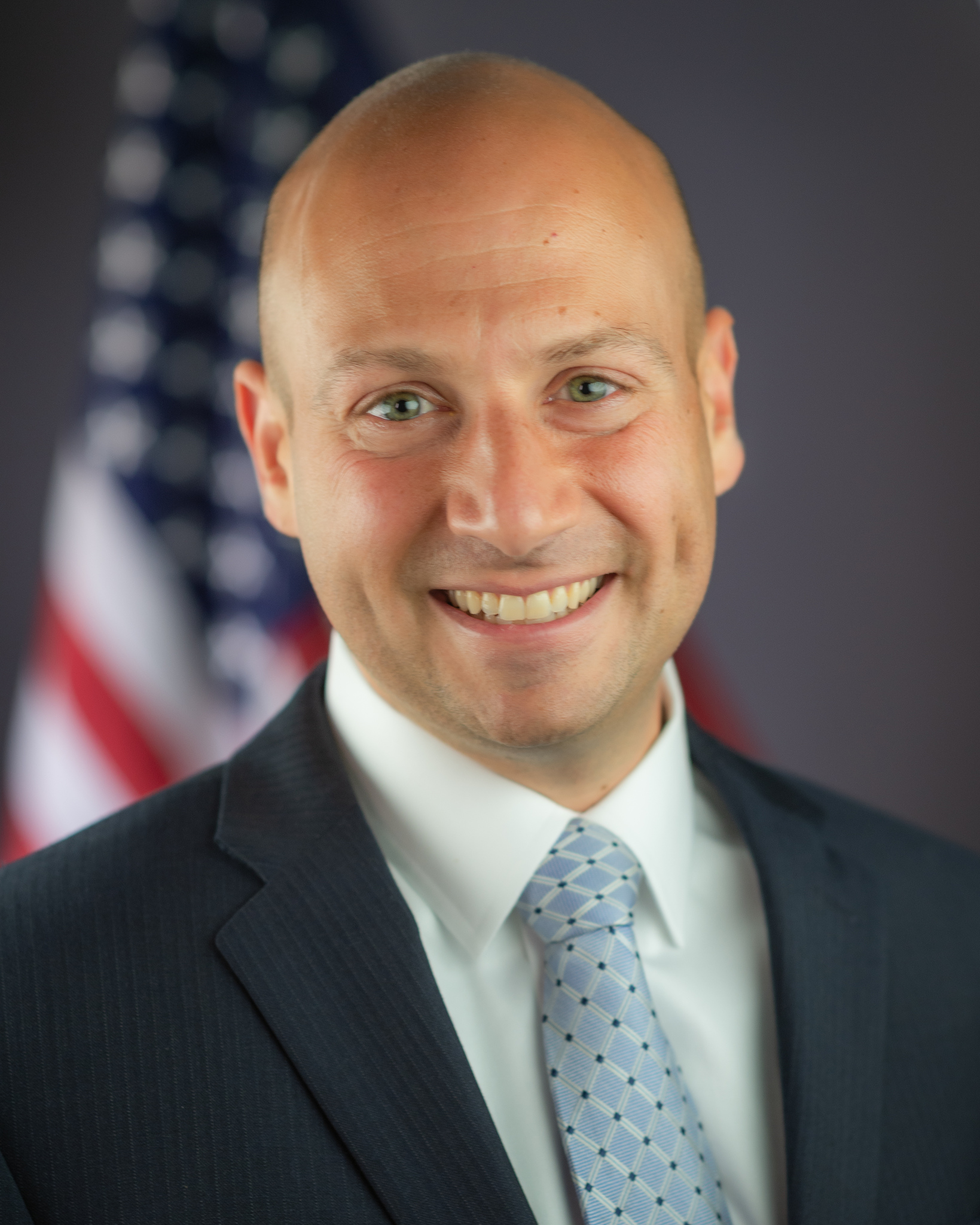

Acting Chairman of the United States Securities and Exchange Commission
- In office December 24, 2020 – January 20, 2021
- President: Donald Trump
- Preceded by: Jay Clayton
- Succeeded by: Allison Lee

Commissioner of the United States Securities and Exchange Commission
- In office September 11, 2018 – January 21, 2022
- President: Donald Trump; Joe Biden
- Chairman: Jay Clayton; Himself (acting); Allison Lee (acting)
- Preceded by: Michael Piwowar
- Succeeded by: Mark Uyeda

Personal details
- Born: Elad Leon Roisman
- Party: Republican
- Education: Cornell University (BA); Boston University (JD)

Elad Leon Roisman is an American lawyer from Maine who is a former commissioner of the U.S. Securities and Exchange Commission.

== Education ==
Roisman received his Bachelor of Arts from Cornell University and his Juris Doctor from the Boston University School of Law.

== Career ==
Early in his career, Roisman served as chief counsel at NYSE Euronext and as an associate at the law firm of Milbank in New York. Roisman went on to serve as counsel to SEC Commissioner Daniel M. Gallagher. He then served as chief counsel of the Senate Committee on Banking, Housing, and Urban Affairs. While serving the committee he drafted several pieces of legislation including the Economic Growth, Regulatory Relief and Consumer Protection Act.

=== U.S. Securities and Exchange Commission ===
In 2018, President Donald Trump nominated Roisman to be a commissioner of the U.S. Securities and Exchange Commission to the seat vacated by Michael Piwowar, whose term expired. On August 23, 2018, his nomination was reported out of the Senate Committee on Banking, Housing and Urban Affairs. On September 5, 2018, his nomination was confirmed by a 85–14 vote. On September 11, 2018, he was sworn into office by Chairman Jay Clayton. On December 23, 2020, President Trump designated Roisman as Acting Chairman, effective December 24, and he served until January 20, 2021.

== Personal life ==
Roisman is a registered Republican.
