= Paul Capital =

- Type: Private
- Industry: Private Equity
- Founded: 1991
- Founder: Philip Paul
- Headquarters: San Francisco, California
- Key people: David de Weese, Bryon Sheets, David York, Guy Rico, Lionel Leventhal, Phil Jensen
- Total assets: $7.3 billion
- Number of employees: 100 (2009)
- Website: www.paulcap.com

Paul Capital is a private equity investment firm made up of a fund of funds, secondary investments and a healthcare direct investment (royalty and revenue interest financing) business. The firm has more than 100 employees and manages more than $7 billion across its three distinct investment platforms.

Paul Capital has offices in Hong Kong, London, New York City, Paris, São Paulo and San Francisco, as well as a network of regional representatives with local expertise in North America, Latin America, the United Kingdom, Western Europe, Central Europe, Eastern Europe, the Middle East, South Africa, Asia and Australia.

== History ==
Philip Paul founded the firm when he had the opportunity to acquire 42 venture capital and leveraged buyout fund positions from the Hillman Company in 1991. This was one of the earliest transactions in the private equity secondary market and was completed before there was a name for this market or dedicated pools of capital available to acquire such illiquid assets.

Paul Capital expanded its investment platforms to include a fund of funds business and a healthcare team to purchase royalty and revenue interests in drug and device products.

== Secondary investments ==
Paul Capital has been an investor in the private equity secondary market (also known as secondaries) since 1991. The firm's secondaries team is the oldest and largest of Paul Capital’s three investment platforms with more than $4.4 billion in assets under management. Paul Capital has opened dedicated secondary private equity offices in emerging markets, including Asia and Latin America.

Paul Capital’s latest secondary fund, Paul Capital Partners IX, L.P., closed in May 2008 with $1.65 billion in capital commitments.

Paul provides liquidity solutions to institutional investors through the acquisition of interests in private equity funds as well as interests in private companies. Paul Capital works with a broad range of sellers, including pension funds, financial institutions, endowments, family offices, corporations and general partners. In addition to “traditional” secondary private equity transactions, Paul employs transaction structures for investors with complex needs, including but not limited to: the inability to bear a significant discount to their carrying value, the need to preserve relationships with general partners in the portfolio while still achieving early liquidity and concerns about forgoing the future upside portfolios.
