= Securitize, Inc. =

Financial technology company

Securitize, Inc is a financial technology company that provides businesses a platform to raise capital from institutional, accredited or retail investors (crowdfunding) with shares issued in the form of digital tokens recorded on the blockchain, including for Oddity (the parent of online beauty brand Il Makiage) and digital custodian Exodus, which used the Securitize platform to raise $75 million in 2021. Securitize also operates a broker-dealer marketplace on which tokenized shares in private companies are traded. Securitize has approximately 3,000 clients with a combined 1.2 million investors and is regulated by both the U.S. Securities and Exchange Commission and FINRA. In June 2022, Securitize became authorized by the Spanish government to enter its securities test environment.

== Funding ==
Securitize has raised approximately $100 million in funding. Its most recent funding round was a $48 million Series B in June 2021, led by Morgan Stanley and Blockchain Capital, in what Forbes described as "Morgan Stanley’s first dedicated investment in the crypto space."

== History ==
- November 2017: Securitize founded by Carlos Domingo, Tim Reynders, Shay Finkelstein and Jamie Finn
- November 2020: Securitize acquires a broker-dealer license and automated trading system registration through the acquisition of Distributed Technology Markets
- March 2021: Securitize facilitates Sumitomo Mitsui Trust Bank's issuance of the first credit-rated, asset-backed security token fund in Japan
- May 2021: Securitize platform used to facilitate $75 million crowdfunded capital raise for Exodus Movement, the first company to reach the $75 million limit under updated Reg A+ rules
- June 2021: Securitize completes $48 million Series B investment round
- August 2021: Securitize facilitates the first television show to tokenize its net profits, "Hold On for Dear Life," produced and directed by Entourage's Rob Weiss
- September 2021: Securitize launches marketplace for trading digital asset securities
- October 2021: Securitize hires former SEC Division of Trading & Markets Director Brett Redfearn and announces advisory board including former Twitter CEO Dick Costolo
- December 2021: Securitize launches first tokenized funds tracking Standard & Poors indices
- February 2022: Securitize acquires Pacific Stock Transfer
- May 2022: Securitize confirms it will only offer stablecoins backed by U.S. dollars such as USDC

== See also ==
- Tokenized real-world asset
