= Michael Piwowar =

American securities executive

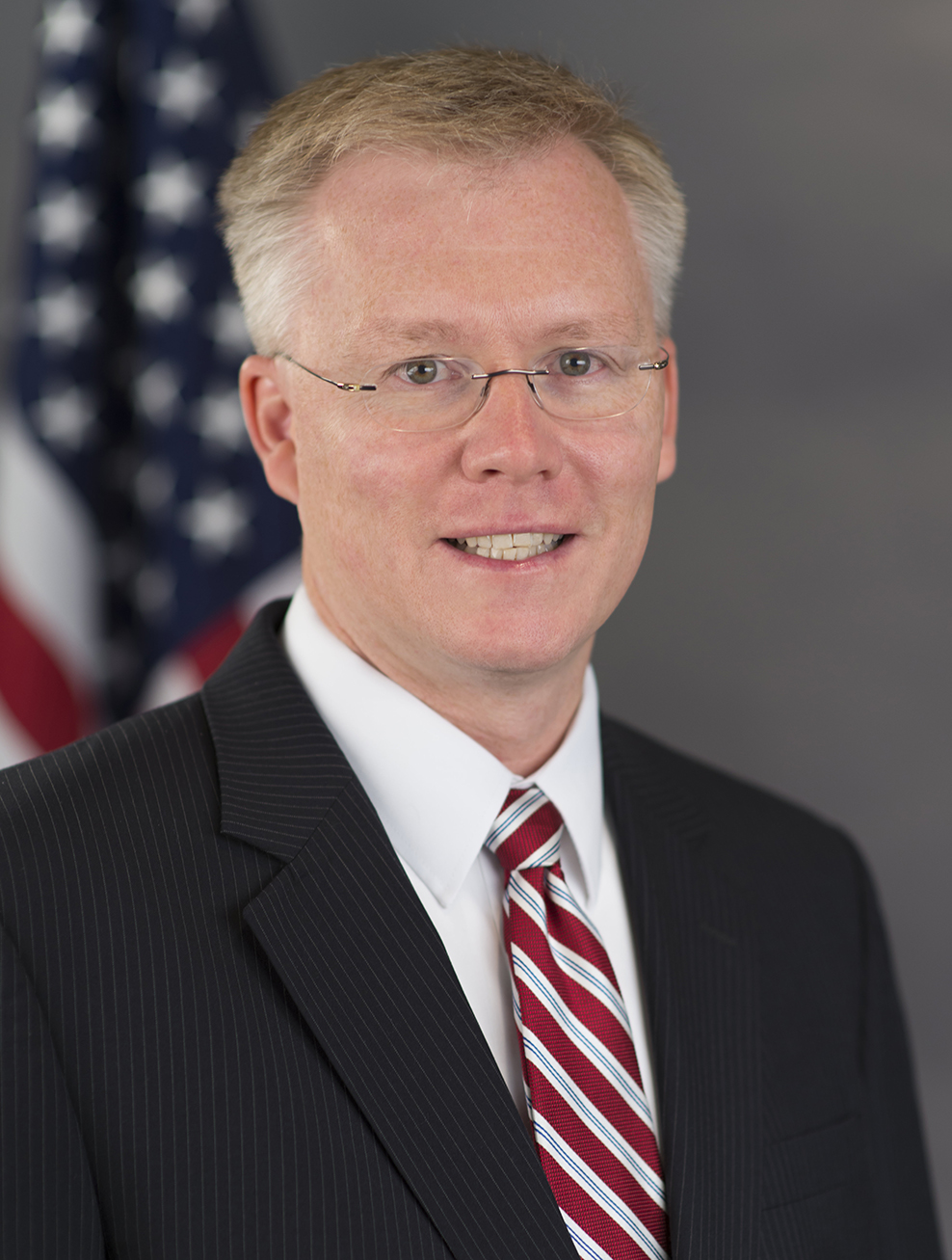

Acting Chair of the Securities and Exchange Commission
- In office January 20, 2017 – May 4, 2017
- President: Donald Trump
- Preceded by: Mary Jo White
- Succeeded by: Jay Clayton

Commissioner of the Securities and Exchange Commission
- In office August 15, 2013 – July 7, 2018
- President: Barack Obama; Donald Trump
- Preceded by: Mary Jo White
- Succeeded by: Elad L. Roisman

Personal details
- Party: Republican
- Education: Pennsylvania State University, University Park (BA, PhD); Georgetown University (MBA)

Michael Piwowar is the executive vice president of Milken Institute Finance and a former American federal government official who served as a Commissioner on the Securities and Exchange Commission from 2013 until 2018.

== Education ==
Piwowar earned a Bachelor of Arts in foreign service and international politics from Pennsylvania State University, Master of Business Administration from Georgetown University, and PhD in finance from Pennsylvania State University.

== Career ==
In 2014, Piwowar was one of only three Ph.D. economists to serve as an SEC commissioner, a rarity for a position normally given to lawyers. After graduating with a Ph.D. from Penn State University, Piwowar taught at Iowa State University. In 2008 and 2009, Piwowar served in the president's Council of Economic Advisers. Then he moved to the Senate, where he was a staffer for Republican senators Mike Crapo and Richard Shelby. Like his Democratic colleague at the SEC, Kara Stein, who was also a Senate staffer, Piwowar helped write the 2010 Dodd–Frank Act.

During his time at the SEC, Piwowar joined with his colleague and senior Republican Daniel Gallagher in dissenting to some of the agency's rules and enforcement actions. Piwowar has asked to observe meetings of Washington's super-regulator, the Financial Stability Oversight Council (FSOC), and criticized it as an "unaccountable capital markets death panel" that lacks transparency.

Political offices
Preceded by Mary Jo White	Chair of the Securities and Exchange Commission; Acting; 2017	Succeeded by Jay Clayton
