= Steven Peikin =

American lawyer

Steven Peikin is an American lawyer. On June 8, 2017 he was appointed as co-director of the Securities and Exchange Commission (SEC) Enforcement Division, a title he shares with Stephanie Avakian.

== Career ==
From 1996 to 2004, Peikin served as an assistant U.S. attorney, overseeing the securities and commodities task force for the Southern District of New York. The group pursues crimes including accounting fraud, insider trading and market manipulation.

Among his clients in private practice at Sullivan & Cromwell, Mr. Peikin has helped represent Barclays against accusations of sanctions violations, LIBOR manipulation and insider trading and Goldman Sachs Group, during a U.S. Senate investigation of its trading and warehousing of aluminum and other commodities. In 2015, he represented Michael Coscia, a high-frequency trader convicted of "spoofing," in the first-of-its-kind prosecution by the government.

The SEC's ethics rules bar Peikin from supervising any cases that affect Goldman or other clients of Sullivan & Cromwell for one year.

As co-chair of the division, he has cited cybercrime as one of the biggest threats to the financial markets and an enforcement priority of the agency.
