= Andy Vollmer =

American lawyer

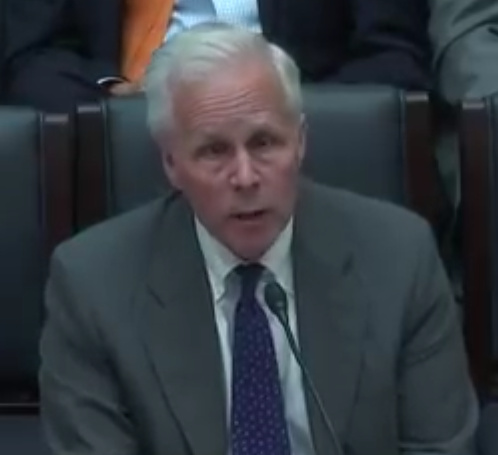

General Counsel of the United States Securities and Exchange Commission Acting
- In office January 2009 – February 2009
- President: Barack Obama
- Chair: Elisse B. Walter (acting); Mary Schapiro
- Preceded by: Brian Cartwright
- Succeeded by: David M. Becker

Personal details
- Born: Andrew Neill Vollmer; August 14, 1953 (age 73)
- Education: University of Virginia (JD); Miami University (BA)
- Occupation: Lawyer

Andrew Neill Vollmer (born August 14, 1953) is an American lawyer. He retired as partner in the securities department at law firm WilmerHale. Prior to April 2009, he had been Deputy General Counsel for the United States Securities and Exchange Commission (SEC) and acting General Counsel. He succeeded Meyer Eisenberg as Deputy General Counsel, who retired from the Commission in early January 2006 and former General Counsel Brian Cartwright who left the Commission for the private sector in January 2009.

== Education ==
Mr. Vollmer received his J.D. in 1978 from the University of Virginia School of Law, where he served as Notes Editor of the Virginia Law Review. He earned his B.A. from Miami University.

== Before the SEC ==
He was previously a partner in the international law firm of Wilmer Cutler Pickering Hale and Dorr LLP where he served as Vice Chair of the firm's Securities Department and previously served as one of two partners managing the firm's London office. He is co-author of a monograph on "Internal Corporate Investigations."

== Tenure at SEC ==
As acting General Counsel, Vollmer was quickly thrust into the news media's attention as he testified on February 4, 2009 before the United States House Committee on Financial Services subcommittee with SEC Director of the Division of Enforcement Linda Thomsen and other senior staff from the SEC and the Financial Industry Regulatory Authority (FINRA). The subject of the hearings were on why the SEC had failed to act when Harry Markopolos, a private fraud investigator from Boston alerted the Securities and Exchange Commission detailing his persistent and unsuccessful efforts to get the SEC to investigate Bernard L. Madoff, beginning in 1999. Vollmer claimed executive privilege in declining to answer some questions, and Vollmer and the other SEC officials' lack of cooperation with the enquiry was strongly criticised by Subcommittee chairman Paul Kanjorski and Representative Gary Ackerman.

On 18 February 2009, 14 days later, the SEC announced that Vollmer would 'leave the Commission and return to the private sector'. It was later announced that he would take up a post with his former firm, WilmerHale.
