= Giovanni Prezioso =

General Counsel of the US Securities and Exchange Commission

- Born: December 23, 1957; Boston, United States
- Died: February 28, 2023 (aged 65); Bethesda, Maryland
- Education: Harvard College (A.B., history and literature, magna cum laude, 1979); Harvard Law School (J.D., magna cum laude, 1982)
- Occupation: Attorney
- Known for: US Securities and Exchange Commission General Counsel
- Predecessor: David M. Becker
- Successor: Brian Cartwright
- Spouse: Elizabeth Holladay Mathews

Giovanni Prezioso (December 23, 1957-February 28, 2023) became General Counsel of the US Securities and Exchange Commission in April 2002.

Prezioso served in that post under three different chairmen; Harvey Pitt, William Donaldson, and Christopher Cox. During his tenure the SEC started over 2,000 actions and 100 rules changes. It also implemented the Sarbanes-Oxley Act of 2002. He also reduced the backlog of cases awaiting SEC resolution

In early 2006, Prezioso stepped down from the post and rejoined his prior law firm, Cleary Gottlieb Steen & Hamilton LLP, as a partner resident in the firm's Washington, DC office.

He was born in Boston to Dr. and Mrs. Fausto Maria Prezioso of Towson, Maryland. Prezioso was a graduate of Harvard College (A.B., history and literature, magna cum laude, 1979) and Harvard Law School (J.D., magna cum laude, 1982). In 1987 he married Elizabeth Holladay Mathews, a television producer, at Christ Episcopal Church in Greenwich, Connecticut.

Prezioso's bar and other professional activities included service as chairman of the American Bar Association’s Subcommittee on Municipal and Governmental Obligations, as a member of the New York Stock Exchange Rule 431 Committee, and as a member of the Global Documentation Steering Committee sponsored by the Federal Reserve Bank of New York. He was a member of the Board of Advisors of the SEC Historical Society. Prezioso was a member of the Bar of the District of Columbia.

Prezioso was an advisory editor of the University of Bologna Law Review, a general student-edited law journal published by the Department of Legal Studies of the University of Bologna.

Preceded by David M. Becker	SEC General Counsel; 2002–06	Succeeded by Brian Cartwright
