= Brian Cartwright =

American lawyer (born 1948)

- Born: 1948 (age 77–78)
- Education: Yale University; University of Chicago; Harvard University
- Occupations: Lawyer; Former astrophysicist
- Known for: SEC General Counsel 2006 - 2009

Brian G. Cartwright (born 1948) is an American lawyer and former astrophysicist. From 2006 to 2009, he was general counsel for the Securities and Exchange Commission of the USA.

== Career ==
On January 3, 2006, the SEC Commission Chair Christopher Cox officially appointed ex-Latham & Watkins partner Brian G. Cartwright as its top lawyer, replacing Giovanni Prezioso. In 2008 Cartwright announced he was leaving the SEC.

Cartwright holds a Juris Doctor from Harvard Law School, where he was president of the Harvard Law Review and winner of the Sears Prize, given every year to the first and second-year students with the highest grade point averages. He served as law clerk to U.S. Supreme Court Justice Sandra Day O’Connor from 1981 to 1982.

Before becoming a lawyer, Cartwright was an astrophysicist graduating from Yale University. He earned a Ph.D. in physics from the University of Chicago and worked as a research physicist at the University of California at Berkeley's space sciences laboratory. He published numerous articles in scholarly journals including the Astrophysical Journal.

== Personal life ==
Brian Cartwright is married with three sons.

== See also ==
- List of law clerks for the eighth seat of the Supreme Court of the United States

Preceded by Giovanni Prezioso	SEC General Counsel; 2006–2009	Succeeded by Andy Vollmer (acting)
