= USPA =

USPA may refer to:

- Ukrainian Sea Ports Authority
- United States Parachute Association
- United States Polo Association
- United States Permafrost Association, a geoscience organization
- United Services Planning Association, a former name of First Command Financial Planning
- USpA, undifferentiated spondyloarthropathy
- UspA, a type of universal stress protein
