= Andrew Maloney =

Andrew Maloney may refer to:

- Andrew J. Maloney (1931–2022), American attorney
- Andy Maloney (born 1990), New Zealand sailor
- Drew Maloney (born 1969), U.S. government official and government affairs executive

== See also ==
- Andrew Moloney (born 1991), Australian boxer
