= Committee on Capital Markets Regulation =

US nonprofit organization

- Abbreviation: CCMR
- Formation: 2006
- Type: nonpartisan research
- Purpose: Developing efficient capital markets, ensuring the stability of the financial system
- Headquarters: 134 Mt. Auburn St.
- Location: Cambridge, Massachusetts
- Key people: Hal S. Scott, Director Glenn Hubbard, Co-Chair John L. Thornton, Co-Chair
- Website: https://www.capmktsreg.org

The Committee on Capital Markets Regulation is an independent and nonpartisan 501(c)(3) research organization financed by contributions from individuals, foundations, and corporations.

== Background ==
Thirty-six leaders from the financial sector, including banks, broker-dealers, asset managers, private funds, insurance companies, and academia comprise the committee's membership. The committee co-chairs are Glenn Hubbard, dean of Columbia Business School, and John L. Thornton, chairman of the Brookings Institution. The committee's director is Professor Hal S. Scott, emeritus Nomura Professor and director of the Program on International Financial Systems at Harvard Law School. The committee's research regarding the regulation of U.S. capital markets provides policymakers with a nonpartisan, empirical foundation for public policy.

== History ==
The committee was founded in 2006 by then-Secretary of the Treasury, Henry Paulson.

=== Past recommendations ===
==== The global Financial Crisis: A Plan for Regulatory Reform ====
In 2009, the Committee determined four critical objectives based upon a year of observation and research into the 2008 financial crisis that are further broken down into 57 specific recommendations. These four objectives are:

1. Reduced systemic risk through more sensible and effective regulation.
2. Increased disclosure to protect investors and stabilize the market.
3. A unified regulatory system where lines of accountability are clear and transparency in improved.
4. International regulatory harmonization and cooperation.

==== A Blueprint for Financial Reform ====
In 2010, within a 37-page letter to Chairman Dodd, Ranking Member Shelby, Chairman Lincoln and Ranking Member Chambliss, the CCMR evaluated all major elements in the financial reform proposals that have emerged from Senate committees, but focused especially on four as areas for compromise:

1. Federal regulators must have the ability to use tax dollars (and recoup them later) to pay for the orderly resolution of failing institutions in cases where they judge the alternative would be national and/or international financial catastrophe.
2. No banks or non-banks should be labeled “systemically important.”
3. Clarity about jurisdiction over the clearing and settlement of derivatives is crucial to reducing systemic risk, as is increasing these activities.
4. The proposed independent and transparently funded Consumer Financial Protection Bureau (CFPB) should be free of overriding authority except that of the Financial Stability Oversight Council (as provided in the Dodd Bill) and the Treasury Secretary (only when he or she is acting on matters of the “safety and soundness” of the financial system, as in matters of systemic risk).

==== A Balanced Approach to Cost-Benefit Analysis Reform ====
Released in October 2013, the committee's position paper set forth a balanced approach to strengthening cost-benefit analysis requirements applicable to the independent agencies tasked with implementing regulatory reform in the U.S. financial system. The Committee outlined an approach it believed would maximize the economic efficiency of the U.S. regulatory system, minimize procedural burdens on regulators, and help insulate new rulemakings from judicial challenge.

==== The U.S. Equity Markets: A Plan for Regulatory Reform ====
In July 2016, the committee's “The U.S. Equity Markets: A Plan for Regulatory Reform” sought to inform the public and policymakers about the U.S. equity market structure and evaluate its performance for U.S. investors and public companies. The report set forth 24 recommendations that fell into three categories:

1. Increasing the transparency of U.S. equity markets
2. Strengthening the resilience of U.S. equity markets
3. Reducing transaction costs by enhancing competition

=== Recent proposals ===
==== Roadmap for Regulatory Reform ====
In May 2017, the committee's “Roadmap for Regulatory Reform” set forth priority regulatory actions for the Trump administration that would promote U.S. economic growth and enhance the stability of the U.S. financial system. The Roadmap consisted of eleven recommendation areas:

1. Conducting a cumulative assessment of regulatory impact
2. Enhancing the U.S. approach to international regulatory frameworks
3. Reexamining bank capital and liquidity requirements
4. Reducing undue regulatory burdens on community banks and regional banks
5. Simplifying and streamlining the Volcker Rule
6. Ensuring that rulemakings are adopted through a transparent and public process
7. Enhancing the process of identifying and addressing systemic risk
8. Establishing a rule of law framework for the Federal Reserve as a lender of last resort
9. Reinvigorating the stagnant U.S. IPO market
10. Reforming trading rules for the U.S. stock market
11. Reviewing the U.S. public enforcement regime

==== Rationalizing Enforcement in the U.S. Financial System ====
In June 2018, the staff of the Committee developed a comprehensive overview of the structure, operation, and transparency of the U.S. public enforcement system as it pertains to the financial system. The staff set forth recommendations in four major areas:

1. Improving coordination and cooperation between enforcement authorities
2. Rationalizing the setting of sanctions in enforcement actions
3. Ensuring the appropriate use of monetary sanctions
4. Promoting individual accountability

==== Expanding Opportunities for Investors and Retirees: Private Equity ====
In October 2018, the Committee found that private equity funds have a well-established performance history that justifies expanding access to them. It recommends three ways to do so:

1. Legislative reforms to expand access to direct investments in private equity funds
2. SEC reforms to expand access to public closed-end funds that invest in private equity funds
3. Department of Labor reforms to facilitate the ability of 401(k) plans to offer investment options that provide exposure to private equity funds.

== Committee members ==
- Gregory Babyak, global head of regulatory and policy group, Bloomberg
- Kenneth Bentsen Jr., president & CEO, Securities Industry and Financial Markets Association
- Andrew Berry, managing director, head of regulatory strategy and initiatives, Americas, UBS
- Jeffrey Brown, senior vice president legislative and regulatory affairs, Charles Schwab
- Roel C. Campos, partner, Hughes, Hubbard & Reed; former commissioner, Securities and Exchange Commission
- Jason Carroll, managing director, Hudson River Trading
- Douglas Cifu, CEO, Virtu Financial
- Allen Ferrell, Harvey Greenfield Professor of Securities Law, Harvard Law School
- John Finley, senior managing director and chief legal officer, The Blackstone Group
- Benjamin M. Friedman, William Joseph Maier Professor of Political Economy, Harvard University
- Kenneth A. Froot, André Jakurski Professor of Business Administration, emeritus, Harvard University Graduate School of Business
- Adam Gilbert, PwC financial services advisory risk & regulatory co-leader, PricewaterhouseCoopers
- Robert R. Glauber, adjunct lecturer, Harvard Kennedy School of Government; visiting professor, Harvard Law School; former chairman & CEO, NASD
- Kenneth C. Griffin, president & CEO, Citadel Investment Group LLC
- R. Glenn Hubbard, Dean & Russell L. Carson Professor of Finance and Economics, Columbia Business School; committee co-chair
- Greg Jensen, co-chief investment officer, Bridgewater Associates
- Wei Jiang, Arthur F. Burns Professor of Free and Competitive Enterprise & vice dean for curriculum and instruction dean's office, Columbia Business School
- Steven A. Kandarian, chairman, president & CEO, MetLife
- Michael Koh, head of regulatory strategy & policy, BNP Paribas
- Andrew Kurtizkes, executive vice president & chief risk officer, State Street Corporation
- Craig Lazzara, managing director and global head of index investment strategy, S&P Dow Jones Indices
- Theo Lubke, chief regulatory reform officer, Securities Division, Goldman Sachs
- Andrei Magasiner, corporate treasurer, Bank of America
- Michael Mendelson, principal, AQR
- Barbara G. Novick, vice chairman, BlackRock
- Sandra E. O'Connor, managing director, chief regulatory affairs officer, J.P. Morgan Chase
- Craig Phillips, former counselor to the secretary, United States Department of the Treasury
- Robert C. Pozen, senior lecturer, MIT Sloan School of Management
- Nancy Prior, president, Fixed Income Division, Fidelity Investments
- David Rubenstein, co-founder & co-executive chairman, The Carlyle Group
- Hal S. Scott, Nomura Professor and president of Program on International Financial Systems, Harvard Law School; Committee President
- John Shrewsberry, CFO, Wells Fargo
- Leslie N. Silverman, senior counsel, Cleary Gottlieb Steen & Hamilton LLP; committee legal advisor
- Debra Stone, managing director, head of corporate regulatory affairs J.P. Morgan Chase
- Makoto Takashima, president and CEO, Sumitomo Mitsui Banking Corporation
- John L. Thornton, chairman, The Brookings Institution; committee co-chair
- Joseph Ucuzoglu, CEO, Deloitte
- Yuqiang Xiao, chairman of ICBC US Management Committee, general manager of ICBC New York Branch, Industrial and Commercial Bank of China
- Michael Zarcone, head of corporate affairs and chief of staff to the chairman and CEO, Metlife
