= Elisse B. Walter =

American lawyer (born 1950)

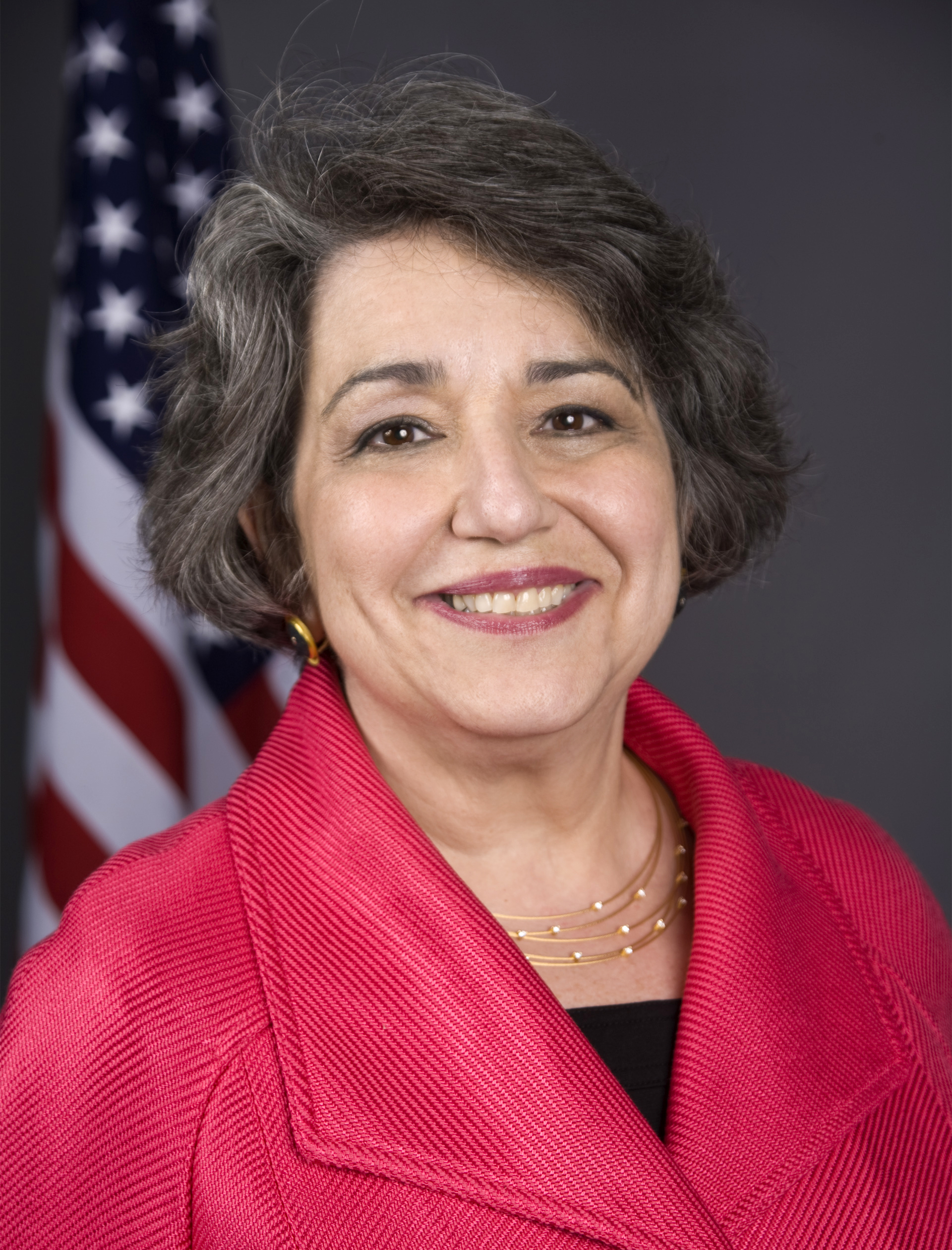

30th Chair of the Securities and Exchange Commission
- In office December 14, 2012 – April 10, 2013
- President: Barack Obama
- Preceded by: Mary Schapiro
- Succeeded by: Mary Jo White

Personal details
- Born: April 14, 1950 (age 76) New York City, New York, U.S.
- Party: Democratic
- Education: Yale University (BA); Harvard University (JD)

Elisse B. Walter (born April 14, 1950) was the 30th Chair of the U.S. Securities and Exchange Commission (SEC) from December 14, 2012 – April 10, 2013. She was appointed chair by President Barack Obama on November 26, 2012, and sworn in on December 14, 2012. She was originally appointed as one of five SEC Commissioners by President George W. Bush and sworn in on July 9, 2008. Under designation by President Obama, she later served as Acting Chair during January 2009. She served as a Commissioner of the SEC until August 9, 2013.

On January 24, 2013, President Obama nominated Mary Jo White to be Walter's successor as chair. White was confirmed by the Senate on April 8, 2013, and was sworn into office on April 10, 2013.

== Education ==
Walter was born to a Jewish family in New York City. She attended Pembroke College at Brown University in 1967 and graduated from Yale University with a B.A., cum laude, in mathematics. She received her J.D. degree, cum laude, from Harvard Law School. She graduated from Herricks High School in New Hyde Park, Long Island, NY.

== Career ==
Walter is a member of the Board of Directors of Occidental Petroleum Corporation and the Sustainability Accounting Standards Board (SASB). She also serves as a member of the board of governors of the Financial Industry Regulatory Authority (FINRA), as well as a members of the boards of directors of the FINRA Investor Education Foundation and the National Women's Law Center.

Walter held a Democratic seat on the Commission, succeeding Annette Nazareth, who left the SEC in January 2008 to work in private practice. Walter was recommended for the Commissioner position by Senate Majority Leader Harry M. Reid (D-Nev.) in 2007, along with fellow Commissioner Luis A. Aguilar. Her term on the Commission ended June 5, 2012 but she continued to serve until August 9, 2013.

Prior to her appointment as an SEC Commissioner, she served as Senior Executive Vice President, Regulatory Policy & Programs, for the Financial Industry Regulatory Authority (FINRA). She held the comparable position at the National Association of Securities Dealers (NASD) before its 2007 consolidation with NYSE Member Regulation and redesignation as FINRA. Walter coordinated policy issues across FINRA and oversaw a number of departments including Investment Company Regulation, Corporate Financing, Member Education and Training, Investor Education, Emerging Regulatory Issues, and Disciplinary Affairs. She also served on the board of directors of the FINRA Investor Education Foundation.

Prior to joining the NASD, she served as General Counsel of the Commodity Futures Trading Commission (CFTC). Before joining the CFTC in 1994, she was the deputy director of the Division of Corporation Finance at the SEC. She served on the SEC's staff beginning in 1977, both in that Division and in the Office of the General Counsel, including service as Associate General Counsel. Before joining the SEC, she was an attorney with a private law firm in Washington, DC, Arent, Fox, Kintner, Plotkin and Kahn.

Walter served on the Board of Trustees of Jewish Women International and the SEC Historical Society and is a member of the Academy of Women Achievers of the YWCA of the City of New York, according to her official biographies. She has been the recipient of a variety of honors, including the SEC Distinguished Service Award, the US Government SES Distinguished Executive Award, the Association of SEC Alumni [ASECA] William O. Douglas Award and the Federal Bar Association Manual F. Cohen Younger Lawyer and Philip A. Loomis Jr. Awards.

=== SEC chair ===
Walter became chair when her predecessor, Mary Schapiro, stepped down on December 14, 2012. Walter was serving a five-year term that ended in June 2012, but Commissioners can serve an additional 18 months after their terms end, according to a MarketWatch report at the time her appointment was announced. Even at that time, President Obama was likely to nominate someone for a full term soon thereafter, the report said. Walter "told agency officials that she plans to serve for a short time. The White House, which faces more pressing cabinet-level nominations, is expected to name an S.E.C. successor next year," the NY Times reported then.

=== Issues ===
Walter has led the SEC's in-depth review of the municipal securities markets.

In August 2008 at an opening meeting of the SEC, Walter expressed her support for the implementation of International Financial Reporting Standards for U.S. companies, but cautioned that a ruling from the SEC was far from finalized. "Most important, we have to keep in mind that no one knows for certain what the future will hold," she said. "I strongly believe that we have to prepare for the alternative that the Commission will determine not to adopt, or permit the use of, IFRS for U.S. issuers. … [T]here are significant hurdles to overcome over the next three years in order for the Commission to determine to accept IFRS reporting from U.S. issuers."

Another issue she addressed, while at the National Association of Securities Dealers, was the NASD's regulatory activities regarding inappropriate sales of certain investment products to members of the armed forces. Testifying before a congressional subcommittee in May 2006 concerning the NASD's financial education programs focused on military service members and their families, she addressed issues raised by a particular broker-dealer, First Command Financial Planning, Inc. of Fort Worth, Texas, which had been making inappropriate sales of products and services, including the sale of an investment product called Periodic Payment Plans or PPPs. First Command had targeted and sold more than a half million complicated and often extremely expensive PPPs to servicepersons. After investigation and censure, the firm was fined $12 million in December 2004. That amount included restitution, and funding for the NASD Investor Education Foundation. As of 2006, First Command informed the NASD that it has ceased selling PPPs.

== Personal ==
Walter is married to Ronald Alan Stern, who served as the chief antitrust attorney for General Electric until September 2014. They have two children. Walter has two siblings, a brother, Alan N. Walter, an attorney, and a sister, Abra J. Walter, a psychologist.

== Publications ==
- Walter, E. B., "Regulating Broker-Dealers and Investment Advisers: Demarcation or Harmonization?," Journal of Corporation Law (2009) 35(1).

== Notes ==
Political offices
Preceded by Mary Schapiro	Chair of the Securities and Exchange Commission; 2012–2013	Succeeded by Mary Jo White
