= Mary Jo White =

American attorney (born 1947)

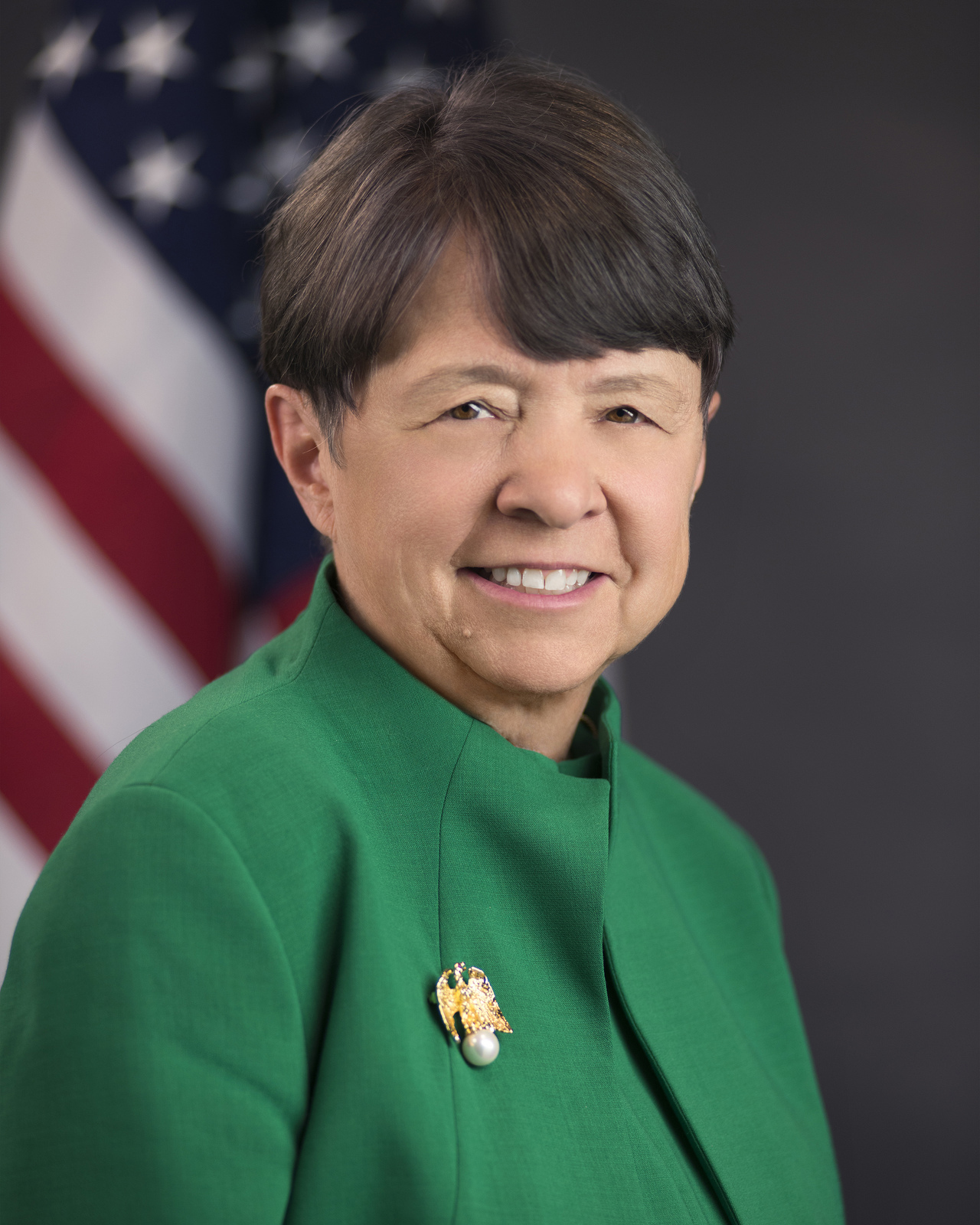

31st Chair of the U.S. Securities and Exchange Commission
- In office April 10, 2013 – January 20, 2017
- President: Barack Obama
- Preceded by: Elisse B. Walter
- Succeeded by: Michael Piwowar (acting)

United States Attorney for the Southern District of New York
- In office June 1993 – January 7, 2002
- President: Bill Clinton; George W. Bush
- Preceded by: Otto G. Obermaier
- Succeeded by: James Comey

Acting United States Attorney for the Eastern District of New York
- In office December 1992 – June 1993
- President: George H. W. Bush; Bill Clinton
- Preceded by: Andrew J. Maloney
- Succeeded by: Zachary W. Carter

Personal details
- Born: December 27, 1947 (age 78) Kansas City, Missouri, U.S.
- Party: Independent
- Spouse: John White
- Education: College of William and Mary (BA); The New School (MA); Columbia University (JD)

Mary Jo White (born December 27, 1947) is an American attorney who served as the 31st chair of the Securities and Exchange Commission (SEC) from 2013 to 2017. She was the first woman to be the United States Attorney for the Southern District of New York, serving from 1993 to 2002. On January 24, 2013, President Barack Obama nominated White to replace Elisse B. Walter as Chair of the U.S. Securities and Exchange Commission. She was confirmed by the Senate on April 8, 2013, and was sworn into office on April 10, 2013. In 2014, she was listed as the 73rd most powerful woman in the world by Forbes.

On November 14, 2016, White announced she would step down from her SEC position at the end of the president's term. In her subsequent return to private practice she represented criminal defendants including Les Wexner, an associate of Jeffrey Epstein, and the Sackler family, owners of opioid manufacturer Purdue Pharma. She is now the senior chair at Debevoise & Plimpton in New York City.

== Early life and education ==
White was born in Kansas City, Missouri, in 1947, the daughter of Carl Monk and Ruth King. Her father was a Social Security Administration lawyer, born in Oklahoma and educated at the University of Oklahoma, before receiving his law degree from George Washington University. He was a Free Mason, who died of cancer in 1989. Her mother was a homemaker, born in Miami, Oklahoma. White claims to be of Cherokee descent. In the 1950 U.S. Census from Kansas City, White's name was listed as Mary Joe.

White grew up in McLean, Virginia. She received a Bachelor of Arts from the College of William & Mary in 1970. She earned a Master of Arts in psychology in 1971 from The New School for Social Research and a Juris Doctor from Columbia Law School in 1974, where she was a Writing & Research Editor of the Columbia Law Review.

== Career ==
White became acting United States Attorney for the Eastern District of New York in December 1992, and in March 1993 was appointed by President Bill Clinton as U.S. Attorney for the Southern District. She is noted for having led the prosecution of John Gotti and overseen those of the terrorists responsible for the 1993 World Trade Center bombing, chief among them Sheik Omar Abdel Rahman and Ramzi Yousef.

After President Bill Clinton's controversial last-day presidential pardons, she was appointed by new Attorney General John Ashcroft to investigate Marc Rich's pardon.

For 10 years, she was chair of the litigation department at Debevoise & Plimpton, whose self-proclaimed "core practices" and expertise are focused on the success of Wall Street financial firms. The Huffington Post called her "a well-respected attorney who won high-profile cases against mobsters, terrorists and financial fraudsters over the course of nearly a decade as the U.S. attorney for Manhattan".

It has been asserted in Rolling Stone magazine that, among other duties at Debevoise, White has used her influence and connections to protect certain Wall Street CEOs from prosecution, including a notable case involving the firing of Gary J. Aguirre for investigations into the CEO of Morgan Stanley executive John J. Mack.

In 2013, White, as a lawyer for JSTOR, an original complainant in the prosecution of Aaron Swartz, asked the lead prosecutor to drop the charges after JSTOR changed their position to oppose Swartz's prosecution because of steps Swartz had taken to appease JSTOR.

=== Chair of the SEC ===
When White started at the SEC in April 2013, most of the agency's enforcement cases from the 2008 financial crisis were either settled or near completion, freeing up resources for other work. In a shift for the agency, White announced in June 2013 the SEC would start demanding more admissions of misconduct as part of an enforcement settlement. In an October 2013 speech, White announced a new SEC enforcement tactic practiced by neighborhood beat police to root out petty crime. In her speech, White cited a March 1982 Atlantic article, espousing law enforcement's "broken windows" concept that theorizes enforcing small, petty crimes—like smashed windows—can prevent bigger crimes. Focusing enforcement attention to these small crimes avoids breeding an environment of indifference to the rules, White said.

During her tenure, White had to recuse herself from some of the SEC's biggest enforcement cases as a result of her prior work at Debevoise and that of her husband, John W. White, a lawyer at Cravath, Swaine & Moore. By February 2015 White had recused herself in about 50 cases setting up deadlock situations within the Commission and thus, per a report, compromised the effectiveness of the SEC.

On November 14, 2016, White announced that she would step down from the SEC after nearly four years service at the end of President Obama's term in January 2017. She earned, in the immediate wake of her announcement, a complimentary overall review of her term as an independent regulator from the Wall Street Journal despite differences the editors had had with her. The editorial contrasted White's service to that of others "in one of history's most ideological Administrations", as it termed the Obama presidency.

==== Criticism of White's leadership at the SEC ====
On June 2, 2015, Senator Elizabeth Warren wrote a letter to White indicating that her "leadership of the Commission has been extremely disappointing" pointing out numerous shortcomings and failures during her tenure. Warren admonished that White failed to finalize certain Dodd–Frank rules, did not curb the use of waivers for companies that violated securities laws, allowed settlements without admission of guilt, and was too frequently recused because of her husband's activities. In return, White argued that the agency had been effective and that Warren had mischaracterized her statements and the accomplishments of the agency. The Massachusetts senator's attack on White generated backlash from the White House, Congress, and Wall Street, with defenders calling her a tough but fair enforcer of the rules.

In June 2016, at a Senate hearing, Senator Warren asked White about her projects to reduce corporate disclosures. Senator Warren then declared she was "more disappointed than ever".

On October 14, 2016, Senator Warren sent a formal written request to President Obama asking for the immediate dismissal of White as Chair of the SEC because of her refusal to develop public disclosure rules of political contributions made by corporations.

=== Return to private practice ===
Following her departure as Chair of the SEC, White rejoined Debevoise & Plimpton in February 2017. In that same year, White was a member of a National Football League's external expert advisory panel on domestic violence, reviewing allegations against Ezekiel Elliott. He was suspended for six games in the 2017 season.

In 2017, White was retained by the University of Rochester to investigate professor T. Florian Jaeger, by whom sixteen students had complained of being sexually harassed. White's firm was hired to conduct an independent investigation but proceeded without any input from the plaintiffs from the case, due to their pending litigation. White's team broke confidentiality agreements with witnesses by making public names that they had promised would remain confidential. Based on White's legal opinion that no laws had been broken, the University of Rochester argued that the case should be dismissed. The judge, however, sided with the plaintiffs in a 58-page ruling which "repeatedly knocked down specific rebuttals from the university" including White's claims. The case later settled with the plaintiffs with no-fault admitted for $9.4 million.

In August 2018, White chaired the investigation related to Ohio State's football coach Urban Meyer's denials of knowing about domestic violence committed by one of his former assistant coaches, Zach Smith.

In August 2019, White was retained by Les Wexner as a criminal defense attorney in matters to the investigation of Jeffrey Epstein. During the release of the Epstein files, it was revealed Epstein plotted a public relations strategy against Senator Elizabeth Warren for her contempt of White's tenure at the SEC.

Throughout her career, White has represented members of the Sackler family and Purdue Pharma in litigation brought by victims of the opioid epidemic. In 2006, White, along with Rudy Giuliani, pressured the Department of Justice not to pursue criminal charges against key executives in Purdue Pharma. Mary Jo White’s advocacy meant that Purdue was able to aggressively continue to sell OxyContin across the United States. White continued to represent Purdue Pharma after this, advocating for a settlement in bankruptcy court that would have absolved the Sackler Family of any criminal liability from their role in the opioid epidemic. That settlement was overturned by the Southern District of New York in December 2021.

In 2021 she was on the defense team for the SEC's case against Ripple Labs.

In 2022, the National Football League confirmed that White had been hired to investigate allegations of misconduct and financial impropriety against Washington Commanders owner Dan Snyder.

== Personal life ==
White is married to John White, with a son David. John White is a lawyer.

Legal offices
Preceded by Andrew J. Maloney	United States Attorney for the Eastern District of New York; Acting; 1992–1993	Succeeded by Zachary W. Carter
Preceded by Otto G. Obermaier	United States Attorney for the Southern District of New York; 1993–2002	Succeeded by James Comey
Political offices
Preceded by Elisse B. Walter	Chair of the United States Securities and Exchange Commission; 2013–2017	Succeeded by Michael Piwowar; Acting
