= Hal S. Scott =

Hal S. Scott (born 1943) is the director of the Committee on Capital Markets Regulation, Co-Chair of the Council on Global Financial Regulation, an independent director of Lazard, Ltd., a member of the Bretton Woods Committee. He is a past President of the International Academy of Consumer and Commercial Law and a past Governor of the American Stock Exchange (2002–2005).

He is the Nomura Professor and Director of the Program on International Financial Systems at Harvard Law School, where he has taught since 1975. He teaches courses on Capital Markets Regulation, International Finance, the Payment system, and Securities regulation.

Professor Scott's books include the law school textbook International Finance: Transactions, Policy and Regulation (19th ed. Foundation Press 2012); International Finance: Law and Regulation (3rd ed. Sweet and Maxwell 2012) and The Global Financial Crisis (Foundation Press 2009).

Professor Scott has a B.A. from Princeton University (Woodrow Wilson School, 1965), an M.A. from Stanford University in Political Science (1967), and a J.D. from the University of Chicago Law School (1972). In 1974-1975, before joining Harvard as a professor, Scott clerked for Justice Byron White. When reviewing Scott's transcript, White found that Scott had gotten a D grade in his constitutional law class and jokingly remarked that "we do some of that here."

== See also ==
- List of law clerks for the sixth seat of the Supreme Court of the United States
