= Leo Gottlieb (lawyer) =

American lawyer

- Born: June 21, 1896
- Died: September 26, 1989; New York City, U.S.
- Education: Harvard University
- Occupation: Lawyer
- Children: 1

Leo Gottlieb (June 21, 1896 – September 26, 1989) was an American lawyer. He worked for Root, Clark, Buckner & Howland from 1920 to 1946, and Cleary Gottlieb Steen & Hamilton from 1946 to 1974. He was the president of the New York Lawyers' Association in the early 1960s.

Gottlieb is the namesake of the Leo Gottlieb Professorship of Law at the Harvard Law School, formerly held by Senator Elizabeth Warren.
