= Christopher Cox =

American lawyer and politician (born 1952)

Chris Cox
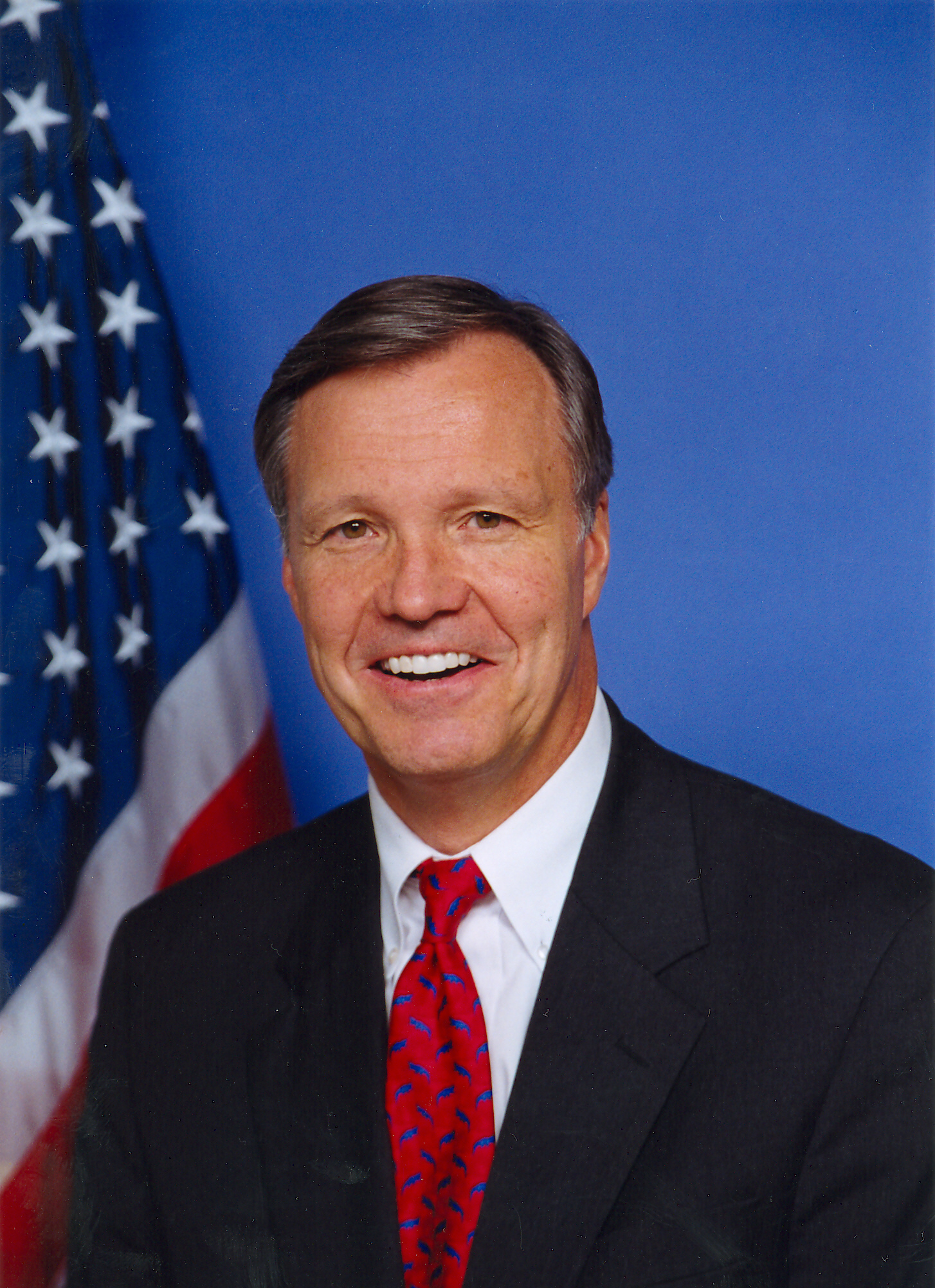
- Official portrait, 2005

28th Chair of the Securities and Exchange Commission
- In office August 3, 2005 – January 20, 2009
- President: George W. Bush
- Preceded by: William H. Donaldson
- Succeeded by: Mary Schapiro

Chair of the House Homeland Security Committee
- In office January 3, 2003 – August 2, 2005
- Preceded by: Dick Armey
- Succeeded by: Peter T. King

Chair of the House Republican Policy Committee
- In office January 3, 1995 – January 3, 2005
- Leader: Newt Gingrich; Dennis Hastert
- Preceded by: Henry Hyde
- Succeeded by: John Shadegg

Member of the U.S. House of Representatives from California
- In office January 3, 1989 – August 2, 2005
- Preceded by: Robert Badham
- Succeeded by: John Campbell
- Constituency: 40th district (1989–1993); 47th district (1993–2003); 48th district (2003–2005)

Personal details
- Born: Charles Christopher Cox; October 16, 1952 (age 74) Saint Paul, Minnesota, U.S.
- Party: Republican
- Spouse: Rebecca Gernhardt
- Education: University of Southern California (BA); Harvard University (JD, MBA)

Charles Christopher Cox (born October 16, 1952) is an American attorney and politician who served as chair of the U.S. Securities and Exchange Commission, a 17-year Republican member of the United States House of Representatives, and member of the White House staff in the Reagan Administration. Prior to his Washington service he was a practicing attorney, teacher, and entrepreneur. Following his retirement from government in 2009, he returned to law practice and currently serves as a director, trustee, and advisor to several for-profit and nonprofit organizations.

== Early life and education ==
Cox was born in St. Paul, Minnesota. After graduating from Saint Thomas Academy in Mendota Heights, Minnesota in 1970, Cox earned a Bachelor of Arts degree in English and political science from the University of Southern California in 1973, following an accelerated three-year course. He was also a member of Delta Tau Delta fraternity. In 1977, he earned both an MBA from Harvard Business School and a J.D. from Harvard Law School, where he was an editor of the Harvard Law Review.

== Career ==
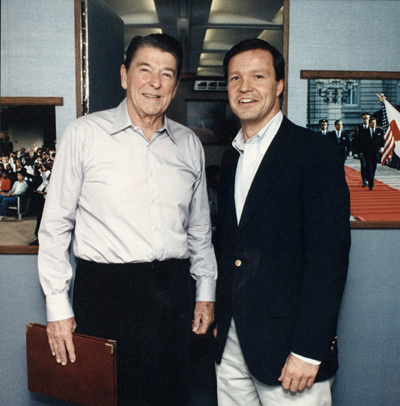
Cox with President Ronald Reagan aboard Air Force One in 1986

From 1977 to 1978, he served as law clerk to Judge Herbert Choy of the U.S. Court of Appeals for the Ninth Circuit.

In October 1978, Cox was paralyzed from the waist down following a serious off-road Jeep accident in the rainforest on the Hawaiʻian island of Molokaʻi. He eventually regained the ability to walk but wore a harness of steel bars and leather straps for six months. He still has two metal screws in his back, and according to a 2005 Fortune magazine profile, “has been in pain every day for the past 27 years.” Since he can't sit for extended periods of time, he has a special desk that allows him to work while standing.

As a contestant on the NBC-TV game show Password Plus, Cox won more than $5,000 over multiple appearances. According to a re-broadcast of Password Plus on the cable network GSN, Cox appeared in 1980 and won $5,400 cash.

From 1977 to 1986, Cox was first an associate and then partner with the international law firm of Latham & Watkins. At the time of his retirement in 1986 he was the Partner in Charge of the Corporate Department in the Orange County office, and served as a member of the firm's national management. In 1982–83, Cox took a leave of absence from Latham & Watkins to teach federal income tax at Harvard Business School.

In 1984, Cox co-founded Context Corporation, which produced daily English reproductions of the leading Soviet state-controlled newspaper, Pravda. The publication was used chiefly by U.S. universities and U.S. government agencies, and was eventually distributed to customers in 26 countries around the world. The company had no connection to the Soviet government.

=== White House ===
During the second term of Ronald Reagan from 1986 to 1988, Cox served as senior associate counsel to the president. His duties included advising on the nomination of three Supreme Court justices, the establishment of the Brady Commission following the 1987 market crash, and the drafting of legislative reform proposals for the federal budget process.

In 1986, following Chief Justice Warren Burger's confidential message to President Reagan that he planned to step down from the bench, White House Counsel Peter Wallison tasked a small team including Cox with thoroughly researching the opinions and judicial philosophies of the leading candidates for the next Supreme Court nomination. The effort focused on judges of the U.S. Court of Appeals who had a substantial record of decisions. After narrowing the field to five or six, the search quickly settled on Judge Antonin Scalia of the U.S. Court of Appeals for the D.C. Circuit, a recommendation the president accepted.

As a part of his White House responsibilities, Cox also reviewed the FBI files of nominees for presidential appointments.

When Howard Baker took over for Donald Regan as chief of staff in 1987, bringing with him Arthur B. Culvahouse Jr. as counsel to the president, First Lady Nancy Reagan specifically asked Culvahouse to keep Cox on the White House staff. According to Culvahouse, she and the East Wing staff "liked Chris a lot ... He is a very good lawyer," and his willingness to give up his partnership in a prestigious law firm to join the White House staff only a year before had made an impression. As senior associate counsel under Culvahouse, Cox became deeply involved in market issues and securities issues including then-pending congressional proposals for legislation on insider trading, greenmail, junk bonds, golden parachutes and golden handcuffs, tender offers, and takeovers.

His work on the White House response to the 1987 stock market crash included the formation of the Presidential Task Force on Market Mechanisms and the recruitment of Harvard Business School professor Robert Glauber, who had been Cox's department chairman during his stint on the faculty there, as its executive director. The Commission provided the definitive autopsy on what happened to the markets on Black Monday, October 19, 1987, and its aftermath. Coincidentally, eight months prior to the crash, Chief of Staff Howard Baker had asked Cox to write a detailed memo describing the emergency powers that the President might exercise in a market crisis. That landed Cox in an emergency meeting in the chief of staff's office on Black Monday, from which Baker called then-NYSE Chairman John Phelan to urge him to drop his plan to shut down the New York Stock Exchange.

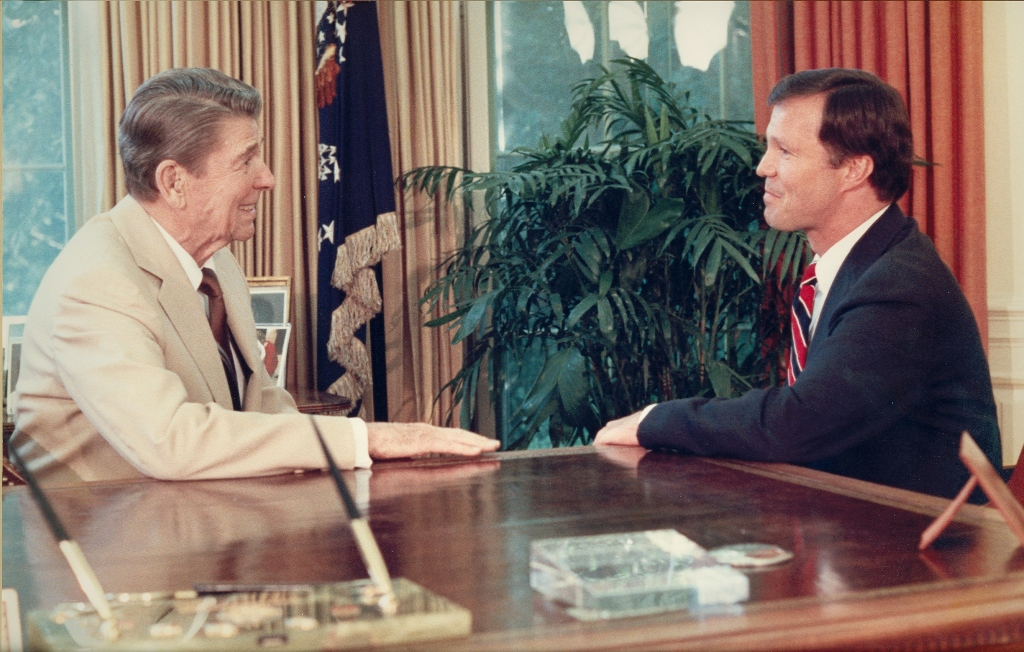
Senior Associate Counsel Christopher Cox and President Reagan confer in Oval Office, 1988

At the time, some conservatives were pushing for a constitutional convention to advance a balanced budget amendment, and Cox conducted research on the question. He represented the White House at hearings on the advisability of releasing John Hinckley from St. Elizabeth's Hospital following Hinckley's attempted assassination of President Reagan, and led the vetting and research effort that resulted in Northwestern Law School Dean David Ruder being recommended to the president as SEC Chairman in 1987.

A former soccer player at USC, as a White House counsel Cox worked with the United States Soccer Federation on its proposal to bring the World Cup to the United States in 1994. “He was a key. Everybody in the damned government had their fingers in this,” said Eddie Mahe, who ran the U.S. Soccer Federation's 1986 campaign to bring the event to the United States. “Without him, I don’t know that it would have survived.” According to the Los Angeles Times, soccer's governing body was requiring waivers of federal laws and regulations from virtually every agency of the federal government, and in "record time, Cox prepared an executive order directing the agencies to fall in line. Reagan signed it." On July 5, 1988, the U.S. won the selection bid. In appreciation, the U.S. team presented Cox with the first jersey to be signed by all 22 members.

=== U.S. House of Representatives ===
Cox was elected to Congress in 1988 from what was then California's 40th congressional district. He was re-elected eight more times from this Orange County-based district, which was renumbered as the 47th District in 1993 and the 48th District in 2003.

Early in his congressional career, Cox befriended two anti-Communists in Hungary and Lithuania who had been prisoners of conscience and who later became presidents of their countries after the end of Soviet domination. Cox met Árpád Göncz in 1989, and when Cox was later married, he spent part of his honeymoon in Hungary with then-President Göncz and his wife Mária Zsuzsanna Göntér. Cox met Dr. Vytautas Landsbergis, a professor at the Conservatory of Music in Vilnius, in 1989, well before the successful reestablishment of Lithuanian independence. The night Landsbergis was elected President of Lithuania, he embraced Cox on the tarmac at the airport in Vilnius after the Soviet Union had held Cox in East Berlin for a prolonged period. In May 1998, Cox was presented with the Order of the Lithuanian Grand Duke Gediminas, the highest honor the Republic of Lithuania can give to a living noncitizen.

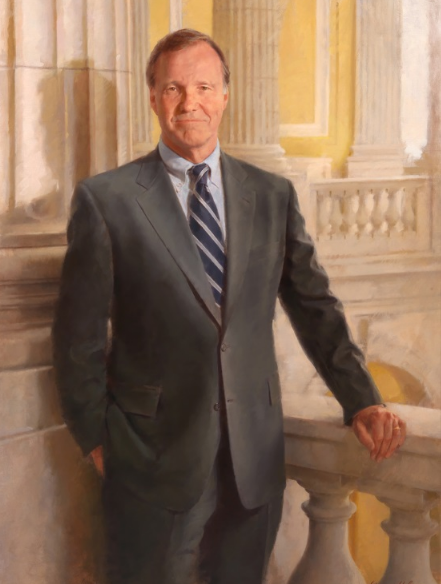
Official Congressional portrait of Homeland Security Committee Chairman Christopher Cox

In 1989, Polish President Lech Wałęsa joined Cox in a Washington, DC ceremony marking the enactment of Cox's legislation establishing the Polish-American Enterprise Fund. Together with the Baltic-American Enterprise Fund, the Hungarian-American Enterprise Fund, and seven other enterprise funds in Central and Eastern Europe and the former Soviet Union, the Cox legislation, incorporated in the Support Eastern European Democracy (SEED) Act, matched U.S. foreign aid with venture capital in the newly free countries of the former Warsaw Pact. Cox has some fluency in the Russian language.

In 1994, Cox was appointed by President Clinton to the Bipartisan Commission on Entitlement and Tax Reform, which in 1995 published a unanimous report warning that the nation cannot continue to allow entitlement programs to consume a rapidly increasing share of the federal budget.

Among Cox's notable legislative successes as a Representative was the Internet Tax Freedom Act, a 1998 law prohibiting federal, state, and local government taxation of Internet access and banning Internet-only levies such as email taxes, bit taxes, and bandwidth taxes. With U.S. Rep. Barney Frank (D-MA) as his chief co-sponsor, Cox authored legislation in 1997 to privatize the National Helium Reserve, which was then $1.4 billion in debt to taxpayers. As of 2004, this was the third-largest privatization in U.S. history, surpassing the value of the 1988 Conrail privatization. Cox also wrote the only law that was enacted over President Bill Clinton's veto, the Private Securities Litigation Reform Act of 1995, aimed at protecting investors from fraudulent and extortionate lawsuits.

Honoring Cox by David Dreier and others

For 10 of his 17 years in the Congress, from 1995 to 2005, Cox served in the House Majority Leadership as Chairman of the House Republican Policy Committee, the fifth-ranking elected leadership position (behind the Speaker, the Majority Leader, the Majority Whip, and the Chair of the House Republican Conference). He was Chairman of the House Committee on Homeland Security, and also Chairman of the Select Committee on U.S. National Security that produced the Cox Report, an indictment of Chinese espionage and of security failures at several U.S. national laboratories.

When Congress established the Bipartisan Study Group on Enhancing Multilateral Export Controls through federal legislation in 1999, Cox was tapped as co-chairman. The group published a unanimous report in 2001 recommending wholesale modernization of U.S. export controls. Cox also served as Chairman of the Select Committee on Homeland Security (the predecessor to the permanent House Committee); Chairman of the Task Force on Capital Markets; and Chairman of the Task Force on Budget Process Reform.

In the spring of 2001, then-Representative Cox was considered by President George W. Bush for a federal appellate judgeship on the U.S. Court of Appeals for the Ninth Circuit. Cox withdrew his name from consideration before a nomination could be made because one of his home state Democratic Senators, Barbara Boxer, objected to him due to his perceived conservatism. The seat that Cox had been considered for was eventually filled by Bush nominee Carlos Bea.

=== U.S. Securities and Exchange Commission ===
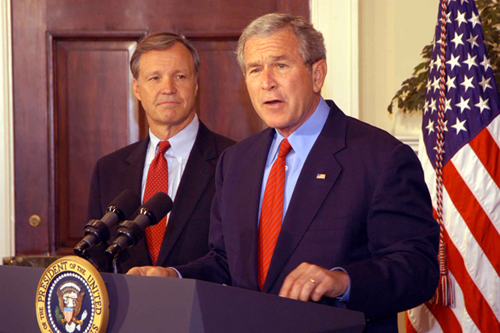
Cox with President George W. Bush in 2005

Cox was nominated by President George W. Bush to be the 28th chairman of the United States Securities and Exchange Commission (SEC) on June 2, 2005, and unanimously confirmed by the United States Senate on July 29, 2005. He was sworn in on August 3, 2005, the day after his resignation from Congress.

Shortly after becoming SEC Chairman, he was diagnosed with thymoma, a rare form of cancer, and underwent surgery in January 2006 to remove a tumor from his chest. He returned to work "after several weeks recovering from surgery," according to The Associated Press. (The cancer returned 10 years later, but Cox was again given a clean bill of health after surgery and treatment.)

In May 2008, Cox delivered the Commencement Address at Northeastern University in Boston, Massachusetts. In April 2008, he received the University of Southern California's highest award, the Asa V. Call Achievement Award, in a ceremony at the Los Angeles Millennium Biltmore Hotel.

The Housing and Economic Recovery Act of 2008, enacted in July 2008, gave Cox one of five seats on the Federal Housing Finance Oversight Board, which advises the Director of the Federal Housing Finance Agency with respect to overall strategies and policies regarding the safety and soundness of Fannie Mae, Freddie Mac, and the Federal Home Loan Banks. In September 2008, the U.S. Congress passed and President Bush signed the Emergency Economic Stabilization Act of 2008, which placed Cox on the newly established Financial Stability Oversight Board to oversee the $700 billion Troubled Assets Relief Program.

==== Regulatory initiatives ====
During his tenure, Cox led the Commission to implement new executive compensation rules. Since the early 1990s, support for reform had been growing, urged by the U.S. Financial Accounting Standards Board and others. Relying in part on FASB's recommendations for improved presentation of compensation information, the Cox reforms made it possible for users of financial statements to readily understand how public company executives are compensated. Newly required information included the lump-sum cost of retirement benefits and explanations of why specific stock option grants were approved. The New York Times observed that the Commission "largely stood its ground amid pressure from compensation specialists, investor advocates, and industry groups." With more than 20,000 comment letters, Cox said, "No issue in the history of the SEC has generated such interest."

One of his first initiatives was launching a plain English effort, to eliminate legalese in investor communications in favor of clear language that let investors focus on what was important, the better to hold a company's performance up to the light of day. Not only the executive compensation rules, but also disclosure rules for investment advisors and mutual funds—where more than half of U.S. households had their retirement and college savings—were subjected to the plain English requirements. Under Cox the SEC wrote new rules requiring the $10.6 trillion mutual fund industry to make their prospectuses easier for investors to read, understand, and access.

Cox defended the 2002 Sarbanes–Oxley Act and resisted efforts to repeal it or scale it back legislatively. The greatest source of complaint about the law during his tenure was its Section 404, which produced compliance expenses far higher than the SEC under his predecessor had predicted. Working with the Public Company Accounting Oversight Board, the SEC under Cox replaced the original auditing standard for Section 404 with a streamlined, more cost-effective version, and also provided new guidance for management intended to reduce unnecessary costs. At Cox's direction the agency undertook a nationwide Small Business Cost-Benefit Study to determine whether, as intended, the new auditing standard and management guidance had made compliance less expensive and better focused the 404 process on control elements that truly matter for companies of all sizes.

In June 2007 the Commission voted unanimously to repeal the so-called "uptick rule" or "tick test." The action was not controversial at the time: it was taken after an extensive multi-year study by the Office of Economic Analysis, begun in 2003 under Chairman Bill Donaldson. The study found that the rule—which had never applied on NASDAQ or to ECNs and other trading systems—had been rendered ineffective on the NYSE due to decimalization (that is, the reduction of the "tick" increment to a penny, as compared to the 1/8 or 12½¢ that was in effect when the rule was adopted in 1938). Its repeal later became the subject of much debate, with some advocating its reinstatement. On July 15, 2008, Cox told a U.S. House hearing that the Commission was studying the potential institution of "a price test that could work with an increment of a nickel or dime" or some more meaningful amount.

==== Technological modernization ====
Technological modernization of the SEC was a Cox priority throughout his tenure. He introduced new technology for investor disclosure, compliance analytics, nationwide investigative work sharing, and management of funds recovered for investors. In August 2008 he rolled out the future replacement of the SEC's forms-based disclosure database, called EDGAR, with a new interactive disclosure system using computer-tagged data in the eXtensible Business Reporting Language (XBRL). The new system was designed to let future investors easily search, sort, and recombine information to generate reports and analysis from hundreds of thousands of companies and millions of forms. Under Cox the SEC oversaw the creation of a taxonomy of over 11,000 XBRL data tags that catalog every element of U.S. Generally Accepted Accounting Principles. In 2008 the Commission issued rules requiring all publicly traded companies and mutual funds in the United States to tag their financial information.

Another Cox technology initiative liberalized the proxy rules to allow investors and companies to use Electronic Shareholder Forums—virtual meeting places on the Internet to promote shareholder initiatives, conduct straw polls, apprise a company's directors of critical shareholder concerns, and inform shareholders of management's and directors' views.

In 2006 the SEC launched a war against Internet financial spam, shutting down trading in companies that touted their stock by clogging investors’ in-boxes. Investor complaints about the practice fell from more than 220,000 per month in December 2006 to 70,000 per month in February 2007; Internet software and services company Symantec credited the SEC with cutting financial spam by 30 percent.

These technological initiatives were widely supported, with one observer noting that Cox "earned virtually universal plaudits for efforts to modernize technology, transparency, and understandability of corporate reports, and to provide for apples-to-apples comparisons (for the first time ever) of corporate executive compensation."

==== Individual investors and seniors ====
The particular needs of senior investors, whose ranks are growing rapidly, was a special Cox focus. In April 2006, the SEC held its first “Seniors Summit”, working with AARP, the Financial Industry Regulatory Authority, the North American Securities Administrators Association, and several state regulators; the conferences are now held annually. A nationwide sweep examination conducted by the SEC and authorities in seven states found that "free lunch" investment seminars, which draw large numbers of retirees, routinely involved significant fraud. Many were advised to put their retirement funds into equity-indexed annuities, where they could get stock market returns while keeping their money “safe”. But neither these investments, nor the sales agents, were registered with state or federal securities regulators—and investors were frequently unaware that it would be impossible to get their money back for as much as 15 years without paying a stiff penalty. The SEC enacted rules in 2008 to protect seniors and other investors from fraudulent and abusive practices in annuities sales.

==== International integration ====
During Cox's tenure the SEC significantly expanded its international activity. Between 2005 and 2008, Cox signed supervisory arrangements covering enforcement and regulatory cooperation with regulators in the United Kingdom, France, the Netherlands, Belgium, Portugal, Australia, Germany, Bulgaria, and Norway. As Chairman of the International Organization of Securities Commissions' Technical Committee, he led international efforts to converge U.S. GAAP and International Financial Reporting Standards. In December 2007, the SEC adopted rules to permit foreign issuers to use IFRS without reconciliation to U.S. GAAP. And in November 2008, the SEC issued a roadmap – with clear milestones along the way — that would lead to a Commission decision as early as 2014 on whether or not U.S. public companies should be required to use IFRS. Cox also initiated a mutual recognition process for foreign regulators, based on an assessment of whether the securities regulatory system in another country produces comparably high-quality results for investors, including in the area of enforcement. In August 2008 he executed an arrangement with the Australian Securities & Investments Commission under which the SEC could approve exemptions allowing Australian-registered securities exchanges to operate in the U.S. without having also to register with the SEC, and U.S. exchanges would have the same privilege in Australia. As of 2008, the SEC was in mutual recognition discussions with regulators in Canada, and also in preliminary discussions with the Committee of European Securities Regulators.

==== Law enforcement ====
International enforcement also stepped up considerably under Cox. In 2008, the SEC made 556 requests of foreign regulators for assistance with SEC investigations, many of which were connected to potential wrongdoing in the subprime market. Among the significant international cases the Commission brought during this period were the highly publicized 2008 charges against Hong Kong-based insider trading in Dow Jones prior to its acquisition by News Corporation. Under Cox the SEC also brought the largest number of cases in its history charging corporations and their officers with foreign bribery under the Foreign Corrupt Practices Act and imposed record penalties for these cases.

Overall, enforcement was Cox's stated priority beginning in 2005 and throughout his chairmanship. He moved quickly to settle the debate over whether it was legitimate to impose penalties on corporations, adopting a policy that made clear the SEC "isn't turning out to be the corporate-friendly place that many in the boardroom set were hoping for." Within the SEC budget, as of 2008, he had increased the share devoted to enforcement to its highest level in 20 years. Nonetheless, the SEC's overall appropriation was held steady during two of his budget years, first by a Republican and then a Democratic Congress, and it was increased by only 2% in a third year. These sub-inflation agency budgets, combined with merit pay increases for staff, caused the total enforcement personnel to decline. Critics attacked the underfunding of the SEC and blamed Cox, though Congress and the administration clearly shared the responsibility. When the agency budget was finally increased in fiscal 2008, he increased enforcement personnel by 4%.

Beginning early in his chairmanship he focused the agency's enforcement efforts on stock option backdating, an illicit practice that had been exposed after the 2002 Sarbanes–Oxley Act changed the rules regarding the reporting of stock option grants. Under Cox the SEC investigated more than 160 stock option backdating cases, aided by the fact that the reporting forms for stock option disclosure were among the first to be mandated in “interactive data” format. Some of these cases were noteworthy for their size: in December 2007 the agency won $468 million in a settlement for stock option backdating against the former chairman and CEO of UnitedHealth Group.

Cox also aggressively used the agency's “Fair Funds” authority to distribute funds recovered from securities law violators directly to injured investors. By February 2008 the SEC had returned more than $3.5 billion to wronged investors, including more than $2 billion in 2007 alone. To expedite the return of the funds, cut red tape and lower costs, Cox created a new Office of Collections and Distributions. A few weeks later, in May 2008, the new Office began sending more than $800 million in Fair Funds to harmed investors in American International Group, Inc. (AIG), which settled SEC charges of financial fraud. In 2006 the Commission obtained a $350 million penalty from Fannie Mae after accusing it of accounting fraud; the penalty was one of the largest in Commission history. The following year the Commission charged Freddie Mac with accounting fraud and recovered a $50 million penalty.

As the 2008 credit crunch spread to municipal finance, the auction rate securities market froze, leaving investors without access to their cash. The SEC immediately investigated the largest firms in the market and entered into settlements that were the largest in the history of the SEC, amounting to up to $30 billion to injured investors.

Cox also targeted municipal securities fraud. In April 2008 the SEC charged five former San Diego city officials with securities fraud involving billions in undisclosed pension liabilities that had placed the city and taxpayers in serious financial jeopardy. Throughout his chairmanship he railed against the inadequacy of disclosure to investors in municipal securities, which the SEC does not regulate, and asked Congress for explicit authority for the agency to do so. In December 2008, the SEC under his leadership authorized the creation of a free, Internet-accessible repository for municipal finance disclosure. "With liquidity problems of municipal auction rate securities and rating downgrades of municipal bond insurers contributing to the current credit crisis, the disclosure and transparency of the municipal markets have never been more critical," he said.

In late December 2008, following the confession by New York investment advisor Bernard Madoff and the filing of SEC charges against him alleging a $50 billion fraud, Cox stated that he was "gravely concerned" that "specific and credible evidence" provided to the agency over a period of at least 10 years had not previously been referred to the Commission for commencement of a formal investigation. He ordered an internal investigation by the agency's Inspector General. The report found that substantive allegations concerning Madoff were first brought to the SEC in 1992.

==== Response to the beginning of the 2008 U.S. recession ====
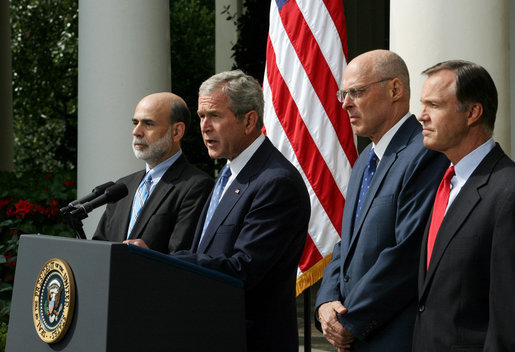
Cox, Hank Paulson, and Ben Bernanke watch as President George W. Bush delivers a statement on the economy in 2008

Under his leadership, the SEC on September 17 and 18, 2008, imposed a variety of both permanent and emergency restrictions on short selling in response to the liquidity crisis. Abusive naked short selling, in which the seller intentionally fails to deliver the shares sold short in time for settlement, was banned outright, an exception for options market makers that had been in place for several years was eliminated, and a new anti-fraud provision, Rule 10b-21, was adopted to give specific enforcement authority in such cases. In September 2008, short selling of 799 financial stocks was temporarily curtailed in response to rumors accompanied by heightened short selling activity in the shares of major financial institutions.

On September 26, 2008, Cox ended the 2004 program for voluntary regulation of investment bank holding companies, begun under SEC Chairman William Donaldson and then-Director of Market Regulation (later SEC Commissioner) Annette Nazareth. The program "was fundamentally flawed from the beginning, because investment banks could opt in or out of supervision voluntarily," Cox said. A critical report by the SEC inspector general that evaluated the program in light of the Bear Stearns near-failure in March 2008 found that while "Bear Stearns was compliant with the capital and liquidity requirements" at the time of its acquisition, "its collapse raises serious questions about the adequacy of these requirements." However, according to the Inspector General, his report "did not include a determination of the cause of Bear Stearns' collapse" or determine "whether any of these issues directly contributed to Bear Stearns' collapse." On that subject, the report stated, "we have no evidence linking these significant deficiencies with the cause of Bear Stearns' collapse." Cox criticized the oversight program on the ground that because of its voluntary nature and the SEC's limited statutory authority, the agency could not force changes in the hundreds of unregulated subsidiaries of large investment banks such as Goldman Sachs, Morgan Stanley, Merrill Lynch, Lehman Brothers and Bear Stearns as bank regulators could do with bank holding companies. In testimony before Congress on several occasions in 2008, he asked for statutory authority to regulate investment bank holding companies.

In addition to the fact that the Gramm-Leach-Bliley Act did not give the SEC the authority to regulate large investment bank holding companies, Cox noted that investors were vulnerable to other regulatory gaps such as the fact that the $60 trillion market for credit default swaps was then completely unregulated. "Neither the SEC nor any regulator has authority even to require minimum disclosure", he said. In testimony and public statements he urged Congress to enact remedial legislation.

Cox said that during the buildup of the 2008 financial crisis, when the credit rating agencies were still unregulated, they gave top credit ratings to financial instruments which packaged risky loans and spread the negative impacts of the 2008 financial crisis more broadly throughout the markets. Following the first-time SEC registration of the credit rating agencies in September 2007 under newly enacted legislative authority, he ordered a 10-month examination of the three major rating agencies that uncovered significant weaknesses in their ratings practices for mortgage-backed securities and that called into question the impartiality of their ratings. The results were reported to Congress in July 2008. The SEC immediately commenced a rulemaking which concluded on December 3, 2008, with approval of a series of measures to regulate the conflicts of interests, disclosures, internal policies, and business practices of credit rating agencies. The regulations were intended to ensure that firms provide more meaningful ratings and greater disclosure to investors concerning collateralized debt obligations and residential mortgage-backed securities.

In an interview with The Washington Post in late December 2008, Cox said, "What we have done in this current turmoil is stay calm, which has been our greatest contribution—not being impulsive, not changing the rules willy-nilly, but going through a very professional and orderly process that takes into account unintended consequences and gives ample notice to market participants." Cox added that the Commission's decision to impose a three-week ban on short selling of financial company stocks was taken reluctantly, but that the view at the time, including from Treasury Secretary Henry M. Paulson and Federal Reserve chairman Ben Bernanke, was that "if we did not act and act at that instant, these financial institutions could fail as a result and there would be nothing left to save." In a December 2008 interview with Reuters, he explained that the SEC's Office of Economic Analysis was still evaluating data from the temporary ban, and that preliminary findings pointed to several unintended market consequences and side effects. "While the actual effects of this temporary action will not be fully understood for many more months, if not years ... knowing what we know now, I believe on balance the Commission would not do it again."

Cox stepped down as Chairman of the SEC at the end of the Bush administration, on January 20, 2009.

=== Later career ===
External videos
- Presentation by Cox on Woodrow Wilson: The Light Withdrawn, November 12, 2024, C-SPAN
- Washington Journal interview with Cox on Woodrow Wilson, December 30, 2024, C-SPAN
- Q&A interview with Cox on Woodrow Wilson, May 18, 2025, C-SPAN

Following his tenure at the SEC, Cox returned to his home in Southern California and the practice of law, which had been his pre-Washington profession. He joined the Boston-based international law firm of Bingham McCutchen LLP as a partner in the firm's Corporate, M&A and Securities practice, resident in its Orange County office, where in 2014 The Best Lawyers in America named him Lawyer of the Year in the Corporate Governance category. He also served as president of Bingham Consulting LLC, the firm's global strategic consulting business. Following the November 2014 combination of Bingham and the Philadelphia-based international law firm of Morgan, Lewis & Bockius, Cox became a partner of Morgan Lewis and president of Morgan Lewis Consulting LLC. Other recent members of Morgan Lewis Consulting include former Arizona Diamondbacks and San Diego Padres owner Jeff Moorad, former National Labor Relations Board chairman Philip Miscimarra, former New Hampshire Governor Steve Merrill, former California Governor and U.S. Senator Pete Wilson, former Clinton White House Cabinet Secretary Thurgood Marshall Jr., and former U.S. Ambassador to Ukraine and George Bush Presidential Library Executive Director Roman Popadiuk. While at Morgan Lewis, Cox was again named by The Best Lawyers in America as Lawyer of the Year in Orange County, this time in the Corporate Law category for 2016. In February 2020, Cox retired as a partner of Morgan Lewis and as president of Morgan Lewis Consulting, taking the title of counsel at the law firm.

Cox is a member of the board of directors of Revitate, an investor in real estate, sports, and consumer products, and of NetChoice, an internet industry association. He is a life trustee of the University of Southern California and a member of the advisory boards of New York-based Blue Flame AI and the Loker Hydrocarbon Research Institute, founded by Nobel Prize winner George A. Olah. He serves as Chair of the Rhodes Scholarship selection committee for Southern California, and is a Senior Scholar in Residence at the University of California, Irvine. He formerly served on the boards of directors of photonics manufacturer Newport Corporation, governance, risk, and compliance firm ACA Group, and health care companies RxSight, Inc., Alphaeon Corporation, and Calhoun Vision, Inc., as well as the advisory boards of private equity firm Starr Investment Holdings, RevOZ Capital, the United States Energy Security Council, and governance, risk, and compliance firm Thomson Reuters Accelus. He is a member of the board of directors of the Forum for Corporate Directors and a past chair. For ten years, he was a member of the board of directors of the National Endowment for Democracy, and of the board of trustees of Chapman University.

The Forum for Corporate Directors honored Cox as a "Director of the Year" in March 2019 in the category of Corporate Governance. In June 2014, Cox was named a "Father of the Year" by the Father's Day Council and the American Diabetes Association in recognition of his "outstanding contributions to his family, profession and community."

== Book ==
In 2024, Simon & Schuster published Cox's book Woodrow Wilson: The Light Withdrawn, which Cox spent fourteen years researching and writing. The book takes a sharply critical view of Wilson and his views on race and gender.

== Electoral history ==
Christopher Cox electoral history

1988 United States House of Representatives elections in California
Party	Candidate	Votes	%
Republican	Chris Cox	181,269	67.1
Democratic	Lida Lenney	80,782	29.9
Libertarian	Roger Bloxham	4,539	1.7
Peace and Freedom	Gretchen J. Farsai	3,699	1.4
Independent	Write-ins	87	0.0
Total votes		270,376	100.0
Republican hold			

1990 United States House of Representatives elections in California
Party	Candidate	Votes	%
Republican	Chris Cox (Incumbent)	142,299	67.6
Democratic	Eugene Gratz	68,087	32.4
Total votes		210,376	100.0
Republican hold			

1992 United States House of Representatives elections in California
Party	Candidate	Votes	%
Republican	Chris Cox (Incumbent)	165,004	64.9
Democratic	John F. Anwiler	76,924	30.3
Peace and Freedom	Maxine Bell Quirk	12,297	4.8
Independent	Barry Charles (write-in)	32	0.0
Total votes		244,257	100.0
Republican hold			

1994 United States House of Representatives elections in California
Party	Candidate	Votes	%
Republican	Chris Cox (Incumbent)	154,071	71.7
Democratic	Gary Kingsbury	53,669	25.0
Libertarian	Victor A. Wagner, Jr.	7,257	3.3
Total votes		214,997	100.0
Republican hold			

1996 United States House of Representatives elections in California
Party	Candidate	Votes	%
Republican	Chris Cox (Incumbent)	160,078	65.7
Democratic	Tina Laine	70,362	28.9
Natural Law	Iris Adam	6,573	2.8
Libertarian	Victor Wagner	6,530	2.6
Total votes		243,777	100.0
Republican hold			

1998 United States House of Representatives elections in California
Party	Candidate	Votes	%
Republican	Chris Cox (Incumbent)	132,711	67.6
Democratic	Christina Avalos	57,938	29.5
Libertarian	Victor A. Wagner, Jr.	2,991	1.5
Reform	Raymond O. Mills	1,369	0.7
Natural Law	Paul Fisher	1,307	0.7
Total votes		196,316	100.0
Republican hold			

2000 United States House of Representatives elections in California
Party	Candidate	Votes	%
Republican	Chris Cox (Incumbent)	181,365	65.7
Democratic	John Graham	83,186	30.1
Libertarian	David F. Nolan	8,081	2.9
Natural Law	Iris Adam	3,769	1.3
Total votes		276,401	100.0
Republican hold			

2002 United States House of Representatives elections in California
Party	Candidate	Votes	%
Republican	Christopher Cox (Incumbent)	122,884	68.5
Democratic	John Graham	51,058	28.4
Libertarian	Joe Michael Cobb	5,607	3.1
Total votes		179,549	100.0
Republican hold			

2004 United States House of Representatives elections in California
Party	Candidate	Votes	%
Republican	Christopher Cox (Incumbent)	189,004	65.0
Democratic	John Graham	93,525	32.2
Libertarian	Bruce Cohen	8,343	2.8
Total votes		290,872	100.0
Republican hold			

U.S. House of Representatives
Preceded by Robert Badham	Member of the U.S. House of Representatives from California's 40th congressional district 1989–1993	Succeeded by Jerry Lewis
New constituency	Member of the U.S. House of Representatives from California's 47th congressional district 1993–2003	Succeeded by Loretta Sánchez
New office	Chair of the Select Committee on U.S. National Security and Military/Commercial Concerns with the People's Republic of China; 1998–1999	Position abolished
Preceded by Darrell Issa	Member of the U.S. House of Representatives from California's 48th congressional district 2003–2005	Succeeded by John Campbell
Preceded by Dick Armey	Chair of the House Homeland Security Committee; 2003–2005	Succeeded by Peter T. King
Party political offices
Preceded by Henry Hyde	Chair of the House Republican Policy Committee; 1995–2005	Succeeded by John Shadegg
Government offices
Preceded by William H. Donaldson	Chair of the Securities and Exchange Commission; 2005–2009	Succeeded by Mary Schapiro
U.S. order of precedence (ceremonial)
Preceded by Steve Gunderson as Former U.S. Representative	Order of precedence of the United States as Former U.S. Representative	Succeeded by Jane Harman as Former U.S. Representative
