= GFANZ =

Glasgow Financial Alliance for Net Zero

The Glasgow Financial Alliance for Net Zero (GFANZ) is a group that formed during the COP26 climate conference in Glasgow, and describes itself as "a global coalition of leading financial institutions committed to accelerating the decarbonization of the economy."

Michael Bloomberg, UN Special Envoy on Climate Ambition and Solutions, and Mark Carney, UN Special Envoy for Climate Action and Finance, are Co-Chairs of the group, while Mary Schapiro is the Vice Chair and Head of the Secretariat.

The group aims to support the goal of the Paris Agreement to limit global temperature increases to 1.5 °C and "provides the tools and resources the financial sector needs to implement its net-zero commitments." The group comprised over 160 companies with more than $70 trillion of assets, however several have now withdrawn from the group. Companies that join the alliance must be accredited by the UN Race to Zero campaign and must also "use science-based guidelines to reach net zero emissions, cover all emission scopes, include 2030 interim target setting, and commit to transparent reporting and accounting in line with the UN Race to Zero criteria."

The Alliance also comprises existing and new net zero finance initiatives like the Net Zero Asset Managers Initiative, the UN-convened Net-Zero Asset Owner Alliance and the Net-Zero Banking Alliance.

== Criticism ==
In October 2022 it was reported that two pension funds, Cbus Super and Bundespensionskasse, and a consulting company had left the Alliance due to new rules on membership requiring reductions in fossil fuel investments. The divisions among GFANZ members came following "heavy criticism over the lack of climate action by GFANZ's leading members, most notably U.S. and Canadian banks and large investment managers." Former US Vice President Al Gore said that "it's become apparent that some who made impressive pledges did not immediately begin to put in place a practical plan to fulfil those pledges."

The Financial Times reported that the UN's Race to Zero "introduced tougher criteria in June, including a bar on support for new coal projects. Existing corporate members will be required to comply with the latest criteria from June next year."

Following this, Bloomberg reported that GFANZ "faced possible defections from firms including JPMorgan Chase & Co., Morgan Stanley and Bank of America Corp" who were unhappy with proposed binding restrictions on fossil finance from the UN's Race to Zero group. GFANZ released a statement saying that the proposals would not bind GFANZ members, "essentially giving them the freedom to ignore such proposals", according to Bloomberg. According to the Financial Times, Race to Zero had been "officially relegated... to the status of one adviser among many".

The NGO Global Witness has stated that GFANZ does not require financial institutions to stop funding deforestation: "Despite widespread recognition of the role of forests in climate change, having a climate policy or a 'net zero' commitment by 2050 will not require a financial institution to stop bankrolling deforestation. In fact, they could in principle meet a Net Zero commitment – as currently defined by GFANZ – and still be funding the rampant destruction of rainforests.

In November 2022, Global Witness published analysis showing that GFANZ members retained "forest-risk investments worth an estimated $8.5 billion", and had reduced their exposure to companies accused of deforestation by "a minuscule decline of just over 3%".
