= Otto G. Obermaier =

American lawyer (1936–2025)

United States Attorney for the Southern District of New York
- In office October 16, 1989 – February 1, 1993
- President: George H. W. Bush
- Preceded by: Rudy Giuliani
- Succeeded by: Mary Jo White

Personal details
- Born: April 16, 1936 New York City, U.S.
- Died: September 26, 2025 (aged 89) Fairfax County, Virginia, U.S.
- Spouse: Patricia Favier (m. 1961)
- Children: 4
- Education: Manhattan College (AB); Georgetown University (LLB)

Otto George Obermaier (April 16, 1936 – September 26, 2025) was an American lawyer who served as the United States Attorney for the Southern District of New York from 1989 to 1993. He was appointed to this position by George H. W. Bush.

== Background ==
Obermaier was born and raised in Manhattan, New York. He graduated from Xavier High School and then received a bachelor's degree in electrical engineering from Manhattan College. After this Obermaier became an examiner for the United States Patent Office and studied law at the Georgetown University Law Center. He later served as a law clerk to Judge Richard H. Levet.

== Career ==
In 1964, Obermaier became an assistant United States Attorney in the Southern District of New York, working under U.S. Attorney Robert M. Morgenthau. Among the cases Obermaier prosecuted was that of Johnny Dioguardi a member of the Lucchese criminal family. He subsequently entered private practice as a defense attorney, primarily in white collar cases.

Obermaier served for a time as a chief trial counsel for the Securities and Exchange Commission. He was also an associate counsel to the Knapp Commission.

In 1989, Obermaier was chosen to serve as U.S. Attorney in the Southern District of New York, succeeding Rudy Giuliani. According to The New York Times, he was noted for his cautious approach which stood in stark contrast to Giuliani's more bombastic style. Giuliani felt that Obermaier's work as a white collar defense lawyer made him inappropriate for the job. Nevertheless, Obermaier was confirmed and spent four years in the role, leaving the post on February 1, 1993.

In 2006, Obermaier established a law firm with John S. Martin Jr., also a former United States Attorney for the Southern District of New York.

== Personal life and death ==
In 1961, Obermaier married Patricia Favier, with whom he had four children. He died at a care home in Fairfax County, Virginia, on September 26, 2025, at the age of 89 from complications after a fall.
