= Leslie N. Silverman =

Leslie N. Silverman is a partner with the international law firm of Cleary Gottlieb Steen & Hamilton LLP Silverman also serves as a member of the Committee on Capital Markets Regulation.

== Biography ==
His specialization is domestic and international capital markets, particularly cross-border offerings and development of new financial products, and counseling regarding compliance with the Sarbanes-Oxley Act and related corporate governance matters.

He is a member of the bars in New York and the District of Columbia, and is admitted to practice before the U.S. Court of Appeals, Second Circuit, and the U.S. District Court for the Southern District of New York.

Silverman joined the firm in 1974 and became a partner in 1982. From 1985 to 1989, he was resident in the London office. He served as law clerk to Chief Judge Irving R. Kaufman of the U.S. Court of Appeals for the Second Circuit.

Silverman is a published author, having had a hand in works including "Raising Capital Through OTC Equity Derivatives: The Goldman, Sachs & Co. Interpretive Letter."

- U.S. Regulation of the International Securities and Derivatives Markets (contributor) (Aspen Publishers, December 2003) - ISBN 978-0-7355-4218-1
- The Sarbanes-Oxley Act: Analysis and Practice (contributor) (Aspen Publishers, September 2003) - ISBN 978-0-7355-4492-5

Silverman received a J.D. degree from Yale Law School in 1973. He also received an undergraduate degree from the Wharton School of the University of Pennsylvania.
