= Andrew J. Maloney =

American attorney (1931–2022)

Andrew J. Maloney (October 6, 1931 – August 15, 2022) was an American attorney. He was the United States Attorney for the Eastern District of New York from 1986 to 1992. During his time as United States Attorney, Maloney's office was able to successfully acquire an indictment and conviction against boss of the Gambino crime family, John Gotti. His office also successfully indicted and convicted Lucchese crime family boss Victor Amuso. In addition to members of the American Mafia, Maloney's office also indicted and convicted New York State Assembly Speaker Mel Miller. In December 1992, Maloney resigned as United States Attorney. He died in August 2022. He was a resident of Mamaroneck, New York. Maloney was a graduate of the United States Military Academy and Fordham University School of Law.

Legal offices
Preceded by Reena Raggi; Acting	United States Attorney for the Eastern District of New York; 1986–1992	Succeeded by Mary Jo White; Acting
