= Cleary Gottlieb Steen & Hamilton =

Law firm based in New York City

Cleary Gottlieb Steen & Hamilton LLP
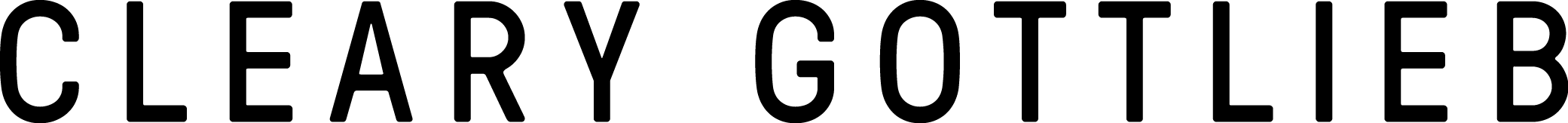
- Headquarters: One Liberty Plaza; New York City
- No. of offices: 17
- No. of attorneys: 1,050+
- Major practice areas: General practice
- Key people: Michael Gerstenzang, Senior partner; Jeffrey D. Karpf, Managing partner
- Revenue: ▲$1.7 billion (2024)
- Date founded: 1946; 80 years ago
- Founder: Henry Friendly; Leo Gottlieb
- Company type: Limited liability partnership
- Website: clearygottlieb.com

Cleary Gottlieb Steen & Hamilton LLP (formerly Cleary, Gottlieb, Friendly & Cox and Cleary, Gottlieb, Friendly, Steen & Hamilton, and known as Cleary Gottlieb) is an American multinational white shoe law firm. It is headquartered at One Liberty Plaza in New York City, with over 1,000 lawyers practicing worldwide.

== History ==
The firm was founded in 1946, when six partners from Root, Clark, Buckner & Howland left to found a firm, Cleary, Gottlieb, Friendly & Cox. One of those partners was Henry Friendly, whose name was removed from the firm's name after he was appointed as a judge on the United States Court of Appeals for the Second Circuit in 1959, as is customary.

In August 2007, Manhattan federal judge Loretta Preska imposed monetary sanctions on Cleary Gottlieb for improperly trying to dissuade a witness, French-Congolese businessman Medard Mbemba, from testifying in Kensington International Ltd. v. Republic of Congo, in which Kensington, which was trying to collect on a nearly $57 million judgement against Congo and Cleary Gottlieb was representing Congo.

The firm has been more active on large merger and acquisitions deals involving Russian companies under sanctions or restrictions than any other law firm since 2010. Until 2022, the firm advised Russian state-owned energy groups Rosneft and Gazprom.

In November 2023, amid a wave of antisemitic incidents at elite U.S. law schools, Cleary Gottlieb Steen & Hamilton was among a group of major law firms who sent a letter to top law school deans warning them that an escalation in incidents targeting Jewish students would have corporate hiring consequences. The letter said "We look to you to ensure your students who hope to join our firms after graduation are prepared to be an active part of workplace communities that have zero tolerance policies for any form of discrimination or harassment, much less the kind that has been taking place on some law school campuses."

In March 2025, the firm acquired Springbok AI, a legal technology company.

Jeffrey Karpf was elected as managing partner, effective January 2026, succeeding Michael Gerstenzang, who became the firm's senior partner.

== Offices ==
The New York office is situated in One Liberty Plaza, across the street from the World Trade Center site. The Washington office is located at 2112 Pennsylvania Avenue, five blocks northwest of the White House.

== Notable lawyers ==
Some of the notable attorneys who have practiced at Cleary, Gottlieb, Steen & Hamilton LLP include U.N. Ambassador and senior diplomat George W. Ball, Judge Henry Friendly, and Melvin Steen. Current notable attorneys include former two-time SEC general counsel David M. Becker; former president of the New York City Bar Association Evan A. Davis; former SEC general counsel Giovanni Prezioso; a former FDIC general counsel; former Acting U.S. Attorneys for the Southern District of New York Lev L. Dassin and Joon Kim; and capital markets lawyer Leslie N. Silverman.

Alumni of Cleary Gottlieb include: Secretary of the Treasury Robert Rubin; a U.S. Supreme Court Justice; a President of the U.N. General Assembly; former RNC Chairman Michael Steele; Harvard Law School professor David Kennedy; Yale Law School professor Amy Chua; author Susan Cain; U.S. National Security Council Director for Russia; Belgium's Ambassador to the United States; Darren Walker, President of the Ford Foundation; and Renaud Laplanche, founder of Lending Club; David W. Leebron, President, Rice University; Jessica Neuwirth, Founder and co-president, ERA Coalition.

== Notable clients and cases ==
Cleary Gottlieb has been engaged in several cases involving the restructuring of sovereign debt. Most recently, they have represented Greece, the Republic of Congo and the Ivory Coast. Other notable cases include:

- Advised Argentina in the 2005 restructuring of its $81.8 billion global debt, and in 2012 it represented Greece in the largest ever sovereign-debt restructuring and the largest ever bond exchange. But in 2014, a number of commentators criticized the firm severely for its handling of the Argentinian debt case.
- In 2011, represented the Chinese company Sichuan Hongda Group in its $3 billion investment in Tanzania, a joint venture with Tanzania's National Development Corporation (NDC) that constituted the largest investment venture in East Africa to date.
- In 2007, legal adviser to T-Mobile in its $2.4 billion merger with SunCom Wireless.
- Defended the Republic of Congo in litigation in the United States arising from attempts to garnish Congo's oil royalties.
- Represented Mittal Steel Czech subsidiary in ICC arbitration claim brought by Dutch contractor.
- Advised Google in its acquisition of Motorola Mobility.
- In 2012, provided legal counsel to T-Mobile US and Deutsche Telekom in connection with T-Mobile US's merger with Sprint Corporation.
- In 2012, international counsel to The Hellenic Republic in connection with its invitation, launched on February 24, relating to approximately €206 billion face amount of Greek bonds held by private sector holders, the largest ever sovereign debt restructuring and the largest ever bond exchange.
- In 2014, represented Russia in the case of Yukos, a company that the Russian government had broken up in 2003, after arresting its owner, Mikhail Khodorkovsky, on charges of tax evasion. Courts in several countries later ruled that the Russian government's real intent was to destroy Yukos, seize its assets, and punish Khodorkovsky, a political enemy. The largest arbitration award in history, $50 billion, was won by Yukos' former owners against Russia. In April 2016, a Dutch Court of the Hague overturned the award.
- In 2014, retained by the government of Puerto Rico, to help in the restructuring of its $72 billion public debt
- In 2017, represented The Dow Chemical Company on the antitrust aspects of its $130 billion merger of equals with DuPont, the third-largest ever.
- In 2018, represented the Walt Disney Company and 21st Century Fox on antitrust matters related to Disney's $71.3 billion acquisition of 21st Century Fox assets.
- In 2018, advised on the $146 Billion Sprint T-Mobile merger.
- Starting in 2022, represents Alphabet in their compliance with the EU's Digital Markets Act.

== Buchheit and collective action clauses ==
Reuters reported in 2012 that Cleary Gottlieb had become a leading legal adviser in sovereign-debt restructurings and attributed much of that position to partner Lee C. Buchheit, who had led restructuring negotiations for 20 countries. The news agency also noted that Buchheit's academic writings and legal work helped address gaps created by the absence of a formal international bankruptcy regime for sovereign states.

In 2002, Buchheit and legal scholar Mitu Gulati published Sovereign Bonds and the Collective Will, examining how provisions in existing sovereign-bond contracts and United States legal procedures could be used to facilitate more orderly debt restructurings. Reuters subsequently credited Buchheit with developing a modern form of collective action clause under which a restructuring approved by a supermajority of bondholders becomes binding on all holders, including creditors that voted against it.

In 2013, Buchheit was one of six authors of the Brookings Institution report Revisiting Sovereign Bankruptcy. Among its proposals was the coordinated adoption of stronger aggregated collective action clauses allowing a supermajority of creditors across multiple bond issues to approve a restructuring.

== See also ==
- List of largest United States-based law firms by profits per partner
