= Robert R. Glauber =

American academic (1939–2021)

- Born: March 22, 1939; Manhattan, New York, US
- Died: February 14, 2021 (aged 81); Brookline, Massachusetts, US
- Occupation: Academic
- Known for: Investigation into the 1987 stock market crash; capital market reforms

Robert Rudolf Glauber (March 22, 1939 – February 14, 2021) was an American academic who was a lecturer at Harvard's Kennedy School of Government and a visiting professor at the Harvard Law School. He was the former chairman, president, board member and chief executive officer of NASD, and Under Secretary of the Treasury for Domestic Finance from 1989 to 1992. Glauber was executive director of the task force appointed by President Reagan to report on the 1987 stock market crash. He was also a director of Moody's Corporation, a trustee of the International Accounting Standards Committee Foundation; and director of XL Capital Ltd. Glauber had been a senior advisor at Peter J. Solomon Co., an investment bank, since November 2006 and was a member of the Committee on Capital Markets Regulation. He received his degrees from Harvard College and Harvard Business School.

== Early life ==
Glauber was born on March 22, 1939, in Manhattan, New York. His father, E. Robert Glauber, was an executive at a chain of men's hat stores. Glauber grew up on the Upper East Side of Manhattan. He graduated magna cum laude from Harvard University in 1961, starting out with math before graduating with an economics major. He went on to complete his PhD from the Harvard Business School in 1964.

== Career ==
Glauber started his career as a member of the faculty at Harvard Business School in 1964 and continued here until he was called to Washington, D.C. as the executive director of the Task Force appointed by President Reagan to report on the 1987 stock market crash. The team was chartered with a sixty-day goal of identifying the root cause of the stock market crash on October 19, 1987, an event that was called Black Monday. Working with a group that included academics, computer science experts, and Wall Street experts, the task force produced a 350-page report that attributed the crash to computer-driven automated orders and trading. One of the outcomes of the recommendations was the introduction of circuit breakers that would automatically halt trading when certain volume or price targets were breached.

Glauber joined the Treasury Department as the Under Secretary of the Treasury for Domestic Finance in 1989 in the George H. W. Bush administration, when Nicholas Brady was the Treasury Secretary, and served in this position through 1992. During his time at the department, he helped develop legislation driving regulatory changes for at risk savings and loans associations. The approved legislation in 1989, created the Resolution Trust Corporation, a government owned asset management corporation that would sell assets claimed from these S&L associations. He also drafted proposals in 1991, that aimed to repeal depression-era regulations that prevented banks from diversifying into a range of adjacent financial services. The proposals did not pass Congress.

Glauber returned to the academic circuit back in 1992, when he came back as a lecturer at the Harvard's Kennedy School of Government and was later a visiting professor at the Harvard Law School.

He was the chairman, president, board member and chief executive officer of NASD (now called FINRA), the American private sector regulator of financial markets, between 2000 and 2006. During his time as the CEO, he led the organization's transition to a non-profit organization focused on driving market regulations. This was also the period when NASD divested its ownership in Nasdaq and American Stock Exchange, and improving its finances towards pursuing regulatory actions, set up the TRACE bond price transparency systems, and drove new rules around conflict of interest declarations for analysts. The organization also led investor education programs to drive financial literacy amongst market participants.

Glauber was on the board of directors of Moody's Corporation, the Federal Reserve Bank of Boston, Freddie Mac, Northeast Bank, and XL Capital Ltd., and a trustee of the International Accounting Standards Committee Foundation. He had been a senior advisor at Peter J. Solomon Co., an investment bank, since November 2006 and was also a member of the Committee on Capital Markets Regulation.

== Personal life ==
Glauber met his future wife, Barbara Winter, when she was studying at Boston University. The couple married in 1978 and went on to have two children. He was noted to have loved opera, including those by Giuseppe Verdi and Richard Wagner, having made multiple visits to England and Germany, stating that one could watch the same opera "infinite times".

Glauber died at his home in Brookline, Massachusetts, on February 14, 2021. He was aged 81 and had been diagnosed with pancreatic cancer.
