= David M. Becker =

American lawyer at the Securities and Exchange Commission (1947–2026)

David Becker
- Born: June 7, 1947
- Died: May 29, 2026
- Education: Columbia University (BA, JD)

David M. Becker (1947–2026) was an American lawyer and a partner of Cleary Gottlieb. He was twice General Counsel and Senior Policy Director of the United States Securities and Exchange Commission (SEC).

== History ==
Becker graduated from Columbia College (1968) and Columbia University Law School (1973), where he was editor-in-chief of the Columbia Law Review. He then was a law clerk for Judge Harold Leventhal of the U.S. Court of Appeals for the District of Columbia Circuit, then a year later, for Justice Stanley Reed of the U.S. Supreme Court.

He served from January 2000 to May 2002, after joining SEC staff as Deputy General Counsel in 1998, then, again, beginning in 2009, after resigning as a partner of Cleary Gottlieb. He resigned the second posting in 2011.

SEC Inspector General H. David Kotz discovered that, despite having a conflict of interest, Becker had worked on the Madoff investment scandal investigation; specifically, the Becker family had received a $2 million inheritance previously invested in a Madoff account. Kotz referred the matter to the U.S. Justice Department's criminal division. Becker indicated that he had notified seven senior SEC officials about the account, including the Chairman and the SEC's ethics officer, and none suggested that he recuse himself. Becker stated:

I have seen Inspector General Kotz do this before, make a big fuss... about sending reports to the Justice Department. Nothing has happened in any of them, and some of them ... from my time at the SEC were laughable.

The Justice Department declined to pursue the matter.

SEC chairwoman Mary Schapiro then stated about the incident, "I wish that Mr. Becker had recused himself, absolutely."

On September 22, 2011, Becker testified before the Oversight and Investigations Subcommittee of the House Committee on Financial Services and the TARP, Financial Services and Bailouts of Public and Private Programs Subcommittee of the House Committee on Oversight and Government Reform about his role in advising the SEC related to the bankruptcy of Bernard L. Madoff Investment Securities.

In 2011, Becker rejoined Cleary Gottlieb as a partner.

== See also ==
- List of law clerks for the sixth seat of the Supreme Court of the United States
