= First Command Financial Services =

American investment management firm

First Command Financial Services, Inc.
- Type: Privately held companies
- Industry: Financial Planning
- Founded: 1958
- Headquarters: Fort Worth, Texas
- Key people: Mark Steffe (President and CEO)
- Products: Mutual Funds, banking, life insurance
- Number of employees: 1000
- Website: www.firstcommand.com

First Command Financial Services, Inc. is a privately-held financial services company headquartered in Fort Worth, Texas. It provides financial planning, investment advisory, brokerage, insurance and banking services, primarily serving military families. The Registered Investment Advisor broker-dealer is registered with the U.S. Securities and Exchange Commission (SEC), the Financial Industry Regulatory Authority (FINRA), all 50 states, and the District of Columbia. It is a member of the Securities Investor Protection Corporation (SIPC). Its subsidiary entities include First Command Advisory Services, First Command Brokerage Services, Inc., First Command Insurance Services, Inc. and First Command Bank.

== Business model ==
First Command provides personalized services through locally based trained and licensed Financial Advisors and through its Home Office in Fort Worth, Texas. The company has a long history of working with military officers and currently offers advice on securities, with an emphasis on mutual funds, annuities, life insurance, and municipal funds (including Section 529 Plans). Through related companies, it offers insurance and banking products and services. As of December 31, 2019, First Command had 178 offices worldwide, with 487 Financial Advisors serving 280,173 client families with $30.0 billion in managed accounts and mutual funds, and $60.2 billion in life insurance coverage in force. 84 percent of First Command’s Financial Advisors were veterans or military spouses, and 74% of client families were active duty or retired/separated military.

First Command provides complimentary financial plans for all active duty U.S. military service members. First Command states its Mission as “coaching those who serve in their pursuit of financial security.”

The current president and CEO is Mark Steffe, who originally joined the company in March 2010. Scott Spiker, who joined the company in 2007, became executive chairman in January 2020 after having been CEO since 2008.

== History ==
=== Early years ===
"First Command" was founded in 1958 by Carroll Payne, a retired military officer who realized that military families needed assistance in planning for their financial futures. Payne wanted to create a company that recognized and dealt with the unique circumstances applicable to United States military personnel.

The company began as a broker/dealer called United Services Investment Association Inc. (USIA), which later became United Services Planning Association Inc. (USPA). USIA’s membership in the NASD (now FINRA) was approved on Jan. 21, 1959. In 1963, USPA began offering financial plans to its clients, designed to promote long-term saving and investing. Dollar cost averaging and a pay-yourself-first approach were also used to encourage clients to invest on a regular basis. In the mid-1960s, USPA expanded its product offerings to include life insurance, leading to the creation of the Independent Research Agency for Life Insurance, Inc. (IRA).

In 1970, USPA and IRA began operating under the combined name of USPA&IRA, a name which remained in use for the next three decades.

=== International expansion and corporate growth ===
In 1979, the company opened its first office outside the continental U.S., in Hawaii; three years later international operations began with an office in Germany. A charitable foundation, now known as the First Command Educational Foundation, began in 1983.

Payne died in 1984 and was succeeded by Ralph Smith, who was chairman and CEO until his retirement in December 1985. George Talley then was chairman, and CEO from 1986–1991. During Talley's tenure, USPA&IRA staff grew to 500 advisors. Lamar Smith, company president and COO, was promoted to chairman and CEO in 1992.

First Command Bank opened for business on April 21, 1997. In less than six months, the bank was posting more than 100 new deposit accounts and 50 new loans weekly. In 1998, USPA&IRA went “private,” transitioning from a C Corporation to an S Corporation and later, in 2002, become 100% employee-owned. USPA&IRA launched a tax services program in 2001.

=== Name change to First Command ===
USPA&IRA changed its name to First Command Financial Planning in 2001. The company explained that it changed its name because:

We are sometimes confused with other companies that service the military and former military clientele and whose names also start with the letters “US...”. There are several such companies, but none like us and we don’t want any confusion.

=== Class action settlements ===
In 2004, a New York Times investigative report by Diana B. Henriques named First Command as being one of several investment firms engaged in deceptive marketing of financial instruments aimed at military veterans. On 15 December of that year, the U.S. Securities and Exchange Commission (SEC) determined that First Command had "willfully violated the Securities Act of 1933 Section 17(a)(2) dealing with inter-state fraud" in its marketing activities targeting veterans. In particular, the SEC concluded that First Command had sold mutual fund investments to veterans termed "systematic plans" that bore very high sales charges termed "front-end sales loads", "by, in part, making misleading statements and omissions concerning, among other things: (a) comparisons between the systematic plan and other mutual fund investments; (b) the availability of the Thrift Savings Plan ("TSP"), which offers military investors many of the features of a systematic plan at lower costs; and (c) the efficacy of the front-end sales load in ensuring that investors remain committed to the systematic plan."

In an independent investigation, the National Association of Securities Dealers (NASD) charged First Command "with inappropriately confronting a customer who complained, failing to maintain e-mail, failing to maintain adequate supervisory systems and procedures and filing an inaccurate Form U-5 regulatory report".

In December 2004, First Command entered into a $12 million settlement with the SEC and NASD without admitting guilt. As part of the settlement, First Command agreed to offer restitution to all clients who had purchased and sold a systematic plan between 1999 and 2004, establishment of educational programs, and monitoring or prefiling. People who had not terminated their systematic plan were not covered in the settlement. In September 2007, a California judge granted "Class Action" status to a 2005 lawsuit filed by systematic plan holders whose plans were active when the SEC issued its ruling on December 15, 2004. In October 2008, attorneys for the plaintiffs sought court approval for a settlement. The settlement was approved by the court in April 2009.

In 2004, the SEC report noted "The great majority of the firm's agents are former commissioned or non-commissioned military officers." The report was part of the proceedings in reaching a settlement with First Financial over charges that the firm "willfully violated the Securities Act of 1933 Section 17(a)(2) dealing with inter-state fraud" in marketing financial instruments to veterans.

As of August 2006, Mary Schapiro, the NASD Vice-Chairman and President of Regulatory Policy and Oversight continued to be critical of First Command, calling it an "unscrupulous organization" with an "awful" product. First Command's new president, Marty Durbin, responded to her criticism by stating, "It’s unfortunate that settling these charges still doesn’t mean it’s behind us. But it’s a futile effort to try to fight negative press and so we decided not to put a lot of energy that way."

=== Obtaining Registered Investment Advisor status ===
In anticipation of an SEC ruling requiring that all firms whose primary business is financial planning must become a Registered Investment Advisor (RIA), First Command filed with the SEC to become one in the spring of 2005. This requires their agents to obtain additional training and certifications. As RIAs, the agents could now use the term "Financial Advisors" as compared to "Registered Agents", with the former being held to a higher ethical standard. The higher standards require agents to document every client interaction in great detail and apply due diligence to all investment recommendations to ensure they are in the best interests of the client. The company no longer offers the controversial systematic investment plans.

In 2006, First Command introduced long term care and property and casualty insurance. Later that year in December, First Command announced it had signed on as a corporate partner with the Bell Helicopter Armed Forces Bowl.

In September 2007, Samantha Hilliard, First Command district advisor was featured in Newsweek. Hilliard received the 2007 realLIFEstories Client Service Award for her service to the widow of an Army officer killed in Iraq. The award was presented by the Life and Health Insurance Foundation for Education (LIFE), a non-profit group dedicated to providing the public with information and education on life, disability, long-term care and health insurance.

On July 4, 2008, ABC’s Good Morning America featured a story on a First Command-sponsored charity the Package Brigade that sends care packages to troops serving in Iraq and Afghanistan. That same summer, the U.S. Department of Defense and the National Committee for Employer Support of the Guard and Reserve honored First Command with the Patriotic Employer Award, which is presented to companies and individuals for contributing to national security and protecting liberty and freedom by supporting employee participation in America’s National Guard and Reserve forces.

== Partnerships ==
First Command has partnered with several organizations that support military veterans and their families. These include Hiring Our Heroes, Project Sanctuary, the Association of the United States Army, the Marine Corps Marathon, Army West Point Athletics, and the Department of Defense Military Spouse Employment Partnership.

== First Command Financial Behaviors Index ==
First Command has developed the First Command Financial Behaviors Index. It assesses trends among the American public's financial behaviors, intentions, and attitudes through a monthly survey of approximately 530 U.S. consumers, ages 25–70, with annual household incomes of at least $50,000. The survey includes active-duty service members in pay grades E-5 and above. Survey results have been reported by national news organizations including the Wall Street Journal, The New York Times, McClatchy-Tribune News Service, USA Today, and Financial Planning magazine

== First Command Education Foundation ==
First Command established the First Command Education Foundation (FCEF) in 1983 and presently operates as an independent 501(c)(3) non-profit public charity that is "dedicated to improving financial readiness through education and scholarship opportunities". In 2017, FCEF disbursed $114,484 in scholarship grants. The FCEF Chief Executive Officer received $155,540 in salary and other compensation during this same period.
