= Alphaeon Corporation =

American healthcare company

Coordinates: 33°40′42″N 117°51′9″W

- Company type: Private
- Industry: Technology
- Founded: 2013
- Founder: Robert E. Grant
- Headquarters: Irvine, California, U.S.
- Parent: Strathspey Crown LLC
- Website: www.alphaeoncorporation.com

Alphaeon Corporation is a company focused on healthcare products and services based in Irvine, California. Alphaeon Corporation serves healthcare providers in the self-pay segment; primarily plastic surgery, ophthalmology, dentistry, and dermatology.

== History ==
Alphaeon Corporation was founded in July 2013 by former chief executive officer, Robert E. Grant. Alphaeon Corporation remains a wholly owned subsidiary of Strathspey Crown LLC, a private equity firm located in Newport Beach, California.

In January 2020, Alphaeon completely reorganized its corporate structure and split into two business units, AEON Biopharma, Inc. and Alphaeon1 LLC, doing business as Alphaeon Credit.
