= Mary Schapiro =

29th Chairwoman of the Securities and Exchange Commission (born 1955)

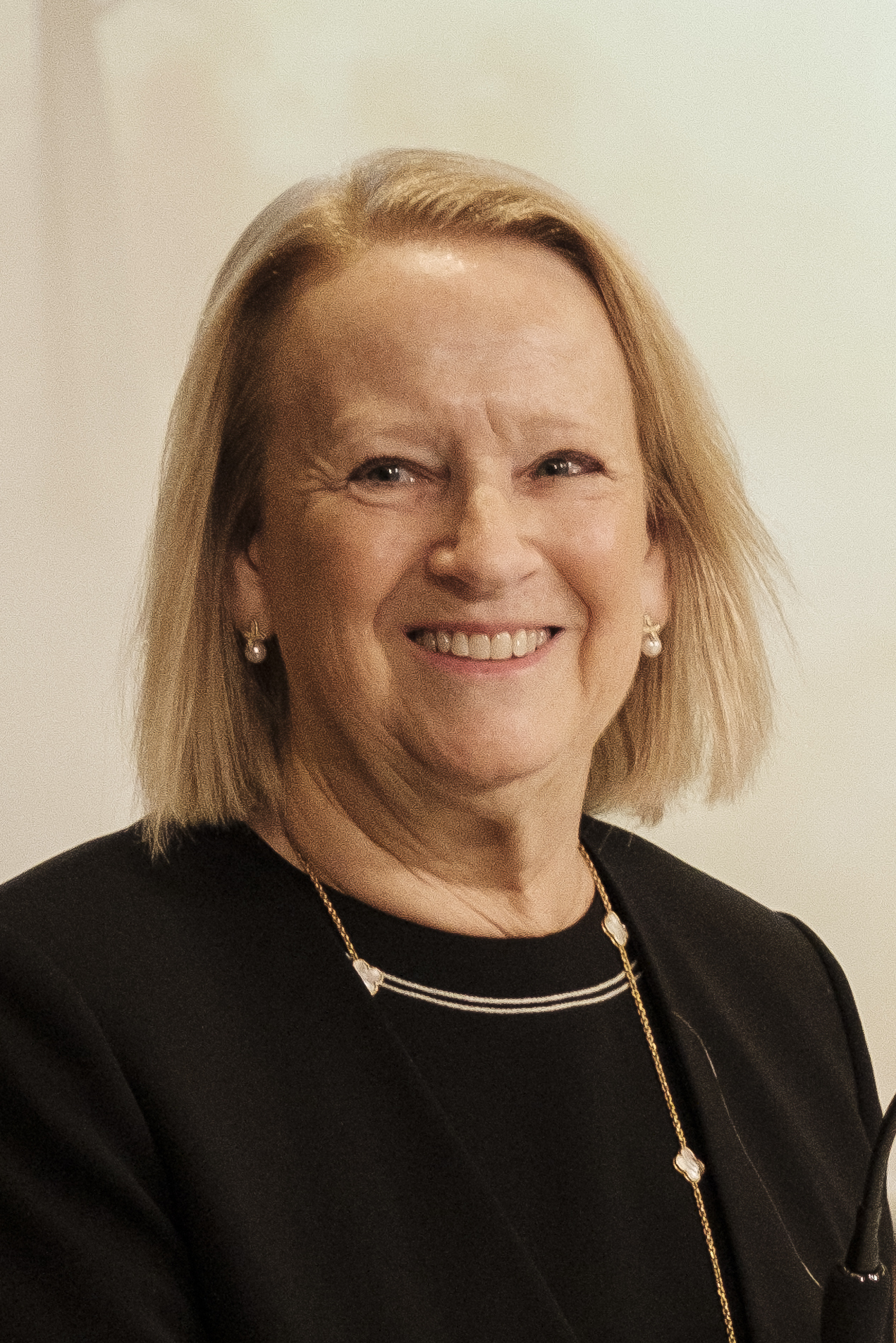
- Mary Schapiro at the One Planet Sovereign Wealth Funds Summit in June 2023

29th Chair of the Securities and Exchange Commission
- In office January 27, 2009 – December 14, 2012
- President: Barack Obama
- Preceded by: Christopher Cox
- Succeeded by: Elisse B. Walter
- In office May 7, 1993 – July 27, 1993; Acting
- President: Bill Clinton
- Preceded by: Richard C. Breeden
- Succeeded by: Arthur Levitt

Chair of the Commodity Futures Trading Commission
- In office October 13, 1994 – January 26, 1996
- President: Bill Clinton
- Preceded by: Barbara Holum (acting)
- Succeeded by: John Tull (acting)

Personal details
- Born: June 19, 1955 (age 71) New York City, New York, U.S.
- Party: Independent
- Education: Franklin and Marshall College (BA); George Washington University (JD)

Mary Lovelace Schapiro (born June 19, 1955) served as the 29th Chair of the U.S. Securities and Exchange Commission (SEC). She was appointed by President Barack Obama, unanimously confirmed by the U.S. Senate, and assumed the Chairship on January 27, 2009. She is the first woman to be the permanent Chair of the SEC. In 2009, Forbes ranked her the 56th most powerful woman in the world.

Schapiro served in various roles as a financial services regulator in the administrations of Ronald Reagan, George H. W. Bush, and Bill Clinton. From 2006 to early 2009, she was the chairman and CEO of the Financial Industry Regulatory Authority (FINRA), the securities industry's self-regulatory organization for broker-dealers and exchanges in the United States. Schapiro is the first person to lead both the SEC and the Commodity Futures Trading Commission (CFTC), and the only one to have chaired those two agencies as well as FINRA. From 2015 to 2023, she led the secretariat of the Task Force on Climate-related Financial Disclosures.

Schapiro currently serves as the vice-chair of the Glasgow Financial Alliance for Net Zero (GFANZ), a group formed during COP26 climate conference in Glasgow and describes itself as "a global coalition of leading financial institutions committed to accelerating the decarbonization of the economy."

In 2025, she was named to the TIME 100 Climate list and given the Alfred J. Rauschman Award by SIFMA.

== Early life and education ==
Schapiro was born in New York City to Robert and Mary Susan "Sue" Hall Schapiro. One of four children, Schapiro grew up in Babylon, New York, where her father owned the Tempus Fugit antique store. and her mother was a reference librarian. Schapiro graduated from Babylon High School, and matriculated at Franklin & Marshall College, where she graduated in 1977. In 1980 she earned a Juris Doctor (J.D.) degree with honors from George Washington University Law School.

== Career prior to the SEC ==
Schapiro was appointed in 1988 by President Ronald Reagan to fill one of two Democratic seats on the SEC. President George H. W. Bush reappointed her to this position in 1989. President Bill Clinton appointed Schapiro acting Chair of the SEC, and then appointed her Chair of the Commodity Futures Trading Commission in 1994. She was the youngest SEC commissioner in history.

In 1996 Schapiro joined the National Association of Securities Dealers (NASD) (now the Financial Industry Regulatory Authority) as the president of NASD Regulation. In 2002 she became the Vice Chair of the NASD.

In 2005 Schapiro oversaw a wide-reaching probe into gift-giving and entertaining on Wall Street, uncovering several instances of lavish and excessive activities, which led to many charges.

In 2006 she became NASD's Chair and CEO. In that position, she oversaw NASD's consolidation with NYSE Member Regulation to form the Financial Industry Regulatory Authority.

In January 2008, President George W. Bush appointed Schapiro to the 19-member council of the President's Advisory Council on Financial Literacy. In 2008, Schapiro was named to Investment Advisor magazine's IA 25, the list of the 25 most influential people in and around the investment advisory business.

In 2008, her last year at FINRA, Schapiro earned a regular compensation package of $3.3 million; on departure from FINRA, she received additional lump sum retirement benefit payments to a total of just under $9 million. She received $8.99 million as a "final distribution," including $7.6 million in vested retirement benefits, according to a Finra report.

== SEC Chair ==
In January 2009 the U.S. Senate unanimously confirmed Schapiro's appointment by President Barack Obama to be the SEC's first female permanent chair.

Schapiro partially blamed the financial crises of 2008 on deregulation, telling senators that the regulatory system had "not kept pace with the markets and the needs of investors". As the SEC's head, she said, she would press for tighter regulation of financial instruments, including derivatives.

During Schapiro's tenure at the SEC, the agency improved its enforcement program, creating new structures, procedures, and programs to better address the modern financial markets, including: bringing 735 enforcement actions in FY 2011 and 734 actions in FY 2012; obtaining more than $11 billion in ordered disgorgements and penalties since FY 2009; prosecuting the largest insider trading scheme discovered to date, winning a record $92.8 million fine in the civil case against the CEO of the Galleon Hedge Fund; and bringing financial-crisis related actions against Fannie Mae and Freddie Mac, among others.

With Schapiro at the helm, enforcement actions brought by the SEC returned more than $6 billion to harmed investors. Schapiro also led the agency through one of its most active rulemaking periods, and enacted many other investor protection measures, including adopting more than three quarters of the rules required by the Dodd-Frank Act.

Following the flash crash of 2010, the SEC under Schapiro implemented several reforms including circuit breakers to minimize stock market volatility and new rules for holding clearly erroneous trades and banning "naked access" to the market. She said these steps would buffer the market against future similar events.

An early setback for Schapiro as SEC Chair occurred in September 2009 when U.S. District Judge Jed Rakoff rejected the SEC's proposed $33 million settlement with Bank of America. BoA had been charged with failure to disclose bonuses paid to Merrill Lynch executive before the two companies merged. Under the settlement's terms BoA was allowed to deny any wrongdoing, which they did when pressed by Rakoff on the matter of guilt. Rakoff said the settlement did not "comport with the most elementary notions of justice and morality". Seven months later, Rakoff approved a $150 million settlement of the BoA case; BoA did not have to change its declaration of innocence.

Also under Schapiro, the SEC issued guidance in 2010 that addressed how public companies are disclose information about the impact of climate change on their business. Upon her departure from the SEC in December 2012, President Obama commended Schapiro's contributions as chair in an official White House statement.

== Subsequent career ==
In April 2013, Schapiro joined Promontory Financial Group where she served as Advisory Board Vice Chair until leaving the firm for Bloomberg LP in 2018. At Bloomberg she serves as Vice Chair of Global Public Policy and Special Advisor to the Founder and chairman. At Bloomberg Schapiro focuses on climate finance, serving on the secretariat of the Task Force on Climate-related Financial Disclosures. Schapiro had championed such disclosures while at the SEC.

Under her leadership, the Task Force released voluntary recommendations on how companies should disclose information about how climate-related factors could impact their business. More than 2,000 organizations and companies with a market capitalization of more than $20 trillion have endorsed the recommendations, and in 2021, they were endorsed by the G7 and G20. The Task Force was disbanded after delivering its 2023 status report. Schapiro said of the process that she was worried the final report would be ignored as a "wonderful paperweight for people's desks," but the G7 endorsement of their work was "enormously important" and signaled that global leaders understood climate risk was an "existential problem."

In 2014, Schapiro and former New York City Mayor Michael Bloomberg joined the Sustainability Accounting Standards Board. The SASB is an independent nonprofit organization that sets standards to guide the disclosure of financially material sustainability information by companies to their investors. Bloomberg and Schapiro also serve together on the Working Group on U.S. RMB Trading and Clearing, where Schapiro is vice-chair. The group was formed in 2015 to establish the trading and clearing of the Chinese currency renminbi (RMB) in the United States.

In 2013 she joined the board of directors of General Electric, and in 2015, she joined the board of directors of the London Stock Exchange Group. In 2017, she was elected to the board of directors of CVS Health and the following year she joined the board of Morgan Stanley. In 2019, she was tapped to advise the Hong Kong Exchanges and Clearing. Schapiro is a member of the Council on Foreign Relations and a trustee of Franklin and Marshall College.

Since it was announced at the 2021 United Nations Climate Change Conference (known as COP26) in Scotland, Schapiro has served as vice chair of the Glasgow Financial Alliance for Net Zero (GFANZ). The job of GFANZ is "essentially to hold the financial community accountable for its pivotal role in addressing climate change." In July 2023, Schapiro was recognized for her work with GFANZ and prior work on the Task Force on Climate-related Financial Disclosures and named the first recipient of the Insight Investment and Oxford University Prize for Greening Finance. In December 2023, at COP28 in Dubai, UAE, Schapiro said a new GFANZ-led capacity-building coalition promoting clean energy and resilience would empower banks in emerging and developing countries to "play a role in their country's climate adaptation and mitigation."

In March 2025, Shapiro was awarded the Alfred J. Rauschman Award by the SIFMA Compliance & Legal Society. In October of the same year she was named one of the 100 Most Influential People in Climate by Time Magazine.

Mary Schapiro was recently honored with the Lifetime Achievement Award at the 2026 Finance for the Future Awards, held during the A4S Summit. The award recognizes her extensive public service career and her ongoing global impact on sustainable finance.

== Personal life ==
Schapiro is married to Charles "Chas" Cadwell, a former official with the U.S. Small Business Administration. They have two daughters. She serves as treasurer of the Humane Rescue Alliance, formerly the Washington Humane Society.

Political offices
Preceded by Richard Breeden	Chair of the Securities and Exchange Commission; Acting; 1993	Succeeded by Arthur Levitt
Preceded by Barbara Holum; Acting	Chair of the Commodity Futures Trading Commission; 1994–1996	Succeeded by John Tull; Acting
Preceded by Christopher Cox	Chair of the Securities and Exchange Commission; 2009–2012	Succeeded by Elisse Walter
