= Kazickas =

- Lithuanian surname
- m.: Kazickas
- f.: (unmarried): Kazickaitė
- f.: (married): Kazickienė

Kazickas is a Lithuanian surname. Notable people with the surname include:

- Juozas Kazickas (1918–2014), Lithuanian–American businessman
- Jurate Kazickas (born 1943), Lithuanian–American journalist
