= William Childress =

American writer (1933–2022)

William Childress, at his Douglas, Arizona, home in 2015.

William Childress (February 5, 1933 - February 9, 2022) was an American writer, author, poet, and photojournalist. Childress received numerous awards, prizes, and accolades for his writing and poetry, and is regarded as one of the foremost poets of the Korean War by at least two critics.

== Biography ==
Childress was born the oldest son of a poor family of migrant sharecroppers. He joined the Army in 1951 at age 18 and deployed to Korea in September 1952 during the Korean War as a demolitions specialist. He was honorably discharged in November 1953 and attended barber school. In 1955, he reenlisted as a paratrooper serving in Germany and France. While a paratrooper, he made 33 airborne jumps, and twice narrowly escaping death from parachute malfunctions. He received an honorable discharge in 1958. He then enlisted in the United States Air Force, where he served as an altitude chamber specialist for seven months and received a third honorable discharge in 1959.

While in the military, he earned a high school equivalent education. Shortly after leaving the Air Force, he attended Fresno State College in California, studying English and Journalism, and set a record as the only undergraduate to publish poetry, fiction and photojournalism in national magazines (Display World, Mademoiselle, and Poetry).

This helped him get two fellowships to the University of Iowa Writers Workshop and a Master of Fine Arts degree. His thesis later became his first book of poems, Lobo.

Childress lived for some time in Folsom, California. His wife, Diane, died there in December 2013. He lived in Beatty, Nevada, until his death on February 9, 2022, at the age of 89.

== Photojournalism ==
During his 50-year photojournalism career, Childress published some 4,000 articles in various magazines and other publications, including National Geographic, Country Living, The Saturday Evening Post, McCall's, Playboy, Ladies' Home Journal, Smithsonian, Sports Afield, TV Guide, Air & Space Smithsonian, The Nation, and The New Republic, as well as approximately 6,000 magazine and newspaper photos ("...more magazine sales, I’m guessing, than any writer alive," according to author/photographer Richard Menzies).

For 14 years (from 1983 to 1997), Childress wrote a regular column for the St. Louis Post-Dispatch called "Out of the Ozarks." His column became so popular that in 1988 Childress wrote a book, also titled Out of the Ozarks, which was published by Southern Illinois University Press, and became a regional bestseller. Childress was also nominated (twice) for the Pulitzer Prize, in the Commentary category.

== Poetry and short stories ==
Childress published some 350 poems, in such journals as Poetry Magazine, Poet Lore, The Southern Review, North American Review, Harper's, Kenyon Review, Hearse, Georgia Review, and Northwest Review, as well as the anthologies Old Glory, The Hundred Years War, The Orvis Anthology, University of Columbia American War Poetry Anthology (2007), Tall Tales & Short Stories, and The Madness of It All. He published dozens of short stories, including "Uncle Roman," which won the prestigious STORY award in 1970. He published three books of poetry: Burning the Years (1970, Barlenmir House), the Devins Award-winning Lobo (1972, Barlenmir House), and Selected Poems (1986, Essai Sea Press). His fourth poetry book, "Cowboys & Indians", was completed but not published; roughly half of its poems have appeared in various magazines over the years.

== Non-fiction, memoirs, and novels ==
In 2006, Childress' autobiographical memoir An Ozark Odyssey was published by Southern Illinois University Press. An ex-paratrooper and Korean War demolitions expert, Childress also wrote a Korean War memoir, Working Man's War. In addition, Childress wrote a novel, The Taro Leaf Murders, and co-authored (with Frank Oberle) the photographic anthology Missouri on My Mind (1990, Falcon Press).

== Literary awards and other accolades ==
In addition to his two Pulitzer Prize nominations, Childress' literary awards and achievements include the Joseph Henry Jackson Poetry Award, the State of Illinois Literary Award, the Poetry Society of America Award, and the above-mentioned Devins Award. In 2004, Childress was awarded a $5,000 fellowship to the exclusive Millay Colony for the Arts, a prestigious writer's retreat in upstate New York. Childress was also awarded the "Maxwell Medal" by the Dog Writers Association of America in 2003, for his story "Bonnie's Big Break."

Childress' work has been read on BBC radio, as well as featured in a 2003 Canadian Korean War documentary, "The Unfinished War." Childress has appeared on American television and radio numerous times.

In the mid-1980s, Childress was being considered (together with a number of other journalists) as a candidate for the Journalist in Space Project, which aimed to put a journalist aboard the U.S. Space Shuttle. However, the tragic 1986 death of teacher Christa McAuliffe in the Space Shuttle Challenger disaster put an end to the Civilians In Space program.

== Literary works ==
- Burning the Years (1970)
- Lobo (1972)
- Selected Poems (1986)
- Out of the Ozarks (1988)
- Missouri On My Mind (1990)
- An Ozark Odyssey (2006)
