= Wells Fargo Center (Los Angeles) =

Skyscraper in downtown Los Angeles

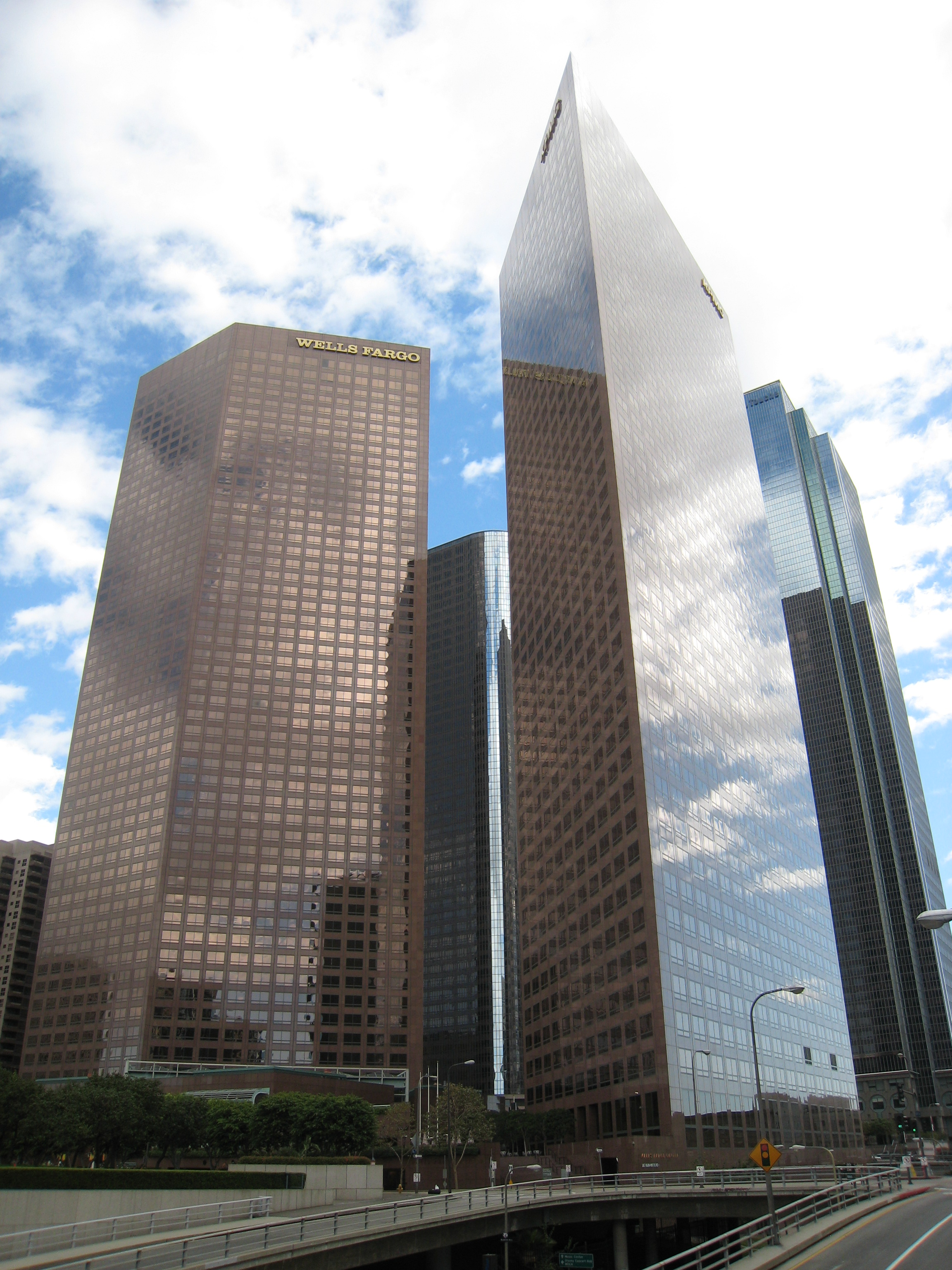
- Wells Fargo Tower (left), and KPMG Tower
- Interactive map of the Wells Fargo Center area
- Alternative names: Crocker Center; Crocker Center North & South; Wells Fargo Center I & II; IBM Tower

General information
- Type: Commercial offices
- Location: 333 S. Grand Avenue; Los Angeles, California
- Coordinates: 34.0524°N 118.2522°W
- Construction started: 1980-1981
- Completed: 1983
- Owner: Brookfield Properties Inc.

Height
- Roof: Tower I: 220.37 m (723.0 ft); Tower II: 170.69 m (560.0 ft)

Technical details
- Floor count: Tower I: 54; Tower II: 45
- Floor area: Tower I: 1,391,000 sq ft (129,200 m^{2}); Tower II: 1,140,000 sq ft (106,000 m^{2})
- Lifts/elevators: Tower I: 29; Tower II: 26

Design and construction
- Architect: Skidmore, Owings & Merrill
- Developer: Maguire Properties; Thomas Properties Group
- Structural engineer: Skidmore, Owings & Merrill
- Main contractor: Turner Construction

Other information
- Public transit: Grand Avenue Arts/Bunker Hill

Wells Fargo Center is a twin tower skyscraper complex in Downtown Los Angeles on Bunker Hill, in Los Angeles, California. It comprises South and North towers, which are joined by a three-story glass atrium.

The project received the 1986–1987 and 2003–2004 Building Owners and Managers Association (BOMA) Office Building of the Year Award, and numerous others. A branch of the Wells Fargo History Museum was located at the center.

== Wells Fargo Tower ==
Wells Fargo Tower (Tower I), at 220 m (720 ft) it is the taller building of the complex. It has 54 floors and it is the 8th tallest building in Los Angeles, and the 92nd-tallest building in the United States. When it opened in 1983, it was known as the Crocker Tower, named after San Francisco-based Crocker National Bank. Crocker merged with Wells Fargo in 1986.

Anchor tenants

- Wells Fargo Bank (Floors 1,5,7,9,11,12)
- Payden & Rygel (Floors 39-40)
- Gibson, Dunn & Crutcher (Floors 44–54)
- Oaktree Capital Management (Floors 23–25, 27–30, 34)
- DoubleLine Capital (Floors 17-19)

== South Tower ==
South Tower (Tower II) is 171 m (561 ft), and was completed in 1983 with 45 floors. It is the 17th tallest building in the city.

Anchor tenants

- Latham & Watkins (Floors 1–9)
- Reed Smith (Floors 28-29)

== Architectural criticism ==
Cultural critic Fredric Jameson used Skidmore, Owings and Merrill's Crocker Bank Center (as it was then named) as an example of what he sees as Postmodern architecture's "depthlessness":

Nor is this depthlessness merely metaphorical: it can be experienced physically and literally by anyone who, mounting what used to be Raymond Chandler's Beacon Hill from the great Chicano markets on Broadway and 4th St. in downtown Los Angeles, suddenly confronts the great free-standing wall of the Crocker Bank Center (Skidmore, Owings and Merrill) -- a surface which seems to be unsupported by any volume, or whose putative volume (rectangular, trapezoidal?) is ocularly quite undecidable. This great sheet of windows, with its gravity-defying two-dimensionality, momentarily transforms the solid ground on which we climb into the contents of a stereopticon, pasteboard shapes profiling themselves here and there around us. From all sides, the visual effect is the same: as fateful as the great monolith in Kubrick's 2001 which confronts its viewers like an enigmatic destiny, a call to evolutionary mutation. If this new multinational downtown ... effectively abolished the older ruined city fabric which it violently replaced, cannot something similar be said about the way in which this strange new surface in its own peremptory way renders our older systems of perception of the city somehow archaic and aimless, without offering another in their place?

== See also ==
- List of tallest buildings in Los Angeles
- List of tallest buildings in the United States
