= Out of the Ozarks =

1988 book by William Childress

Out of the Ozarks is the title of a 1988 book by Pulitzer Prize-nominated journalist William Childress, about his life and experiences in the rural American midwest region known as the Ozarks. The book, published by Southern Illinois University Press, is a collection of stories culled from Childress' St. Louis Post-Dispatch column "Out of the Ozarks," which ran as often as three times a week between the years 1983 and 1997.
