= Richard S. Carnell =

United States lawyer

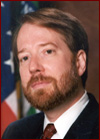
Richard S. Carnell

Richard Scott Carnell is a United States lawyer who was Assistant Secretary of the Treasury for Financial Institutions from 1993 to 1999.

== Biography ==
Richard S. Carnell was educated at Yale University, receiving a B.A. in 1975. He later attended Harvard Law School, receiving a J.D. in 1982.

From 1982 to 1984, Carnell worked as an associate attorney at the law firm of Broad, Schulz, Larson & Wineberg in San Francisco. He then worked as an attorney for the Board of Governors of the Federal Reserve System from 1984 to 1987. He became Counsel of the United States Senate Committee on Banking, Housing, and Urban Affairs in 1987 and was then the Committee's Senior Counsel 1989-1993.

In 1993, President of the United States Bill Clinton nominated Carnell to be Assistant Secretary of the Treasury for Financial Institutions. He held that office until 1999.

Since leaving government service, Carnell has been a law professor at the Fordham University School of Law.

Government offices
Preceded by Lewis A. Sachs	Assistant Secretary of the Treasury for Financial Markets; 2001 — 2004	Succeeded by Timothy S. Bitsberger
