= Mary J. Miller =

Former American Under Secretary for Domestic Finance

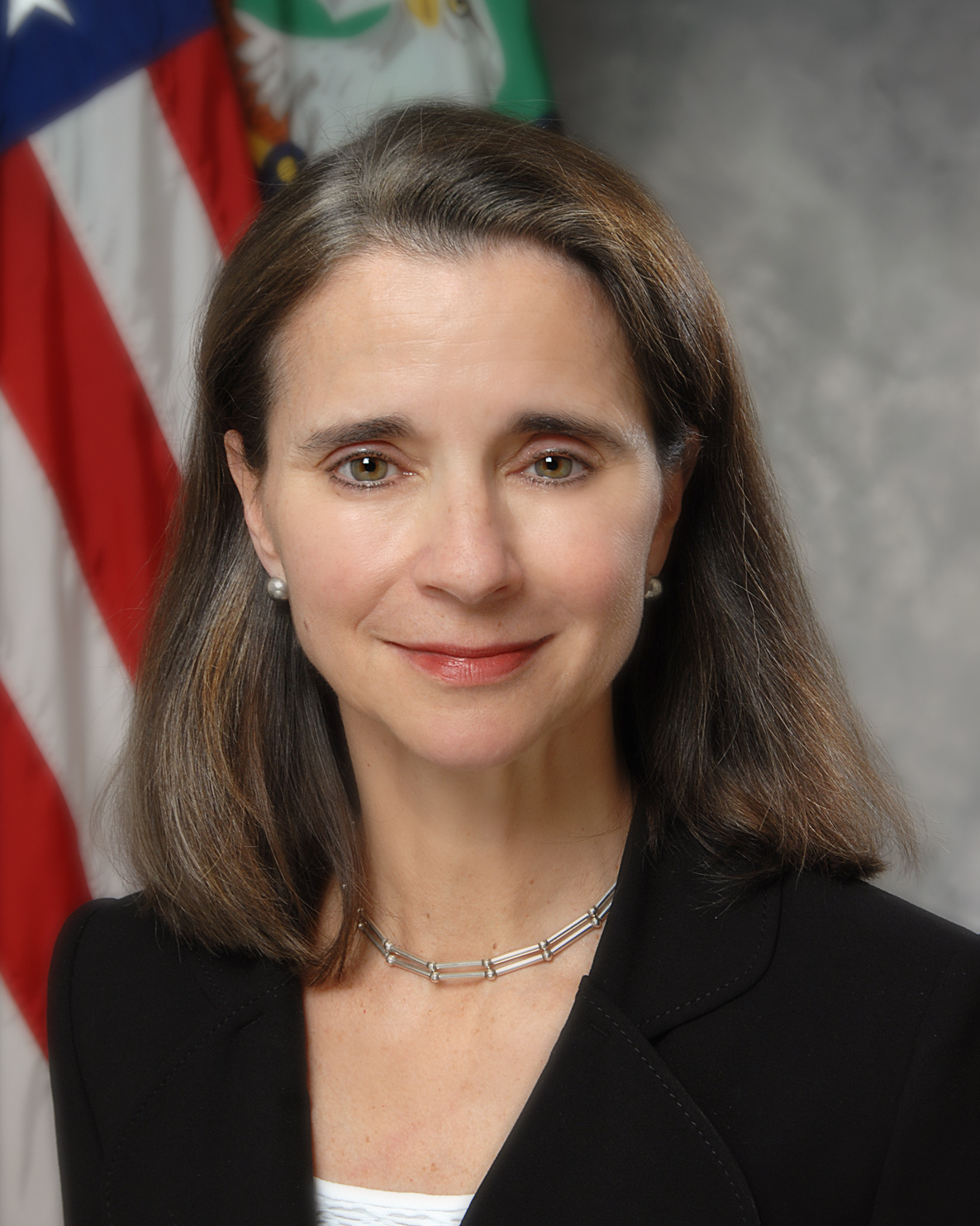
- Official portrait, 2010

United States Deputy Secretary of the Treasury Acting
- In office August 31, 2013 – March 19, 2014
- President: Barack Obama
- Preceded by: Neal S. Wolin
- Succeeded by: Sarah Bloom Raskin

Under Secretary of the Treasury for Domestic Finance
- In office March 2012 – September 2014
- President: Barack Obama
- Preceded by: Jeffrey A. Goldstein
- Succeeded by: Nellie Liang (2021)

Assistant Secretary of the Treasury for Financial Markets
- In office February 2010 – March 2012
- President: Barack Obama
- Preceded by: Anthony Ryan
- Succeeded by: Matthew Rutherford

Personal details
- Born: July 19, 1955 (age 71) Bonn, West Germany
- Party: Democratic
- Spouse: Jim Miller
- Education: Cornell University (BA); University of North Carolina, Chapel Hill (MCRP)

Mary John Miller (born July 19, 1955) is an American government official and political candidate who served as Under Secretary of the Treasury for Domestic Finance and a former Acting Deputy Secretary of the Treasury. In 2020, she announced her candidacy for Mayor of Baltimore but lost to Council President Brandon Scott in the June 2020 Democratic primary. She was also a director of Silicon Valley Bank, the second biggest bank to go bankrupt in US history.

== Early life and education ==
As a child, Miller grew up in Princeton, New Jersey and Ithaca, New York. Miller received a B.A. from Cornell University, where she was a member of the Quill and Dagger society. She received a Master of City and Regional Planning from the University of North Carolina at Chapel Hill.

== Career ==
=== At T. Rowe Price ===
Miller spent 26 years working for T. Rowe Price Group, Inc., where she was the director of the Fixed Income Division and a member of the firm's Management Committee. Miller also has earned her Chartered Financial Analyst designation.

=== In the Treasury Department ===
Miller joined Treasury as President Obama's appointee as Assistant Secretary of the Treasury for Financial Markets, where she advised the Secretary on broad matters of domestic finance, financial markets, federal, state and local finance, and federal government lending policies. In this role, she was responsible for Treasury's management of the public debt.

Miller served as President Obama's Under Secretary for Domestic Finance in the Department of the Treasury from March 2012 to September 2014. As Under Secretary for Domestic Finance, Miller was responsible for developing and coordinating Treasury's policies and guidance in the areas of financial institutions, federal debt financing, financial regulation, and capital markets. Her role included oversight of the Financial Stability Oversight Council.

In November 2011, Miller was included on The New Republic's list of Washington's most powerful, least famous people.

Miller received the Alexander Hamilton Award for Distinguished Service from the Columbia College Alumni Association upon her retirement from Treasury.

=== 2020 Baltimore mayoral election ===
In January 2020, Miller announced her candidacy for the 2020 Baltimore mayoral election. In the June 2 Democratic primary, Miller faced City Council President Brandon Scott, former mayor Sheila Dixon, who resigned in 2010 as a part of a plea agreement, and Jack Young, the incumbent mayor, with Scott being declared the winner.

=== Johns Hopkins University ===
On September 3, 2020, Johns Hopkins University announced that Miller had been appointed interim Senior Vice President for Finance and Administration, overseeing the university's budget and investments.

Political offices
Preceded by Karthik Ramanathan	Assistant Secretary of the Treasury for Financial Markets; 2010–2012	Succeeded by Matthew Rutherford
Preceded by Jeffrey A. Goldstein	Under Secretary of the Treasury for Domestic Finance; 2012–2014	Succeeded by Matthew Rutherford
Preceded by Neal S. Wolin	United States Deputy Secretary of the Treasury; Acting; 2013–2014	Succeeded by Sarah Bloom Raskin
