= Karthik Ramanathan =

American financier

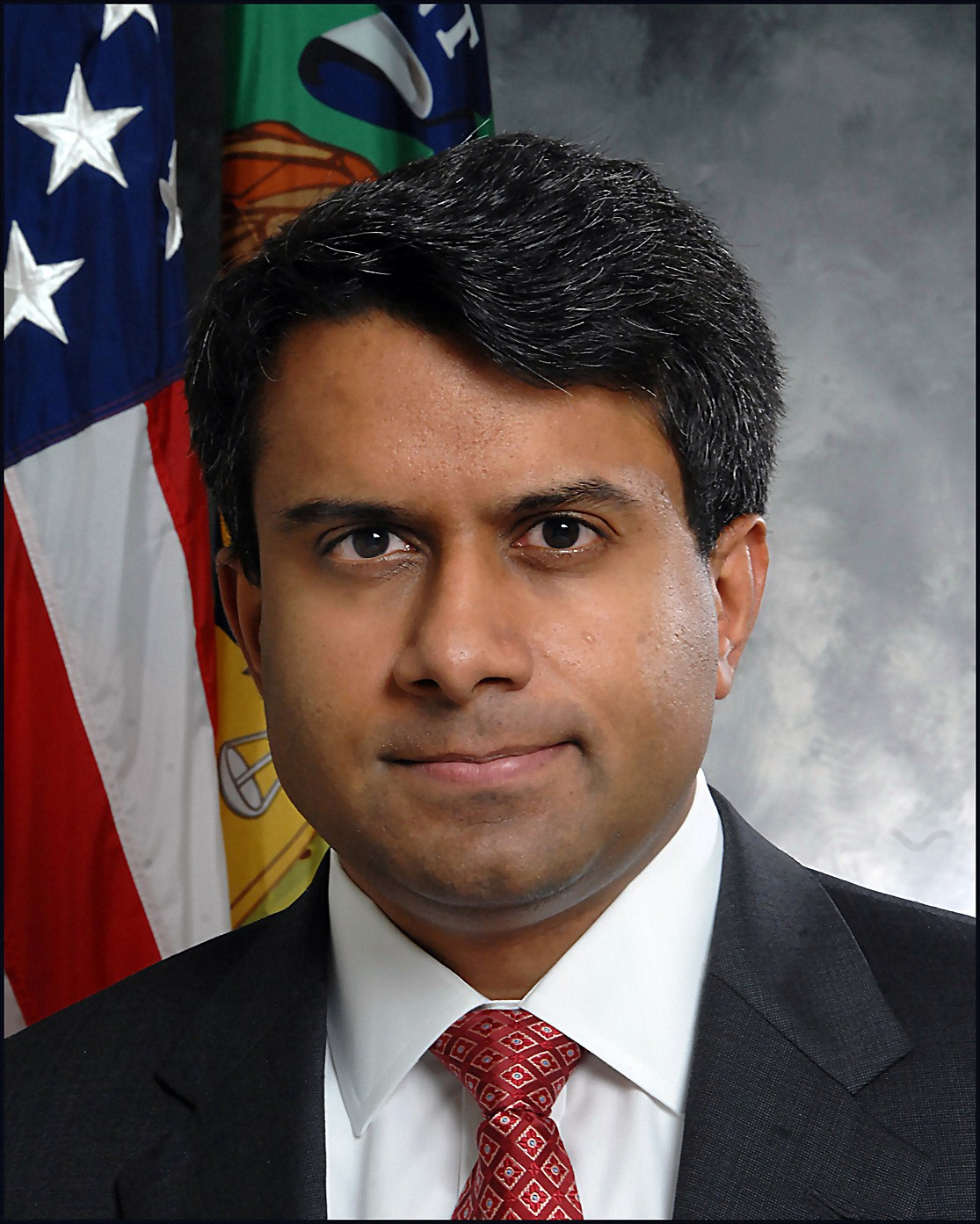

Acting Assistant Secretary of the Treasury for Financial Markets
- In office September 25, 2008 – March 2010
- President: George W. Bush; Barack Obama
- Preceded by: Anthony Ryan
- Succeeded by: Mary J. Miller

Personal details
- Education: Columbia University (BA)

Karthik Ramanathan is an American financier and former government official who served as Acting Assistant Secretary of the Treasury for Financial Markets from 2008 to 2010 and Director of the Office of Debt Management at the United States Department of the Treasury.

== Biography ==
Ramanathan graduated from Columbia University in 1994. After graduation, he worked for Goldman Sachs, where he traded derivatives in Goldman's New York and London offices until 2005. He joined the United States Department of the Treasury in 2005 as a financial economist and became Director of the Office of Debt Management in October 2006. As director, he was responsible for the issuance of more than $8 trillion in U.S. debt and oversaw a $4 trillion national debt increase. He also led a major revamp of the Treasury's outdated risk management systems used to issue the national debt.

On September 25, 2008, Ramanathan was designated Acting Assistant Secretary of the Treasury for Financial Markets by President George W. Bush. He served in that position for 17 months under the Bush and Obama administrations before leaving the job in March 2010.

In April 2010, Ramanathan was hired by Fidelity Investments to become senior vice president and director of Bonds at the mutual fund company.

In 2021, Ramanathan was associated with State Street Corporation.

In 2024, Ramanathan joined Payden & Rygel as a Senior Vice President at the Boston office within client servicing.

== Awards and honors ==
Ramanathan is a 2010 finalist of the Samuel J. Heyman Service to America Medals, for having "orchestrated the sale of Treasury bills that raised $1.7 trillion in the midst of a severe global economic crisis, helping stabilize the U.S. financial system and fund the country's massive budget deficit and national debt," according to the citation.

Government offices
Preceded by Anthony Ryan	Acting Assistant Secretary of the Treasury for Financial Markets; 2008 — 2010	Succeeded by Mary J. Miller
