= Roseboro =

Roseboro or Rosboro may refer to:

== People with the surname ==
- Brian C. Roseboro, an American banker
- John Roseboro (1933–2002), a baseball player
- Viola Roseboro' (1857–1945), literary editor

== Places in the United States ==
- Rosboro, Arkansas, an unincorporated community
- Roseboro, North Carolina, a town
