= An Ozark Odyssey =

Autobiographical memoir by William Childress

- Author: William Childress
- Original title: An Ozark odyssey : The Journey of a Father and Son
- Language: English
- Genre: Biography
- Published: 2005
- Publisher: Southern Illinois University Press
- Publication place: United States
- Pages: 181
- ISBN: 9780809326389

An Ozark Odyssey is an autobiographical memoir written by Pulitzer Prize nominee William Childress. The book tells the story of Childress' turbulent childhood and youth in the American Ozarks, his relationship with his stoic stepfather Jay Childress, and his journey into adulthood.

The book was published in 2005 by Southern Illinois University Press.
