= Peter R. Fisher =

American academic and government official

Peter R. Fisher has been an attorney, a central banker, a U.S. Treasury official, an asset management executive, and an educator. He is currently a Managing Director in the Strategy Function leading the firm’s global retirement initiative at BlackRock.

== Early life and education ==
Fisher was born in Washington D.C. in 1956, the son of Roger D. Fisher and Caroline (Speer) Fisher, and the brother of Elliott S. Fisher. His family moved to Cambridge, Massachusetts, in 1958 when his father joined the faculty of Harvard Law School.

Fisher was educated at the Shady Hill School (1960-1971) and Concord Academy (1971-1974) in Massachusetts. He graduated from Harvard College with a B.A. in history in 1980 and from the Harvard Law School with a J.D. in 1985.

== Career ==
After law school, he joined the Federal Reserve Bank of New York legal department in 1985, where he served until 1989. From 1989 to 1990 Fisher was seconded to the Bank for International Settlements, in Basel, Switzerland, where he served as the secretary of the Committee on Inter-bank Netting Schemes of the Central Banks of the G-10 countries.

In 1990, he joined the foreign exchange department of the New York Fed. From 1995 to 2001, he served as executive vice president of the New York Fed and as Manager of the System Open Market Account, responsible to the Federal Open Market Committee of the Federal Reserve System for the conduct of domestic monetary and foreign currency operations.

In 1998, Fisher played an important role in the resolution of the crisis involving the hedge fund Long-Term Capital Management.

In 2001, President Bush nominated, and the Senate confirmed, Fisher as Under Secretary of the U.S. Treasury for domestic finance. While at the Treasury, Fisher initiated a number of improvements in the auctions for Treasury securities aimed at lowering the cost of government borrowing over time. He played roles in coordinating the reopening of U.S. markets after the events of September 11, 2001, and in responding to the collapse of Enron. He also served as a member of the board of the Securities Investor Protection Corporation (SIPC), on the Air Transportation Stabilization Board (ATSB), and as the Treasury representative to the Pension Benefit Guaranty Corporation (PBGC). Fisher left the Treasury in 2003.

In 2004, Fisher joined the asset management firm BlackRock. From 2005 to 2007, he served as chairman of BlackRock Asia. In 2007, he became co-head, and in 2009 the head, of BlackRock’s Fixed Income Portfolio Management Group. In 2013, he stepped down as head of the fixed income group and served as a senior director of the BlackRock investment institute.

In 2013 Fisher was appointed a senior fellow at the Center for Global Business and Government at the Tuck School of Business at Dartmouth. From 2014 to 2021 he taught a popular second-year MBA course at Tuck called “The Arrhythmia of Finance,” earning the 2021 Teaching Excellence Award. After leaving Dartmouth at the end of 2021, Fisher rejoined BlackRock as a managing director in the Strategy Function to lead the firm’s Global Retirement Initiative.

In 2025 Fisher was appointed Distinguished Senior Fellow at the MIT Golub Center for Finance and Policy at the MIT Sloan School of Management and taught his course “The Arrhythmia of Finance” in the Spring of 2026.

From 2007 to 2013, he served as non-executive director of the Financial Services Authority of the United Kingdom. Among other positions, Fisher has served as a member of the Board of Directors of AIG, (2014-18), and of FINRA’s Board of Governors (2019-21). Since 1994, Fisher is a member of the Council on Foreign Relations. Since 2013, he serves on the Board of Directors of the Peterson Institute for International Economics.

He is a recipient of the distinguished service award from the Bond Market Association (2004), the Alexander Hamilton medal, U.S. Department of the Treasury (2003), and the Postmaster General’s partnership for progress award, United States Postal Service (2002).

In 2026, Fisher joined the University of Washington Foster School of Business as a Professor of Practice of Finance, teaching in the school's Master of Science in Finance program.

Government offices
Preceded by Gary Gensler	Under Secretary of the Treasury for Domestic Finance; 2001 – 2004	Succeeded by Brian C. Roseboro
