= Robert D. Timm =

American politician

Member of the Washington House of Representatives from the 8th district
- In office 1951–1959

Personal details
- Born: Robert Dale Timm; October 2, 1921 Harrington, Washington, U.S
- Died: January 6, 2016 (aged 94)
- Party: Republican
- Occupation: Politician, businessman

Robert Dale Timm (October 2, 1921 – January 6, 2016) was an American politician and businessman.

Born in Harrington, Washington, Timm served in the United States Marine Corps during World War II. He received his bachelor's degree in economics from University of Washington and worked in the aeronautics industry. Timm served on the Harrington School Board. He then served in the Washington House of Representatives from 1951 to 1957 and was a Republican. From 1965 to 1970, Timm served as chairman of the Washington State Utilities and Transportation Board. From 1971 to 1976, Timm served on the Civil Aeronautics Board (CAB), in Washington, D.C. At the time, the now-defunct CAB tightly regulated almost all US commercial air transport. Timm was appointed Chair of the CAB effective 1 March 1973, replacing Secor Browne.

Timm was heavily criticized for his leadership of the CAB. One of Timm's policies was that airlines should make a 12% return on investment and his CAB would not permit fare reductions that could imperil that standard. Timm was caught vacationing with airline CEOs, paid for by aircraft manufacturers. He was also accused by CAB staff of suppressing investigations into illegal contributions by airlines to the re-election campaign of President Nixon. In 1975, Senator Ted Kennedy, with the assistance of future Supreme Court justice Stephen Breyer, held hearings on the conduct of the CAB. Kennedy's report referred Timm to the US Department of Justice for possible prosecution.

President Ford declined to reappoint Timm as chair of the CAB for 1975, and in late 1975 requested his resignation as a board member. Earlier in 1975, Ford had appointed pro-competition John E. Robson as CAB chair. The Kennedy hearings and Robson's appointment are generally held to mark the beginning of the process of airline deregulation in the United States.
