= Office of Financial Markets (U.S.) =

Agency overview
- Type: United States Department of the Treasury agencies
- Jurisdiction: U.S. federal government
- Headquarters: Treasury Building 1500 Pennsylvania Avenue, NW Washington, D.C., U.S; 38°53′51.2″N 77°2′3.4″W
- Agency executive: Under Secretary of the Treasury for Domestic Finance, Assistant Secretary of the Treasury for Financial Markets
- Website: home.treasury.gov/about/offices/domestic-finance/financial-markets

The Office of Financial Markets is an office of the United States federal government in the United States Department of the Treasury. OFM serves as the department's advisor on broad matters of domestic finance, financial markets, Federal, State and local finance (including the Federal debt), Federal Government credit policies, lending and privatization.

The Office of Financial Markets is led by the Assistant Secretary of the Treasury for Financial Markets. The Assistant Secretary reports to the United States Secretary of the Treasury through Under Secretary of the Treasury for Domestic Finance.

Within the Office of Financial Markets are:

- The Office of Federal Finance
- The Office of Government Financial Policy

== Office of Federal Finance ==
The Office of Federal Finance (OFF), under the direction of the Deputy Assistant Secretary for Federal Finance, oversees issues involving Treasury financing, public debt management, Federal regulation of financial markets, and related economic matters including regulatory issues in the Government securities markets and the futures markets. OFF analyzes and monitors economic and financial developments; assesses and originates alternative financing initiatives for the Federal government; manages clearing and settlement issues involving the Government securities markets; proposes changes in tax provisions affecting the Treasury securities market; and oversees foreign investment in Treasury securities. OFF is also responsible for leading the inter-agency effort on advanced counterfeit deterrence.

Within the Office of Federal Finance are

- The Office of Debt Management (ODM), led by the Director of the Office of Debt Management

The ODM is responsible for providing advice and analysis on matters related to the Department of the Treasury's debt management policy, the marketing of Treasury and federally related securities, and financial market research, producing Treasury's official yield curve and setting interest rates for Federal borrowing and lending programs, and advising on the regulation of the Government securities market.

- The Office of Financial Market Policy (OFMP), led by the Director of the Office of Financial Market Policy

The OFMP helps formulate the Department of the Treasury's policy on financial markets, including economic matters regarding, and the regulation of, government securities, credit, equity, and derivatives markets and their structures and participants.

- The Office of Advanced Counterfeit Deterrence (ACD) led by the Director of the Office of Advanced Counterfeit Deterrence

The ACD is charged with the stewardship of the nation’s currency system. The ACD acts with the Secretary of the Treasury to address counterfeit deterrence issues and make decisions on final currency design and counterfeit deterrent features.

== Office of Government Financial Policy ==
Alongside Office of Government Financial Policy (OGFP), OGFP oversees issues related to Government financing. Led by the Deputy Assistant Secretary for Government Financing Policy, OGFP provides analyses of agency and legislative proposals related to Government borrowing, lending, and investment activities and performs actuarial and mathematical analyses and computations as required, for Treasury market financing and other Government agencies. OGFP also develops policy for and manages the operations of the Federal Financing Bank.

Within the Office of Government Financial Policy are:

- The Office of Policy and Legislative Review (OPLR), led by the Director of the Office of Policy and Legislative Review

The OPLR provides technical assistance, analyses, and policy recommendations on Federal programs and legislative proposals involving Government lending and investment activities; and provides actuarial and mathematical analyses and computations as required for Treasury market financing, the Federal Financing Bank, the U.S. Savings Bonds program, and other Government agencies.

- The Office of Federal Lending (OFL), led by the Director of the Office of Federal Lending

The OFL develops policy for and administers the operations of the Federal Financing Bank, and supports the data collection, processing, computer programming, and automated equipment requirements of the Office of Government Financial Policy.

== Boards and Commissions ==
- Air Transportation Stabilization Board
- President's Commission on the U.S. Postal Service
