= John E. Robson =

American attorney

Chairman and President of the Export–Import Bank of the United States
- In office May 30, 2001 – March 20, 2002
- President: George W. Bush
- Preceded by: James Harmon
- Succeeded by: Philip Merrill

4th United States Deputy Secretary of the Treasury
- In office January 20, 1989 – December 30, 1992
- President: George H. W. Bush
- Preceded by: M. Peter McPherson
- Succeeded by: Roger Altman

Chairman of the Civil Aeronautics Board
- In office April 21, 1975 – April 30, 1977
- President: Gerald Ford; Jimmy Carter
- Preceded by: Robert D. Timm
- Succeeded by: Alfred E. Kahn

Personal details
- Born: June 21, 1930; New York City, New York
- Died: March 20, 2002 (aged 71); Washington, D.C.
- Political party: Republican
- Education: Yale University; Harvard Law School

John E. Robson (June 21, 1930 – March 20, 2002) was an American attorney who served as Chairman of the Civil Aeronautics Board from 1975 to 1977, United States Deputy Secretary of the Treasury from 1989 to 1992 and Chairman and President of the Export–Import Bank of the United States from 2001 to 2002. Robson also served as Under Secretary of Transportation in the Lyndon B. Johnson administration.

Robson was born in Washington, D.C., and grew up in Chicago. He died of cancer on March 20, 2002, in Washington, D.C., at age 71.
