= Lynn Sherr =

American broadcast journalist and author (born 1942)

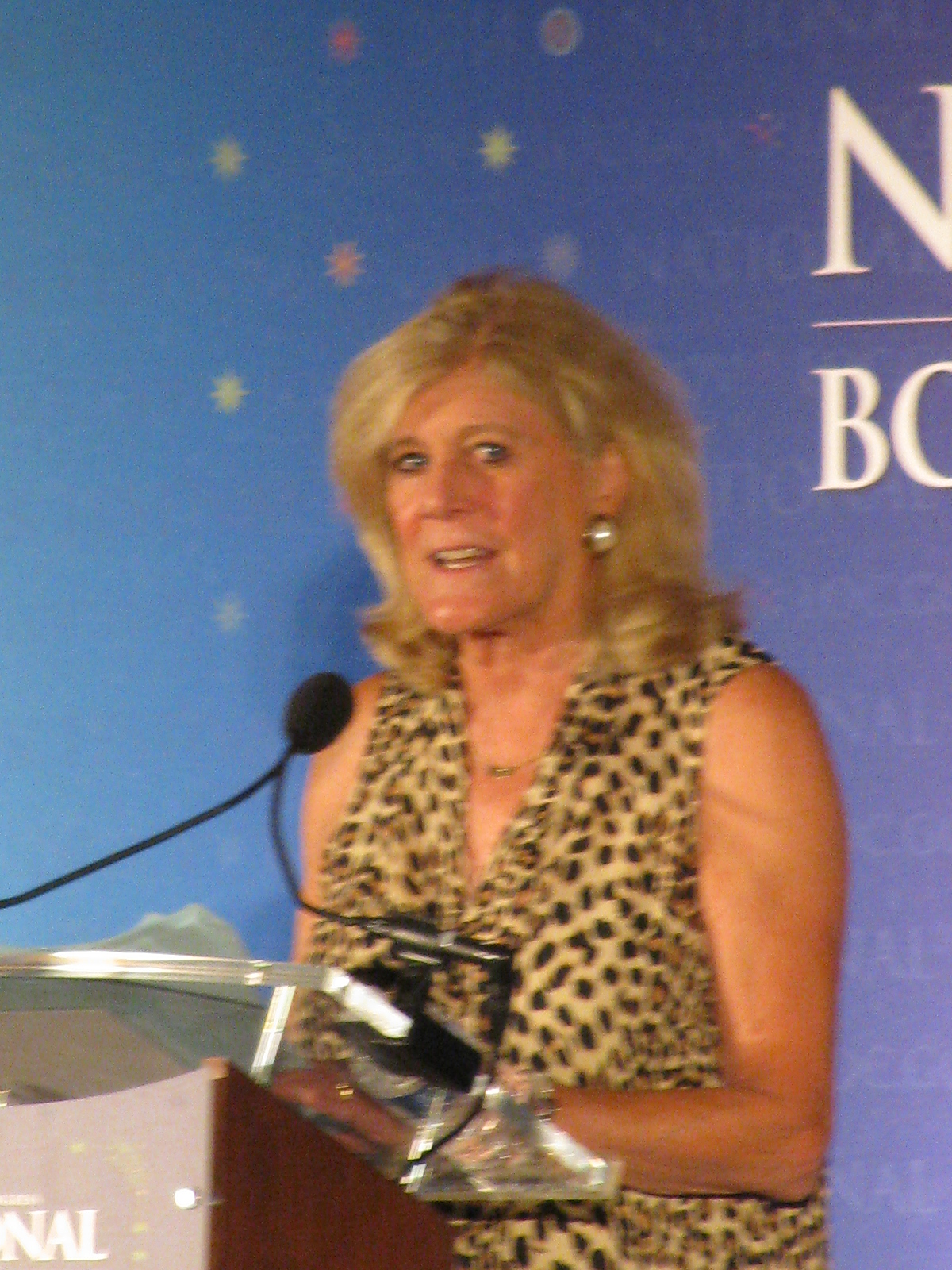
- Sherr at the 2014 National Book Festival
- Born: March 4, 1942 (age 84); Philadelphia, Pennsylvania, U.S.
- Education: Lower Merion High School
- Alma mater: Wellesley College
- Occupation: Broadcast journalist
- Writing career
- Genres: History, biography
- Notable awards: 1994 George Foster Peabody Award

Lynn Sherr (born March 4, 1942) is an American broadcast journalist and author, best known as a correspondent for the ABC news magazine 20/20.

== Life ==
Sherr was born in Philadelphia, Pennsylvania, and attended Lower Merion High School in Ardmore. She received a B.A. from Wellesley College.

She was a freelance host at WNET-TV in New York City, then staff. She worked for the Associated Press and WCBS-TV. In 1977, she was the guest host of the MacNeil–Lehrer Report while Robert MacNeil was absent, and has hosted a number of PBS specials. In 1983–85 she was a reporter/editor for Condé Nast. In 1986, Sherr was a candidate for NASA's Journalist in Space Project and became one of the finalists.

In 2008, Sherr left the television network ABC after working with them for 31 years. She is the author of Outside the Box: A Memoir, published in September 2006, which chronicles her life on and off TV, including her husband's death from cancer as well as her own battle with colon cancer.

She received a 1994 George Foster Peabody Award along with producer Alan B. Goldberg for the "Hunger Inside" a 20/20 documentary about extreme anorexia.

== Feminism ==
Sherr is a feminist.

With Jurate Kazickas, Sherr published the Liberated Women's Appointment Calendar and Survival Handbook annually for ten years, beginning in 1971.

Also with Kazickas, Sherr published the American Woman's Gazetteer in 1976, listing places in the US where women had featured in historic events; an updated version, titled Susan B. Anthony Slept Here, was published in 1994.

Sherr has twice (in 1989 and 1992) been the recipient of the Planned Parenthood Federation of America's (PPFA) Margaret Sanger Award (known as the "Maggie"), which is awarded to journalists for "exceptional coverage of reproductive rights and health care issues" in the view of PPFA. She also hosted PPFA's Maggie Awards luncheon in 2010.

Sherr has rejected calls for a "new feminism" and remarked, "What's wrong with the old feminism?" She strongly criticized Sarah Palin for calling herself a feminist: "What, exactly, has she done legislatively for other women? What paths has she forged?"

Sherr was featured in the Jewish Women's Archive web feature Jewish Women and the Feminist Revolution.

== Published works ==
Title	Year	ISBN	Publisher	Subject matter	Interviews, presentations, and reviews	Comments
Susan B. Anthony Slept Here: A Guide to American Women's Landmarks	1994	ISBN 9780812922233	Three Rivers Press			Co-author with Jurate Kazickas
Failure Is Impossible: Susan B. Anthony in Her Own Words	1996	ISBN 9780307765291	Crown Publishing Group	Susan B. Anthony	Booknotes interview with Sherr on Failure Is Impossible, May 5, 1995, C-SPAN	
Tall Blondes: A Book About Giraffes	1997	ISBN 9780836227697	Andrews McMeel Publishing	Giraffes		
America the Beautiful: The Stirring True Story Behind Our Nations's Favorite Song	2001	ISBN 9781586480851	PublicAffairs	America the Beautiful	Discussion with Sherr on America the Beautiful, November 27, 2001, C-SPAN	
Outside the Box: A Memoir	2006	ISBN 9781605297866	Rodale Press		Presentation by Sherr on Outside the Box, October 4, 2006, C-SPAN	
Swim: Why We Love the Water	2012	ISBN 9781610390477	PublicAffairs	Swimming		
Sally Ride: America's First Woman in Space	2014	ISBN 9781476725789	Simon and Schuster	Sally Ride	Presentation by Sherr on Sally Ride, June 25, 2014, C-SPAN; Presentation by Sherr on Sally Ride, August 30, 2014, C-SPAN; Presentation by Sherr on Sally Ride, February 14, 2015, C-SPAN	
