= Timothy S. Bitsberger =

American banker

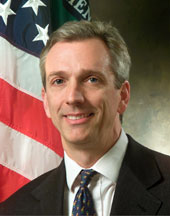
Timothy S. Bitsberger

Timothy S. Bitsberger is a United States banker who was Assistant Secretary of the Treasury for Financial Markets from 2004 to 2005.

== Biography ==
Timothy S. Bitsberger was educated at Yale University, receiving a B.A. in Economics in 1981, and at Harvard Business School, receiving an M.B.A. in 1985.

Bitsberger worked as a trader at Drexel Burnham Lambert from 1985 to 1989. From 1989 to 1998, he was Senior Trading manager and Vice President of NationsBank. He spent 1999 working as a consultant for J.F. Lehman & Company before becoming Vice President of Salomon Smith Barney later in the year.

In October 2001, United States Secretary of the Treasury Paul O'Neill selected Bitsberger as an Advisor to Assistant Secretary of the Treasury for Financial Markets Richard S. Carnell. Bitsberger took over as Assistant Secretary of the Treasury for Financial Markets in 2004, holding that office until 2005.

Upon leaving government service, Bitsberger became Senior Vice President and Treasurer of Freddie Mac, holding that position until 2008. He joined BancAccess Financial in 2009.

Government offices
Preceded by Richard S. Carnell	Assistant Secretary of the Treasury for Financial Markets; 2004–2005	Succeeded by Anthony Ryan
