= Under Secretary of the Treasury for Domestic Finance =

Official in the US Treasury Department

- Flag of an under secretary of the treasury
- Department of the Treasury
- Style: The Honorable
- Reports to: Secretary of the Treasury; Deputy Secretary of the Treasury
- Nominator: President of the United States
- Salary: $183,300 (2021)
- Website: Official website

The under secretary of the treasury for domestic finance is a high-ranking position within United States Department of the Treasury that reports to, advises, and assists the secretary of the treasury and the deputy secretary of the treasury. The under secretary leads the department's policy on the issues of domestic finance, fiscal policy, fiscal operations, government assets, government liabilities, and other related economic and fiscal matters.

Under Secretary Mary J. Miller announced she was stepping down from the position on June 12, 2014, and the position was officially vacant until July 2021.

Matthew Rutherford served as acting under secretary until January 30, 2015. President Barack Obama nominated Antonio Weiss for the position on November 13, 2014. Weiss was never confirmed by the Senate, and withdrew his nomination on January 12, 2015. On April 22, 2021 President Joe Biden nominated economist Nellie Liang for Senate confirmation in the position. Liang was confirmed by the Senate on July 14, 2021.

== Overview ==
The under secretary has oversight of the following:

- Assistant Secretary of the Treasury for Financial Institutions
  - Office of Financial Institutions
    - Office of Financial Institutions Policy
    - Office of Consumer Policy
    - Office of Housing, Small Business, and Community Development
      - Community Development Financial Institutions Fund
- Assistant Secretary of the Treasury for Financial Markets
  - Office of Financial Markets
    - Office of Federal Finance
    - Office of Government Financial Policy
    - Office of Capital Markets
- Fiscal Assistant Secretary of the Treasury
  - Office of Fiscal Service
    - Office of Fiscal Operations and Policy
    - Office of Accounting Policy
    - Bureau of the Fiscal Service

== List of under secretaries of the treasury for domestic finance (incomplete) ==
Name	Assumed office	Left office	President appointed by	Secretary served under
George D. Gould	1985	1988	Ronald Reagan	James Baker
Robert R. Glauber	1989	1992	George H. W. Bush	Nicholas F. Brady
Jerome Powell	April 7, 1992	January 20, 1993	George H. W. Bush	Nicholas F. Brady
Frank N. Newman	November 5, 1993	September 28, 1994	Bill Clinton	Lloyd Bentsen
John D. Hawke, Jr.	April 1995	December 8, 1998	Bill Clinton	Robert Rubin
Gary Gensler	April 1999	January 20, 2001	Bill Clinton	Lawrence Summers
Peter R. Fisher	2001	2004	George W. Bush	Paul O'Neill
Peter R. Fisher	2001	2004	George W. Bush	John W. Snow
Brian C. Roseboro	2004	2005	George W. Bush	John W. Snow
Randal Quarles	August 8, 2005	October 13, 2006	George W. Bush	John W. Snow
Randal Quarles	August 8, 2005	October 13, 2006	George W. Bush	Henry Paulson
Robert K. Steel	October 10, 2006	July 9, 2008	George W. Bush	Henry Paulson
Anthony Ryan (Acting)	July 9, 2008	2009	George W. Bush	Henry Paulson
Michael Barr (Acting)	May 2009	March 27, 2010	Barack Obama	Timothy Geithner
Jeffrey A. Goldstein	March 27, 2010	August 2011	Barack Obama	Timothy Geithner
Mary J. Miller	March 2012	September 2014	Barack Obama	Timothy Geithner
Matthew S. Rutherford (Acting)	September 2014	January 30, 2015	Barack Obama	Jack Lew
Nellie Liang	July 22, 2021	January 20, 2025	Joe Biden	Janet Yellen
Brian Smith (Acting)	January 20, 2025	July 29, 2025	Donald Trump	Scott Bessent
Luke Pettit (Acting)	July 29, 2025	October 10, 2025	Donald Trump	Scott Bessent
Jonathan McKernan	October 10, 2025	July 20, 2026	Donald Trump	Scott Bessent
