= Nellie Liang =

American economist (born 1958)

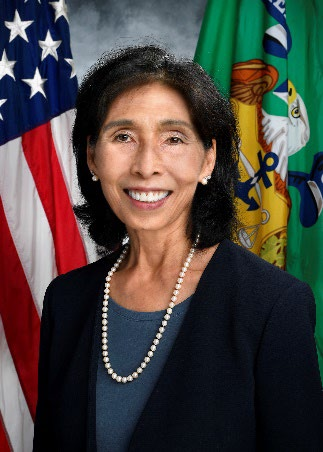

Under Secretary of the Treasury for Domestic Finance
- In office July 22, 2021 – January 20, 2025
- President: Joe Biden
- Preceded by: Mary J. Miller (2014)
- Succeeded by: Jonathan McKernan

Personal details
- Born: Jean Nellie Liang; 1958 (age 67–68)
- Party: Democratic
- Education: University of Notre Dame (BA); University of Maryland, College Park (MA, PhD)

Chinese name
- Chinese: 梁内利
- Hanyu Pinyin: Liáng Nèilì

Jean Nellie Liang (born 1958) is an American economist. She served as Under Secretary of the Treasury for Domestic Finance in the Biden administration from 2021 to 2025.

== Education ==
Liang graduated from the University of Notre Dame with a B.A. in economics in 1979. She later completed an M.A. (1984) and Ph.D. (1986) in economics at the University of Maryland, College Park. Liang's doctoral thesis was An empirical conjectural variation model of oligopoly.

== Career ==
Prior to her government service, Liang was a private sector economist in Washington, D. C., starting at Wharton Econometric Forecasting Associates from 1979 to 1980, then at Data Resources Inc. from 1980 to 1981. From 1981 to 1984, Liang taught economics at the University of Maryland, College Park. In the summer of 1983, Liang was an economist for MCI Inc. Liang was a research associate at the Bureau of Economics at the Federal Trade Commission from 1985 to 1986.

After completing her doctorate, Liang joined the Federal Reserve Board as an economist at the financial structure division in 1986. After eight years at financial structure, Liang moved to the capital markets section in 1994. Liang headed the capital markets section from 1997 to 2001. In 2001, Liang became assistant director for research and statistics for the Federal Reserve Board. The Fed promoted Liang to senior associate director in 2006. In 2010, Liang became the founding director of the Division of Financial Stability.

Liang left the Fed after nearly 30 years to become Miriam K. Carliner Senior Fellow in Economic Studies at the Brookings Institution in February 2017. At Brookings, her research focused on financial and macroeconomic stability, credit markets, and financial regulatory and macroprudential policies. She additionally served as Senior Lecturer at Yale School of Management.

=== Federal Reserve Board Nomination ===
Liang was nominated by President Trump for membership on the Federal Reserve Board on September 19, 2018. She withdrew herself as a nominee on January 7, 2019, after months passed without the United States Senate granting her a hearing. Liang cited the possibility of being left in "professional limbo" as her reason for her withdrawal.

=== U.S. Department of the Treasury ===
Liang was announced as a nominee by President Biden to serve as Under Secretary for Domestic Finance at the U.S. Department of the Treasury on March 11, 2021. The Senate confirmed Liang on July 15, 2021, in a 72–27 vote. She was sworn into office on July 22, 2021, and is the first Senate-confirmed Under Secretary for Domestic Finance in office since September 2014. On February 15, 2022, the secretary presented findings of the President's Working Group on Financial Markets and other agencies on potential congressional regulation of the stablecoin markets.

At Treasury, Liang has been instrumental in leading the department's efforts to address stablecoins, arguing that stablecoins need to be brought into the U.S. public policy framework. Additionally, Liang played a leading role in producing a number of reports for the Treasury Department in response to President Biden's Executive Order on Ensuring Responsible Development in Digital Assets. On March 1, 2023, Liang provided a substantive address on the Biden Administration's approach to the future of money and payments and, more specifically, on central bank digital currency.

Liang has also lead the Treasury Department's work on policy surrounding banks and nonbanks. Liang is supportive of macroprudential financial regulation approaches taken to date, but has argued that policymakers and regulators must continue to look ahead for emerging threats.

Following the failure of Silicon Valley Bank, Liang testified to the Senate Banking Committee on March 28, 2023, and the House Financial Services Committee on March 29, 2023. Liang detailed the efforts the U.S. Department of the Treasury was taking to respond to the failures of several U.S. banks. Liang also spoke on systemic liquidity risk and financial system resilience following the bank failure.
