= Anthony Ryan (Treasury official) =

United States banker

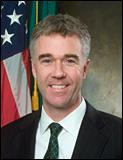
Anthony Ryan

Anthony William Ryan is a United States banker who was Assistant Secretary of the Treasury for Financial Markets from 2006 to 2008 and Acting Under Secretary of the Treasury for Domestic Finance from 2008 to 2009.

== Biography ==
Anthony Ryan was educated at the University of Rochester, receiving a bachelor's degree in 1985, and the London School of Economics, receiving a master's degree in 1986.

Ryan joined the Boston Company as a manager in 1987. The next year, he joined PanAgora Asset Management as a manager of Global Investments, working there until 1994. From 1994 to 2000, he was a principal of State Street Global Advisors. He was a partner and head of client relations at GMO LLC from 2000 to 2006.

In 2006, Ryan became Assistant Secretary of the Treasury for Financial Markets, holding that office until 2008. He was Acting Under Secretary of the Treasury for Domestic Finance from 2008 to 2009.

Ryan became the Chief Administrative Officer of Fidelity Investments in 2009.

In 2011, Ryan became the Chief Executive Officer of Arrowstreet Capital.

Government offices
Preceded by Timothy S. Bitsberger	Assistant Secretary of the Treasury for Financial Markets; 2006 — 2008	Succeeded by Karthik Ramanathan
Preceded by Robert K. Steel	Under Secretary of the Treasury for Domestic Finance (Acting); 2008–2009	Succeeded by Michael Barr (Acting); Jeffrey A. Goldstein
