= Jurate Kazickas =

American journalist and activist

- Jūratė Kazickaitė
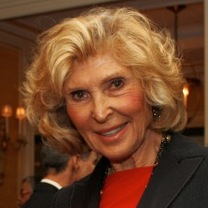
- Kazickas in 2013
- Born: Jūratė Kristina Kazickas; February 18, 1943 (age 83); Vilnius, Lithuania
- Other name: Jurate Kazickas-Altman
- Education: Trinity Washington University
- Occupation: Journalist
- Spouse: Roger Altman (m. 1981)
- Children: 3
- Father: Juozas Kazickas

Jūratė Kristina Kazickas-Altman (born February 18, 1943) is a retired American journalist and campaigner for refugee rights. She was born in Lithuania during World War II, and her family fled ahead of the 1944 Soviet re-occupation. After graduating from Trinity Washington University, Kazickas worked as a volunteer teacher in Kenya with the Consolata Missionaries. She met some US soldiers on leave from the Vietnam War while traveling in Asia and decided to report from the conflict. Kazickas reported from the front lines for about a year before being wounded by artillery fire at the Battle of Khe Sanh and returning to the US.

Kazickas later reported on the women's liberation movement for the Associated Press and, with Lynn Sherr, published the Liberated Women's Appointment Calendar and Survival Handbook annually for ten years. In 1976, with Sherr, she wrote the American Woman's Gazetteer, a listing of locations in the country associated with women in historic events. Kazickas reported from the 1973 Yom Kippur War and on the Office of the First Lady Rosalynn Carter. In recent years, Kazickas has advocated for refugee rights and been president of a family charity supporting education in Lithuania.

== Early life ==
Kazickas was born to Joseph and Alexandra Kazickas in Vilnius in German-occupied Lithuania in 1943. Her father was an opponent of communism and after the Soviet re-occupation of 1944 he and his family fled to the West. At one point they escaped detection on a train when German soldiers agreed to hide them under a pile of bandages. After the train reached the end of the line at Dresden, Germany, the family stayed there until the Allied bombing that devastated that city on February 13, 1945. The family found their way to an American-run displaced persons camp.

After the end of the war Kazickas and her parents traveled to the US on the SS Ernie Pyle, a former type C4-class troopship used to transfer displaced persons arriving on US soil on February 18, 1947. Kazickas attended The Ursuline School in New York and received a Bachelor of Arts degree from Trinity Washington University. After a period as a volunteer teacher with the Consolata Missionaries in Kenya, during which she climbed Kilimanjaro in tennis shoes at the age of 22, she worked for Look magazine.

== Vietnam ==
Kazickas became interested in the Vietnam War during a solo hiking trip in Asia. She encountered some US soldiers on leave in Bangkok and, on their recommendation, visited Saigon. Determined to return, she sought a position there as a journalist. Unable to secure official accreditation and payment of expenses she bought her own airline ticket using US$500 she won as a contestant on the gameshow Password.

Kazickas arrived in Vietnam in 1967. Her first article on the war was published in Mademoiselle within a few months. Kazickas was initially denied permission to report from the field, despite repeated requests. She was granted permission to join her first patrol, from the Khe Sanh Combat Base, but had to withdraw early when her designated US Army escort, a clerk, pulled a muscle and could not keep up with the rest of the patrol. After she and the clerk were evacuated the patrol came under attack and its commander was killed. Kazickas felt guilty that the arrival of the helicopter might have alerted North Vietnamese forces to the location of the patrol; she never wrote an article about the event. Kazickas later discovered that the patrol had returned to base unharmed and was attacked only after it went back into the field to assist another unit that came under attack.

Kazickas first came under fire at Pleiku in June 1967. Among US Marines a superstition grew up that wherever Kazickas reported from would come under artillery fire soon after. Reporting from within a unit of the 101st Airborne in August the party came under artillery fire that caused heavy casualties, Kazickas put away her camera and volunteered to help provide medical aid to the wounded. In November 1967 she reported from the Battle of Dak To.

The Battle of Khe Sanh began in January 1968. Journalists, particularly freelancers like Kazickas, struggled to reach the base as only ten were officially permitted there at any one time. Kazickas knew that as a woman she was often able to persuade the male military helicopter pilots to take her aboard without official sanction and so reached Khe Sanh on March 7. She was wounded on the day of her arrival by a rocket attack, with shrapnel in her cheek, legs, forearm and buttocks. She recovered from the physical wounds within a week but was affected mentally by the experience. Concerned for her safety she left Vietnam in May 1968.

== Later ==
By 1969 Kazickas was working for the Associated Press (AP) in New York, for whom she covered the women's liberation movement. With a colleague, Lynn Sherr, she established the Liberated Women's Appointment Calendar and Survival Handbook, which had a humorous tone. It took a long time to get published but its first release in 1971 was covered extensively in press and on TV. Annual editions appeared for 10 years. With Sherr, Kazickas also published the American Woman's Gazetteer in 1976, listing places in the US where women had featured in historic events; an updated version, titled Susan B. Anthony Slept Here, was published in 1994.

In October 1973 Kazickas covered the Yom Kippur War for the AP. She was later assistant editor of the Washington Life section of The Washington Star. During the presidency of Jimmy Carter (1977 to 1981) she was a White House correspondent, covering the Office of the First Lady, Rosalynn Carter.

On December 6, 1981, at Holy Trinity Catholic Church in Washington DC, Kazickas married Roger Altman, investment banker and then Assistant Secretary of the Treasury for Carter.

Kazickas became an advocate for refugees and has visited Bosnia, Rwanda, Pakistan and Afghanistan. In 2010, she received an award from the International Rescue Committee for her work in this field. Kazickas is a member of the board of the Women's Refugee Commission and president of the Kazickas Family Foundation, a charity supporting education in Lithuania. Kazickas climbed Kilimanjaro again in 2011. In 2013, Kazickas was one of 21 women named "leaders for the 21st century" by Women's eNews. She lives in New York City and has three children.

== Bibliography ==
- Atwood, Kathryn; Evans, Diane (2018). Courageous Women of the Vietnam War: Medics, Journalists, Survivors, and More. Chicago Review Press. p. 106. ISBN 978-1-61373-077-5.
