= Lewis A. Sachs =

American banker and government official

Lee Sachs
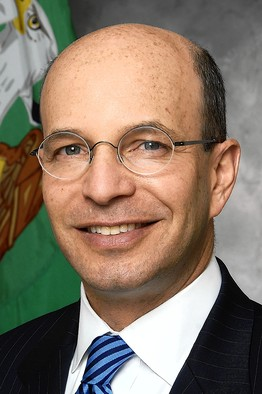

Assistant Secretary of the Treasury for Financial Markets
- In office 1999–2001
- President: Bill Clinton
- Preceded by: Gary Gensler
- Succeeded by: Richard S. Carnell

Personal details
- Born: 1963 (age 62–63)
- Education: Denison University (BA)

Lewis A. "Lee" Sachs is a United States banker who was Assistant Secretary of the Treasury for Financial Markets from 1999 to 2001.

== Biography ==
Lee Sachs was raised in Short Hills, New Jersey, and educated at Denison University, receiving a B.A. in Economics and Political Science in 1985.

Sachs worked at Bear Stearns from 1985 to 1998, becoming a senior managing director in 1991 and later head of Global Capital Markets, and a member of the board of directors.

Sachs joined the United States Department of the Treasury in 1998 as deputy assistant secretary for Government Financial Policy, a senior advisor to United States Secretary of the Treasury Robert Rubin and chairman of the steering committee of the President's Working Group on Financial Markets. President of the United States Bill Clinton nominated Sachs to be Assistant Secretary of the Treasury for Financial Markets in 1999, and Sachs subsequently held that office until 2001.

Upon leaving government service, Sachs became vice chairman of Perseus, LLC, holding that position until 2003. He was then the chief executive officer of Cornerstone Asset Management from 2003 to 2005. He then joined Mariner Investment Group as chairman of the firm's investment committee.

Sachs is now co-founder and managing director of Gallatin Point Capital.

Political offices
Preceded by Gary Gensler	Assistant Secretary of the Treasury for Financial Markets; 1999–2001	Succeeded by Richard S. Carnell
