= Roger Altman =

American investment banker

5th United States Deputy Secretary of the Treasury
- In office January 20, 1993 – August 17, 1994
- President: Bill Clinton
- Preceded by: John Robson
- Succeeded by: Frank Newman

Personal details
- Born: Roger Charles Altman; April 2, 1946 (age 80) Brookline, Massachusetts, U.S.
- Party: Democratic
- Spouse: Jurate Kazickas (m. 1981)
- Children: 3
- Education: Georgetown University (BA); University of Chicago (MBA)

Roger Charles Altman (born April 2, 1946) is an American investment banker, the founder and senior chairman of Evercore, and a former Democratic politician. He served as Assistant Secretary of the Treasury in the Carter administration from January 1977 until January 1981 and as Deputy Secretary of the Treasury in the Clinton administration from January 1993 until he resigned in August 1994, amid the Whitewater controversy.

== Early life and education ==
Altman was born in Brookline, Massachusetts, and was raised in Boston as a Catholic. His father, a food broker, died when he was 10 years old, and his mother, a librarian, raised Altman and his brother as a single mother. He attended the Roxbury Latin School.

He attended Georgetown University, where he met future President Bill Clinton, and earned a Bachelor of Arts degree in 1967. In 1969 he earned an MBA from the University of Chicago Booth School of Business, but took time off in 1968 to work in Indiana organizing volunteers for Robert F. Kennedy's presidential campaign.

== Career ==
=== Early career ===
After graduating from business school in 1969, Altman began working at Lehman Brothers, where he grew close to chairman Peter G. Peterson. In 1974, he was made general partner at the age of 28—the youngest in Lehman's history. He left Lehman in 1977 to serve as Assistant Secretary for Domestic Finance in the U.S. Treasury from 1977 to 1981 under President Jimmy Carter, for whom he had fundraised when Carter was Governor of Georgia, and campaigned for in 1976, as well as working on his transition team. As Assistant Secretary, Altman played a "role in negotiating the Federal Government's $1.5 billion bailout of the Chrysler Corporation."

In 1981, he returned to Lehman Brothers, where he became the co-head of investment banking and served on the board of the company and the management committee. During the 1980s, he was a lecturer and adjunct professor at the Yale University School of Management. In 1987, Altman joined the Blackstone Group as vice-chairman and head of its mergers and acquisitions advisory business. During the Reagan-Bush years, he fundraised for Democratic politicians such as Vice President Walter F. Mondale, Massachusetts governor Michael S. Dukakis, and Arkansas governor Bill Clinton. He also advised two New York City mayors, Ed Koch and David N. Dinkins.

=== Clinton administration ===
When Bill Clinton was elected in 1992, he urged U.S. treasury secretary Lloyd Bentsen to take Altman on as his deputy secretary. He was confirmed in January 1993. Once on the job, Altman was viewed as "the favorite to succeed the 73-year-old Treasury Secretary," and he played a large role in some of the Clinton administration's biggest legislative victories, such as the passage of the Omnibus Budget Reconciliation Act of 1993 and the "approval of the North American Free Trade Agreement." He was associated with the moderate economic policies of the Clinton administration" and had a reputation as a "deficit hawk."

However, he resigned in 1994, after it was revealed that Altman had notified the Clinton White House of the criminal referrals made by the Resolution Trust Corporation. After nearly 15 hours of testimony in February 1993 before the House and Senate Banking Committees, he submitted his resignation in August 1994, saying that he hoped his resignation would "help to diminish the controversy." He was succeeded by Frank N. Newman, who was the Under Secretary for Domestic Finance at the time.

=== Return to private sector ===
In 1995, instead of returning to Blackstone, he co-founded Evercore, an "independent investment banking advisory firm" in New York City, and currently serves as its chairman. By 2014, Evercore was "a major player," and its investment management arm had more than $14 billion in assets under management, with its investment banking advisory arm boasting $1.5 trillion in "announced transactions." Evercore advised General Motors through its bankruptcy, and was paid $46 million by GM pre-bankruptcy. However, when it asked for a $17.9 million "success fee," a U.S. bankruptcy trustee called the fees "staggering," "inordinately large," and "clearly [exceeding] the bounds of reasonableness" given that "Evercore had no success at finding a purchaser or funder for the Debtors."

Politically, Altman continued to stay in the loop. He advised two presidential candidates—John Kerry in 2004, and Hillary Clinton in 2008. In 2010, President Barack Obama interviewed him as a potential candidate to replace Larry Summers as his National Economic Council director, a job that ultimately went to Gene Sperling.

== Other activities ==
Altman has sat on the Board of Trustees of New York-Presbyterian Hospital since 2006, Vice Chairman of the Board of the American Museum of Natural History, and Chairman of New Visions for Public Schools. Additionally, he is a member of the Council on Foreign Relations, a Director of Conservation International, and an Advisory Council member for The Hamilton Project, a Brookings Institution economic policy initiative.

Altman is listed as a member of the Steering Committee of The Bilderberg Group, a controversial group of influential business and government leaders who meet annually behind closed doors to foster dialogue between Europe and North America. He participated in all their conferences between 2008 and 2016.

== Personal life ==
His first marriage to Barbara ended in divorce, and he remarried at age 35 to journalist Jurate Kazickas in 1981. The Rev. James N. English of Holy Trinity Roman Catholic Church in Washington, D.C. performed the marriage ceremony at the San Luis Rey Chapel at Cat Cay in the Bahamas. They have three children. In 1992, he collapsed while jogging in Central Park due to an irregular heartbeat. His hobbies include jogging, skiing, fly-fishing, and tennis.

== Selected writings ==
- "The Great Crash, 2008: A Geopolitical Setback for the West". Foreign Affairs. 88 (1). January–February 2009.
- "Obama's Business Plan". The New York Times. July 19, 2010.
- (with Richard Haass) "American Profligacy and American Power: The Consequences of Fiscal Irresponsibility". Foreign Affairs. 89 (6). November–December 2010.
- "The Fall and Rise of the West: Why America and Europe Will Emerge Stronger From the Financial Crisis". Foreign Affairs. 92 (1). January–February 2013.

Political offices
Preceded by John Robson	United States Deputy Secretary of the Treasury; 1993–1994	Succeeded by Frank Newman
