= Jonathan McKernan =

American government official

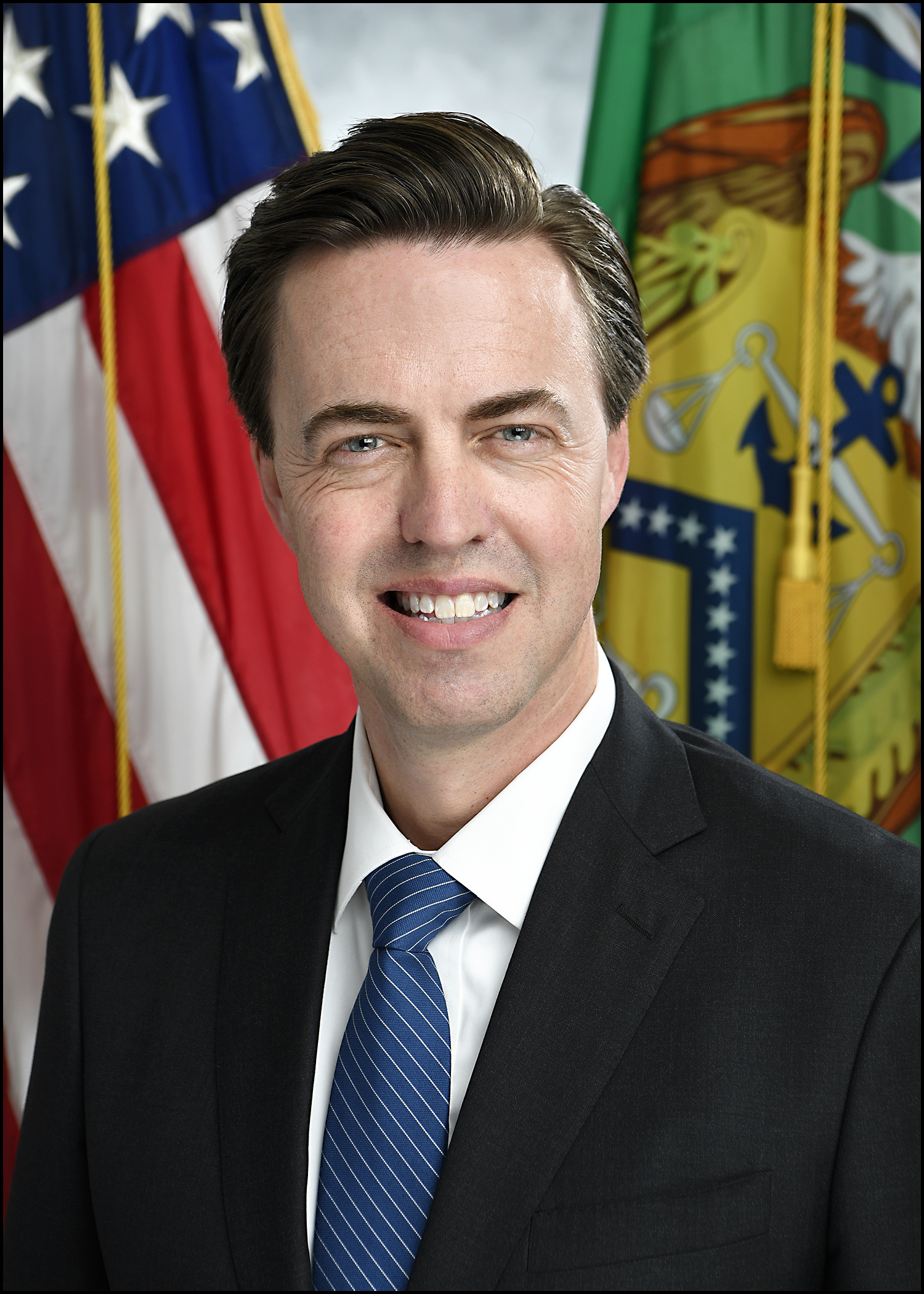
- Official portrait, 2026

Under Secretary of the Treasury for Domestic Finance
- In office October 10, 2025 – July 20, 2026
- President: Donald Trump
- Preceded by: Nellie Liang

Member of the Board of Directors of the Federal Deposit Insurance Corporation
- In office January 5, 2023 – February 10, 2025
- President: Joe Biden; Donald Trump
- Preceded by: Jelena McWilliams
- Succeeded by: Vacant

Personal details
- Party: Republican
- Education: University of Tennessee (BA, MA); Duke University (JD)

Jonathan P. McKernan is an American lawyer who had served Under Secretary of the Treasury for Domestic Finance. He was previously was a member of the board of directors of the Federal Deposit Insurance Corporation (FDIC).

== Early life and education ==
McKernan attended the University of Tennessee, where he earned a Bachelor of Arts and Master of Arts in economics, and the Duke University School of Law, where he received a Juris Doctor with high honors. He is married.

== Career ==
After his education, McKernan became a banking lawyer and worked for Wilmer Cutler Pickering Hale, Dorr LLP and Hogan Lovells US LLP. In 2017, he became an aide to U.S. Senator Bob Corker of Tennessee, advising him on financial issues. Soon after, he joined the United States Department of the Treasury where he helped draft the Treasury Housing Reform Plan in September 2019. In October 2019, he was named senior counsel for policy at the Federal Housing Finance Agency (FHFA). He later served as a counsel to Senator Pat Toomey on the staff of the Senate Committee on Banking, Housing, and Urban Affairs.

In September 2022, McKernan was nominated by President Joe Biden to serve on the board of directors of the Federal Deposit Insurance Corporation (FDIC) as part of the Republican minority. He was sworn in as a member of the board of directors on January 5, 2023. At the FDIC, McKernan "sought tougher scrutiny of the stakes that the nation's largest asset managers have in banks," and he co-led a special committee that investigated "allegations of the agency's toxic workplace and pushed for reforms." He announced his resignation from the FDIC on February 10, 2025, stating that his term had expired.

On February 11, 2025, President Donald Trump nominated McKernan to serve as director of the Consumer Financial Protection Bureau (CFPB). McKernan's nomination was supported by numerous business groups. During his confirmation hearings, McKernan criticized the CFPB for being overly aggressive against financial institutions during the Biden administration. McKernan said, "We've got to refocus it on its mission. We need to right-size it, make sure that we have an efficient CFPB and we need to reinstate some accountability to our elected officials."

On May 9, 2025, President Trump withdrew McKernan's name from serving as director of the CFPB and submitted his nomination to serve as the Under Secretary of the Treasury for Domestic Finance. He was confirmed by the Senate on October 7, 2025.

Government offices
Preceded by Rohit Chopra	Director of the Consumer Financial Protection Bureau; Nominee	Succeeded by TBD
Preceded by Jelena McWilliams	Member of the Board of Directors of the Federal Deposit Insurance Corporation; 2023–2025	Succeeded by Vacant
