= Journalist in Space Project =

NASA program

- Duration: 1985–1986
- Goals: To inform the public about spaceflight
- Achieved: Postponed indefinitely and later cancelled after the Space Shuttle Challenger disaster.
- Organizer: NASA
- Related programs: Teacher in Space Project

The Journalist in Space Project was a NASA program designed to inform the public about spaceflight. Journalists would have flown in space on NASA's Space Shuttle. Some forty finalists were selected from over 1,700 applications, but the project was postponed indefinitely and subsequently cancelled after the Space Shuttle Challenger disaster in 1986.

== Origins ==
From the earliest days of the Space Shuttle program, the National Air and Space Administration (NASA) had assumed that as experience with the Space Shuttle increased the safety of space flight, civilian passengers would be able to be taken along; journalists were specifically mentioned as likely candidates. In 1985, as the Space Shuttle flights became more routine, NASA asked the Association of Schools of Journalism and Mass Communication (ASJMC) to recommend journalists who could ride on the Space Shuttle as passengers as part of its Journalist in Space Project. The goal of the Journalist in Space Project was not simply to fly a journalist in space as a passenger, but to inform the public about spaceflight.

The ASJMC was formed in 1984 from the merger of two existing organizations. With its headquarters at the University of South Carolina College of Journalism in Columbia, South Carolina, it represented schools of journalism in 170 colleges and universities across the United States. The Journalist in Space Project was the ASJMC's first major project, and NASA's second citizens in space project after the Teacher in Space Project announced the year before. The ASJMC received US$50,000 (equivalent to $147,000 in 2025) in funding for the project. Albert Scroggins, the dean emeritus of the University of South Carolina College of Journalism, was appointed its chief program officer.

== Selection ==
The ASJMC established a steering committee to coordinate the selection process. It met with representatives of professional journalist organizations on 16 October 1985, and created a Journalism Advisory Committee to liaise with them about the selection process. The main concerns were that the selection criteria should be broad, so as to maximise the number of people who would be eligible, and that there should as few restrictions on their reporting as possible. The Journalist in Space Project was publicly announced at a NASA press conference on 24 October 1985. Press releases were sent out, and the ASJMC published announcements in professional magazines. Copies of the announcement were sent directly to the Asian American Journalists Association, the California Chicano News Media Association, the National Association of Hispanic Journalists, the Native American Press Association, the Overseas Press Club of America, and the organizations represented on the Journalism Advisory Committee.

To be eligible to participate, applicants had to be:

- A United States citizen;
- With five or more years of professional experience in US-based print or broadcast journalism covering contemporary events as a full-time reporter, correspondent, columnist, photographer or editorial cartoonist;
- And the approval or support of their employer;
- But not a US government employee, a former NASA employee, or the spouse of a present NASA employee.

The individuals chosen to participate would receive training from NASA, and form part of a press pool for the period of training, the flight itself, and for up to thirty days afterwards. They would be free and encouraged to report as they chose, subject to privacy and national security concerns.

Applications opened on 1 December 1985 and had to be submitted by 15 January 1986. Application packages containing the necessary forms were mailed out to everyone who wrote in or telephoned a request. The forms did not include questions about the applicant's race, sex or age, as these were not considered relevant to the requirements of the project. Applicants were asked to provide three references and two samples of their work. They had to write two short essays, and were informed that interviews would be video recorded. They had to sign a form stating that they understood the requirements of the project. Most application forms were received in the last few days. They were randomly assigned to one of the regional selection panels in the region where the applicant lived. In all, there were 5,149 requests for applications, from which 1,705 applications were received. Of these, 728 were from newspaper journalists, 584 from broadcast journalists, 101 worked for magazines and 159 were freelance journalist. The remaining 133 worked for other media organizations and wire services.

Sam Donaldson, the ABC News White House correspondent, asked President Ronald Reagan for a reference, but this was declined on the grounds that it would be unfair to provide him with special treatment. Lynn Sherr asked her friend, astronaut Sally Ride, for a reference. "Fully aware that I would read what she wrote", Sherr recalled, "and no doubt convinced that she could arrange never to fly with a greenhorn like me (me, the Greek major who had avoided physics because botany seemed a more useful college major)—she typed out an essay that made me sound like Brenda Starr with wings."

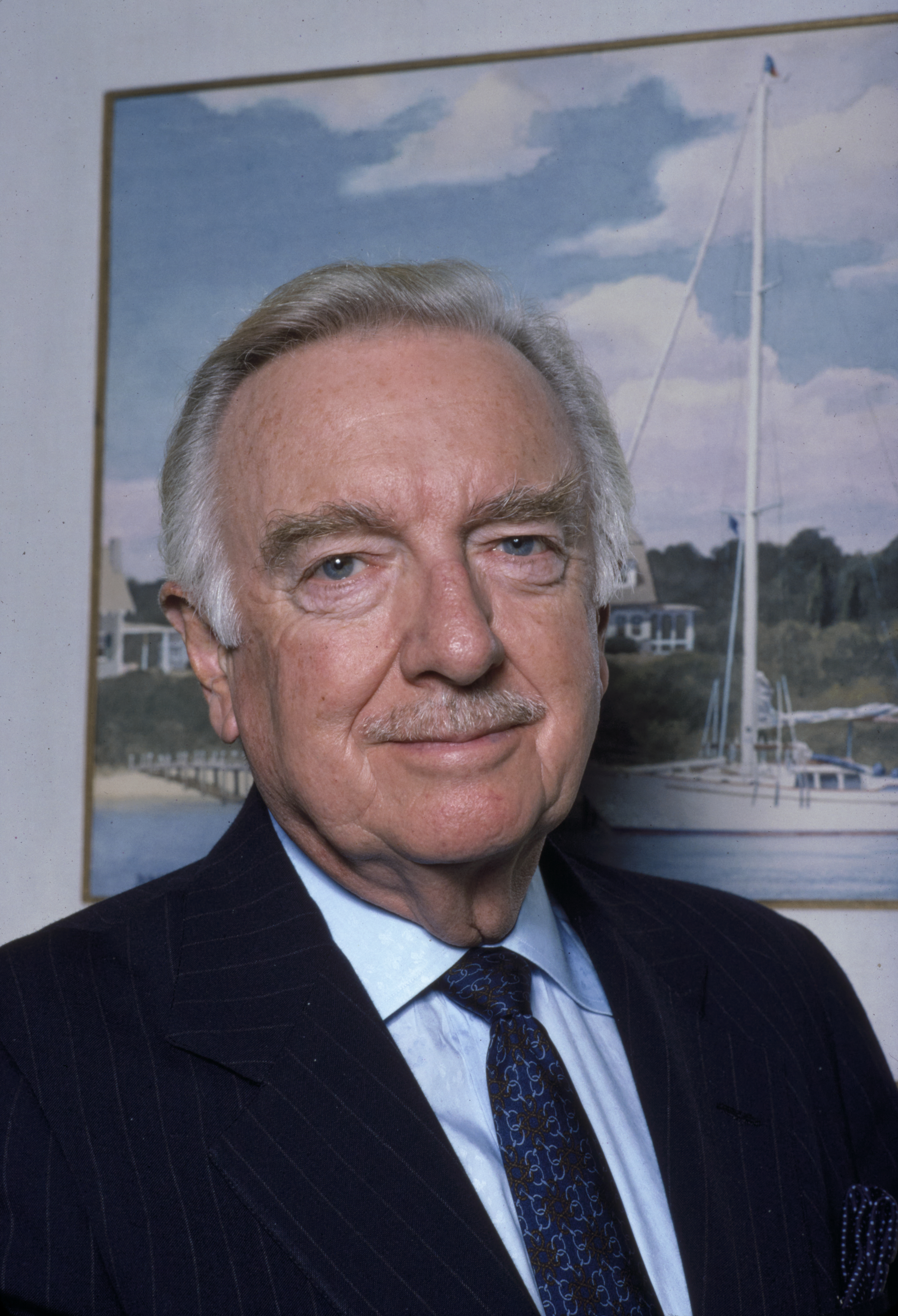
Finalist Walter Cronkite in 1983

In his application essay, Walter Cronkite wrote:

I do not agree that the men and women who have gone into space are so inarticulate or so narrowly focused that they've been unable to communicate with us groundlings... Even before television's superb pictures, our astronauts gave us an extraordinarily vivid sense of what it is like up there.

The principal thing that a journalist can offer is to free the public of the last lingering suspicion regarding reports from those who are part of the program; to guarantee that what is reported is free from control, or pressure, or even self interest.

In this sense the space-flying journalist will again be performing, as have all journalists through history, the role assigned him by our concept of a free press. He will be the people's surrogate, their eyes and ears in a situation in which the people themselves cannot participate.

The steering committee divided the United States into five geographic regions. In each region, there were four cooperating schools and one coordinating school which hosted the selection panels, of which there were four in each region. They consisting of working journalists and academics from the journalism faculty of colleges and universities in the region. At least three members of each panel had to be working journalists, and print and broadcast journalists were on every panel. Efforts were also made to ensure that the panels had good demographic representation. The method of scoring and ranking candidates was left entirely up to the individual section panels. NASA gave final approval to the selection process on 18 November 1985.

The selection panels would recommend five candidates each. A regional panel would interview the twenty semifinalists from its region, and select the best eight. The forty national semifinalists would then attend a national workshop and orientation event, during which they would be interviewed by a national selection panel consisting of fourteen journalists and academics, and former astronaut Terry Hart. This panel would select the best five. These five finalists would undergo medical and background checks, and then be interviewed by the NASA's seven-person Space Flight Participant Evaluation Committee, the same committee that had selected the candidates for the Teacher in Space Project. They would select the prime and backup candidates for the mission, The mission was scheduled to be flown on the Space Shuttle Challenger on 27 September 1986.

The project was immediately and indefinitely suspended after the Space Shuttle Challenger disaster on 28 January 1986. Astronaut Michael Smith, who was to have flown on the 27 September mission, was among those killed. NASA and the ASJMC reviewed the project, and agreed to continue with the selection process. The regional selection panels commenced work on 2 March and completed their selections by 5 April. The semifinalists were then contacted and asked if they wished to continue. Two candidates withdrew at this point, and were replaced by alternative choices of the selection panels. The identity of the 100 regional semifinalists was publicly announced on 16 April. The applicants who were not selected were notified of their non-selection. All applicants were sent a personalized certificate of recognition for their participation in the project.

Meanwhile, the steering committee had developed a set of standard procedures for video taped interviews of the 100 semifinalists. Although the project (and the whole Space Shuttle program) was under a cloud, NASA and the ASJMC decided to continue with the next phase of selection. Interviews were conducted between 27 April and 13 May, and the forty finalists were publicly announced on 14 May 1986.

== Finalists ==
Of the forty national semifinalists, fifteen worked for newspapers, fourteen in radio or television, three for magazines, five were freelance journalists, and three worked for wire services.

| Name | Location | Occupation |
|---|---|---|
| Theresa M. (Terry) Anzur | Chicago, Illinois | Reporter for NBC News |
| James R. Asker | Houston, Texas | Science, technology and space reporter for the Houston Post |
| A. Blaine Baggett | Los Angeles, California | Executive producer at KCET-TV |
| Jay Barbree | Cocoa Beach, Florida | Southeastern correspondent for NBC News |
| Marcia Bartusiak | Norfolk, Virginia | freelance science writer |
| William B. Blakemore | New York, New York | Correspondent for ABC News |
| Ted Conover | Denver, Colorado | freelance writer |
| Walter L. Cronkite Jr. | New York, New York | Correspondent for CBS News |
| Morton N. Dean | Ridgefield, Connecticut | Correspondent for Independent Network News (INN) |
| Diane Eicher | Lakewood, Colorado | Health writer for the Denver Post |
| Joan M. Esposito | Chicago, Illinois | Reporter at WLS-TV |
| Timothy Ferris | Hollywood, California | Freelance journalist |
| Jerry M. Flint | New York, New York | National editor of Forbes magazine |
| Michael W. Gold | San Rafael, California | Contributing editor for Science 86 magazine; |
| Stan Grossfield | Squantum, Massachusetts | Director of photography at the Boston Globe |
| Richard Hart | San Francisco, California | Reporter at KPIX-TV |
| Paul G. Hayes | Milwaukee, Wisconsin | Science reporter at the Milwaukee Journal |
| Hal Higdon | Michigan City, Indiana | freelance writer |
| John C. Hockenberry | Chicago, Illinois | Reporter for National Public Radio |
| Jim Klobuchar | Minnetonka, Minnesota | Columnist at the Minneapolis Star and Tribune |
| Caroline T. (Terry) Marotta | Winchester, Massachusetts | Freelance journalist |
| Michael R. Masterson | Little Rock, Arkansas | Writer for WEHCO Media |
| Jay Matthews | Pasadena, California | Bureau chief for the Washington Post |
| Lee N. McEachern Jr. | Greenbrae, California | Reporter at KGO-TV |
| Rob Navias | Coral Gables, Florida | Correspondent with UPI, later NASA Public Affairs Office (PAO) Mission Commentator |
| Charles W. Petit | San Francisco, California | Reporter for the San Francisco Chronicle |
| Paul H. Recer | Houston, Texas | Correspondent with Associated Press |
| Peter Rinearson | Seattle, Washington | Reporter for The Seattle Times |
| Roger Rosenblatt | New York, New York | Senior writer at Time magazine |
| Alexander H. Rossiter Jr. | Columbia, Maryland | Science editor at UPI |
| Storer H. Rowley | Dallas, Texas | National correspondent for the Chicago Tribune |
| Anne K. (Kathy) Sawyer | Washington, D.C. | Reporter for the Washington Post |
| Barry D. Serafin | Fairfax, Virginia | National correspondent for ABC News |
| Lynn Sherr | New York, New York | National correspondent for ABC News |
| Katie Sherrod | Fort Worth, Texas | Columnist for the Fort Worth Star-Telegram |
| Jim Slade | McLean, Virginia | Correspondent for the Mutual Broadcasting System |
| Barbara M. Stanton | Detroit, Michigan | Reporter for the Detroit Free Press |
| Robert M. White II | Mexico, Missouri | Editor and publisher of The Mexico Ledger |
| John Noble Wilford | New York, New York | Science news reporter at The New York Times |
| James T. Wooten | Washington, D.C. | National correspondent for ABC News |

== Suspension ==
The steering committee expected that the workshop and selection of the five finalists would be conducted in October 1986, but on 1 July 1986, NASA asked the ASJMC to put the selection process on hold until such a time as another mission could be scheduled. This never happened. The Journalist in Space Project was never revived. In 1990, Japanese journalist Toyohiro Akiyama became the first journalist to fly in space, as a member of the Soyuz TM-11 mission. An announcement was to be made in February 2003 that Miles O'Brien had been chosen as the first journalist to fly to the International Space Station on the Space Shuttle, but this was cancelled after the Space Shuttle Columbia disaster.
