= Jeffrey A. Goldstein =

American treasury official and economist

Jeffrey Goldstein
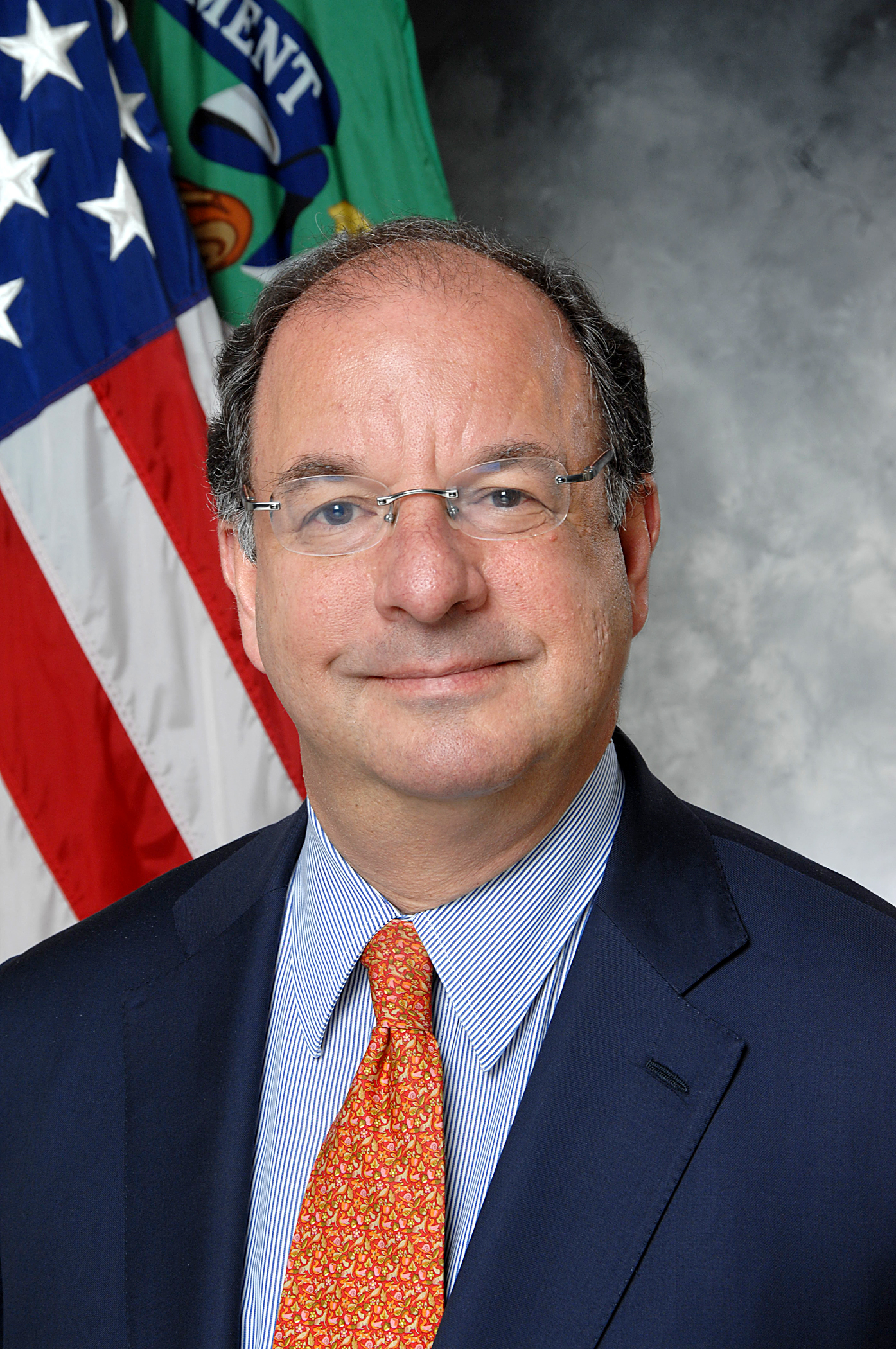

Under Secretary of the Treasury for Domestic Finance
- In office March 27, 2010 – August 2011
- President: Barack Obama
- Preceded by: Michael Barr (Acting)
- Succeeded by: Mary J. Miller

Personal details
- Born: Jeffrey Alan Goldstein; December 2, 1955 (age 70)
- Education: Vassar College (AB); Yale University (MA, MPhil, PhD)

Jeffrey A. Goldstein (born 1955) is a United States economist who was Under Secretary of the Treasury for Domestic Finance from March 27, 2010, to 2011. Jeffrey is currently the chairman of the board of directors of Fidelity National Information Services (FIS).

== Biography ==
Jeffrey A. Goldstein, was born on December 2, 1955. He was educated at Vassar College and the London School of Economics, receiving an A.B. in Economics from Vassar in 1977. He then attended graduate school at Yale University, earning an M.A., M.Phil., and a Ph.D. in Economics.

In 1982, Goldstein taught economics at Princeton University. He then worked at the Brookings Institution, focusing his research on international financial policy. Goldstein then joined Wolfensohn & Co., working there for fifteen years. When Wolfensohn & Co. was purchased by Bankers Trust in 1996, Goldstein stayed on as co-chairman of BT Wolfensohn and as a member of Bankers Trust's management committee.

In 1999, Goldstein became a managing director of the World Bank. He became chief financial officer of the World Bank in 2003, where he was a member of the Management Committee responsible for corporate leadership and strategy. Mr. Goldstein also oversaw the Bank's work with its client countries in strengthening financial and capital market systems. He helped lead the World Bank's relationship with the G-8 countries. He served as the Bank's representative on the Financial Stability Forum and on the IMF's Capital Markets Consultative Group and chaired the Bank's Pension Finance Committee. He joined Hellman & Friedman in 2004.

In July 2009, President Barack Obama nominated Goldstein to be Under Secretary of the Treasury for Domestic Finance and he held that office until 2011. In that role, he advised the Secretary on policy issues related to the US banking and financial systems, regulatory reform, financial stability, federal government financing, US housing finance, management of the US Government portfolio of investments in financial institutions and auto companies, fiscal affairs and related economic and financial matters. He was also the Chairman of the Deputies of the Financial Stability Oversight Council and served on the board of the Securities Investor Protection Corporation and was the Board Representative to the Pension Benefit Guaranty Corporation.

In July 2011, Secretary of the Treasury Timothy F. Geithner, awarded Goldstein with the Alexander Hamilton award, the highest honor for a presidential appointee.

Mr. Goldstein serves on the board of Bank of New York Mellon, where he is Chairman of the Finance Committee, and sits on the Executive, Compensation, and Risk committees. He also serves as chairman of the Board of Fidelity National Information Services (FIS), as well as on the boards of Westfield Corporation, Edelman Financial, Vassar College, and Grosvenor Capital Management. He was formerly a Director of LPL Financial, AlixPartners and Arch Capital. He also served on the boards of Save the Children, the International Center for Research on Women, the German Marshall Fund of the United States, the Brookings Institution Global Leadership Council and the London School of Economics North American Advisory Board. Mr. Goldstein was a member and past President of the Board of Trustees of Big Brothers/Big Sisters of New York City. Mr. Goldstein is also a member of the Council on Foreign Relations.

Government offices
Preceded by Michael Barr; Acting	Under Secretary of the Treasury for Domestic Finance; 2010–2011	Succeeded by Mary J. Miller
