= Brian C. Roseboro =

United States banker

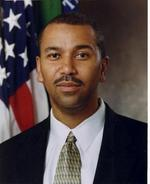
Brian C. Roseboro

Brian Carlton Roseboro is a United States banker who was Assistant Secretary of the Treasury for Financial Markets from 2001 to 2004 and Under Secretary of the Treasury for Domestic Finance from 2004 to 2005.

== Biography ==
Roseboro was educated at the University of Rochester, receiving a B.A. in Economics in 1981. He then attended Columbia Business School and received an M.B.A. in 1983.

From 1983 to 1988, Roseboro worked for the Federal Reserve Bank of New York, rising to become chief dealer on the foreign-exchange trading desk. In 1988, he joined First National Bank of Chicago as Vice President of foreign-exchange options trading. He worked there until 1993, when he became Director & Risk Management Advisor for Swiss Bank Corporation. From 1996 to 2001, he was deputy director of Market Risk Management for the American International Group.

In 2001, Roseboro became Assistant Secretary of the Treasury for Financial Markets. He held this post until 2004 when he became Under Secretary of the Treasury for Domestic Finance.

Upon leaving government service in 2005, Roseboro joined JPMorgan Chase in their Office of Government Affairs and later as Chief Risk Officer. He later joined UBS as Chief of Staff to the Americas COO.

Government offices
Preceded by Peter R. Fisher	Under Secretary of the Treasury for Domestic Finance; 2004–2005	Succeeded by Randal Quarles
