= Assistant Secretary of the Treasury for Financial Markets =

Official in the U.S. Treasury Department

- Flag of an Assistant Secretary of the Treasury
- Incumbent; Ethan Fallang (Acting) since April 28, 2026
- Department of the Treasury
- Style: The Honorable
- Reports to: Under Secretary of the Treasury for Domestic Finance
- Nominator: President of the United States
- Salary: $155,500 (2010)
- Website: Official website

The Assistant Secretary of the Treasury for Financial Markets is an official in the United States Department of the Treasury who heads the Office of Financial Markets.

According to U.S. statute, there are ten Assistant Secretaries of the Treasury appointed by the President of the United States with the advice and consent of the United States Senate. The Assistant Secretary of the Treasury for Financial Markets reports to the Under Secretary of the Treasury for Domestic Finance, who in turn reports to the United States Secretary of the Treasury and the United States Deputy Secretary of the Treasury.

== List of Assistant Secretaries of the Treasury for Financial Markets ==
Name	Assumed office	Left office	President appointed by	Secretary served under
Darcy E. Bradbury	1995	1997	Bill Clinton	
Gary Gensler	September 1997	April 1999	Bill Clinton	Robert Rubin
Lewis A. Sachs	1999	2001	Bill Clinton	Lawrence Summers
Brian C. Roseboro	2001	2004	George W. Bush	Paul O'Neill; John W. Snow
Timothy S. Bitsberger	2004	2005	George W. Bush	John W. Snow
Anthony Ryan	2006	2008	George W. Bush	Henry Paulson
Karthik Ramanathan (acting)	September 25, 2008	February 2010	George W. Bush; Barack Obama	Henry Paulson; Timothy Geithner
Mary J. Miller	February 2010	August 2012	Barack Obama	Timothy Geithner
Matthew S. Rutherford	August 2012	January 30, 2015	Barack Obama	Timothy Geithner; Jack Lew
Seth B. Carpenter (acting)	January 30, 2015	February 1, 2016	Barack Obama	
Daleep Singh (acting)	February 1, 2016	January 20, 2017	Barack Obama	
Monique Rollins (acting)	January 20, 2017	November 2017	Donald Trump	Steven Mnuchin
Brian Smith (acting)	January 20, 2021	May 10, 2022	Joe Biden	Janet Yellen
Joshua Frost	May 11, 2022	January 20, 2025	Joe Biden	Janet Yellen
Brian Smith (Acting)	January 20, 2025	July 29, 2025	Donald Trump	Scott Bessent
G. Hunter McMaster II (Acting)	July 29, 2025	April 28, 2026	Donald Trump	Scott Bessent
Ethan Fallang (Acting)	April 28, 2026	Present	Donald Trump	Scott Bessent

== See also ==
- Assistant Secretary of the Treasury
