= Juozas Kazickas =

Juozas Petras Kazickas or Joseph P. Kazickas (April 16, 1918 – July 9, 2014) was a Lithuanian-American businessman, self-made multi-millionaire and philanthropist. With assets estimated worth over 3 billion litas, he was considered to be the wealthiest Lithuanian in 2006.

== Early life ==
Kazickas' grandparents, due to their involvement in the Uprising of 1863, were deported to interior of Russia, where he was born in Chernaya Padina, Saratov Oblast. The family returned to Lithuania in 1922. Kazickas studied economics at Vytautas Magnus University (1937–1940) and Vilnius University (1941–1942). In Vilnius he worked at Vilnius municipality and was involved in resistance movements. In 1944, as Soviet Union was winning the war against Nazi Germany, he retreated to Germany, where he lived in displaced person camps and attended University of Tübingen. In 1947, he was admitted on a scholarship to post-graduate program at Yale University. In 1951, Kazickas defended his thesis about sovietization of Czechoslovakia and was awarded Ph.D. He turned down professorship at Georgetown University to establish Neris International, Inc. with fellow Lithuanian refugee Juozas Valiūnas. The Manhattan-based firm became a major exporter of coal to post-war Germany and Italy.

== Business career ==
Since 1980, Kazickas has been active in venture capital. He has consulted many international corporations, including Exxon, El Paso Natural Gas, Columbia Gas, Rockwell International, Philip Morris, Coca-Cola, Kawasaki Heavy Industries. He was a board member and trustee of many other enterprises, including Astrotech Corporation and Cosmos Bank. He also advised John J. McCloy during the Cuban Missile Crisis in 1962. Kazickas was involved in Lithuanian activities abroad and supported Lithuanian declaration of independence in 1990. He advised the Lithuanian governmental on economic affairs, transition to free market economy, and worked to establish commercial ties with the West. Kazickas brought Lawrence Summers to Lithuania to advise on the economic reforms. Using his wide network of business and political contacts, he helped to arrange meetings of Prime Minister Kazimiera Prunskienė with leaders of western nations and encouraged American companies (including Philip Morris, Coca-Cola, Motorola) to invest in Lithuania. In 1991, he established the first private capital communication company in Lithuania Litcom (now Telia). Kazickas was also involved in the sale of Mažeikių Nafta, a major oil refinery in Lithuania, to American Williams Companies. In 2002, Kazickas published a biography Vilties kelias (ISBN 998616236X), translated in English as Odyssey of Hope (ISBN 9986165059) in 2006.

== Philanthropy ==
In 1976, Kazickas' son Kęstutis was found dead in a hotel in Kathmandu, Nepal. In his memory, Kazickas sponsored construction of the Church of the Assumption, a Roman Catholic church in Kathmandu. In 1998, he established Kazickas Family Foundation, a private foundation. For year ended December 2008, it reported assets of US$11.5 million. The foundation donates to other foundations, grants scholarships, funds Baltic studies at Yale University and University of Washington, supports reconstruction of the Royal Palace of Lithuania and Pažaislis Monastery, and the sponsors Lithuanian cinema. For example, it supported retrospective of Lithuanian cinema at the Museum of Modern Art in New York (MoMA) and funded prizes at the Vilnius Documentary Film Festival.

== Awards ==
- Order of the Rifleman's Society (1973)
- Memorial Medal of January the 13th (1992)
- Order of the Lithuanian Grand Duke Gediminas (1995, 1998)
- Ellis Island Medal of Honor (USA) (1996)
- Order for Merits to Lithuania (2008)
