= Payden & Rygel =

American privately owned investment management firm

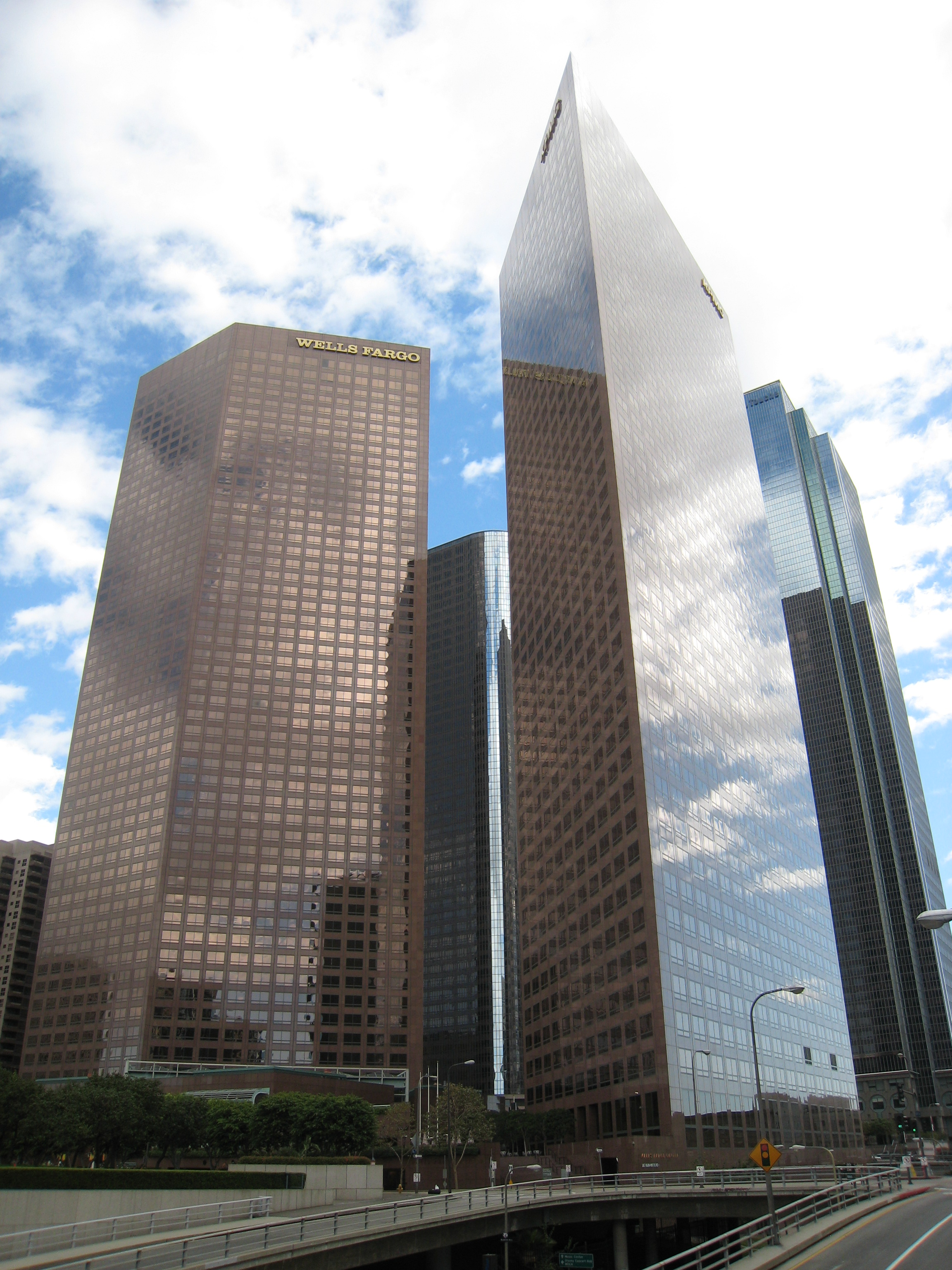
- Corporate Headquarters are in the Wells Fargo Center (left)
- Type: Private
- Industry: Investment Management
- Founded: 1983
- Founder: Joan Payden & Sandra Rygel
- Headquarters: Los Angeles, United States
- AUM: $166.6 Billion (2025)
- Number of employees: 239 (2024)
- Website: www.payden.com

Payden & Rygel is a privately owned investment management firm based in Los Angeles with $161.7 billion AUM, founded in 1983 by Joan Payden. The firm offers a range of mutual funds with debt and public equity based strategies, and also directly manages accounts for clients. The firm's economists and portfolio managers have also been quoted by financial news organizations, such as the Financial Times, The Wall Street Journal and Bloomberg Businessweek.

In March 2018, the firm announced the opening of an office in Milan, Payden & Rygel's first continental European office.
