= Southern Illinois University Press =

University press in Carbondale, Illinois, United States

- Parent company: Southern Illinois University
- Status: Active
- Founded: 1956
- Founder: Delyte Morris
- Country of origin: US
- Headquarters location: Carbondale, Illinois
- Distribution: Chicago Distribution Center (US); Scholarly Book Services (Canada); Eurospan Group (EMEA); East-West Export Books (Asia)
- Official website: www.siupress.com

Southern Illinois University Press or SIU Press, founded in 1956, is a university press located in Carbondale, Illinois, owned and operated by Southern Illinois University.

The press publishes approximately 50 titles annually, among its more than 1,200 titles currently in print.

Southern Illinois University Press is a member of the Association of University Presses.

== History ==
Southern Illinois University Press was founded by President Delyte Morris in the mid-1950s, and its first book—Charles E. Colby's A Pilot Study of Southern Illinois—was published on October 20, 1956. Publishing primarily in the humanities and social sciences, in a wide range of subject areas: art and architecture, classical studies, history (world and American), literary criticism, philosophy, religion, rhetoric and composition, speech communication, and theatre.

The Press has become especially well known for its publications in First Amendment Studies, Restoration and Eighteenth Century Theatre, and Rhetoric and Composition, and for two multi-volume scholarly works: The Early, Middle, and Later Works of John Dewey, and The Papers of Ulysses S. Grant. In addition, the Press has developed and maintained lists that celebrate and document the history and culture of southern Illinois, the state and the Midwest region.

In recent years, Southern Illinois University Press has focused its list on a smaller number of areas of publication: American history (Civil War and Lincoln), aviation, botany, film studies, legal history, poetry, regional studies, rhetoric and composition, and theatre.

== See also ==
- List of English-language book publishing companies
- List of university presses
